= COVID-19 pandemic in the Philippines =

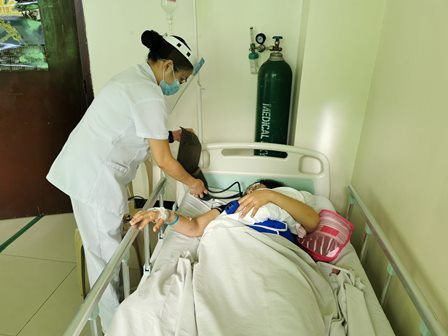
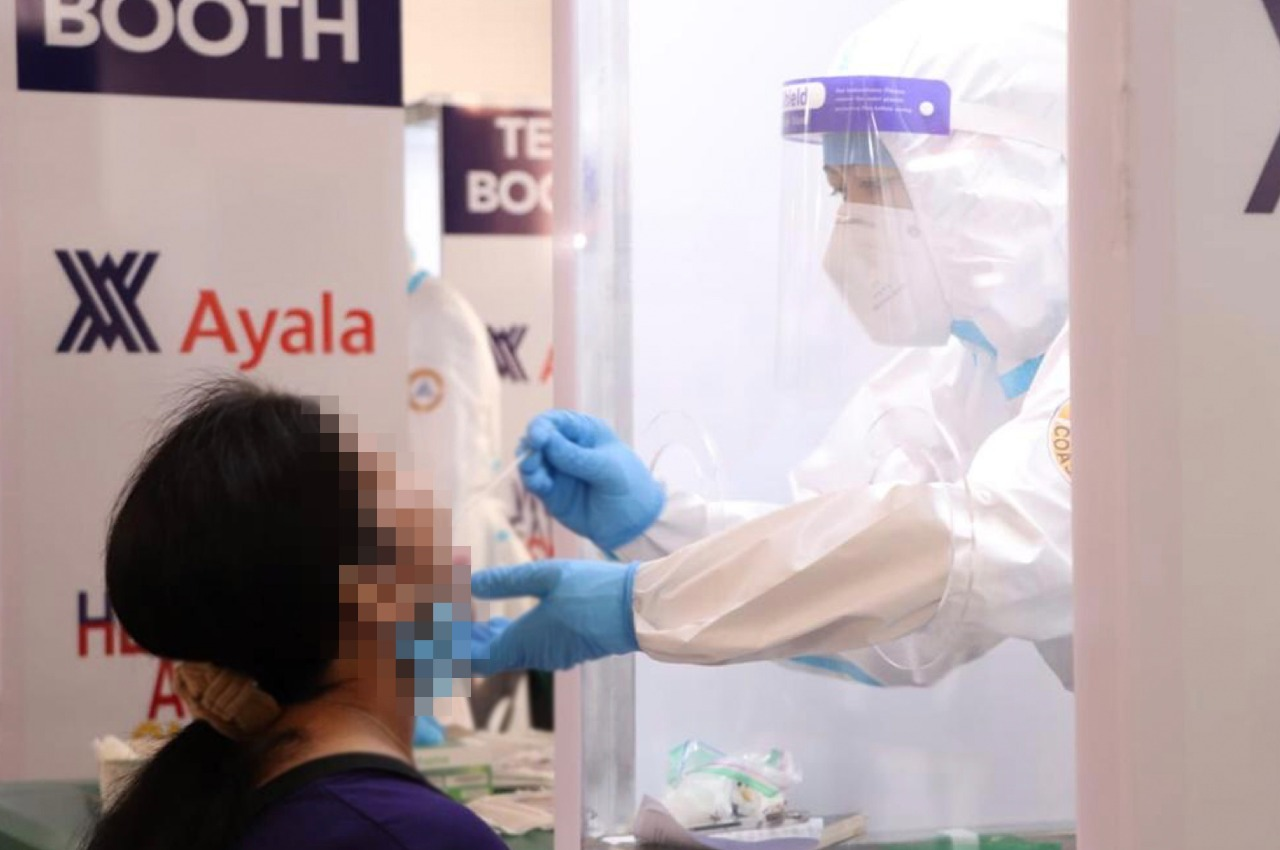
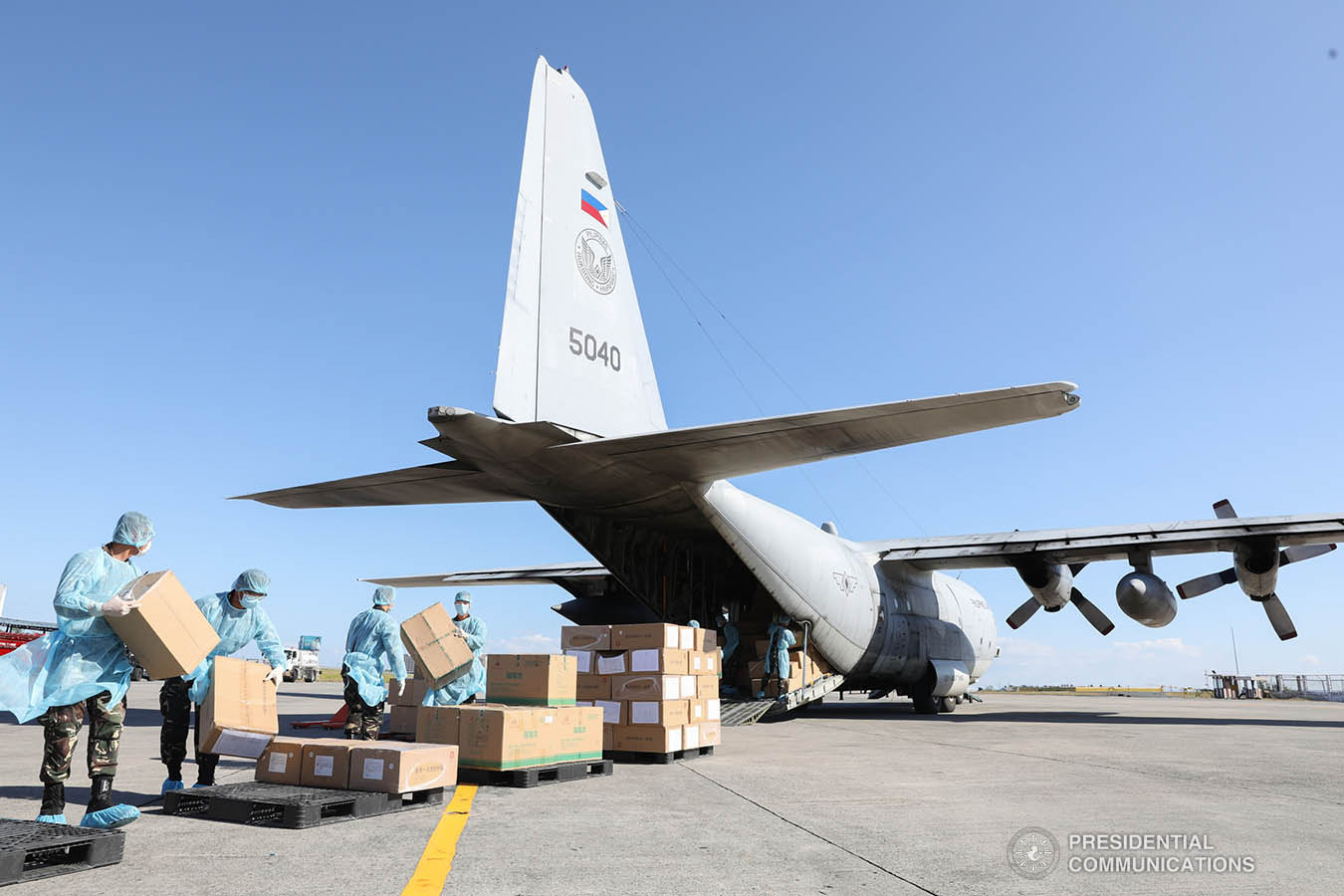
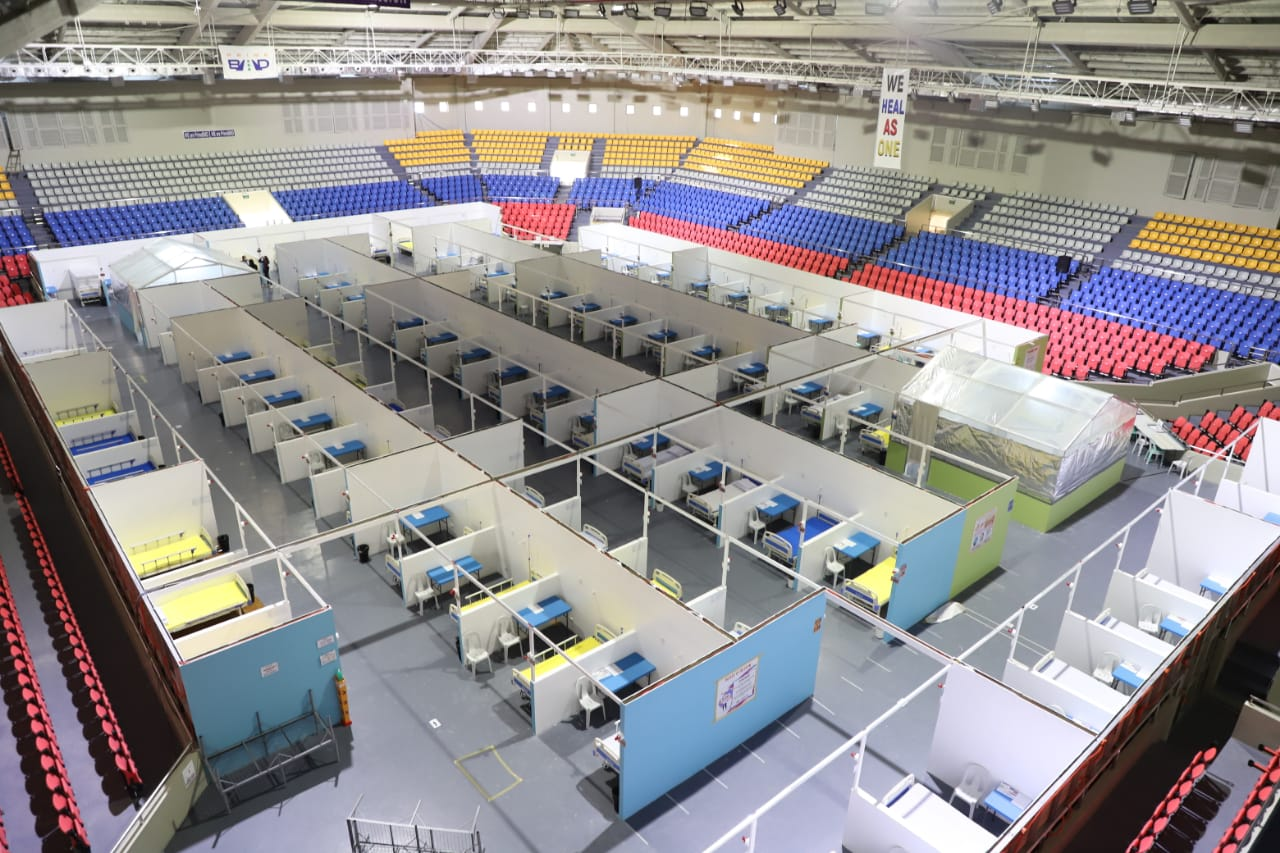
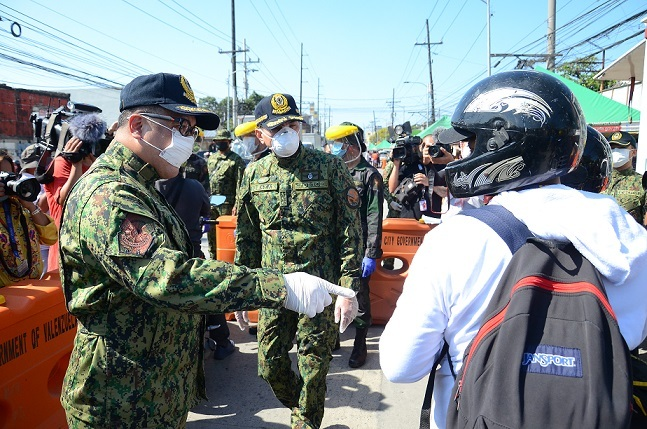
- Clockwise, starting from top: A medical worker attending to a patient in Manila; Unloading of aid packages donated by China at Villamor Air Base; Police checkpoint in Valenzuela, Metro Manila; Ninoy Aquino Stadium quarantine facility at Rizal Memorial Sports Complex; A person undergoing a swab test at Palacio de Maynila
- Disease: COVID-19
- Pathogen: SARS-CoV-2
- Location: Philippines
- First outbreak: Wuhan, Hubei, China
- Index case: Manila
- Date: First case of COVID-19: January 30, 2020 (Note: The patient arrived in the Philippines from Wuhan, China via Hong Kong on January 21 and sought consultation on January 25 after experiencing a mild cough.) (6 years, 7 months and 4 weeks) ago State of public health emergency: March 9, 2020 – July 22, 2023 (3 years, 4 months, 1 week and 6 days)
- Confirmed cases: 4,173,631
- Active cases: 7,037
- Severe cases: 24,474
- Critical cases: 12,118
- Recovered: 48,021,987
- Deaths: 66,864
- Fatality rate: 1.6%
- Vaccinations: 82,684,776 (total vaccinated); 78,443,970 (fully vaccinated); 189,317,150 (doses administered)

Government website
- www.covid19.gov.ph; doh.gov.ph/2019-nCoV

The COVID-19 pandemic in the Philippines was a part of the coronavirus disease 2019 (COVID-19) worldwide pandemic caused by severe acute respiratory syndrome coronavirus 2 (SARS-CoV-2). As of September 18, 2026, there have been 4,173,631 reported cases and 66,864 reported deaths, the fifth highest in Southeast Asia, behind Vietnam, Indonesia, Malaysia, and Thailand.

The first case in the Philippines was identified on January 30, 2020, involving a 38-year-old Chinese woman at San Lazaro Hospital in Metro Manila. On February 1, 2020, a posthumous test result from a 44-year-old Chinese man returned positive for the virus, making the Philippines the first country outside China to record a confirmed death from the disease.

After over a month without recording any cases, the Philippines confirmed its first local transmission on March 7, 2020. The virus subsequently spread to every province in the country. National and local governments imposed community quarantines after March 15, 2020, to limit the spread of the virus, including the Luzon-wide enhanced community quarantine (ECQ) from March to May 2020. (Note: The first imposition of the ECQ in Luzon encompassed the whole island group.) On March 24, President Rodrigo Duterte signed the Bayanihan to Heal as One Act, granting him additional powers to handle the pandemic. This was repealed by the Bayanihan to Recover as One Act, which he signed on September 11.

The Philippines had a slightly lower testing capacity than its Southeast Asian neighbors during the first months of the pandemic. By the end of January 2020, the Research Institute for Tropical Medicine (RITM) in Muntinlupa, Metro Manila became the country's first COVID-19 testing laboratory; before this, samples had to be sent to Australia for testing. The Philippines' Department of Health (DOH) has since accredited 279 laboratories as capable of detecting the SARS-CoV-2 virus. As of September 10, 2021, 277 of these laboratories conducted 19,742,325 tests from over 18,551,810 unique individuals.

In February 2022, COVID-19 cases throughout the country started to decline, and by May 2022 the DOH noted that the country was at "minimal-risk case classification," with an average of only 159 cases per day recorded from May 3 to 9. As of early June 2022, 69.4 million Filipinos had been fully vaccinated, while 14.3 million individuals received their booster shots. In August 2022, Filipino public schools reopened for in-person learning for the first time in two years. As of February 23, 2023, a total of 170,545,638 vaccine doses were administered. On July 22, 2023, President Bongbong Marcos lifted the COVID-19 pandemic as a state of public health emergency.

On June 14, 2024, a Reuters exposé revealed the United States had launched a clandestine campaign in the Philippines at the height of the pandemic to undermine China's inoculation, vaccine, face masks, and testing kits. Its purpose was to counter China's growing sphere of influence in the country under the Duterte administration. The Philippines' DOH expressed the need for further investigations into the matter. A subsequent Reuters report found that the Embassy of China in Manila hired a local marketing firm to conduct a covert astroturfing social media campaign which included promoting CoronaVac in the country.

== Timeline ==
=== January to February 2020 ===
The Philippines reported its first suspected COVID-19 case in January 2020; it involved a 5-year-old boy in Cebu who arrived in the country on January 12 with his mother. At that time, the Philippines could not conduct COVID-19 tests. The boy tested positive for "non-specific pancoronavirus assay" at the Research Institute for Tropical Medicine (RITM). Samples from the boy were also sent to the Victorian Infectious Disease Reference Laboratory in Melbourne, Australia, to determine the specific coronavirus strain. The boy's COVID-19 test came back negative, but by that time, several suspected cases had been reported in various parts of the country.

The RITM developed the capability to confirm COVID-19 cases in response to the emergence of suspected cases and began conducting confirmatory tests on January 30, 2020.

The first case of COVID-19 in the Philippines was confirmed on the same day. The diagnosed patient was a 38-year-old Chinese woman from Wuhan, who had arrived in Manila from Hong Kong on January 21. She was admitted to the San Lazaro Hospital in Manila on January 25 after seeking a consultation due to a mild cough. At the time of the confirmation announcement, the woman was already asymptomatic.

The second case was confirmed on February 2, a 44-year-old Chinese male who was the companion of the first case. He was coinfected with influenza and Streptococcus pneumoniae. His death on February 1 was the first due to COVID-19 recorded outside China.

On February 5, the Philippines Department of Health (DOH) confirmed a third case in a 60-year-old Chinese woman who flew into Cebu City from Hong Kong on January 20. She then traveled to Bohol, where she consulted a doctor at a private hospital on January 22 due to fever and rhinitis. Samples taken from the patient on January 24 returned negative, but the DOH was notified on February 3 that samples taken on January 23 tested positive for the virus. The patient recovered on January 31 and was allowed to return to China.

=== March 2020 ===
Number of cases (blue) and number of deaths (red) on a logarithmic scale

After a month of reporting no new cases, the DOH announced on March 6 that there were two cases involving two Filipinos. One was a 48-year-old man with a travel history in Japan that returned on February 25 and reported symptoms on March 3. The other was a 60-year-old man with a history of hypertension and diabetes who experienced symptoms on February 25 and was admitted to a hospital on March 1 when he experienced pneumonia. The DOH confirmed that the fifth case had no travel history outside the Philippines and was, therefore, the first case of local transmission. A sixth case was later confirmed in a 59-year-old woman who was married to the fifth case. Since then, the Department of Health recorded a continuous increase in the number of COVID-19 cases in the country.

Cases abroad involving foreigners with travel history in the Philippines were reported in early March 2020. The first three recorded cases involving an Australian, a Japanese, and a Taiwanese national had a history of visiting the Philippines in February 2020. Though it was unconfirmed whether or not they had contracted the virus while in the Philippines, speculations arose of undetected local transmissions in the country due to prior confirmation of the Philippines' first case of local transmission.

Retrospective studies have been conducted to determine the strain of the virus responsible for the community outbreak of COVID-19 in the Philippines since March 2020. In May 2020, Edsel Salvaña, director of the National Institute of Molecular Biology and Biotechnology and member of the Inter-Agency Task Force for the Management of Emerging Infectious Diseases (IATF-EID), said that the strain responsible for the COVID-19 outbreak in the country that started in March 2020 was closely related to the strain affecting India at the time. The virus strain's family tree was said by Salvaña to have first appeared in China and Australia.

Several measures were implemented to mitigate the spread of the disease in the country, including travel bans to mainland China, Hong Kong, Macau, and South Korea. On March 7, 2020, the Department of Health raised its "Code Red Sub-Level 1", with a recommendation to the President of the Philippines to impose a "public health emergency" authorizing the DOH to mobilize resources for the procurement of safety gear and the imposition of preventive quarantine measures. On March 9, President Rodrigo Duterte issued Proclamation No. 922, declaring the country under a state of public health emergency.

On March 12, President Duterte declared "Code Red Sub-Level 2", issuing a partial lockdown on Metro Manila for 30 days to prevent the nationwide spread of COVID-19. The lockdowns were expanded on March 16, placing the entirety of Luzon under an "enhanced community quarantine" (ECQ). Other local governments outside Luzon followed in implementing similar lockdowns. On March 17, President Duterte issued Proclamation No. 929, declaring the Philippines under a state of calamity for a tentative period of six months.

On March 20, four facilities, namely the Southern Philippines Medical Center in Davao City, Vicente Sotto Memorial Medical Center in Cebu City, Baguio General Hospital and Medical Center in Benguet, and the San Lazaro Hospital in Manila (where the first case was admitted), began conducting tests alongside the RITM. Other facilities began operations as well in the following days.

On March 25, the President signed the Bayanihan to Heal as One Act, which gave him additional powers to handle the outbreak.

=== April to May 2020 ===
Local government units were under enhanced community quarantine on April 8, 2020.

By April 6, COVID-19 was determined to have spread to all 17 regions of the Philippines with the confirmation of a patient confined at a hospital in Surigao City who had been in the Caraga region since March 12 after traveling from Manila.

On April 7, President Duterte accepted the recommendation of the Inter-Agency Task Force for the Management of Emerging Infectious Diseases to extend the ECQ in Luzon until April 30.

On April 17, Dr. Ted Herbosa, a special adviser of the National Task Force Against COVID-19, said that the country had been able to bring down the viral disease's reproduction number from 1.5 to 0.65, meaning that the average number of people a person could infect decreased from more than one to less than one. Recent data at the time suggested that the country was doing better in "flattening the curve", but Herbosa warned of a "resurgence" and said the Philippines must ramp up mass testing in order to isolate cases and avoid further transmission of COVID-19.

In late April, local government units (LGUs) were no longer authorized to impose quarantine measures without the IATF-EID's consent. Before that period, LGUs could impose such measures in coordination with the Department of the Interior and Local Government.

The ECQ in Luzon was extended until May 15 in some areas, including Metro Manila, Calabarzon, Central Luzon (except Aurora), Pangasinan, and Benguet. ECQ measures were also extended in the provinces of Iloilo and Cebu, as well as in Davao City. The rest of the country was placed under general community quarantine (GCQ).

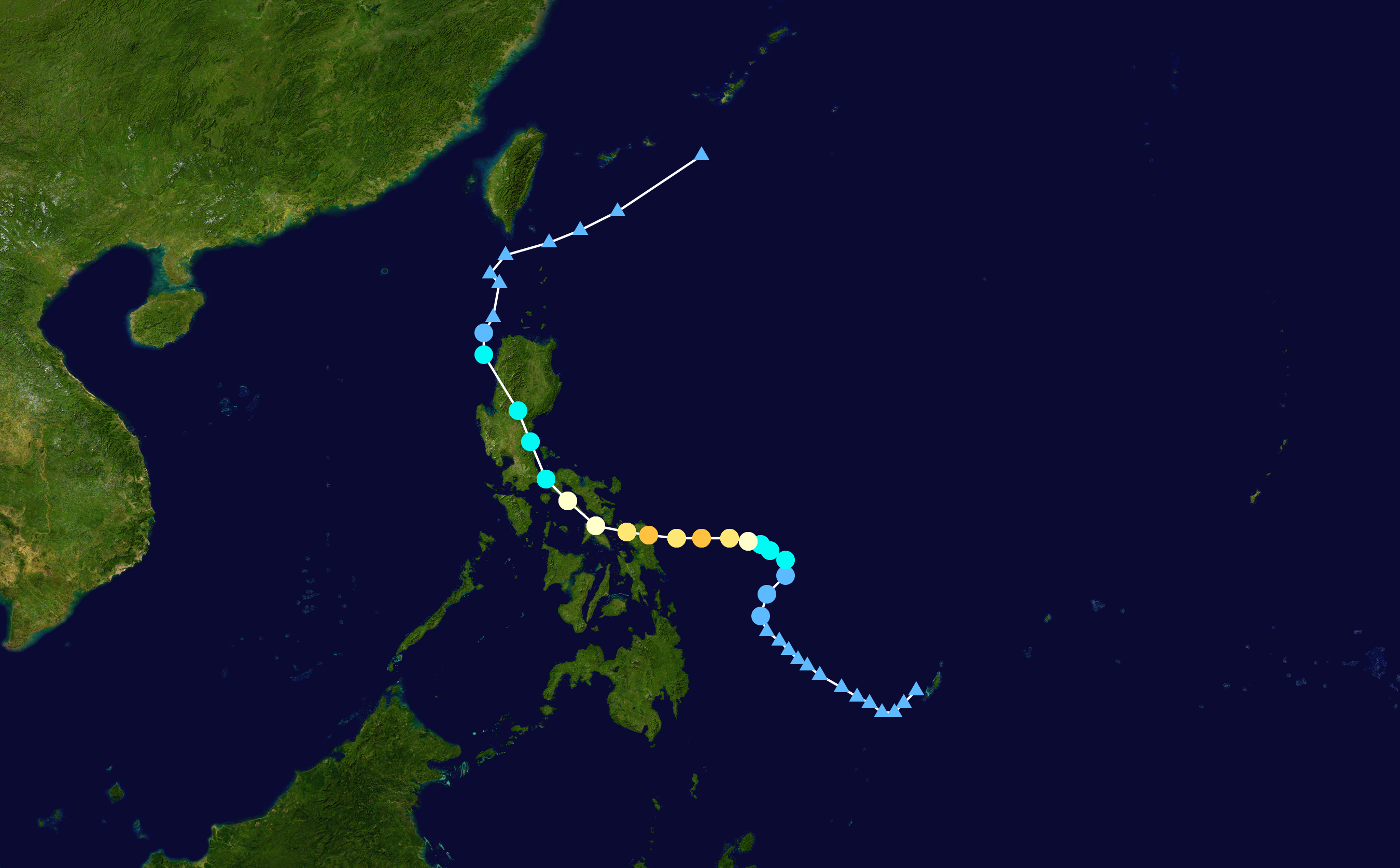
Path of Typhoon Vongfong (Ambo)

On May 14, Typhoon Vongfong (local name: Ambo) landed on Samar Island. Tens of thousands of people under lockdown orders evacuated their homes, complicating COVID-19 containment efforts. To prevent the spread of coronavirus, shelters in the central Philippines only accepted half of their maximum capacity; masks were required when evacuating. By the time the typhoon landed in the Philippines, the number of confirmed COVID-19 infections was 11,618, with 772 deaths. Vongfong also approached Manila, but due to severe restrictions on going out, most people, including low-income residents living in houses not designed to withstand typhoons, could not reach shelters and were forced to wait at home. In Metro Manila, the typhoon blew away many makeshift tents used as triage centers, testing facilities, and wards.

After May 15, the Philippine government revised its quarantine classifications to apply a modified enhanced community quarantine (MECQ) to Metro Manila, Laguna and Cebu City, while a GCQ was applied to 41 provinces and 10 cities with moderate risk. 40 provinces and 11 cities considered "low risk" were initially released from community quarantine measures, but were eventually upgraded to a "modified general community quarantine" (MGCQ) after requests from LGUs.

On May 14, the Philippine government declared the entire country temporarily under GCQ except for Metro Manila, Laguna and Cebu City, which continued to implement MECQ. The IATF-EID also reportedly considered the reclassification of provinces and cities in Central Luzon as "high-risk areas" under MECQ.

On May 16, after receiving petitions from LGUs, the IATF-EID revised its quarantine policies: Cebu City and Mandaue were placed under ECQ, while Metro Manila, Laguna, and Central Luzon (except Aurora and Tarlac) were under MECQ. The rest of the country was placed under GCQ.

=== June to July 2020 ===
Quarantine measures were loosened throughout the country starting on June 1, with areas formerly under ECQ transitioning to GCQ. This led to a significant rise in the number of confirmed cases.

The official start of elementary and secondary school classes, which customarily began in June, was postponed to October.

The Bayanihan to Heal as One Act expired in June. According to the national government, the law expired on June 25 due to its sunset provision, although some interpreted it as having expired as early as June 5. For example, Senator Sonny Angara argued that per the Constitution, "emergency powers cease upon the next adjournment of Congress" and that he considered the Bayanihan Act as an emergency measure. Upon the law's expiration, the national government was no longer required to provide cash subsidies to families affected by community quarantine measures.

In early June, the DOH created the COVID-19 Surveillance and Quick Action Unit to improve data collection and reconciliation. It launched its "Plan Recovery" program to address discrepancies between its counts of recovered patients and LGUs' counts. Mild and asymptomatic cases recorded starting July 15 were marked as recovered after 14 days from test swab collection, following the WHO's criteria for discharging COVID-19 patients. These changes led to over 37,100 cases being relabeled as recoveries on July 30.

=== August 2020 ===
On August 2, the Philippines surpassed the 100,000-case mark as the country continued to report around 2,000–3,000 new cases per day. On August 6, the country's cumulative total exceeded that of Indonesia, giving it the highest number of recorded COVID-19 cases in Southeast Asia, a position it held until October 15.

A modified enhanced community quarantine (MECQ) was established in Metro Manila, Bulacan, Cavite, Laguna, and Rizal from August 4 to 18 in response to the petition of medical front-line workers requesting an ECQ in Metro Manila.

In early August, the Philippine Senate held hearings on the Philippine Health Insurance Corporation (PhilHealth) corruption scandal; its executives were alleged to have used the pandemic as a cover-up to steal billions of pesos.

On August 13, the Philippine Genome Center (PGC) reported the new, globally dominant variant of the SARS-CoV-2 virus was detected in the Philippines. This more infectious variant was associated with the sudden increase of new cases in July.

By August 18, the DOH had identified 1,302 COVID-19 clusters throughout the country, with the majority in Metro Manila.

=== September to November 2020 ===
On September 11, President Duterte signed Republic Act No. 11494, or the Bayanihan to Recover as One Act, into law, providing additional funds to mitigate the pandemic's economic impact. He extended the state of calamity until September 2021 through Proclamation No. 1021, filed September 18.

The IATF-EID announced on September 18 that all cemeteries, columbariums, and memorial parks nationwide will be closed from October 29 to November 4 to prevent social gatherings traditionally conducted as part of the All Saints' Day observance, similar to the proposal made by Metro Manila mayors few days prior. Filipinos adapted their rituals by visiting cemeteries early or observing at home.

COVID-19 had spread to all provinces in the Philippines by September 28, when Batanes recorded its first case.

=== December 2020 ===
In mid-December, a new, more contagious variant of SARS-CoV-2 known as Lineage B.1.1.7 was identified in the United Kingdom. This led to several countries restricting or banning travel from the United Kingdom, including the Philippines. The Philippines also banned travel from 19 other nations which reported cases of more infectious SARS-CoV-2 variants.

The DOH announced at a briefing held in January 2021 that the UK variant arrived in the Philippines as early as December 2020. One of the samples collected by the health department on December 10 tested positive for the variant on January 21, 2021.

=== January to February 2021 ===
By January 2021, the DOH was monitoring at least two other noted mutations besides the UK variant, namely the 501.V2 variant from South Africa and another variant from Malaysia.

On January 5, 2021, Hong Kong health officials reported detecting the UK variant in a 30-year-old woman who arrived in the city from the Philippines on December 22, 2020, raising concerns that the strain may already be in the Philippines.

On January 13, the DOH announced that the UK variant has been detected in the country when a 29-year-old man from Quezon City, who returned from the United Arab Emirates on January 7, tested positive for COVID-19. Thirteen individuals who came in contact with the man also tested positive for the variant days later. On January 22, 16 new cases associated with the UK variant were confirmed in several regions, including Benguet, Laguna, and Mountain Province. A case each in Benguet and Laguna had no known contact with a confirmed case or a travel history outside the country.

The Food and Drug Administration (FDA) issued emergency use authorization to the Pfizer–BioNTech and Oxford–AstraZeneca COVID-19 vaccines on January 14 and 28 respectively.

On February 18, the DOH in Central Visayas announced that two SARS-CoV-2 "mutations under investigation", E484K and N501Y, were discovered in Cebu.

=== March to April 2021 ===
The DOH announced the detection of the South African variant of SARS-CoV-2 in Pasay on March 2.

On March 13, Lineage P.1, commonly known as the Brazilian variant, was detected in the country. The DOH also confirmed the mutations discovered in February formed a variant, which they called P.3, belonging to the B.1.1.28 lineage like P.1. The day prior, Japan reported the P.3 variant was found in a man who traveled from the Philippines. The WHO named the P.3 variant "Theta" on March 31, labelling it a "variant of concern".

On March 17, the Philippine Statistics Authority (PSA) reported that there were at least 27,967 deaths caused by or associated with COVID-19 by the end of 2020, more than twice the DOH's count. 19,758 of these were tagged "COVID-19 virus not identified", while 8,209 were tagged "COVID-19 virus identified". The discrepancy between the DOH and PSA tallies is due to the PSA's inclusion of probable and suspect cases.

As a response to the recent spike in cases, the Greater Manila Area, which the government called "NCR Plus", was placed under general community quarantine (GCQ) on March 22, originally set to expire on April 4. It was raised to an enhanced community quarantine (ECQ) from March 29 to April 11 as the positivity rate of the area remained high.

On April 26, the country surpassed 1 million cases.

=== May to June 2021 ===
On May 11, the country detected its first two cases of the Delta variant in two Filipino seafarers who returned in April.

In the summer of 2021, COVID-19 infections increased significantly in primarily rural regions. As of June 7, Mindanao accounted for a quarter of new cases, more than Metro Manila. Dozens of people in Dipolog were "treated for coronavirus outside in makeshift tents, or hooked up to oxygen tanks while sitting in their vehicles, due to the lack of hospital beds", according to an Al Jazeera article.

=== July 2021 ===
On July 16, presidential spokesman Harry Roque announced Indonesian travelers were forbidden from entering the country from July 16–31 to limit the spread of the Delta variant, which had become the dominant variant in several countries. The same day, the country detected 16 new Delta variant cases, 11 of which were locally transmitted. As a result, Metro Manila, Ilocos Norte, Ilocos Sur, Davao de Oro, and Davao del Norte were placed under general community quarantine with heightened restrictions starting July 23.

On July 29, the Department of Health (DOH) reported 97 new cases of the Delta variant, bringing the total to 216. Of the newly reported cases, 88 were local, 6 were returning overseas Filipinos, and 3 were unknown.

=== August 2021 ===
On July 30, the government placed Metro Manila under Enhanced Community Quarantine (ECQ), effective August 6 and ending August 20, due to rising cases of the Delta variant.

On August 5, the DOH detected 116 new Delta variant cases, bringing the total to 331. Of the additional cases, 95 were local, 1 was returning from overseas, and the remaining 20 had unknown provenance. The DOH also reduced the Delta variant case count reported on July 29 from 216 to 215, as one case was found to have been tested in two different laboratories.

On the same day, President Rodrigo Duterte, following the recommendation of the IATF, put the provinces of Laguna, Cagayan de Oro, and Iloilo City under ECQ from August 6 to 15; Lucena Cavite, Rizal, and Iloilo were put under modified enhanced community quarantine (MECQ), while Batangas and Quezon were under general community quarantine (GCQ) with heightened restrictions.

On August 15, the DOH detected the country's first case of the Lambda variant in a 35-year-old female. The DOH said the patient was asymptomatic and marked as recovered after undergoing the 10-day isolation period. The DOH also detected 182 new cases of the Delta variant, as well as 41 of the Alpha variant, 66 of the Beta variant, and 40 of the Theta variant.

On August 19, Metro Manila and the province of Laguna were placed under MECQ from August 21 to 31.

The World Health Organization released a statement on August 28 that the Delta variant had become the dominant variant of SARS-CoV-2 in the Philippines, with community transmission occurring (meaning infected individuals were no longer in direct contact).

=== September 2021 ===
On September 1, the number of COVID-19 cases in the country surpassed 2 million.

On September 3, the Philippines Food and Drug Administration (FDA) approved the emergency use of Moderna's COVID-19 vaccine for minors aged 12 to 17.

The government introduced a new 5-tier Alert Level System (ALS) to replace the ECQ, MECQ, GCQ, and MGCQ labels, with a pilot implementation in Metro Manila beginning on September 16.

=== October 2021 ===
On October 15, the government began the vaccination of minors with comorbidities against COVID-19.

The coverage of the ALS was expanded to include LGUs in the Calabarzon, Central Visayas, and Davao regions on October 20.

On October 25, the DOH confirmed the first case of the B.1.1.318 variant in the country. The DOH also detected 380 more cases of the Delta variant, as well as 104 Alpha variant cases and 166 Beta variant cases.

=== November 2021 ===
On November 8, the country detected its first case of the B.1.617.1 variant, formerly called the Kappa variant, in a 32-year-old male from Floridablanca.

The Alert Level System was rolled out nationwide on November 22.

=== December 2021 ===
The Omicron variant was first detected in the Philippines on December 15. The cases involved two travelers from Nigeria and Japan who arrived in the Philippines on November 30 and December 1, respectively. By December 28, there were four Omicron cases confirmed, all international travelers.

=== January 2022 ===
On January 15, the DOH confirmed community transmission of the Omicron variant in Metro Manila, which caused a spike in cases that began in late December 2021 and continued through the first half of January 2022. A shortage of analgesics like paracetamol and other drugs for flu-like symptoms was reported. The DOH assured the public there is no shortage, though the Department of Trade and Industry (DTI) noted some brands were unavailable in certain areas due to logistical issues.

=== October 2022 ===
The first confirmed cases of the Omicron XBB subvariant and XBC variant were detected in the Philippines on October 17.

== Medical response ==
=== Hospital admission policy ===
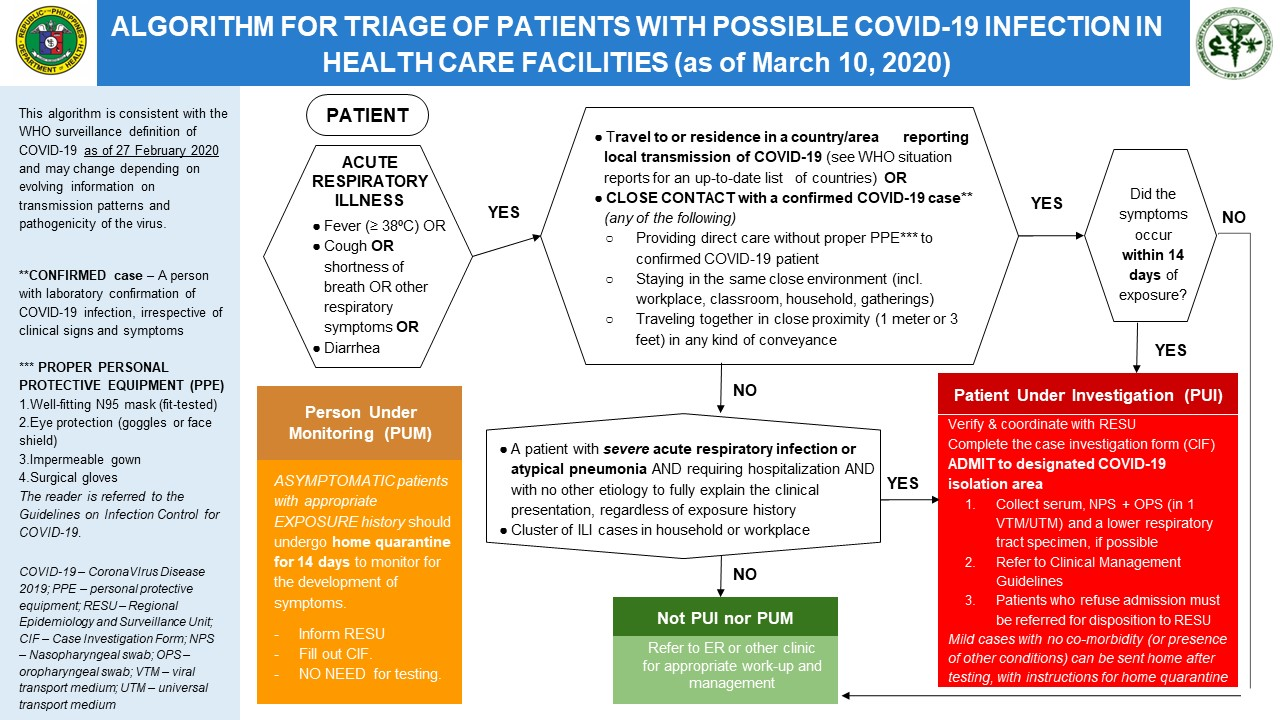
Algorithm for the triage of patients with possible COVID-19 infection in health care facilities (as of March 10, 2020)

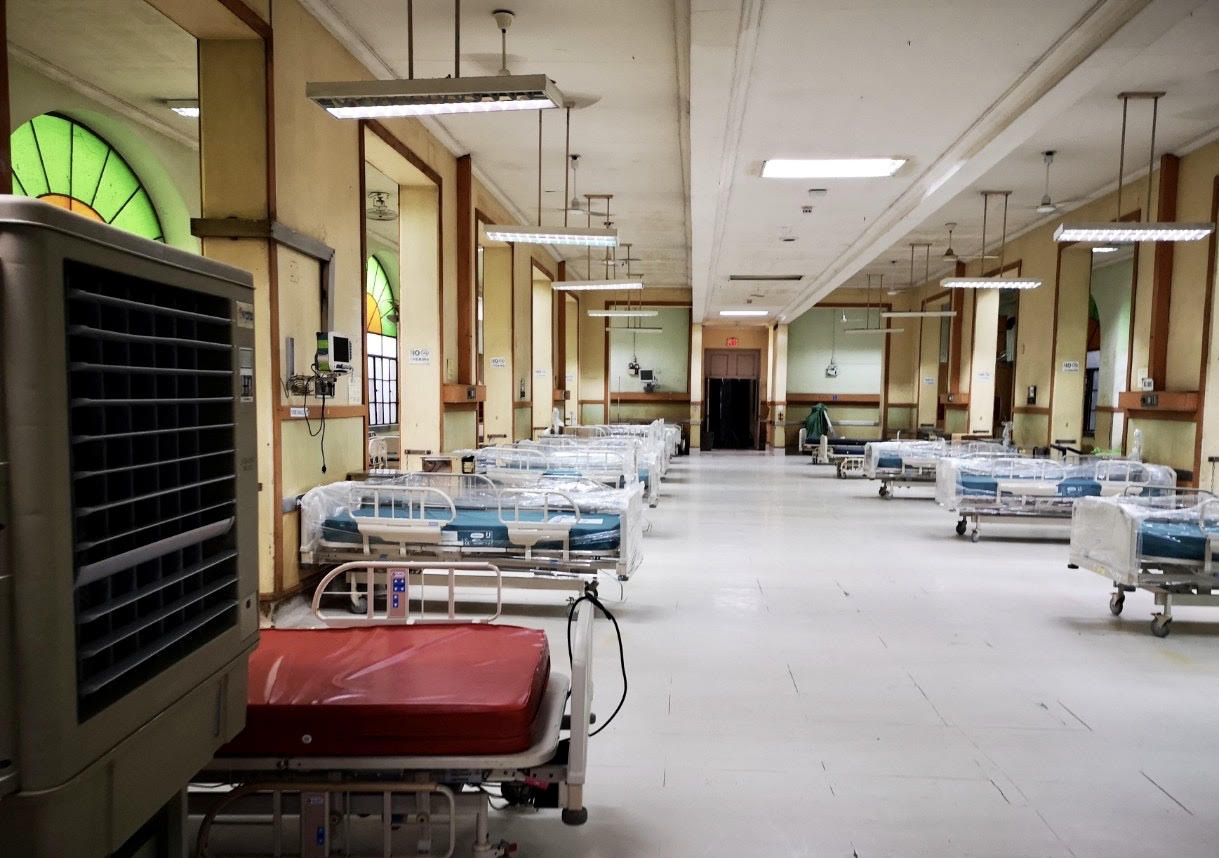
A ward dedicated for COVID-19 patients at the Philippine General Hospital

As of April 2020, the Philippines Department of Health (DOH) designated 75 COVID-19 referral hospitals where patients in severe or critical condition were to be referred, with an overall capacity of 3,194 patients. This was an increase from the three hospitals initially designated in March 2020.

Level 2 and 3 hospitals were required to admit people suspected or confirmed to have COVID-19; refusal of admission was said by the DOH to be a "violation of the signed Performance Commitment and shall be dealt with by the PhilHealth accordingly".

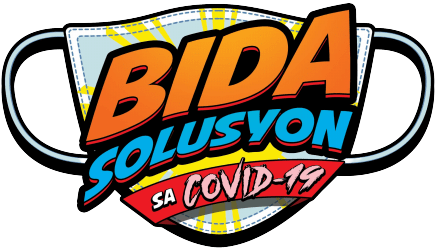
Logo of BIDA Solusyon sa COVID-19, (Note: "Be the Solution to COVID-19". BIDA is an acronym for "bawal walang mask" ("no wearing of face mask is prohibited"), "i-sanitize ang mga kamay" ("sanitize hands"), "dumistansya ng isang metro" ("observe distancing of one meter"), and "alamin ang tamang impormasyon" ("be correctly informed").) the DOH's official campaign against COVID-19

On March 16, 2020, the DOH announced a revision to its protocol on hospital admission for COVID-19-positive patients. A week prior, the DOH began sending both asymptomatic patients and individuals with mild symptoms back home for quarantine and ongoing health monitoring until they were deemed recovered. Priority was given to high-risk patients or those with severe symptoms for hospital admission.

In mid-2021, the city of Makati initiated a program to treat mild cases at home and reduce pressure on hospitals.

=== Drug therapy and vaccine development ===
==== Vaccine trial participation ====
The Philippines, with at least 45 other countries, joined the World Health Organization (WHO)'s Solidarity trial to study the effectiveness of certain untested drugs in treating COVID-19. Dr. Marissa Alejandra of the Philippine Society of Microbiology and Infectious Disease was the Philippines' representative in the study, with Health Undersecretary Maria Rosario Vergeire as the official liaison of the DOH.

In April 2020, the Department of Science and Technology (DOST) announced it is seeking bilateral collaboration with other countries such as China, Russia, South Korea, Taiwan, and the United Kingdom on endeavors related to the vaccine development for COVID-19. In April 2020, President Rodrigo Duterte declared a ₱10 million bounty to any Filipino who could produce a vaccine against COVID-19, which he later increased to ₱50 million (around $1 million).

==== Research on other treatments ====
The DOST, Philippine General Hospital, and the Ateneo de Manila University collaborated with the Duke–NUS Medical School in Singapore to evaluate the feasibility of lauric acid from virgin coconut oil, Vitex negundo (known locally as Lagonda), and Euphorbia hirta (known locally as tawa-tawa) as a "functional food" or "dietary regimen supplement" to help patients combat COVID-19, similar to how tawa-tawa is used as a dietary remedy against dengue.

=== Vaccination ===
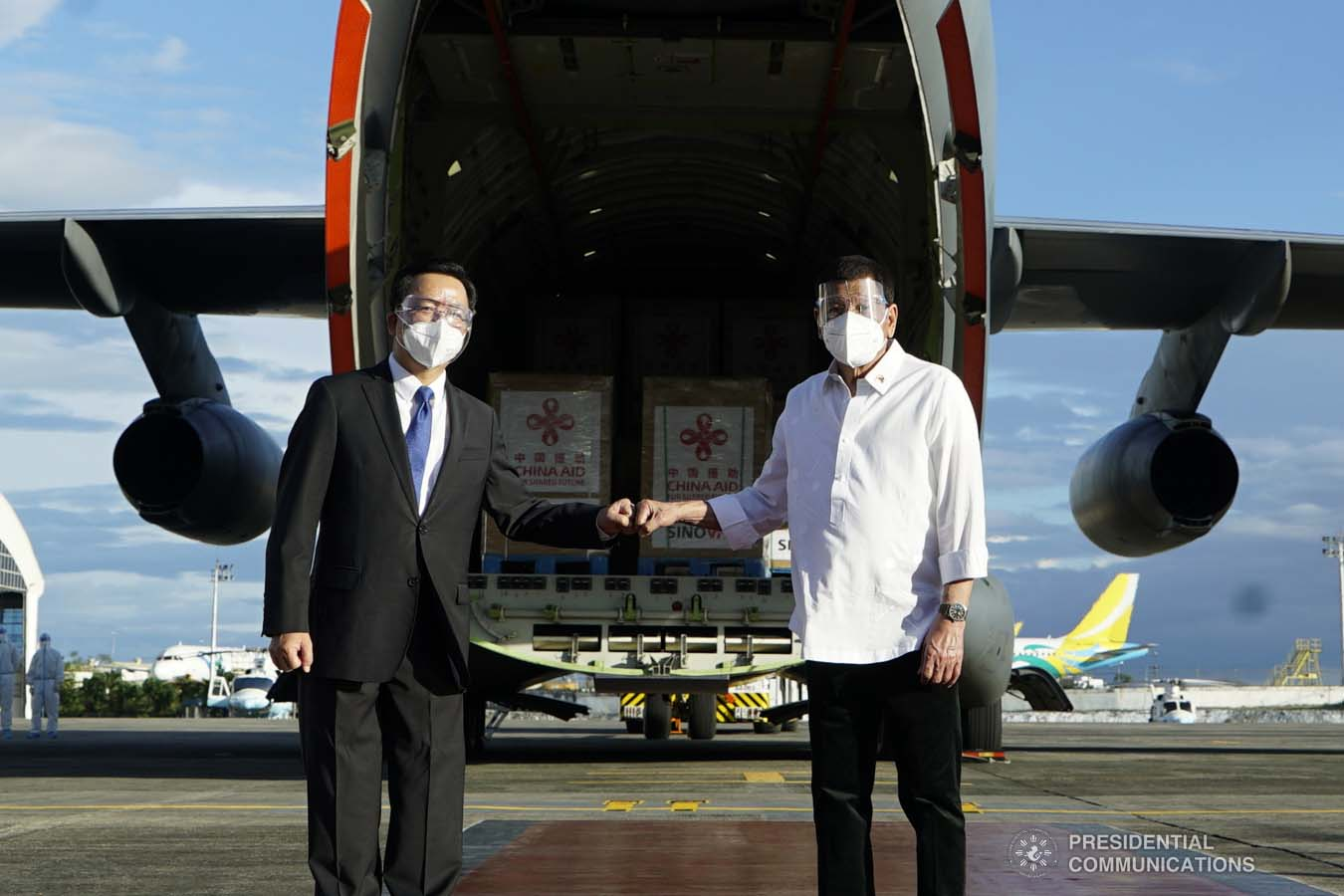
President Rodrigo Duterte (right) with Chinese Ambassador to the Philippines Huang Xilian during the ceremonial turnover of COVID-19 vaccine CoronaVac at Villamor Air Base in Pasay City on February 28, 2021

==== Supply ====
The Philippine government negotiated with various foreign manufacturers to secure the country's COVID-19 vaccine supply, including Sinovac Biotech (China), Gamaleya Research Institute (Russia), Moderna (United States), and Pfizer (United States).

At the end of 2020, the private sector, with government sanction, secured at least 2.6 million vaccine doses from British-Swedish manufacturer AstraZeneca. In January 2021, the Philippine government secured 25 million vaccines from Sinovac and 30 million doses from the Serum Institute of India in partnership with the American firm Novavax. They also signed a tripartite agreement with AstraZeneca and the private sector to receive 20 million vaccine doses. Officials on the National Task Force (NTF) Against COVID-19 projected it would have at least 164 million doses from various manufacturers in 2021.

The national government's procurement efforts have been the subject of various controversies. Health Secretary Francisco Duque failed to secure a Pfizer vaccine deal that could have delivered 10 million doses as early as January 2021. Plans to secure 26 million doses from China's Sinovac were also scrutinized by Congress due to its reported efficacy rate of 50 percent in Brazilian late-stage trials. The Department of Health said that Sinovac's vaccine satisfied the World Health Organization minimum standards, while the FDA pointed out that Sinovac was yet to publish an official report on its vaccines' effectiveness and that reported results for the vaccine varied by country; for example, the efficacy was over 90 percent in Turkish trials.

==== Authorization and usage ====
On December 2, 2020, President Rodrigo Duterte signed an executive order allowing the Food and Drug Administration to grant emergency-use authorization (EUA) to COVID-19 vaccines and treatments. Under certain conditions, vaccines and drugs could be approved within a month, instead of undergoing the usual six-month review process. Among the conditions is for a vaccine manufacturer to obtain prior EUA in its country of origin or other countries with a "mature" regulator. The FDA announced that three vaccine manufactures – namely Pfizer, AstraZeneca, and Sinovac – had inquired on the process of obtaining an EUA in the Philippines. On December 23, Pfizer applied for an EUA for its vaccine.

Duterte said in December 2020 that some members of the military already received COVID-19 vaccines from the Chinese manufacturer Sinopharm despite the vaccine not yet being officially approved by the country's health authorities. A few days later, it was reported that some members of the Presidential Security Group had also received vaccine from an unknown manufacturer.

=== Testing ===
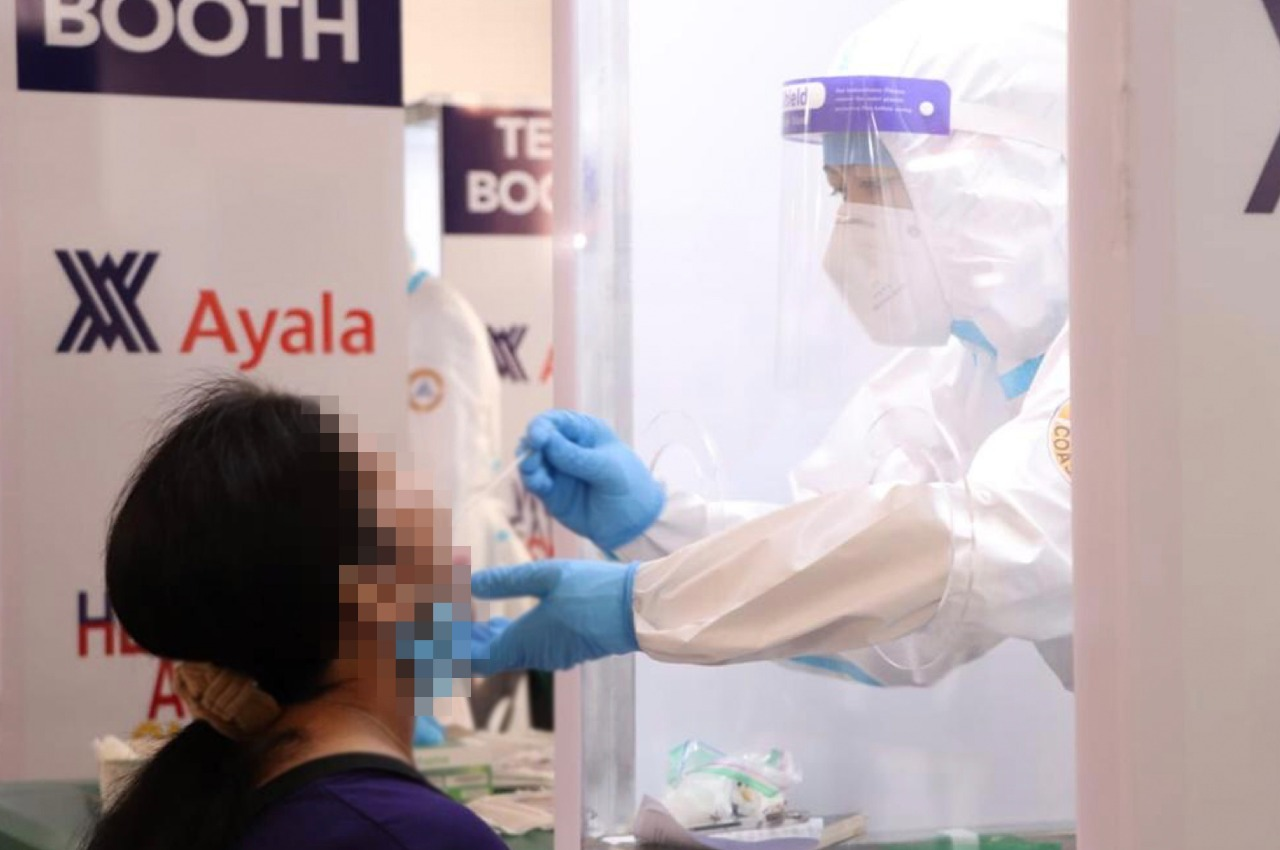
A medical worker takes a swab sample from a woman for COVID-19 testing at the Palacio de Maynila.

Early COVID-19 testing in the Philippines was limited to persons with a history of travel to countries with cases of local transmission and those with exposure to individuals confirmed to have COVID-19. The testing protocols were revised sometime in mid-March 2020 to prioritize testing of any individual with severe symptoms alongside elderly, pregnant, and immunocompromised persons with at least mild symptoms. On March 30, symptomatic healthcare workers were also considered priority for testing.

During his press briefing on May 19, presidential spokesperson Harry Roque said that the government's "expanded targeted testing" would target the following: "(1) all symptomatic cases, (2) all of those coming from abroad, (3) all close contacts of confirmed cases that were found through contact tracing, and (4) all of those who tested positive on rapid antibody tests." Roque also said the government would begin testing through "benchmarks", testing 1–2% of the Philippines' entire population and up to 10–12% of the worst affected regions, such as Metro Manila.

On January 24, 2021, after receiving the go-ahead from the national government, the Philippine Red Cross announced they would start conducting COVID-19 tests using saliva samples on January 25.

==== Testing controversy ====
In late March 2020, some politicians and their relatives were reportedly tested for COVID-19 despite not showing any symptoms, causing public backlash amidst a shortage of testing kits. At the time, it was against DOH guidelines to test asymptomatic individuals. The DOH responded by clarifying that, while there is "no policy for VIP treatment" concerning testing for COVID-19 and that "all specimens are being processed on a first-in, first-out basis", it "extends courtesy" to front line government officials, specifically those involved in national security and public health. Some senators who were tested claimed they used rapid antibody tests not accredited by the DOH at that time.

==== Capacity ====
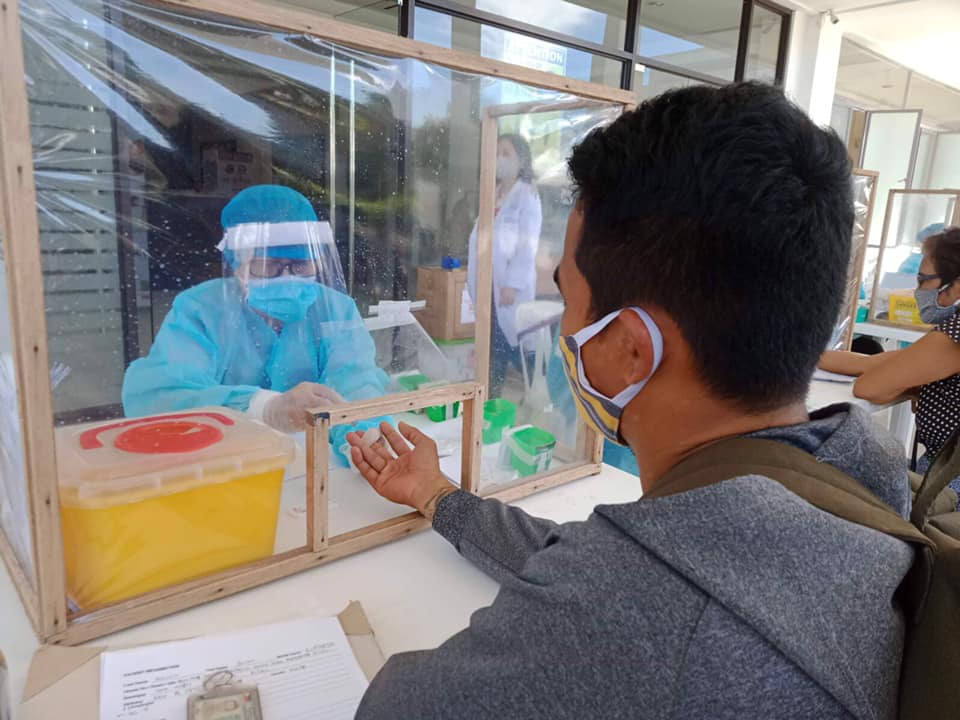
COVID-19 testing in Rodriguez, Rizal

In July 2020, there were 85 testing laboratories nationwide conducting 25,000 tests daily. The country conducted over 3 million tests by September 2020.

By March 9, 2020, a total of 2,000 tests had been conducted at a rate of 200 to 250 people per day. The testing capacity of the Philippine government was expanded by late March 2020; as of March 23, the Research Institute for Tropical Medicine (RITM) in Muntinlupa alone could test 600 people per day, with other laboratories able to do 100 daily tests. Due to its backlog, by March 27 it took 5–7 days to receive testing results from the RITM, though the institute said it was committed to reducing the turnaround to 2–3 days.

Due to the increased number and capacity of the country's accredited laboratories and the procurement of additional testing kits, starting in April 2020, the Philippines was able to conduct mass testing, either through reverse transcription polymerase chain reaction (RT-PCR) or rapid antibody testing. The first localized targeted mass testing began in Valenzuela, Metro Manila on April 11.

On April 14, 2020, the DOH announced it would conduct targeted mass testing nationwide for susceptible, probable, and high-risk patients, including health workers, expectant mothers, and those with other medical conditions. RITM temporarily scaled down its operations from April 20–24 after 43 of its staff tested positive for COVID-19.

The Inter-Agency Task Force for the Management of Emerging Infectious Diseases (IATF-EID) adopted a resolution commencing a "national government-enabled, local government unit-led, and people-centered response" to COVID-19. Other local government units followed suit shortly afterward.

==== Testing kits ====
The Food and Drug Administration approved the usage of 75 PCR test kits (including one locally developed kit), 79 rapid antibody testing kits, 53 immunoassay testing kits, and 7 other testing kits as of July 30, 2020.

A PCR testing kit was locally developed by the National Institutes of Health at the University of the Philippines Manila which was reportedly six times cheaper than its foreign counterparts. It was first approved for commercial use in April 2020 by the Food and Drug Administration (FDA), but was recalled in May by its manufacturer after it was found out that 30 percent of the kits yielded indeterminate results. After its defects were fixed, the testing kit was re-approved and made commercially available in July.

==== Facilities ====
Before January 30, 2020, there were no medical facilities in the country that could confirm cases of COVID-19. The RITM conducted preliminary tests on suspected cases to determine if they are infected with a coronavirus, but could not detect whether they had the new strain; samples had to be sent to the Victorian Infectious Diseases Reference Laboratory in Melbourne, Australia, for confirmatory testing for SARS-CoV-2 specifically.

The National Task Force for COVID-19 created Task Force T3 (Test, Trace, and Treat) in April 2020 to establish public-private partnerships to conduct mass testing. The task force cited the San Miguel Corporation as a pioneer in the move to open its COVID-19 testing laboratory to test all of its 70,000 employees initially. As of August 24, the country had 110 subnational laboratories capable of detecting SARS-CoV-2.

==== Backlogs ====
View source data.

From May 29 to June 17, 2020, the DOH included testing backlogs in its daily case bulletin. These backlogs, referred to as "late cases", were validated by the DOH's Epidemiology Bureau at least four days after the release of test results. Late cases were reported alongside new or "fresh" cases, which were validated within three days of the test results being released. The health department implemented this change to clarify the sudden increase in cases in the country.

The then-largest single-day increase in the number of confirmed cases in the country was attributed to the backlog in late June 2020, when 2,434 new cases were announced, 1,287 of which were late cases. It surpassed the backlog that existed in late May 2020, when 1,000 out of 1,046 cases were reported to be late cases.

== Government response ==
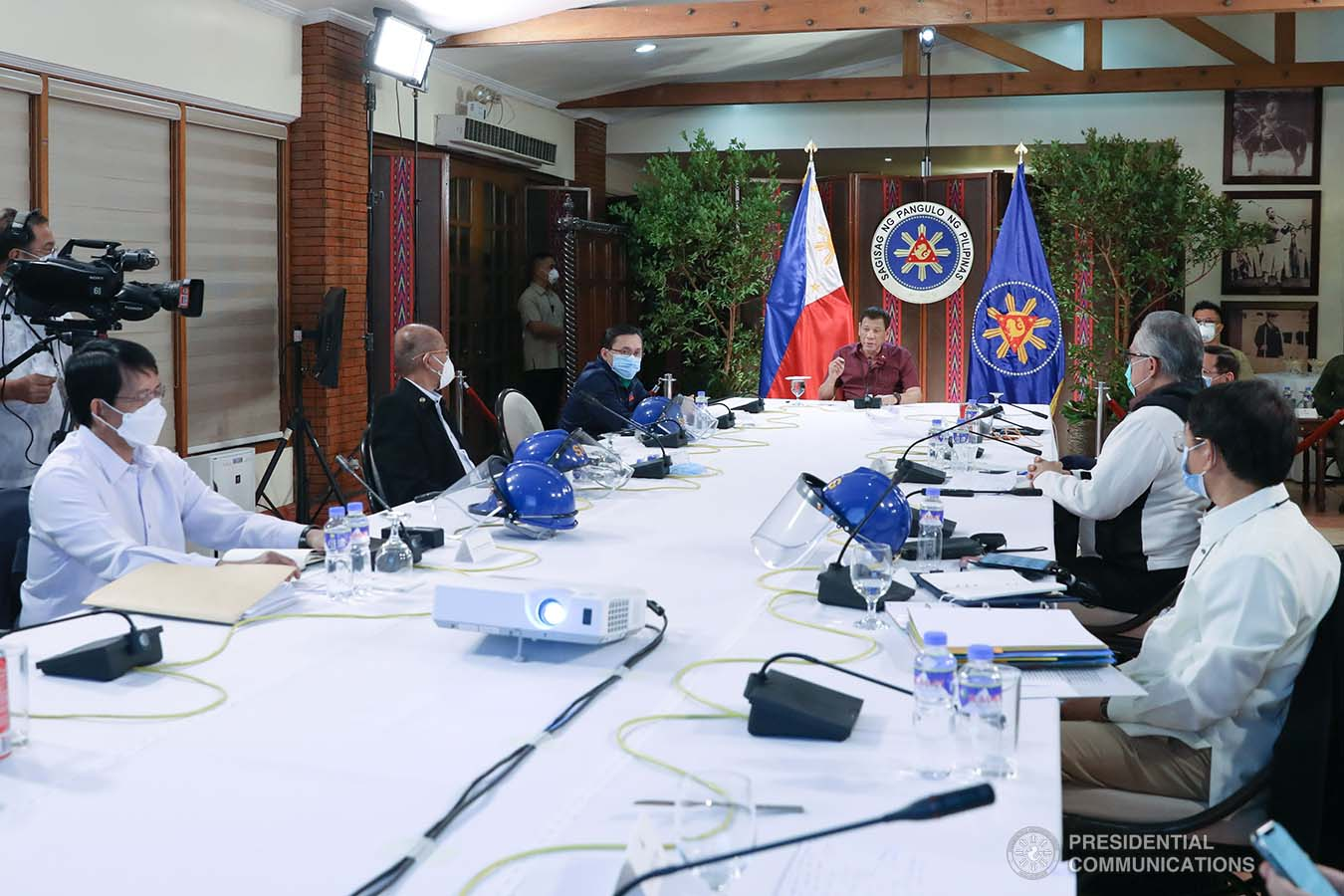
President Rodrigo Duterte meets with the members of the Inter-Agency Task Force for the Management of Emerging Infectious Diseases (IATF-EID).

=== Nationwide measures ===
The national government declared a state of calamity across the Philippines on March 16, 2020, via Proclamation No. 929 signed by President Rodrigo Duterte. The declaration brought into effect for six months the following:

- price control of basic needs and commodities,
- granting interest-free loans,
- distribution of calamity funds,
- authorization of importation and receipt of donations, and
- hazard allowance for public health workers and government personnel in the fields of science and technology.

==== Legislative response ====
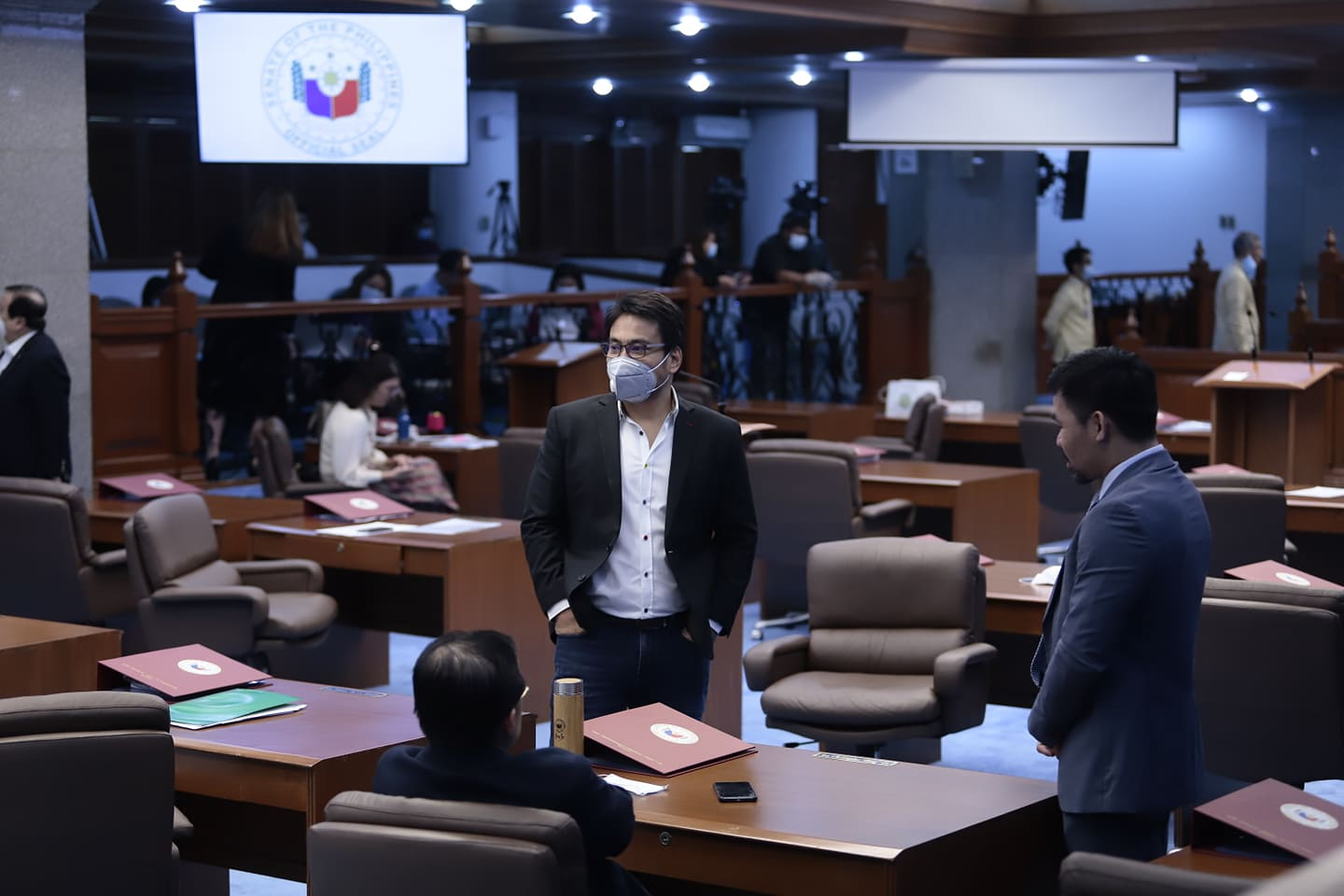
Senators during a special session to tackle the passage of the Bayanihan to Heal as One Act, March 23, 2020

Following the sharp increase of confirmed cases, President Duterte called on Congress to hold special sessions on March 23 to enact the Bayanihan to Heal as One Act, which would authorize Duterte to "reallocate, realign, and reprogram" a budget of almost ₱275 billion ($5.37 billion) from the estimated ₱438 billion ($8.55 billion) national budget approved for 2020 in response to the pandemic.

In the House of Representatives, the bill was introduced as House Bill No. 6616 with House Speaker Alan Peter Cayetano of Pateros–Taguig as its principal sponsor and was defended on the floor by Deputy Speaker Luis Raymund Villafuerte of Camarines Sur's 2nd district. In the Senate of the Philippines, the bill was introduced as Senate Bill No. 1418 with Senate President Tito Sotto and Senator Pia Cayetano as its principal sponsors.

The House version of the bill passed in a 284–9 vote without abstentions, while its Senate version was unanimously passed. President Duterte signed the bill into law on March 25. The law was effective for three months until June 25, owing to its sunset provision.

A piece of legislation was proposed to replace the Bayanihan Act, dubbed the Bayanihan to Recover as One Act (Bayanihan 2). On August 20, 2020, the bicameral committee approved a reconciled version of the bill. It was signed into law by Duterte on September 11.

In November 2020, the Senate introduced Senate Bill No. 1909, with the official title "An Act Extending the Availability of Selected Appropriations in the General Appropriations Act of 2020 and the Bayanihan to Recover as One Act under Republic Act Nos. 11465 and 11494, respectively." The bill, authored by Senator Ralph G. Recto, proposed to extend the period during which appropriations and allotments originally intended for the GAA 2020 and RA 11494 COVID-19 response programs would remain valid. The primary aim was to ensure that the funds set aside for health interventions, social amelioration, employment initiatives, and economic recovery projects remained usable even after their expiration date of 31 December 2020. The measure extended the availability of these funds until 27 March 2021, the adjournment of the Eighteenth Congress, and required the Department of Budget and Management to issue revised allotment documents reflecting the extension.

Republic Act No. 11525, the COVID-19 Vaccination Program Act of 2021, established the national legal framework for the Philippines' vaccination rollout. The Act authorized the Department of Health (DOH) and the National Task Force Against COVID-19 to procure vaccines and related supplies through negotiated emergency procurement, while allowing local government units and private entities to participate through multi-party agreements. It created the COVID-19 National Vaccine Indemnity Fund, managed by PhilHealth, to compensate individuals who experienced serious adverse reactions following immunization. The law also exempted vaccine procurement, importation, storage, transport, and administration from customs duties, VAT, excise tax, and donor's tax, provided the vaccines were not sold and were distributed free of charge.

=== Lockdowns ===
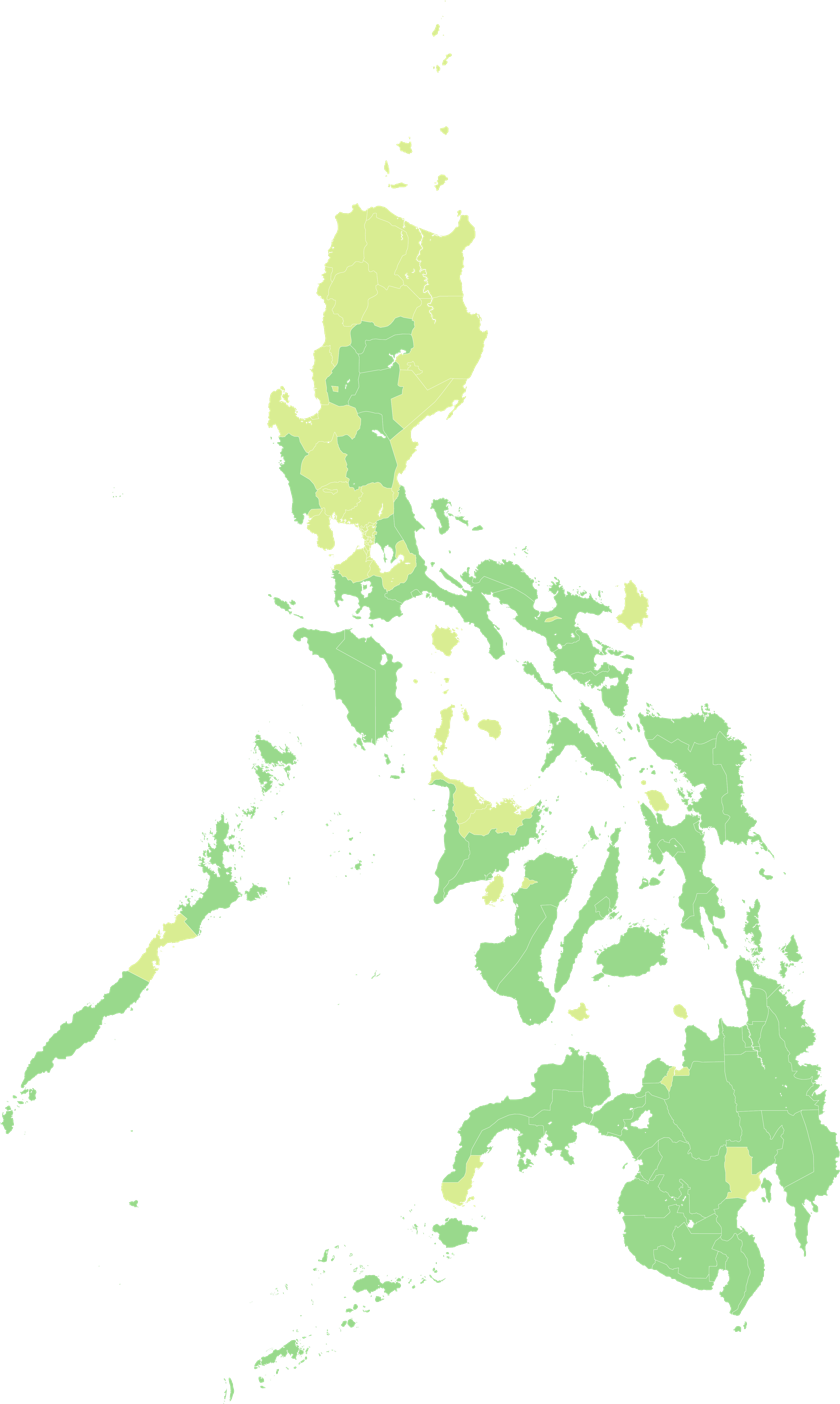
Community quarantines in the Philippines (as of January 5, 2022) Alert Level 5 Alert Level 4 Alert Level 3 Alert Level 2 Alert Level 1

The government implemented varying levels of lockdown and stay-at-home orders across all the country's local government units (LGUs), characterized as "community quarantines". Restrictions were imposed on various aspects of society such as mass public transportation, mass gathering, and operation of businesses. The strictest of these measures was designated as enhanced community quarantine (ECQ), followed by extreme enhanced community quarantine (EECQ), modified enhanced community quarantine (MECQ), general community quarantine (GCQ), and modified general community quarantine (MGCQ).

In September 2021, the government introduced the alert level system (ALS) to replace the old quarantine system, with a pilot in Metro Manila beginning on September 16, 2021. The ALS had five tiers, with Alert Level 1 being the most lenient and Alert Level 5 being the most stringent; measures in a certain area depended on the prevailing alert level. The coverage of the ALS was expanded to include LGUs in Calabarzon, Central Visayas, and Davao regions on October 20, 2021. By November 22, the ALS was adopted by all LGUs.

=== Travel restrictions ===
Travel of foreign nationals to the Philippines was banned in March 2020, with a few exceptions. On March 19, the issuance of visas to all foreign nationals was stopped, and all visas not issued to family members of Filipino nationals were voided. Three days later, a travel ban was imposed on all foreign nationals, excepting spouses and children of Filipino citizens and workers for international or non-governmental organizations accredited in the country.

=== Foreign aid ===
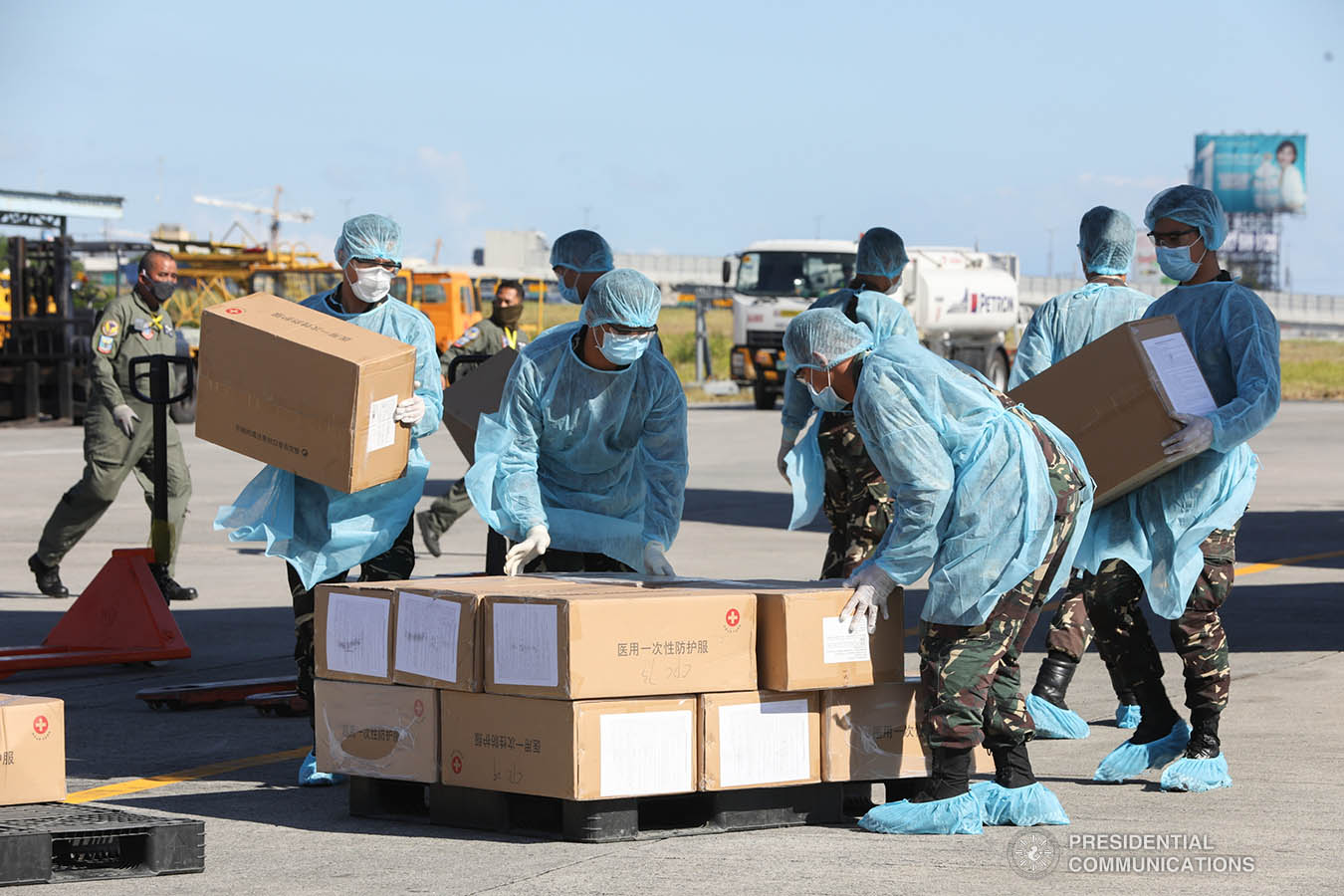
Medical supply aid from China being received by military personnel at Villamor Air Base

The governments of China and the United States pledged support to the Philippine government's response to COVID-19. China announced that it would donate medical supplies, including 100,000 testing kits, 100,000 surgical masks, 10,000 N95 masks, and 10,000 sets of personal protective equipment. The United States Agency for International Development pledged $2.7 million worth of aid to help the Philippines develop adequate testing capabilities and ensure the availability of medical supplies through the agency's "on-the-ground partners". China's aid was received on March 21, 2020.

On March 22, 2020, the Department of Foreign Affairs (DFA) said that the Philippines would be receiving a donation from Singapore consisting of 3,000 testing kits and a polymerase chain reaction machine. In early April 2020, the DFA announced it received 20 units of testing kits, capable of 1,000 tests, from Brunei. The United Arab Emirates donated seven metric tonnes of personal protective equipment in May 2020.

On March 28, 2020, it was disclosed by the Department of Health that some of the test kits made in China were only 40% accurate in testing for signs of the COVID-19. A private foundation donated the test kits.

On July 20, 2021, it was reported that the United States delivered 3,240,850 single-dose Johnson & Johnson vaccines to the Philippines as part of its global effort to help end COVID-19. This is the first time the Philippines has received the Johnson & Johnson vaccine—a safe, trusted, and easy-to-store shot widely used in the US. Before the US delivery of the Johnson & Johnson vaccines, the Philippines had received more than seven million vaccine doses through the COVAX Advance Market Commitment, a global initiative run by Gavi, the Vaccine Alliance to support equitable access to COVID-19 vaccines. By July 2021, total US government COVID-19 assistance to the Philippines amounted to over ₱1.38 billion ($27.5 million).

=== Transition to endemic phase ===
In February 2022, the Philippines Department of Health began shifting towards the endemic phase of COVID-19, despite the WHO's caution that it may be too early to declare. During a media briefing, Health Undersecretary Maria Rosario Vergeire said that the "transition to an endemic state for COVID-19 does not mean that the government would stop its interventions or even remove minimum health protocols such as masking, physical distancing and hand sanitation." WHO Acting Philippine Representative Rajendra Yadav said that while the continued drop in the number of new cases is "encouraging," the country should be careful in moving from the "acute phase" of the pandemic.

The Philippines lifted its outdoor mask mandate in September 2022 and its indoor mask mandate the following month, leaving it in place only in healthcare facilities and on public transportation and medical transport.

By March 2023, cumulative national case totals had stabilized at approximately 4.08 million, showing a plateau in epidemic growth after widespread population immunity from vaccination and prior infection.

Later that year, in July, the COVID-19 pandemic was officially declared no longer a state of emergency. The Department of Health reported that confirmed infections and deaths decreased throughout the year, and thus, COVID-19 monitoring in the Philippines shifted toward routine disease surveillance. Genomic surveillance detected circulating strains that descended from Omicron, but these variants did not cause large surges in infections compared to earlier Delta or early Omicron waves. Public health management focused on maintaining surveillance systems and integrating COVID-19 tracking into broader respiratory disease reporting.

Throughout 2023, the DOH distributed 390,000 booster vaccines to provide additional protection against Omicron subvariants BA.4 and BA.5 to select priority groups of senior citizens and healthcare workers. The government of Lithuania donated the vaccines. Given limited resources, the DOH transitioned from mass population vaccination toward risk-stratified immunization strategies.

In May 2024, infectious disease experts in the Philippines raised concerns about newly emerging SARS-CoV-2 Omicron-derived subvariants. Variants in the "FLiRT" group, including JN.1, KP.2, and KP.3, were associated with mild or self-limiting symptoms in the general population, but senior citizens and immunocompromised individuals were advised to take precautions. Dr. Rontgene Solante, president of the Philippine College of Physicians, explained that the previous COVID-19 vaccines were less effective against the new strains. While new vaccines against the emerging strains existed, they were not available in the Philippines at the time. Additionally, the DOH claimed to have zero budget to distribute COVID-19 vaccines for 2024, including the recommended monovalent XBB.1.5 vaccine to protect against the latest COVID-19 strains.

== Economic impact ==
Map showing real GDP growth rates in 2020, as projected by the IMF

Decline in night light radiance across the Greater Manila Area during the COVID-19 pandemic (March 1 – June 30, 2020) showed a minimized economic activity.

=== Economic indicators ===
==== GDP growth and recession ====
The National Economic and Development Authority (NEDA) revised its economic growth outlook for the Philippines in 2020 from 6.5% to 7.5% gross domestic product (GDP) growth registered in late 2019 to a 5.5% to 6.5% GDP growth, following the pandemic. The NEDA cited the decline in service exports, especially tourism. Moody's Analytics also reduced their GDP growth outlook for the country, from 5.9% in 2019 to 4.9% following the pandemic. Nomura gave a prediction of 1.6% growth, while the International Monetary Fund (IMF) predicted an almost flat growth of 0.6% for 2020 before rebounding to 7.6% in 2021.

Bangko Sentral ng Pilipinas (BSP) Governor Benjamin Diokno and then-NEDA Director-General Ernesto Pernia forecast that the Philippine economy would likely enter a recession in 2020 due to the pandemic. Diokno stated that, although the first quarter was likely to grow by 3% since the Luzon-wide enhanced community quarantine only took effect near the end of the quarter, the second and third quarters would likely experience contractions in economic growth.

The Philippines' real GDP contracted by 0.2% in the first quarter of 2020, the first contraction since the fourth quarter of 1998, a year after the 1997 Asian financial crisis. The Philippines entered a technical recession after the country's GDP decreased by 16.5 percent in the second quarter. The country's GDP continued to contract in the following quarters. Overall, the Philippines' GDP in 2020 saw its worst contraction since World War II according to the Philippine Statistics Authority, posting a growth of −9.5%.

The Philippine economy exited recession in the second quarter of 2021, posting a GDP growth of 11.8%.

In May 2020, NEDA projected the Philippines would suffer an economic loss of up to ₱2.0 trillion due to the pandemic, equivalent to about 9.4% of 2020 nominal GDP, while the Philippine Institute for Development Studies estimated a maximum loss of ₱2.5 trillion. The German Friedrich Naumann Foundation predicted a ₱273 billion loss, while the French Europe Solidaire Sans Frontières envisioned a combined loss of more than ₱1 trillion in the month of April alone.

==== Other indices ====
The pandemic also affected the Philippines' goal of achieving upper-middle-income status by nominal GNI per capita. Before his resignation in April 2020, Ernesto Pernia, then Director-General of the National Economic and Development Authority, said that the country will still achieve this goal by the end of the year, while his replacement Karl Kendrick Chua said in May 2020 that this goal will be achieved in 2022. In April 2020, Daniel Ross of Bloomberg stated that the Philippines, which was "an economic star poised to outpace long-time regional winners such as China, Indonesia and India," would face hindrances amid the COVID-19 pandemic.

The central bank of the Philippines recorded an inflation rate of 2.2% in April and 2.5% in March 2020, compared to 2.6% in February and 2.9% in January. The average rate of 2.6% for January to April 2020 was 1 percentage point lower than the inflation rate for the same period in the previous year. Lower oil prices and transportation costs primarily caused this, while the prices of food supplies, alcoholic beverages, and tobacco rose slightly.

On March 9, 2020, the Philippine Stock Exchange (PSE) index dropped 457.77 points (6.76%), its steepest decline since the 2008 financial crisis. The following day, shares plunged by 6.23% to ₱5,957.35 (US$117.54), settling below the 6,000 level benchmark and entering bear market territory. The mining and oil industries were the most affected with a 9.05% drop, followed by holding companies with a 6.93% drop. The PSE's circuit breaker mechanism was invoked for the second time since the measure's introduction in 2008, halting trade for 15 minutes.

Economist Bernardo Villegas noted that the pandemic has created a situation where the Philippine government "is getting overborrowed" and that the Philippines needs more foreign direct investments to fund capital-intensive industries, including telecommunications and media.

=== Employment ===
The Philippine Statistics Authority (PSA) recorded an estimated unemployment rate of 5.3% in January 2020, the same as January 2019. Moody's Analytics put its estimate at 5.3% for the first quarter of 2020, while Nomura expected 7.5% for Q1 and a 13-year high of 8% in Q2. Meanwhile, the IMF stated that the unemployment rate in the country would be 6.2% in 2020, compared to 5.1% in 2019. A higher rate of 6.8% for 2020 was predicted by S&P Global Ratings.

The Trade Union Congress of the Philippines estimated that around 7,000 people may lose jobs within the first half of 2020 due to the pandemic. Economists from the Ateneo de Manila University estimated that 57% of the country's workforce may be displaced within the end of the first quarter of 2020.

Around 15 million workers in Luzon were laid off due to the enhanced community quarantine, around four million of whom were based in Metro Manila, as well as an estimated 4.3 million workers in Visayas and another 4.3 million in Mindanao that were laid off due to quarantine restrictions.

In March 2020, the Department of Labor and Employment (DOLE) stated that 1.05 million workers were displaced due to the pandemic, even after they released guidelines for employers on handling the impact of COVID-19.

Philippine aviation services were heavily affected by local and international travel restrictions.

In early 2021, there were reports that some employers were requiring their workers to get vaccinated before allowing them to physically report for work, with some workers threatened to be placed on floating status if they did not comply. DOLE released a statement that such practice is illegal; workers should be vaccinated only voluntarily. In Cebu, the business process outsourcing company Select VoiceCom (SVC) launched a ₱1.5-million vaccination incentive program in 2021 for its over 900 employees, which included cash raffles and guaranteed rewards for fully vaccinated staff.

The onset of the COVID-19 pandemic disproportionately impacted female employment, but the Philippines' past efforts to reduce gender inequalities mitigated the negative impact on female employment and educational opportunities.

==== Homelessness ====
The number of homeless people increased during the pandemic, in part due to poverty resulting from the rise in joblessness. In 2021, the House of Representatives declared a housing emergency in the country.

=== Food service and supply ===
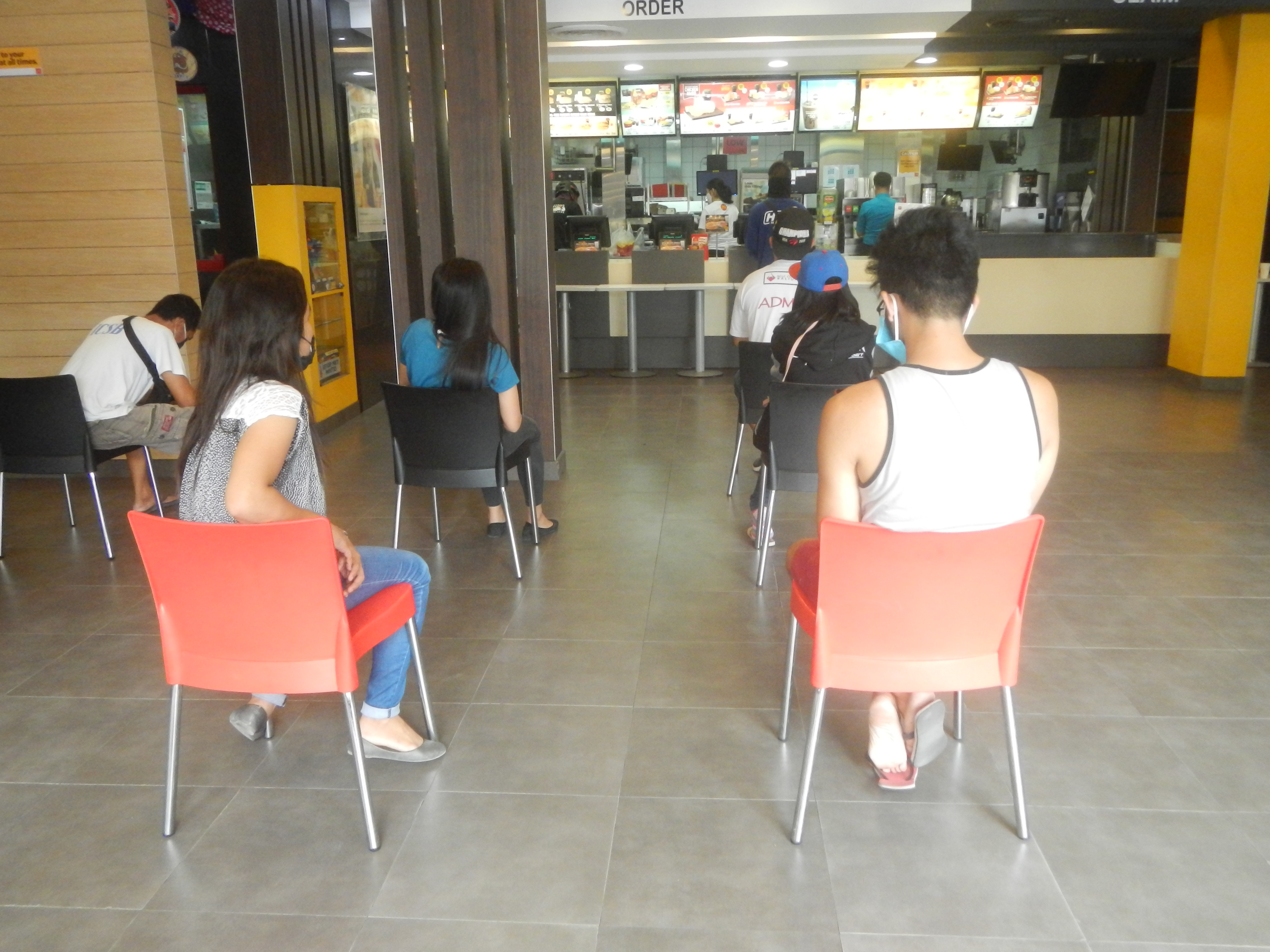
Queuing at a fast food chain in Bulacan

==== Services ====
Following directives from the Philippine government, several fast food and restaurant chains suspended dine-in services and restricted operations to take-out and delivery. Online food ordering services such as GrabFood and Foodpanda temporarily halted during the enhanced community quarantine in Luzon but eventually resumed operations.

Several restaurants and coffee shops across the country offered free food and beverages to front-line professionals involved in the pandemic, especially health care workers.

==== Production and distribution ====
Food production and distribution slowed during the pandemic, especially in Luzon, primarily due to a lack of financial assistance and limited access to transportation resulting from community quarantine measures. The delivery of fresh vegetables from the province of Benguet, which supplies the country with over 80 percent of the country's highland vegetable requirements, was halted due to the implementation of an "extreme enhanced" community quarantine in La Trinidad. Local government officials advised local rice farmers to sell their harvests to them, assuring them that they would help distribute it to their respective communities amid the border restrictions.

On March 27, Vietnam announced that it would reduce its rice production and exports due to food security amid the pandemic. The Philippines, the world's largest importer of rice, imports 25% of its rice from Vietnam. Agriculture Secretary William Dar assured the public there would be "no shortage of the staple during the duration of the enhanced community quarantine and beyond" as "[the] harvest [is] already coming in." Dar also stated the Department of Agriculture planned to initiate early planting in the Cagayan Valley and Central Luzon, two of the largest rice producers in the country, ahead of the third quarter of 2020.

Production of canned fish in the country was adversely affected, with Zamboanga City, which accounts for 85% of the country's canned fish industry, announcing it would reduce the production of canned fish in the Philippines by 50–60% due to difficulties following the city-wide lockdown.

=== Gambling ===
The Philippine Amusement and Gaming Corporation (PAGCOR) ordered the suspension of all gaming operations in the country, including the land-based casinos in Entertainment City and Newport City, on March 15, 2020. The gaming regulator also announced they were limiting the operations of Philippine offshore gaming operations in the region.

Illegal gambling activities conducted online, including online cockfighting or e-sabong, proliferated during the pandemic. PAGCOR aimed to regulate online cockfighting as part of efforts to expand the government's sources of funding.

=== Medical supply ===
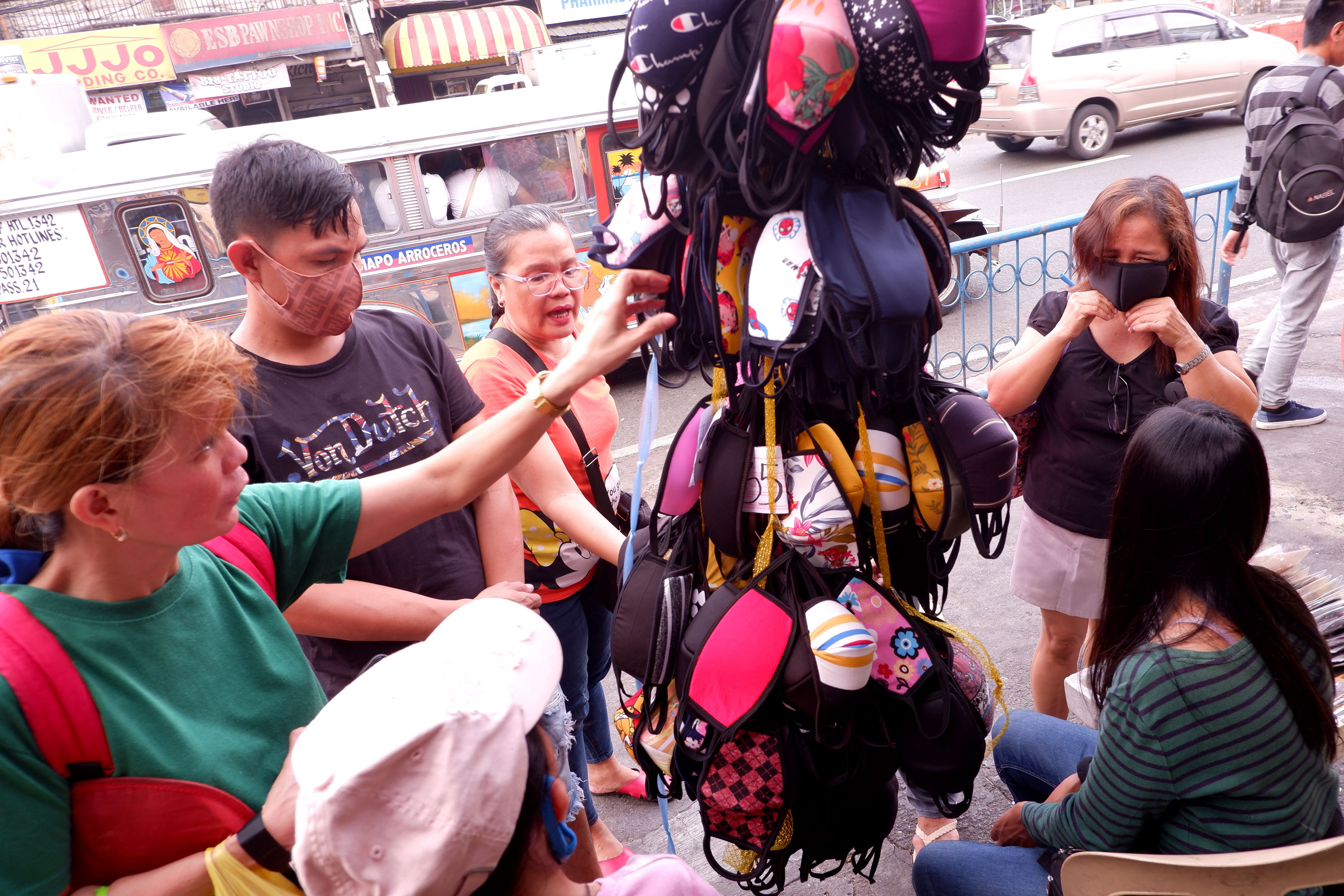
Cloth face masks draw the attention of customers at the Muñoz Market in Quezon City due to the limited supply and higher price of surgical masks.

A shortage of medical masks was reported across the country amid pandemic-related concerns. RITM director Celia Carlos urged the public against hoarding masks to ensure ample supply for medical workers directly dealing with patients suspected or confirmed to have COVID-19. The Department of Trade and Industry (DTI), in cooperation with the Philippine National Police, acted against reports of traders hoarding face masks and selling them at an overpriced rate. The DTI also directed its Philippine International Trading Corp. to import 5 million masks from overseas. Medtecs International Corp. Ltd., the sole manufacturer of medical masks in the country, committed to supply the government through the DTI. However, due to Philippine procurement law, local manufacturers had difficulty competing with foreign suppliers that were cheaper but may have substandard quality.

Doctors in the Philippines deplored shortages in personal protective equipment amid the pandemic, which was cited by some as the cause of high infection rate and death rate of healthcare workers in the country. To address this issue, the Philippine government continued to procure and stockpile such equipment.

According to Health Undersecretary Maria Rosario Vergeire, the country has also issued requests for ventilators and respirators for severe or critical COVID-19 patients, as there are reported shortages of this equipment.

=== Retail ===
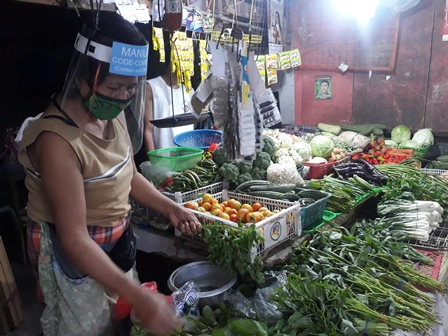
A public market vendor in Manila wearing a cellulose acetate face shield. Use of face shields along with face masks is mandatory in public places.

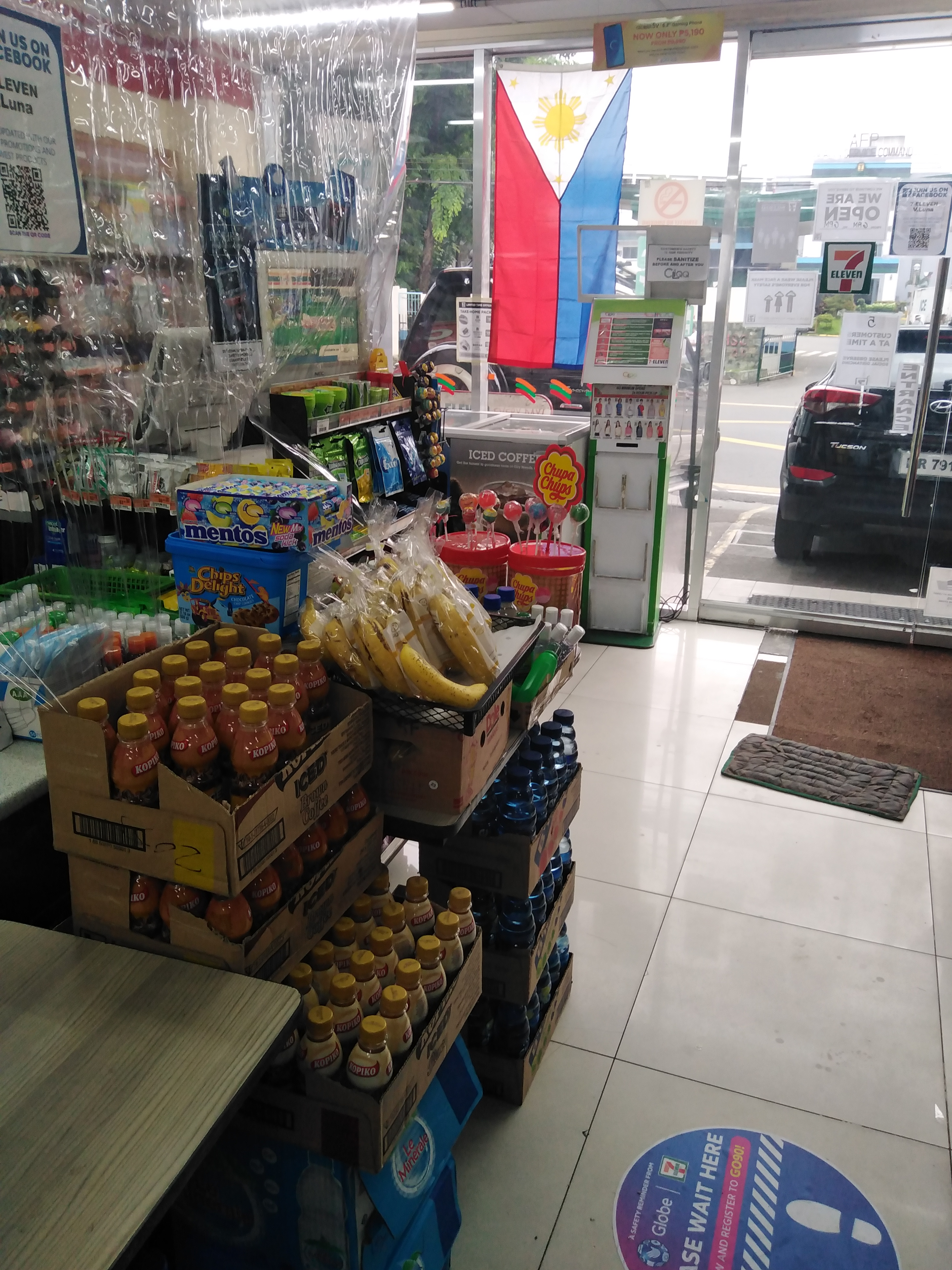
Setup of the counter area of a convenience store in Quezon City. Plastic sheets are installed to limit COVID-19 transmission.

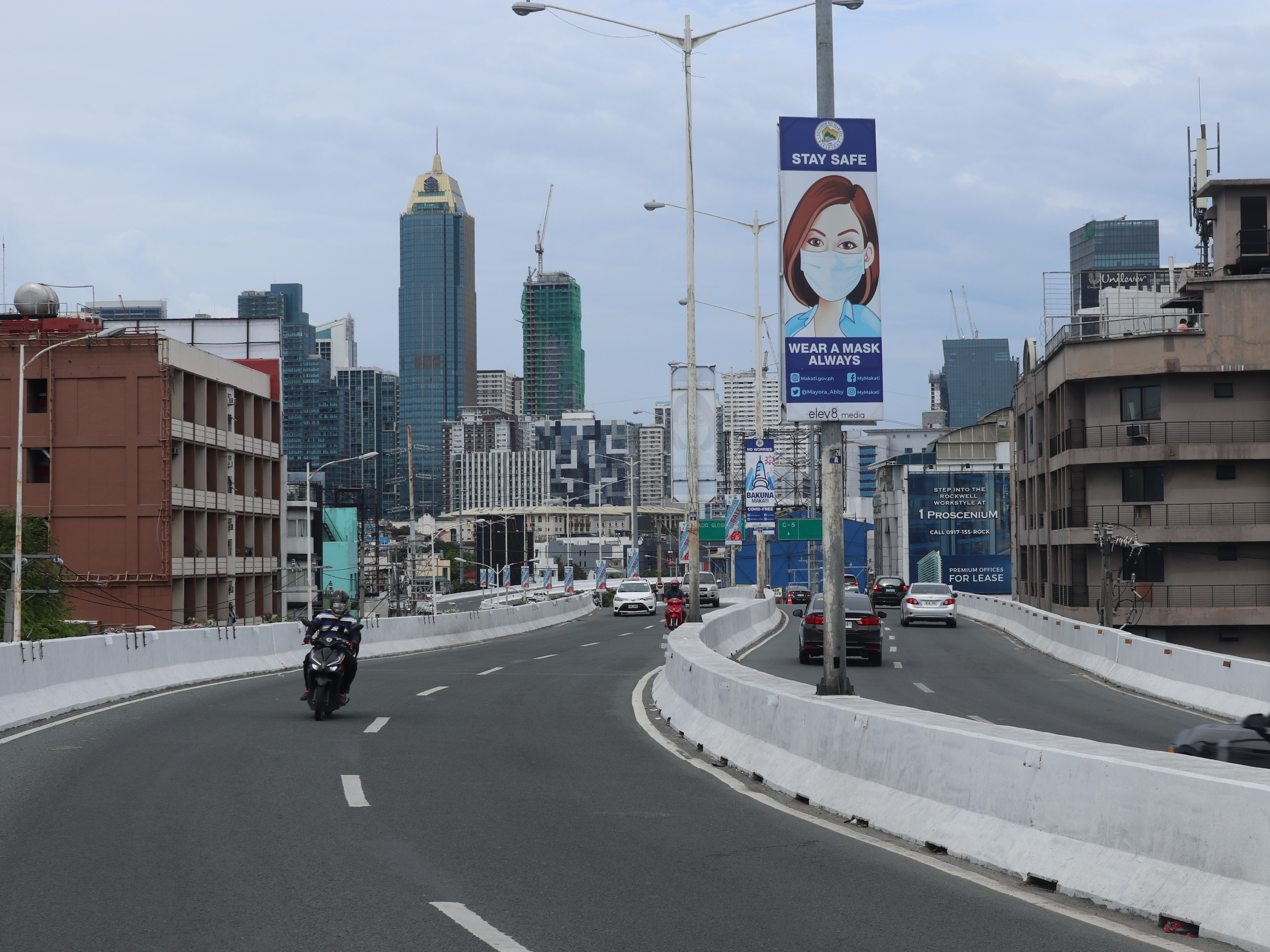
Banners reminding health protocols are displayed along Kalayaan Flyover, Makati City

According to the Philippine Retailers Association, the "total retail environment" declined by 30–50%. SM Investments, the country's largest retailer, saw domestic sales decline by 10–20%. Despite the decline, most retail stores providing essential services, including supermarkets, convenience stores, hardware stores, and pharmacies, remained open across the country to sustain consumers while other establishments at malls closed down. Stores imposed strict social distancing measures, with some supermarkets only allowing 50 customers inside at a time and placing stickers on the floor to indicate that customers must stand one meter apart from each other. Stores were also regularly disinfected, and customers were required to undergo a temperature check before entering. In the Greater Manila Area, several online grocers continued to operate with limited delivery slots. After most industries in the country were closed for two months, many stores in the retail sector were allowed to open under revised community quarantine guidelines.

Panic buying and hoarding became rampant across the country, especially with essential goods such as food and sanitation products. The Philippine Amalgamated Supermarkets Association reported that purchases of masks, alcohol, and other personal hygiene products in supermarkets across the country had surged, and urged the public against panic buying.

Economic think-tank Fitch Solutions forecasted that the consumer and retail sector, especially non-essential businesses, would be one of the hardest-hit sectors in the Philippines, as it would lose sales revenue for an entire month due to the Luzon enhanced community quarantine (Luzon accounts for 73% of the country's GDP). Fitch Solutions also forecasted the household final consumption expenditure for the country in 2020 to expand by 6.7% year-over-year, which was adjusted from a "pre-coronavirus projection" for 2020 of 7%.

Mall operators across the country, such as Ayala, Megaworld, SM, Robinsons, and Vista, initially shortened the operating hours of their malls to comply with government quarantine measures. Malls were also asked to implement social distancing measures; for example, several malls implemented a "single-seat gap" policy in cinemas, in which moviegoers were required to sit one seat apart from each other. Most malls in the country later limited their operations to establishments providing essential services, particularly groceries, banks, and hardware stores.

=== Travel ===
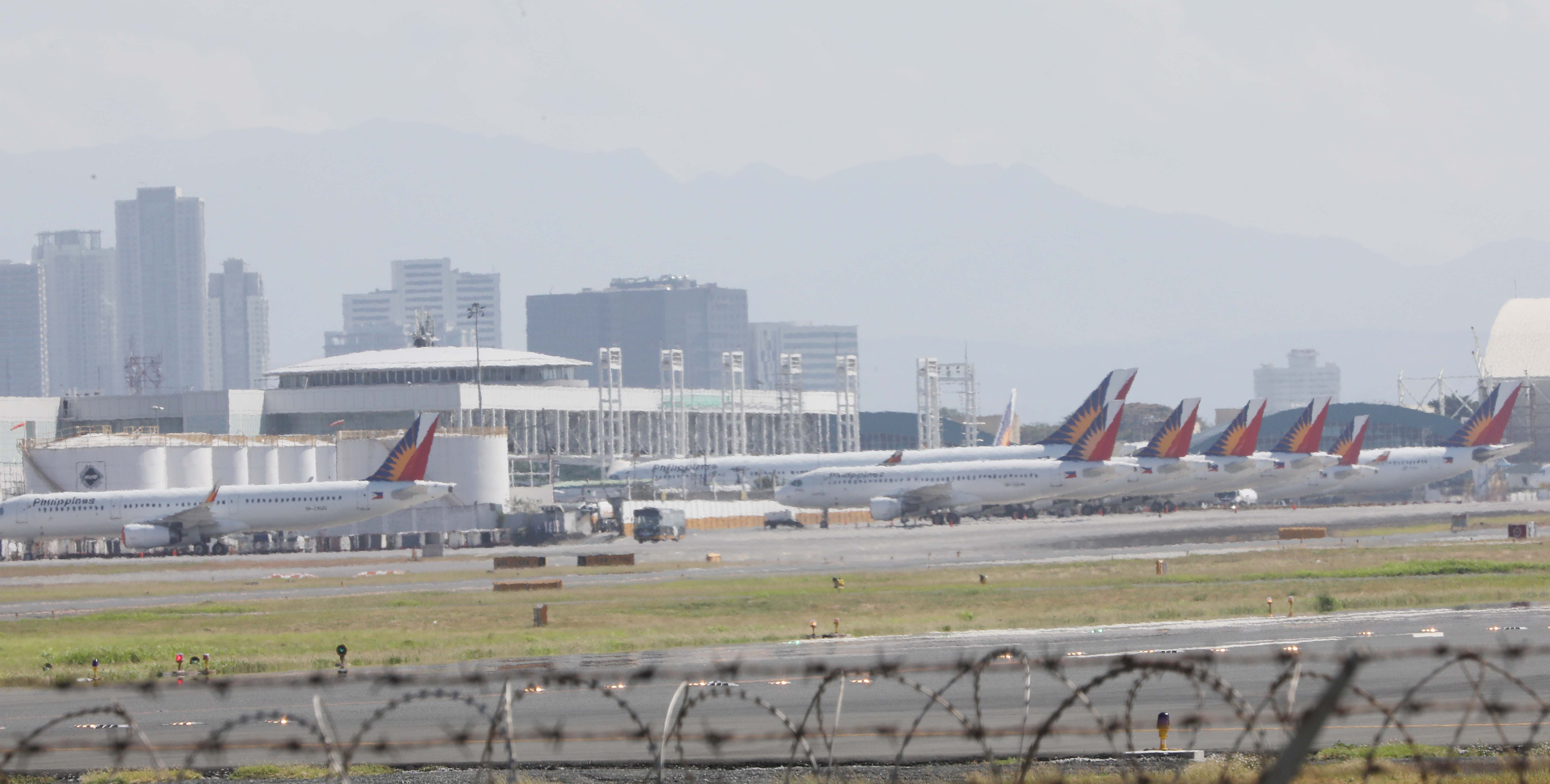
Grounded planes at Ninoy Aquino International Airport, March 2020

In response to the imposition of travel bans by the Philippine government and some foreign governments, local airlines AirAsia, Philippine Airlines, and Cebu Pacific suspended flights as early as February 2, 2020, covering routes involving destinations in China, Hong Kong, and Macau. Philippine Airlines had suspended all of its flights by March 2020, although the airline announced plans to resume selected flights by June 1, 2020.

== Social impact ==
=== Census ===
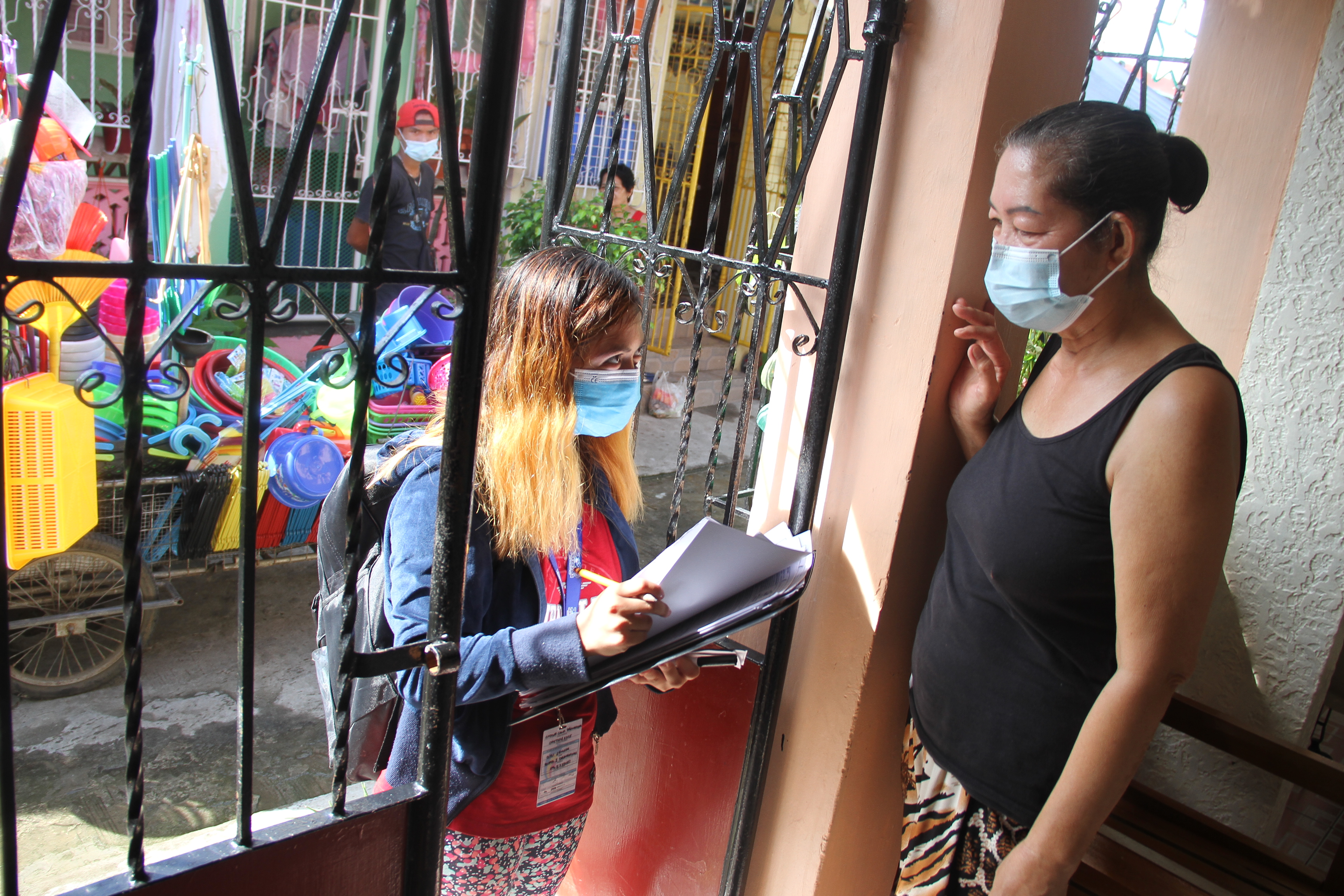
A census enumerator interviewing a resident of Dasmariñas in October 2020

The 2020 census was originally slated for May but was postponed and conducted in September. As the quarantine measures were eased, the Philippine Statistics Authority (PSA) started conducting the census in September, though some, such as representative Rufus Rodriguez, said it was not worth the risk.

=== Education ===
==== 2019–20 academic year ====
Suspension of classes in response to the COVID-19 pandemic began as early as March 2020. On March 16, the Department of Education (DepEd) issued guidelines prohibiting public schools in areas with suspended classes from administering final examinations, instead requiring them to compute students' final grades for the 2019–20 academic year based on "their current academic standing". They directed schools in other areas to administer final examinations that week on a "staggered basis" and asked teachers and students to observe social distancing measures.

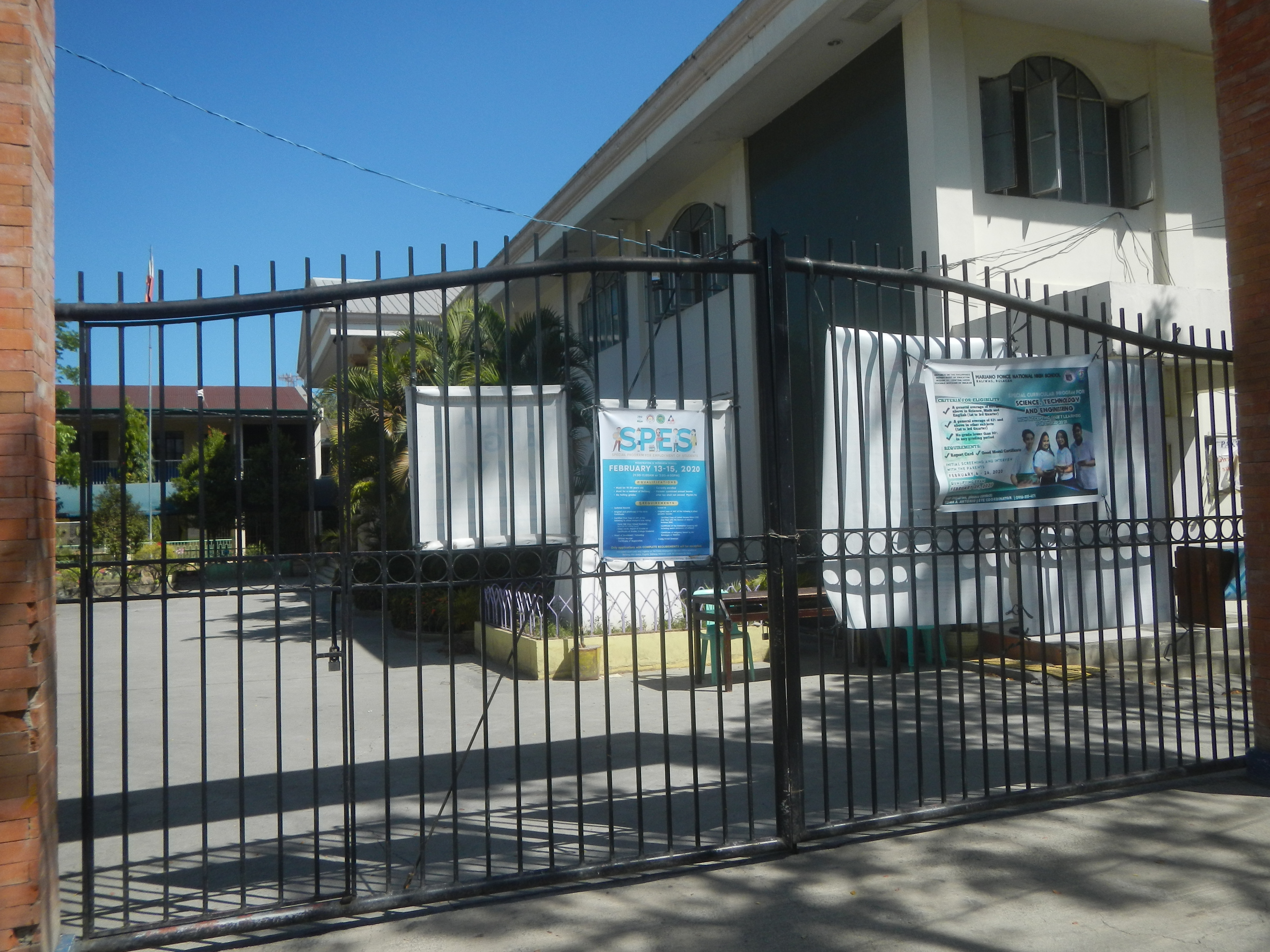
Gates of a public high school in Baliuag, Bulacan closed due to the suspension of classes

The Commission on Higher Education (CHED) advised institutions of higher education to implement distance education methods and educational technology to maximize the academic term despite the suspensions. Some universities implemented online learning alternatives, but following the announcement of the enhanced community quarantine in Luzon and other areas, many colleges and universities suspended mandatory online classes in consideration of the welfare of their students, faculty, and staff. Academic administration offices continued to operate with a skeleton crew, while other offices in colleges and universities operated via remote work arrangements. Some schools, however, continued to hold online classes; in response, several student groups appealed to the CHED to suspend mandatory online classes in consideration of the logistical limitations and student well-being.

Live classes in all levels across the country were eventually suspended due to the pandemic. Graduation rites in Philippine schools were either canceled, postponed, or held virtually.

The procedure for automatic class suspensions in connection to PAGASA typhoon warning signals remained in effect even as classes were held via distance learning.

==== 2020–21 academic year ====
Republic Act No. 11480 was signed into law to allow classes to start after the last day of August, which was previously illegal. The Department of Education moved the opening of classes to October 5, 2020. Earlier in June, officials reported that schools will not open until a vaccine is available, though remote learning would resume at the end of August. A group of University of the Philippines experts proposed pushing the start of classes to December to limit the spread of the disease. CHED left the decision of starting semesters to college administrators, though they urged shifting to the new semestral calendar, starting "flexible classes" in August and face-to-face classes in September.

Several measures were proposed to reopen classes, including airing lectures on television and radio, implementing a mandatory face-mask policy, maintaining physical distancing, and limiting class sizes.

==== Re-allowing of face-to-face classes ====
According to UNICEF, the Philippines was among the last countries to re-allow the conduct of face-to-face classes, with the only other country yet to allow live classes being Venezuela as of September 2021. On November 5, 2021, CHED allowed college campuses in localities under alert level 2 to conduct face-to-face classes at 50 percent capacity if certain conditions were met, such as a high student/faculty vaccination rate and retrofitted classrooms. The DepEd conducted a pilot run of face-to-face classes in 100 public schools starting November 15, 2021 and in 20 private schools starting November 22. Schools reopened in-person classes with blended learning on August 22, 2022, and in-person classes resumed in full on November 2.

==== Learning loss ====
Students in the Philippines experienced learning loss and increased incidence of mental health issues during the pandemic, according to the United Nations Educational, Scientific and Cultural Organization.

=== Tourism ===
The NEDA reported that the coronavirus pandemic would incur a ₱22.7 billion ($448 million) monthly loss of tourism revenue for the Philippines, and the impact would likely last around five to six months, based on past experiences from the SARS, H1N1, and MERS outbreaks. Over 5,200 flights across two months, to be serviced by member airlines of the Air-Carriers Association of the Philippines, were canceled. In March 2020, the Asian Development Bank predicted a ₱111 billion ($2.2 billion) loss in the tourism sector, while in February the Tourism Congress of the Philippines estimated the figures at around ₱20 billion ($395 million), considering that 12.7% of the Philippines' GDP is generated through tourism. Europe Solidaire Sans Frontières also reported potential damage to Philippine tourism.

The National Museum of the Philippines temporarily closed its Manila complex and all branch museums across the country.

The Philippine Shopping Festival, a nationwide mall sale event backed by the Department of Tourism originally scheduled March 1–31, 2020, was postponed due to the COVID-19 pandemic. Several local festivals across the country were also either canceled or postponed.

=== Prisons ===
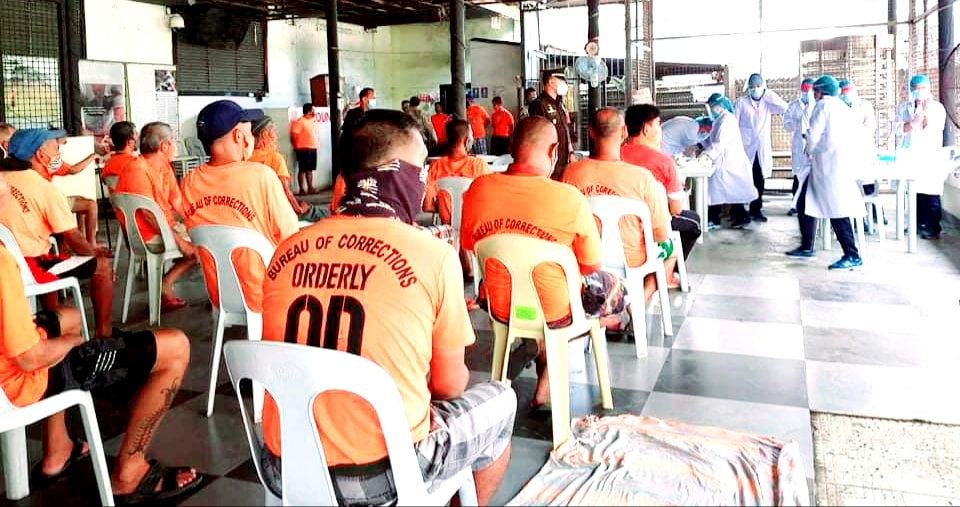
Detainees at the New Bilibid Prison getting tested for COVID-19

The impact of COVID-19 in prisons in the Philippines was projected to be "dangerous" since its jails have the highest occupancy rate in the world (534%). The Bureau of Jail Management and Penology temporarily suspended the acceptance of visitors in prisons it manages as early as March 2020, encouraging use of the e-dalaw service which allows inmates to communicate with relatives online.

Certain human rights groups raised their concerns about the issue. Human Rights Watch flagged cases of dying inmates in prison cells and called for the freedom of minor offenders, the elderly, and the ill. Karapatan and KAPATID both called for the release of vulnerable political prisoners as a way to decongest Philippine jails amidst the COVID-19 pandemic.

A group of 22 high-risk prisoners (either of old age, immunocompromised, or pregnant) asked for temporary liberty on "humanitarian grounds" since "hellish prison conditions in the Philippines make the detainees vulnerable to COVID-19." All 22 prisoners, five of whom were consultants of the New People's Army, asked to be allowed to post bail or be released under personal recognizance. They were represented by the Public Interest Law Center and the National Union of People's Lawyers (NUPL). Similarly, one of the suspects in the death of Horacio "Atio" Castillo III pleaded for freedom due to the COVID-19 threat.

In mid-April, the Supreme Court reiterated its 2014 circular, which allows the temporary freedom of "persons deprived of liberty" who were able to serve their minimum penalty during an ongoing trial or those whose trials are paused due to lack of witnesses. Chief Justice of the Supreme Court Diosdado Peralta and Justice Secretary Menardo Guevarra signed resolutions that relax bail prices for indigent inmates and requirements to avail parole and executive clemency. On May 2, Associate Justice Mario Victor Leonen announced that 9,731 detainees were temporarily released by the Supreme Court from March 17 to April 29 to alleviate overcrowding in the country's prisons.

=== Entertainment and media ===
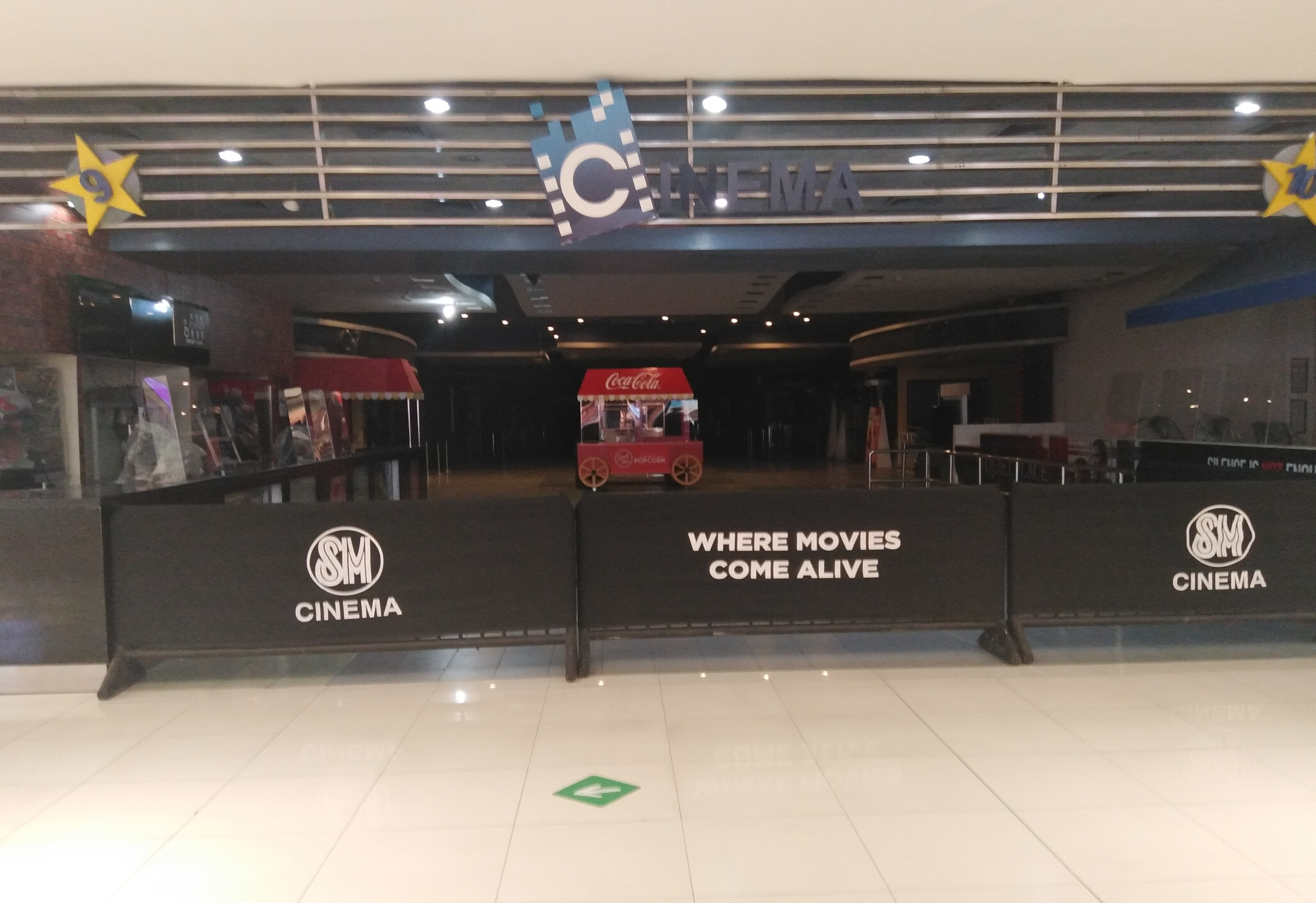
A cinema at SM Megamall, closed in response to the pandemic

On February 10, 2020, the DOH issued an advisory advising the cancellation of large public events and mass gatherings until further notice to minimize the risk of disease transmission. This prompted several local and international artists to either cancel or postpone their scheduled concerts and fan meets.

Local television networks temporarily stopped admitting live audiences for their television shows, including variety shows Eat Bulaga! and All-Out Sundays on GMA Network as well as It's Showtime and ASAP on ABS-CBN. On March 13, both ABS-CBN and GMA announced they would suspend production on their entertainment programs by March 15, replacing affected programs with reruns of previous series or extended newscast runs.

Broadcast radio companies also curtailed their operations during the quarantine period, shortening their broadcast hours and/or suspending regular programming in favor of "special broadcasts".

Media watchdogs noted that during the pandemic, free speech and press freedom were subject to increased legal and administrative restrictions in the Philippines. In 2021, during the commemoration of World Press Freedom Day, the Committee to Protect Journalists said that harassment, arrests, and killings of journalists by agents of the state continued during the pandemic.

=== Religion ===
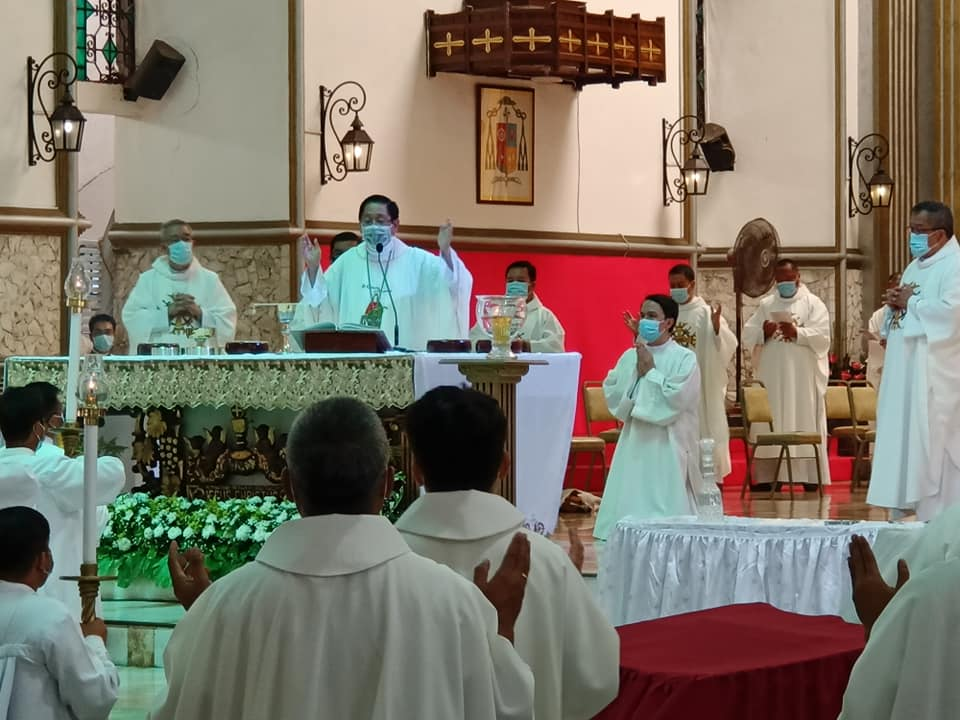
Chrism Mass of the Roman Catholic Diocese of Dumaguete, August 4, 2020

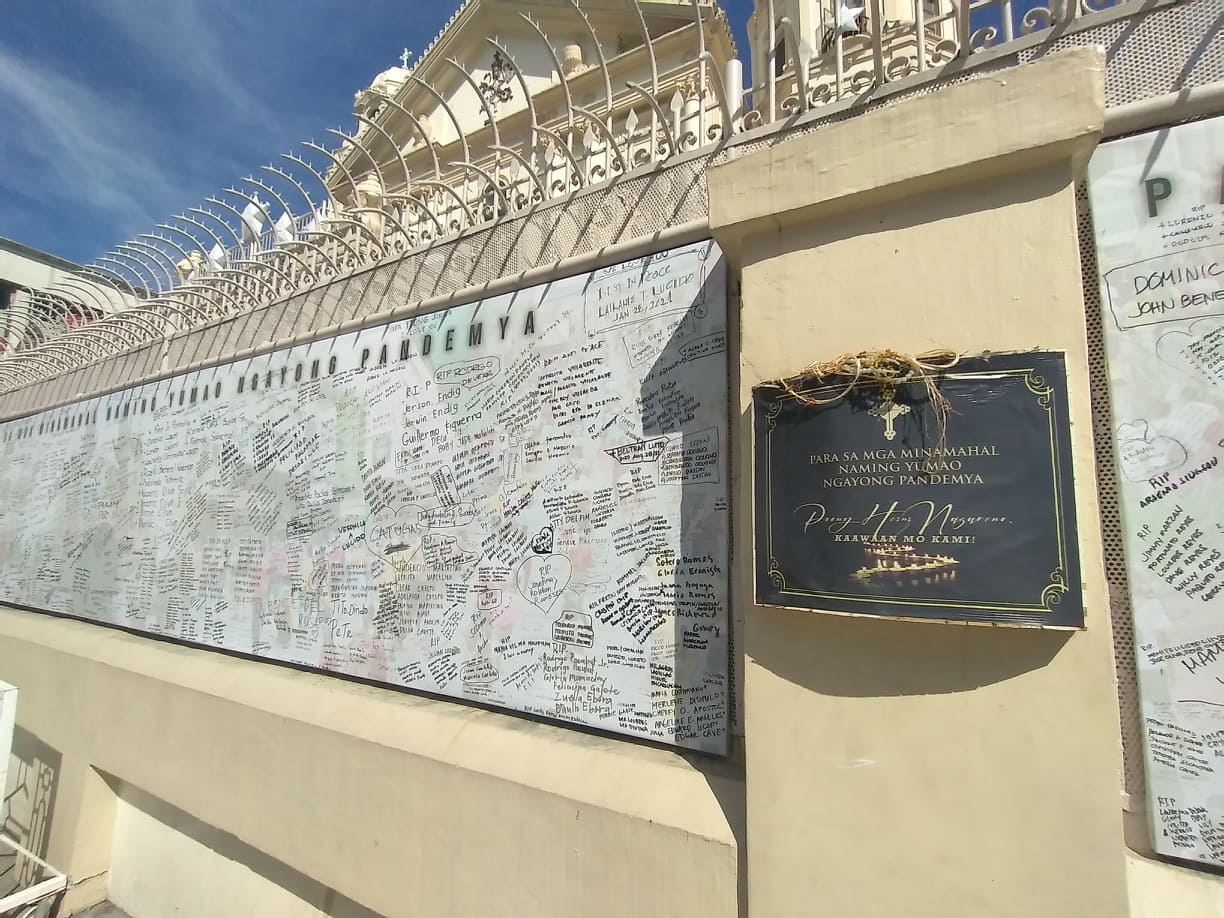
Wall of Remembrance of COVID-19 Victims, Quiapo Church

The Roman Catholic Church in the Philippines issued preventive guidelines against the pandemic through the Catholic Bishops' Conference of the Philippines (CBCP). In January 2020, the CBCP issued a liturgical guideline which urged Mass attendees to "practice ordinarily" the receiving of communion by hand and avoid holding hands while praying the Lord's Prayer during Mass. As a spiritual measure against the spread of the disease, the CBCP also composed an oratio imperata (obligatory prayer) to be recited during Mass. In February 2020, the CBCP issued a second liturgical guideline in anticipation of the Lenten season. The bishops suggested that during Ash Wednesday, ashes would be sprinkled on the faithful's head instead of the customary marking of the forehead with a cross, to minimize body contact. The CBCP also urged people to refrain from kissing or touching the cross for veneration during Good Friday, particularly the celebration of the Passion of Jesus, suggesting genuflection or bowing instead. Dioceses across the country suspended public celebration of Masses. On April 8, Holy Wednesday, the CBCP organized an interfaith prayer service against the spread of the coronavirus which was televised nationwide.

Other Christian denominations and organizations, such as the Iglesia ni Cristo and the Jehovah's Witnesses, suspended live worship services, instead organizing worship services through online platforms. The Philippine Council of Evangelical Churches, an organization composed of Evangelical and Protestant church member organizations in the country, adopted similar measures.

The Church of Jesus Christ of Latter-day Saints directed non-native missionaries assigned to the Philippines to be temporarily reassigned to another country. They were also ordered to self-quarantine in their new homes for 14 days.

The Islamic community in the Philippines also adopted measures against COVID-19; for example, the Regional Darul Ifta' of Bangsamoro suspended all congregational prayers in the Bangsamoro region from March 19 to April 10.

=== Sports ===
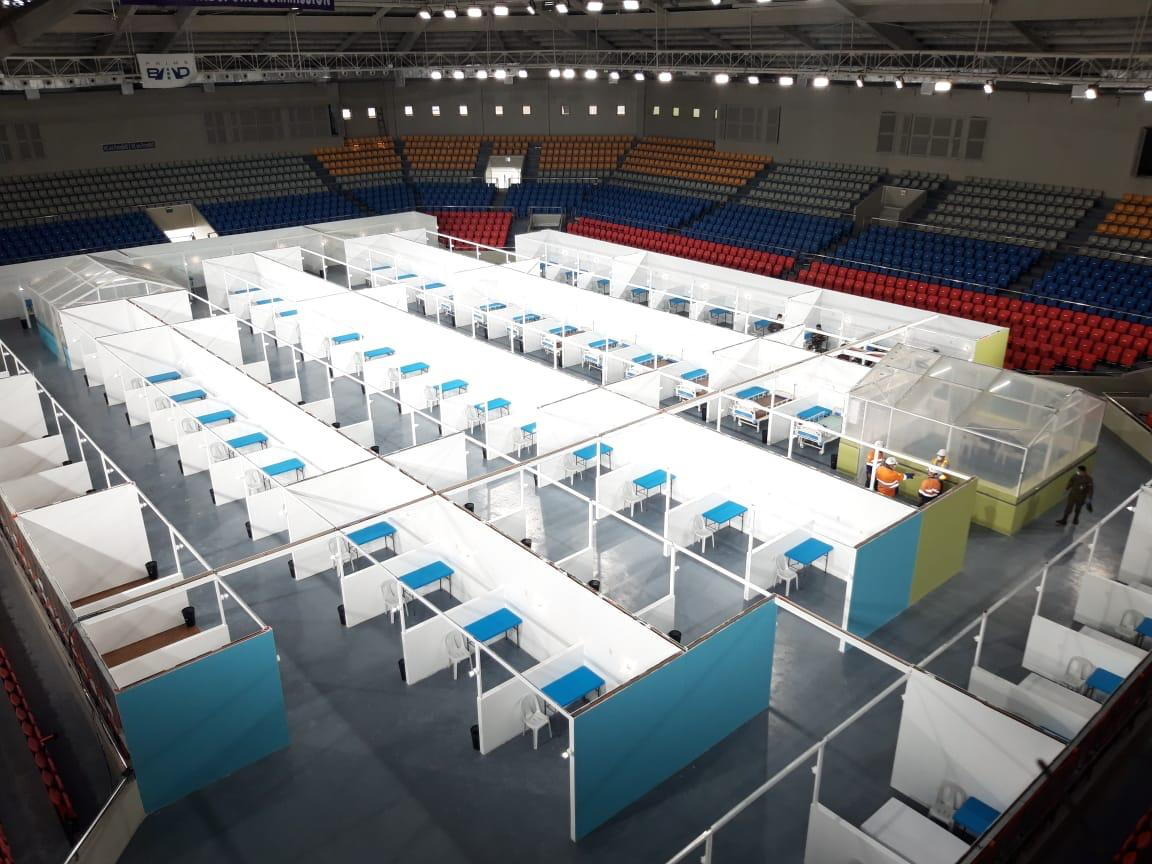
Several sports facilities, including the Ninoy Aquino Stadium of the Rizal Memorial Sports Complex, were converted into temporary quarantine facilities for COVID-19 patients.

Several ongoing or scheduled seasons of sports leagues in the Philippines, such as the ASEAN Basketball League, Maharlika Pilipinas Basketball League, Philippine Basketball Association, National Basketball League, Philippines Football League, and Philippine Super Liga, were suspended. Upcoming sporting competitions hosted by the country, specifically the Badminton Asia Championships (initially scheduled to be hosted in Wuhan but later moved to Manila) and the AFF Women's Championship, were postponed. Regional qualification games involving Philippine national teams were likewise postponed.

On April 29, 2020, the Philippine Sports Commission announced they would cancel all of their sporting events until December 2020 to comply with government directives that prohibit mass gathering events, including the Palarong Pambansa in Marikina, the Philippine National Games, and the ASEAN Para Games.

=== Elections ===
On March 10, 2020, the Commission on Elections suspended nationwide voter registration until the end of the month due to the COVID-19 pandemic. The registration period began on January 20, 2020, and was originally scheduled to run until September 30, 2021. The suspension was later extended until the end of April. The issuance of voter certifications was also suspended until further notice. The plebiscite to ratify legislation proposing the partition of Palawan into three smaller provinces, initially scheduled for May 2020, was also delayed due to the pandemic.

=== Misinformation and hoaxes ===
After the initial outbreak of the COVID-19 pandemic in the Philippines, conspiracy theories, misinformation, and disinformation emerged online about the disease's origin, scale, prevention, treatment, and other aspects.

The DOH advised against spreading misinformation and unverified claims concerning the pandemic. The Philippine National Police took action against the spread of misinformation related to the pandemic, warning that misinformation purveyors could be charged with violating Presidential Decree No. 90 for "declaring local rumor, mongering and spreading false information". Those circulating misinformation online could be charged with violating the Cybercrime Prevention Act, which has a maximum penalty of imprisonment for 12 years. The Bayanihan to Heal as One Act also punished fake news peddlers with two months jail time or a fine of up to ₱1 million.

==== Foreign campaigns ====
According to a report by Reuters, the United States ran a propaganda campaign from the spring of 2020 to mid-2021 to spread disinformation about the Chinese Sinovac COVID-19 vaccine, including using fake social media accounts to spread the false claim that the vaccine contained pork-derived ingredients and was therefore haram under Islamic law. The campaign primarily targeted people in the Philippines and used a social media hashtag "#ChinaAngVirus", Tagalog for "China is the virus".

A 2025 Reuters report found that the Embassy of China in Manila hired a local marketing firm to conduct a covert "public opinion guidance" astroturfing campaign that included promoting Sinovac's CoronaVac vaccine in the country.

== Statistics ==
Starting in 2020, the DOH published official numbers through its daily case bulletins at 4:00 pm PhST.

=== By demographic ===
In the table below, the general lethality of COVID-19 in the Philippines is presently around 1.6%. To compare the three well-known coronavirus diseases, the case fatality rate of the 2002 severe acute respiratory syndrome (SARS) outbreak was 11%, while that of the 2012 Middle East respiratory syndrome (MERS) outbreak was 36%.

Confirmed COVID-19 cases in the Philippines by gender and age
Classification		Cases		Deaths		Lethality (%)
Classification		Number	(%)	Number	(%)	Lethality (%)
All		2,206,021	(100.0)	34,978	(100.0)	(1.59)
Sex	Male	1,120,198	50.78	19,799	56.60	(0.9)
Sex	Female	1,085,823	49.22	15,179	43.40	(0.69)
Age
Age	Above 80	36,903	1.67	4,701	13.44	(0.21)
Age	70–79	86,874	3.94	7,953	22.74	(0.36)
Age	60–69	178,538	8.09	9,475	27.09	(0.43)
Age	50–59	273,733	12.41	6,457	18.46	(0.29)
Age	40–49	340,294	15.43	3,314	9.47	(0.15)
Age	30–39	491,555	22.28	1,692	4.84	(0.08)
Age	20–29	540,925	24.52	808	2.31	(0.04)
Age	10–19	161,022	7.30	231	0.66	(0.01)
Age	0–9	93,629	4.24	332	0.95	(0.02)
Age	n/d	2,548	0.12	15	0.04	(0.0)
Source: Department of Health's COVID-19 Tracker Archived February 10, 2020, at the Wayback Machine and Situationer

View source data.
View source data.
View source data.

=== Progression charts ===
View source data.
View source data.
View source data.
View source data.

== See also ==
- 2009 swine flu pandemic in the Philippines
- 2019–2021 polio outbreak in the Philippines
- 2019 measles outbreak in the Philippines
