= Timeline of the COVID-19 pandemic in the Philippines (2020) =

This article attempts to document the timeline of the COVID-19 pandemic in the Philippines in 2020.

== Timeline ==
=== January ===
- January 29 - Department of Health (DOH) Secretary Francisco Duque III announced that the country is now equipped to test samples for novel coronavirus through the Research Institute for Tropical Medicine (RITM) in Muntinlupa. Previously, the said laboratory could only test samples for SARS-CoV and MERS-CoV, and DOH had been sending samples to the Victorian Infectious Diseases Reference Laboratory (VIDRL) in Melbourne, Australia.
- January 30 - DOH confirmed the first case of COVID-19 in the country, from a 38-year-old Chinese woman after her confirmatory test results arrived from VIDRL. The said Chinese together with her husband which is a 44-years-old-Chinese national, arrived in the country from Wuhan, China via a Hong Kong-Cebu flight on January 21, 2020; travelled and arrived in Dumaguete on January 22, 2020; then they took a flight to Manila and finally admitted in San Lazaro Hospital on the same day on January 25, 2020, after experiencing symptoms.

=== February ===
- February 2 – DOH confirmed the second case of novel coronavirus, which also then became the first recorded death outside China. Died on February 1, 2020, the said case is a 44-year-old-male Chinese companion of the first reported carrier.
- February 5
  - The first confirmed case of a Filipino citizen outside the Philippines was announced. The case is of a crew member of the cruise ship Diamond Princess quarantined off the coast of Yokohama, Japan. A total of 7 passengers and 531 crew members of the said ship are Filipinos. Eventually, 41 of them became confirmed cases.
  - The third case in the country was confirmed, from a 60-year-old Chinese woman from Wuhan. She traveled from Wuhan via a Hong Kong-Cebu flight on January 20, and headed directly to Bohol. On January 22, she admitted in an undisclosed hospital in Tagbilaran City after experiencing symptoms. It is also the first reported case in the Visayas, Central Visayas, and Bohol.
- February 9–22 – Repatriates from Wuhan were quarantined at the New Clark City in Capas, Tarlac. None of them displayed any symptoms during the quarantine period and was released after they were cleared for the disease.

=== March ===
- March 5
  - The fourth case is a 48-year-old male Filipino lawyer and employee of Deloitte at Bonifacio Global City in Taguig, who had recent travel history in Japan and later admitted at RITM. It is the first case of a Filipino citizen inside the country.
  - The fifth case is a 62-year-old male Filipino resident of Cainta, Rizal and later succumbed.
- March 6
  - The sixth case is the 59-year-old wife of the fifth case diagnosed on March 5, also a resident of Cainta, Rizal, and eventually deceased.
  - The Department of Health confirmed that the fifth case was the first local transmission in the country. Code Red Sub-Level 1 was also raised as a precautionary measure.
- March 8
  - Four new cases were confirmed on March 8:
    - The seventh case is a 38-year-old-male Taiwanese national who got infected by another Taiwanese national that recently visited the Philippines. His symptoms began appearing on March 3 and later admitted at Makati Medical Center.
    - The eighth case is a 32-year-old-male Filipino citizen, a resident of Pasig City that recently visited Japan in the past two weeks. His symptoms began appearing on March 5 and later admitted at St. Luke's Medical Center – Global City.
    - The ninth case is an 86-year-old-male American national with pre-existing hypertension that recently traveled to the US and South Korea. His symptoms began appearing on March 1 and later admitted at The Medical City-SM City Marikina.
    - The tenth case is a 57-year-old-male Filipino citizen, resident of Quezon City with no travel history outside of the country. He had contact with confirmed COVID-19 cases but his exposure is still under investigation by the DOH.
- March 9
  - President Duterte has formally declared a state of public health emergency in the Philippines. The president also suspended all classes, in public and private, in Metro Manila from March 10 to 14 and confirmed four more cases, totaling 24 cases.
  - Ten new cases were initially confirmed on March 9, totaling 20 cases. Included in the list are the following:
    - San Juan City confirmed its first case, which is also the eleventh case, a 72-year-old-male Filipino resident with no travel history and later admitted at St. Luke's Medical Center-QC.
    - Cavite reported its first case, also the 20th case, a 48-year-old-male Filipino resident of Imus with recent travel history in Japan.
    - Bulacan logged its first case, a 58-year-old-female Filipino resident of San Jose del Monte and later admitted at Dr. Jose N. Rodriguez Memorial Hospital-Caloocan. This also became the first confirmed case in Caloocan.
- March 10 – Eleven new cases were initially confirmed on March 10. The DOH later corrected that two cases were repeat tests, totaling 33 cases.
  - Confirmed first 2 Filipino crew members from MV Diamond Princess cruise, a 31-year-old-male Negros Oriental and a 34-year-old-male from Camarines Sur. They were later admitted at the Jose B. Lingad Memorial Regional Hospital in Pampanga.
- March 11 – Sixteen new cases were confirmed on March 11, totaling 49 cases.
  - The Wack Wack Golf and Country Club in Mandaluyong temporarily closed after one of its guests, a Singaporean permanent resident, was confirmed to have contracted COVID-19.
  - Mandaluyong confirmed first case, a 53-year-old Filipino male and was later admitted at the St. Luke's Medical Center – Quezon City.
  - Negros Oriental logged its first case, a 64-year-old-male local official of Tayasan, and had a history of travel to Greenhills, San Juan, where a cluster of COVID-19 cases was confirmed. He was later admitted at Ace Dumaguete Doctors Hospital.
  - Confirmed first case in Mindanao, a 54-year-old male resident of Lanao del Sur. He works in Pasig City but came home to his province. He was first admitted at the Adventist Medical Center in Iligan, but later transferred to Northern Mindanao Medical Center, and died on March 13. The patient also became the first case of COVID-19 for Cagayan de Oro, Iligan, and Lanao del Sur.
- March 12
  - Three new cases were confirmed on March 12, totaling 52 cases.
    - Las Piñas City confirmed its first case, a 53-year-old-male Filipino with no travel history and was confined at Las Piñas General Hospital and Trauma Center.
  - Vice-president Robredo on March 12 addressed the public about COVID-19. The vice-president urged the government to adopt work from home, fast-track the process of test-kits, and protect the vulnerable from the pandemic.
  - President Duterte announces a partial lockdown on Metro Manila beginning at midnight on March 15 that will cover 16 cities and one municipality. Land, domestic air, and domestic sea travel to and from Metro Manila shall be suspended until April 14, 2020 (international departures will be permitted). Entry travel restrictions shall be imposed upon those traveling from countries with localized COVID-19 transmissions, except for Filipino citizens (including their foreign spouse and children) or holders of Permanent Resident Visas and Diplomat Visas. Mass transportation within Metro Manila shall continue to operate with social distancing guidelines.
- March 13 – Twelve new cases were confirmed on March 13, totaling 64 cases.
  - Bataan reported its first case, a 32-year-old-male resident of Orani and later confined at Bataan St. Joseph Hospital and Medical Center.
  - Batangas confirmed first case, a resident of Batangas City with travel history in London and later admitted at Batangas Medical Center.
  - Oriental Mindoro has been placed under a voluntary community quarantine through Executive Order No. 22 issued by Governor Humerlito Dolor, imposing a 12-day lockdown, starting at 12:01 p.m. on Saturday, March 14 until 11:59 p.m. on Wednesday, March 25.
  - Pampanga logged its first case, a 67-year-old-male resident of San Fernando and later admitted at Our Lady of Mt. Carmel Medical Center.
  - Parañaque City confirmed its first COVID-19 case, PH85 - a 38 male.
- March 14
  - Forty-seven new cases were confirmed on March 14, totaling 111 cases.
  - Abra and Cordillera Region confirmed its first COVID-19 case, a 39-year-old OFW seaman with travel history in the UAE and a resident of Catacdegan Nuevo, Manabo. The said OFW also became the first case in La Union upon learning that he visited his ailing mother at Lorma Medical Center in San Fernando, where he was earlier listed as person under investigation (PUI).
  - Pasay City confirmed its first COVID-19 case, PH86 - a 46-year-old male resident with known exposure to a carrier and later admitted at the Research Institute for Tropical Medicine.
- March 15
  - The National Capital Region and the municipality of Cainta in Rizal have been placed under "community quarantine" or a partial lockdown that will last until April 14.
  - Twenty-nine new cases have been confirmed on March 15, totaling 140 cases.
    - Antipolo confirmed its first case, a 60-year-old-male Filipino resident with travel history in Japan and later confined at Fatima University Medical Center, Antipolo.
    - Laguna logged its first case, a resident of Santa Rosa
    - Muntinlupa City confirmed its first COVID-19 case, (PH139) - a 44-year-old female resident with no recent travel history and monitored at the Research Institute for Tropical Medicine
    - Quezon province confirmed its first case, a 35-year-old male resident of Lucena with travel history in Thailand and Singapore.
    - Confirmed first case in Davao Region, a 21-year-old Filipina resident of Pantukan with travel history in the UK and Qatar and later admitted at Davao Regional Medical Center in Tagum, propelling cities of Davao and Tagum to declare a "partial lockdown". This is also the first reported COVID-19 case for Davao City, Davao de Oro and Davao del Norte.
  - The PNP announced that an officer assigned to the CIDG showed symptoms of COVID-19 while having a diabetic condition. He died on March 14 with the test results released by March 17.
- March 16
  - Two new cases have been confirmed on March 16, totaling 142 cases.
  - President Duterte announces the placement of the entire island of Luzon including its associated islands on "enhanced community quarantine," in effect imposing a lockdown on the island.
- March 17
  - The Department of Health confirmed that the occurrence of community-based transmission of the coronavirus in the Philippines.
  - Forty-five new cases were confirmed on March 17, totaling 187 cases.
  - A Diamond Princess repatriate who tested positive of the virus has completely recovered from the disease and was discharged within the same day. This brings a total of 4 recoveries among infected patients in the Philippines.
  - On March 17, President Rodrigo Duterte has signed Proclamation No. 929 that placed the entire Philippines under the state of calamity on account of COVID-19.
- March 18
  - Six new cases were confirmed on March 18, totaling 193 cases.
    - Cebu confirmed first case, a 65-year-old man resident of Mandaue, later confined at Chong Hua Hospital-Mandaue.
    - Cotabato City and Soccsksargen Region confirmed its first COVID-19 case, a 32-year-old Islamic missionary resident of Lanao del Sur who recently attended a tabligh gathering in Kuala Lumpur from February 27 to March 1. He was later confined at the Cotabato Regional and Medical Center.
  - The total confirmed cases of COVID-19 surpassed the 200-benchmark. Eleven new cases were later confirmed, totaling 202 cases. Three fatalities were confirmed totaling 17 deaths.

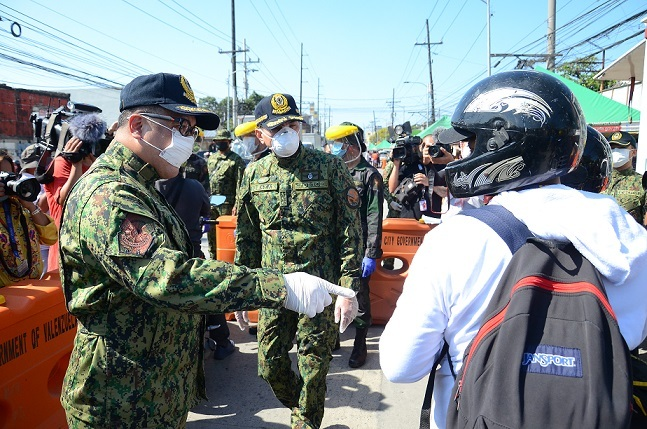
Police checkpoint near the border of Valenzuela, Metro Manila with Meycauayan, Bulacan. March 19

- March 19
  - Fifteen new cases were confirmed on March 19, totaling 217 cases.
    - Valenzuela City confirmed its first COVID-19 case, a 34-year-old female resident with no travel history but was exposed to a known carrier who travelled from Malaysia.
  - DOH Secretary Francisco Duque was placed under home quarantine after one of the department's senior officials tested positive for the disease.
  - DFA Secretary Teodoro Locsin Jr. announced the temporary suspension of visa issuance to all foreign individuals and cancellation of existing ones.
- March 20
  - President Duterte addressed the nation through the House of Representatives and gave additional orders to the people and the government to alleviate the spread of COVID-19.
  - Thirteen additional cases of the disease were confirmed, totaling 230 cases. One fatality was also confirmed, totaling 18 deaths.
    - Bacolod, Negros Occidental, and Western Visayas confirmed their first COVID-19 case, a 56-year-old man with travel history in London which arrived home on February 29, but later confined in an unspecified private hospital on March 6 upon experiencing symptoms.
    - Pangasinan logged its first COVID-19 case, a resident of an undisclosed location in the province.
    - Caba, La Union mayor Philip Crispino and his wife tested positive with COVID-19, they were home-quarantined.
- March 21
  - Thirty-two new cases were initially confirmed on March 21, totaling 262 cases. One fatality and five recoveries were also confirmed totaling 19 deaths and 13 recoveries.
  - Forty-five additional new cases were confirmed later, surpassing the 300-mark with 307 cases as total.
    - Cagayan Valley Region and Cagayan province confirmed its first COVID-19 case, a 44-year-old male senior fire officer of Santa Mesa Fire Station in Manila and resident of Tuguegarao who arrived in the province and later admitted at Cagayan Valley Medical Center. It is also the first COVID-19 case in Cagayan Valley region.
    - Iloilo confirmed its first COVID-19 case, a 65-year-old male patient resident of Guimbal town with no recent travel history but was exposed to a relative returned from Japan. He experienced symptoms on March 6 and later admitted to a hospital in Iloilo City on March 13.
    - Palawan and Mimaropa Region reported its first COVID-19 case, a 26-year-old male Australian national who travelled from Kuala Lumpur to Manila and arrived in Puerto Princesa City on March 5. He was admitted at a government hospital in the city after experiencing mild symptoms on March 12, discharged on March 15, and later allowed to travel back to Australia on March 17 despite pending confirmatory results.
- March 22
  - Seventy-three new cases were confirmed on March 22, totaling 380 cases. Six deaths and two recoveries were also confirmed totaling 25 deaths and 15 recoveries.
    - Nueva Ecija confirmed its first 2 COVID-19 cases in a 43-year-old medical representative from Cabanatuan and a 45-year-old resident of San Isidro.
  - According to DOH Undersecretary Maria Rosario Vergeire announced that DOH Secretary Francisco Duque tested negative for COVID-19, but decided to continue his home quarantine.
  - Malacañang asked Congress, on March 22, to declare a national emergency and grant the president emergency powers on account of COVID-19.

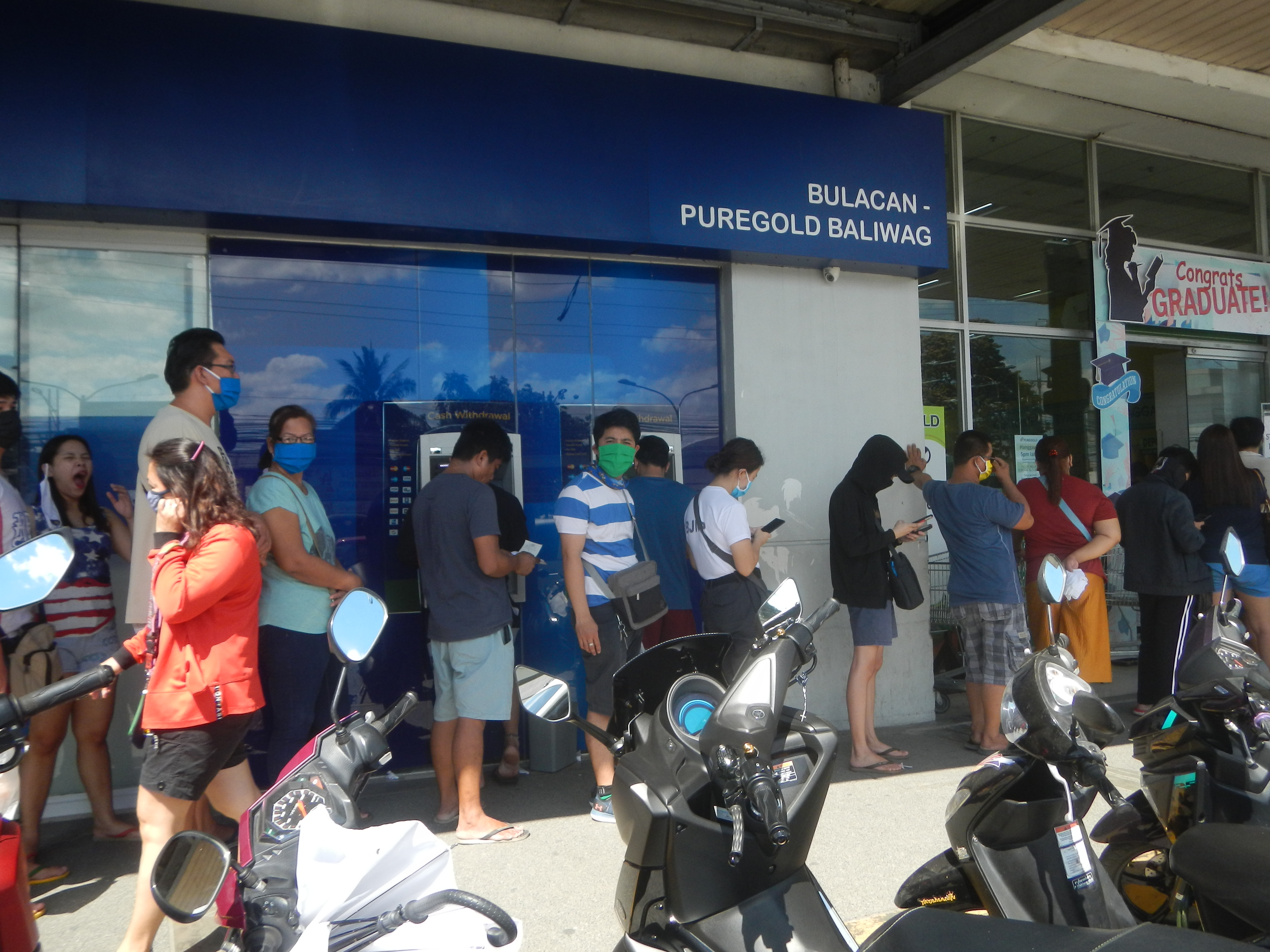
Panic buying in Baliuag, Bulacan, March 23, 2020

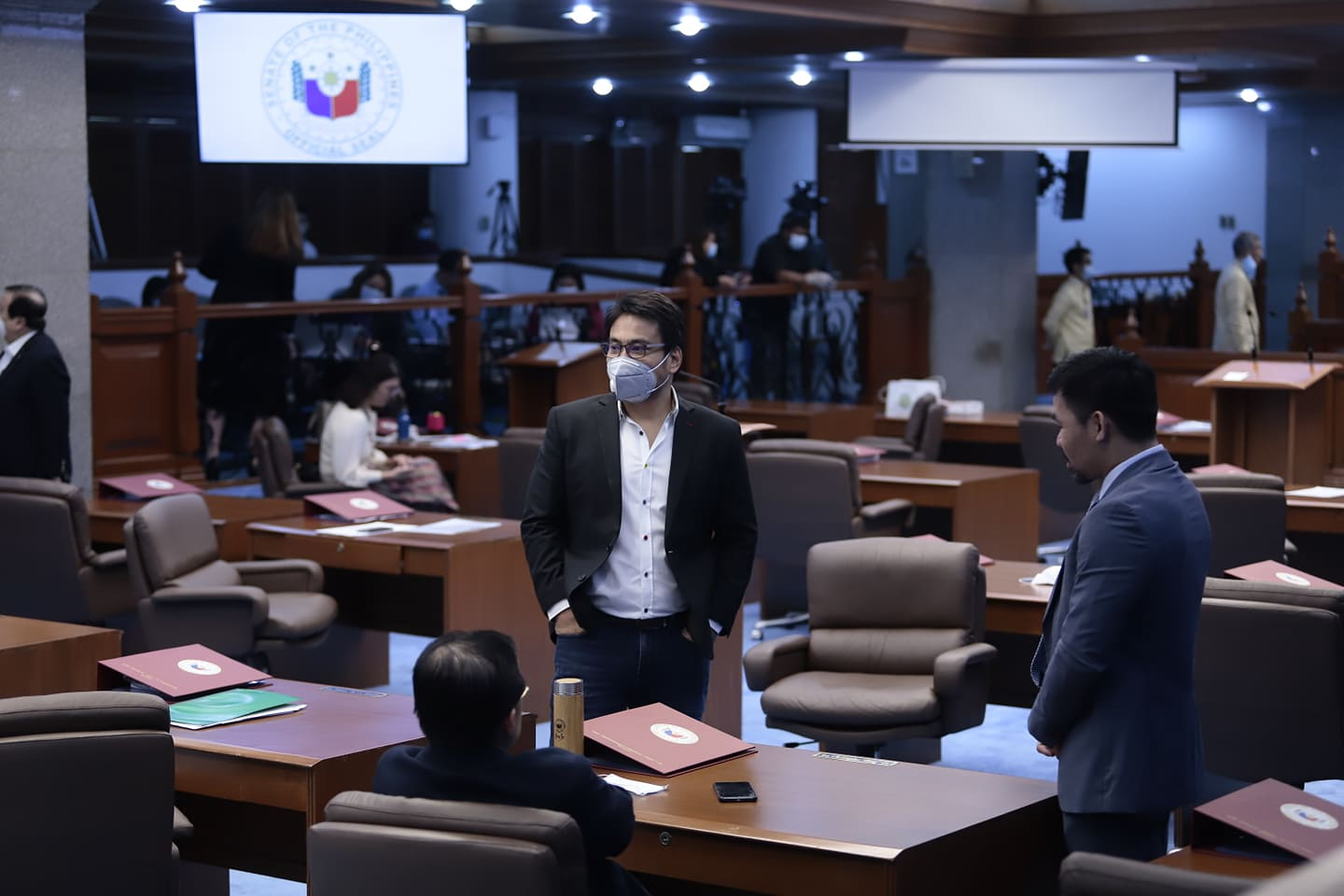
Senators during a special session to tackle the passage of the Bayanihan to Heal as One Act, March 23, 2020

- March 23
  - Sixteen new cases were confirmed on March 23, totaling 396 cases. Eight deaths and three recoveries were also confirmed totaling 33 deaths and 18 recoveries.
  - Sixty-six additional new cases were later confirmed on March 23, surpassing the 400-mark and totaling 462 cases.
    - Baguio confirmed its first COVID-19 case, a 61-year-old woman OFW in Italy who arrived in the country and later admitted at Baguio General Hospital.
    - Davao City confirmed 2 new cases, both 47-year-old male and female residents of the city with travel history in Metro Manila. They were both asymptomatic and home-quarantined.
    - Malabon confirmed its first COVID-19 case, a resident of barangay Dampalit.
    - Marinduque logged its first COVID-19 case, a resident of Torrijos who arrived in the province from Manila on March 12 and later confined at Marinduque Provincial Hospital upon experiencing symptoms.
    - Northern Samar and Eastern Visayas confirmed its first case of COVID-19, a 51-year old Filipino female resident of Catarman who arrived in Manila from Japan on January 2, Samar on March 3, and later admitted at an intensive care unit on March 12.
  - The Senate and the House of Representatives had a special session, on March 23, to deliberate President Duterte's request to realign funds for COVID-19 response.
  - The House of Representatives approved HB 6616 or "Bayanihan Act" on March 23, with 284-9-0 votes. This will empower President Duterte to handle COVID-19.
  - President Duterte signs Administrative Order No. 26, which grants a maximum of ₱500 daily hazard pay for government personnel who still report for work regardless of employment status during the month-long lockdown of Luzon to control the spread of the new coronavirus disease (COVID-19).
- March 24
  - With 12-0-0 votes (and 7-1-0 from non-attending senators), the Senate approved Senate Bill 1481 or "We Heal As One" that will grant President Duterte additional powers to handle COVID-19.
  - Combining both versions of the Upper and the Lower Houses, the bill was named "Bayanihan to Heal as One Act". The bill was then sent to President Duterte for approval.
  - Thirty-nine new cases were confirmed on March 24, surpassing the 500-mark and totaling 501 cases. They also confirmed the recovery of one patient, bringing the total number of recovered patients to 19.
  - Fifty-one additional new cases were later confirmed on March 24, totaling 552 cases. They also confirmed two new deaths and two new recoveries of patients, bringing the death toll to 35 and recovered patients to 20.
    - Capiz logged its first COVID-19 case, a 45-year-old male resident of Jamindan with recent travel history in Metro Manila.
    - Zamboanga City and Zamboanga Peninsula Region confirmed its first COVID-19 case, a 29-year-old male resident of barangay Sinunoc, Ayala District with recent travel history in Metro Manial and arrived on March 13. He consulted a local private hospital on March 15 upon experiencing symptoms, later considered him as a PUI.
  - President Duterte had a short live address on March 24. The president commended the front-liners, the fallen doctors and the Congress and assured the public that the government will do its best to alleviate the impact of COVID-19 using the powers bestowed upon him.
  - The first case of COVID-19 in Zamboanga was confirmed on March 24.
- March 25
  - On March 25, President Duterte signed the "Bayanihan to Heal as One Act of 2020" into law, granting him 30 additional powers to handle COVID-19 and its projected aftermath.
  - Eighty-four new cases were confirmed on March 25, surpassing the 600-mark and totaling 636 cases. They also confirmed six new recoveries and three new deaths, bringing the death toll to 38 and recovered patients to 26.
    - Sultan Kudarat confirmed its first COVID-19 case, a 68-year-old female with recent travel history in Manila.
- March 26
  - Seventy-one new cases were confirmed on March 26, surpassing the 700-mark and totaling 707 cases. They also confirmed two new recoveries and seven new deaths, bringing the death toll to 45 and recovered patients to 28.
    - Nueva Vizcaya reported its first COVID-19 case, a 65-year-old resident of Solano who unfortunately deceased last March 19, 2020.
    - Tarlac confirmed first two COVID-19 cases, a 75-year-old woman from Patalan, Paniqui and a 39-year-old man from Pinasling, Gerona.
    - Zambales logged its first COVID-19 case, a 73-year-old retired personnel from the United States Navy and later admitted at President Ramon Magsaysay Provincial Hospital in Iba.
- March 27
  - Ninety-six new cases were confirmed on March 27, surpassing the 800-mark and totaling 803 cases. They also confirmed three new recoveries and nine new deaths, bringing the death toll to 54 and recovered patients to 31.
    - Albay and Bicol Region confirmed its first two COVID-19 cases, a 50 and a 53 years old both male and admitted at Bicol Regional Training Hospital in Daraga.
    - Davao Oriental confirmed its first COVID-19 cases with 2 in a single day- both residents of Mati City, arrived in the province on March 7 from Manila on board a PAL flight via Davao City. They were home quarantined upon their arrival.
    - Camarines Sur logged its first COVID-19 case in, a 48-year-old female resident in Naga City.
    - Isabela confirmed its first COVID-19 case, a 23-year-old patient who traveled from Manila but later confined at the Southern Isabela Medical Center (SIMC) in Santiago City.
    - Occidental Mindoro reported its first COVID-19 case, an 84-year-old man, resident of Sablayan and unfortunately died at San Jose District Hospital on March 22.
    - Oriental Mindoro confirmed its first COVID-19 case, a 1-year-old girl resident of Ilaya, Calapan with travel history in Alabang from March 5–12. She is also the youngest known positive case in the country.
- March 28
  - Two hundred seventy-two new cases on March 28 was confirmed, the number leaped both the 900 and 1000th mark, bringing the COVID-19 cases in the Philippines to 1,075. Fourteen new deaths and four new recoveries were also confirmed, bringing the death toll to 68 and recovered patients to 35.
    - Aklan and Romblon logged its first COVID-19 case, a 60-year old German national from San Jose, Hambil Island with travel history in Manila. He was initially brought to San Jose District Hospital on March 22 and later transferred to Dr. Rafael S. Tumbokon Memorial Hospital (DRSTMH) in Kalibo, Aklan on March 25.
    - Benguet got its first two COVID-19 cases, a 34-year-old female OFW resident of Bokod town who arrived from Hong Kong on March 19; and a 6-year-old girl resident of Puguis, La Trinidad, who recently attended a burial in Cavite.
    - Davao Oriental confirmed it first 2 COVID-19 cases, two patients arrived in Mati City via Davao City from Manila on March 7 and later admitted at Davao Regional Medical Center.
    - Navotas confirmed its first COVID-19 case, a patient who died in an undisclosed hospital on March 24.
    - Olongapo City confirmed its first COVID-19 case, a 75-year old Filipino male with recent travel history in Manila.
- March 29
  - Three hundred forty-three new cases on March 29 was confirmed, bringing the COVID-19 cases in the country to 1,418. Three new deaths and seven new patients recovered, bringing the death toll to 71 and recovered patients to 42.
    - Ilocos Sur confirmed its first COVID-19 case, a 55-year-old woman resident of Magsaysay, Tagudin with no travel history but has a son who just came back from South Korea.
    - Misamis Occidental confirmed its first COVID-19 case, a 45-year-old seaman who travelled in Thailand and arrived in the province on March 14. He experienced symptoms on March 21 and brought to a hospital on March 24 at Mayor Hilarion A. Ramiro Sr. Medical Center (MHARS-MC).
- March 30
  - President Rodrigo Duterte has announced that his administration is allotting ₱200 billion to help low-income households affected by the implementation of the enhanced community quarantine to prevent the spread of the coronavirus disease 2019 (COVID-19).
  - One hundred twenty-eight new cases on March 30 was confirmed, bringing the COVID-19 cases in the country to 1,546. Seven new deaths and no new recovered patients, bringing the death to 78 and recovered patients to 42.
    - Davao del Sur confirmed its first COVID-19 case, a 38-year-old male residen of Digos who recently attended the cockfighting derby in Davao City and later admitted at the Southern Philippines Medical Center.
    - Ilocos Sur confirmed its first COVID-19 case, a 55-year-old woman resident of Magsaysay, Tagudin with no travel history but has a son who just came back from South Korea.
    - Lanao Norte confirmed its first COVID-19 case, a 67-year-old man resident of barangay Malingao, Tubod town, who had been at a recent cockfighting derby in Davao City and later admitted at the Northern Mindanao Medical Center on March 26 upon experiencing symptoms.
    - Zamboanga del Sur confirmed its first COVID-19 cases, both arrived in the province on board PAL Manila-Ozamiz flight PR289 on March 14.
- March 31
  - Five hundred thirty-eight new cases on March 30 was confirmed, the number leaped the 2000th mark, bringing the COVID-19 cases in the Philippines to 2,084. The death toll is at 88 and recovered patients at 49.
    - Dagupan confirmed its first COVID-19 cases with 4 positive patients in a single day - 2 were home-quarantined in barangay Poco Chico while 2 others were admitted at Region I Medical Center.
    - Ilocos Norte logged its first 2 COVID-19 cases, a 42-year-old male resident of Sungadan, Paoay with no travel history and a 49-year-old male resident of Magnuang, Batac with travel history in Metro Manila.
    - Samar logged its first COVID-19 case, a 63-year-old male resident of Calbayog with recent travel history in Metro Manila who arrived in the province on March 8. He was admitted in a local hospital on March 21 and 25 and later transferred at Eastern Visayas Regional Medical Center on March 31 due to “high-risk health conditions".
    - South Cotabato confirmed its first COVID-19 case, a patient resident of T'Boli town with recent travel history in Metro Manila, arrived in the province on March 16, and later admitted at the South Cotabato Provincial Hospital on March 18.

=== April ===
- April 1
  - At least 20 protesters demanding food aid were arrested by Quezon City police in barangay Bagong Pag-asa, allegedly initiating a rally without a permit.
  - President Duterte ordered soldiers to protect themselves from violent unruly protesters and quarantine violators.
- April 2 – The Philippine ambassador to Lebanon, Bernardita Catalla, died of COVID-19 in Beirut at the age of 62. She was the first Filipino diplomat to succumb to the disease.
- April 3 – Three hundred eight-five new cases were confirmed, thereby surpassing the 3,000th mark, bringing the COVID-19 cases in the Philippines to 3,018. Also recorded were twenty-nine new deaths and one new recovery, bringing the death toll to 136 and recovered patients to 52.
- April 4 - Camiguin logged its first COVID-19 case, a 32-year-old female resident of Mahinog town with recent travel history in Manila where she got the virus. She completed the prescribed 14-day quarantine period on March 28. But her samples were thrice ending with a confirmed result.
- April 5 – President Duterte signs Administrative Order No. 28, which giving of a one-time special risk allowance to government health workers.
- April 6
  - Caraga Region and Butuan confirmed its first COVID-19 case, a 68-year-old male resident with travel history in Manila and later admitted in at the Caraga Regional Hospital upon experiencing symptoms on March 25. Caraga is the last region in the country to be reached by COVID-19.
  - Cotabato (North) confirmed its first COVID-19 case, a 46-year-old male who recently attended the infamous cockfighting event in Davao City from March 6–13. He was later confined at North Cotabato isolation facility in barangay Amas, Kidapawan City.
  - Maguindanao confirmed its first COVID-19 case, a 54-year-old male resident of Datu Odin Sinsuat town who also attended the infamous cockfighting event in Davao City from March 6–13.
  - It was announced that President Duterte was making consideration on extending the quarantine.
- April 7
  - Antique confirmed its first COVID-19 case, a 74-year-old man who arrived in barangay Semirara, Semirara Island, Caluya town on board a private plane from Parañaque City on March 9. He later sought consultation at the Semirara Mining Power Consultation Hospital upon experiencing difficulty breathing and fever on March 19.
  - General Santos confirmed its first COVID-19 case, a 59-year-old businessman who recent attended the infamous Araw ng Davao cockfight derby at the New Davao Matina Gallera in Davao City from March 6 to 13.
  - DOH reported at least 11 out of 12 COVID-19 deaths in Region XI - Davao Region were linked with the Araw ng Davao cockfight derby at the Matina Gallera in Davao City held last month from March 6 to 13.
- April 9
  - Bukidnon confirmed its first COVID-19 case, a resident of barangay Lumbayao, Valencia City who was considered as PUI after attending the infamous Araw ng Davao cockfight derby at the Matina Gallera in Davao City held last month from March 6 to 13.
  - Two hundred six new cases were confirmed, bringing the COVID-19 cases in the country to 4,076. Twenty-one new deaths and twenty-eight new recoveries were recorded, bringing the death toll to 203 and recovered patients to 124.
  - Education secretary Leonor Briones tested positive with COVID-19, became the 2nd cabinet member contacted with the disease.
- April 12 – The Philippine government now requires public disclosure of personal information of COVID-19 patients to further contain the spread of the virus.
- April 14
  - Two hundred ninety-one new cases were confirmed on April 14, bringing the COVID-19 cases in the country to 5,223. Twenty new deaths and fifty-three new recoveries were recorded, bringing the death toll to 335 and recovered patients to 295.
  - President Rodrigo Duterte has approved the Small Business Relief Program to help some 1.6 million small businesses and their 3.4 million employees affected by the implementation of the enhanced community quarantine in Luzon and other areas of the country.
- April 17 - Leyte confirmed its first COVID-19 case, a 58-year-old female resident of Burauen town, with travel history in Guam in February and Manila on March 9, arriving in the province on March 13. She was eventually admitted at Eastern Visayas Regional Medical Center on March 23.
- April 18 – Two hundred nine new cases were confirmed on April 18, bringing the COVID-19 cases in the country to 6,087. Ten new deaths and twenty-nine new recoveries were recorded, bringing the death toll to 397 and recovered patients to 516.
- April 19 - Catanduanes confirmed its first case of COVID-19, a 63-year-old woman resident of Virac town with travel history in Japan and later admitted at Eastern Bicol Medical Center after experiencing symptoms.
- April 24
  - During a press conference that was held at 8 am, Duterte announced another extension for the enhanced community quarantine until May 15, 2020, but only for selected provinces that are considered as high-risk areas. Other provinces will be placed under general community quarantine effective May 1, 2020.
  - Two hundred eleven new cases were confirmed on April 24, bringing the COVID-19 cases in the country to 7,172. Fifteen new deaths and forty new recoveries were recorded, bringing the death toll to 477 and recovered patients to 762.
- April 25 - Ifugao logged its first COVID-19 case, a 65-year-old patient resident of Poblacion East, Lamut and later admitted at Region-2 Trauma and Medical Center in Bayombong, Nueva Vizcaya.
- April 29 – Two hundred fifty-four new cases were confirmed on April 29, bringing the COVID-19 cases in the country to 8,212. Twenty-eight new deaths and forty-eight new recoveries were recorded, bringing the death toll to 558 and recovered patients to 1,023.
- April 30
  - The Supreme Court has allowed reduced bail and release on own recognizance as modes of release for indigent detainees during pandemic.
  - President Duterte issued Executive Order No. 112, s. 2020 – placing ECQ in NCR, Central Luzon (except Aurora), Calabarzon, Benguet, Pangasinan, Iloilo, Cebu, Bacolod, and Davao City; and GCQ for the rest of the country May 1–15, 2020.

=== May ===
- May 1
  - Sulu confirmed its first COVID-19 case, a 63-year-old male resident of Indanan town with no travel history but died on April 19 at Sulu Sanitarium Hospital following a respiratory failure.
  - The enhanced community quarantine has been replaced with the general community quarantine in certain areas with lower risk of community transmission. Meanwhile, high-risk areas such as Metro Manila, Calabarzon, Central Luzon (except Aurora), and several other provinces are still under the enhanced community quarantine.
- May 3 – Two hundred ninety-five new cases were confirmed on May 3, bringing the COVID-19 cases in the country to 9,223. Four new deaths and ninety new recoveries were recorded, bringing the death toll to 607 and recovered patients to 1,214.
- May 4 - Zamboanga del Norte confirmed its first COVID-19 case, a 63-year-old Norwegian male national which arrived in Dipolog on March 2. He admitted in a private hospital on April 26 but later airlifted to Manila on May 2.
- May 5 - Davao Occidental confirmed its first COVID-19 case, a 65-year-old woman resident with no travel history outside the province except when she was admitted at Southern Philippines Medical Center following he stroke.
- May 6
  - The country breached the 10,000-mark in its tally COVID-19 cases with 320 fresh cases recorded, bringing the total to 10,004.
  - Twenty-one new deaths and ninety-eight new recoveries were recorded, bringing the death toll to 658 and recovered patients to 1,506.
  - President Duterte signed Executive Order No. 114, s. 2020, institutionalizing and creating a council for Balik Probinsya, Bagong Pag-asa Program as a framework for balanced regional development and as an aid to decongest cases in the NCR.
- May 11 - Camarines Norte confirmed first case of COVID-19, a 45-year-old male resident of Labo town.
- May 14
  - The government has lifts restrictions on Filipino departures for overseas employment.
  - Sorsogon logged its first COVID-19 case, a 37-year-old male seafarer who arrived from Miami, Florida. He was previously quarantined in Matnog but later admitted at Sorsogon Provincial Hospital.
- May 15- Surigao del Norte confirmed its first COVID-19 case, a 37-year-old female health worker at the Caraga Regional Hospital in Surigao City.
- May 16 – The IATF-EID issued Resolution No. 37, overriding prior plans, placing Metro Manila, the cities of Angeles and Bacoor, and the provinces of Laguna, Bataan, Bulacan, Nueva Ecija, Pampanga, and Zambales under modified enhanced community quarantine (MECQ), which is more lenient than an ECQ but stricter than a GCQ. Cebu City and Mandaue City were placed under ECQ while the rest of the country was placed under GCQ.
- May 18 - Sarangani confirmed its first COVID-19 case, 70-year-old male resident of Maitum town with no recent travel history but admitted at the Sarangani Medical Center last May 5 upon experiencing symptoms.
- May 26 – In a meeting of the Metro Manila Council, all mayors of Metro Manila cities have agreed that the National Capital Region will be placed from MECQ to GCQ effective June 1. The local government units may still place certain barangays or villages under lockdown if they see it fit to do so. They have submitted their recommendation to the IATF-EID and will wait for their final decision. If the IATF-EID does agree, public transportation will still have to be limited.
- May 27 - Basilan confirmed its first COVID-19 case, a 47-year-old resident of Tipo-Tipo town and later admitted at the Zamboanga City General Hospital.
- May 31
  - Agusan del Sur confirmed its first COVID-19 case, a 37-year-old LSI male who arrived in the province on May 26.
  - The Enhanced community quarantine in Luzon ends, as most localities downgrade to either general community quarantine or modified general community quarantine.

=== June ===
- June 1
  - Apayao confirmed its first COVID-19 case, a 28-year old health worker resident of Conner with no travel history outside of the province.
  - President Duterte downgraded NCR to GCQ together with Davao City, Cagayan Valley, Central Luzon, Calabarzon, Pangasinan, and Albay from June 1–30, 2020.
  - CAB ordered to cancel scheduled domestic flights including the sale of tickets as IATF-EID is yet to approve proposed flight routes.
  - Cavite lifted liquor ban while reiterating that consumption will only be allowed inside individual homes as announced by Governor Jonvic Remulla.
- June 3
  - Biliran reported its first COVID-19 case, a 19-year student resident of Naval who travelled from Baguio to Manila on May 9 and quarantined for 14 days, and later arrived in the province on May 27.
  - Tacloban City confirmed its first COVID-19 case, a 29-year-old-female returning overseas Filipino seafarer resident of the city who arrived on June 1, 2020, from Italy and Manila after being admitted at Capas, Tarlac Isolation Facility on May 7. She was later isolated at Tacloban Ligtas COVID-19 Temporary Treatment Monitoring Facility (UNDP Evacuation Center) in barangay Bagacay.
- June 5 - Ormoc City logged its first COVID-19 case, a 49-year-old OFW from Saudi Arabia and arrived in the Tacloban City through Balik Probinsya program.on May 27.
- June 10 - Kalinga recorded its first COVID-19 case, a 30-year-old displaced construction worker resident of Gobgob, Tabuk, who arrived from Caloocan on June 6.
- June 11 - Southern Leyte confirmed its first case, a 23-year-old male seafarer resident of Bontoc town who arrived on May 31 and later admitted at Eastern Visayas Regional Medical Center.
- June 12 - Misamis Oriental reported its first COVID-19 case, a 29-year-old male resident of Libertad town who arrived on June 6 and later admitted at the Northern Mindanao Medical Center.
- June 13 - Eastern Samar confirmed its first COVID-19 case, a 30-year-old male resident of Mercedes town and later admitted at Eastern Visayas Medical Center.
- June 16 - Mountain Province logged its first COVID-19 case, a resident of Suquib, Besao town who had contact with a positive case on June 6.
- June 20 - Surigao del Sur confirmed its first COVID-19 cases with 3 in a single day, - 2 from Bislig and 1 in Lingig town.
- June 24 - Zamboanga Sibugay confirmed its first COVID-19 case, a worker who arrived from Cebu City.
- June 28
  - WHO data reported that the Philippines has fastest COVID-19 cases rise in Western Pacific region.
  - Masbate confirmed its first two COVID-19 cases, a 23-year-old man who arrived in Bicol from Caloocan and a 25-year-old man who arrived from Taguig City.
- June 29
  - Isabela City de Basilan confirmed its first COVID-19 case, a 25-year-old LSI woman who arrived in the city from Manila on June 18 and immediately quarantined in an isolation facility.
  - Cebu City became the new epicenter of the COVID-19 in the country with 4,562 cases surpassing Quezon City with 3,161 and Manila with 2,290 cases
- June 30 – St. Paul's Hospital in Iloilo City went on locked down after six doctors tested positive for the disease

=== July ===
- July 1 – Ninety-two MRT Line 3 workers tested positive for COVID-19.
- July 3 – One hundred twenty-seven MRT Line 3 workers tested positive for COVID-19.
- July 5
  - Tawi-tawi confirmed its first COVID-19 case, a 44-year old police officer LSI resident of Bongao with travel history in San Isidro, Quezon City. The officer travelled to Zamboanga City to Basilan before arriving in the province on June 30.
  - One hundred seventy-two MRT Line 3 workers tested positive for COVID-19, including 6 station personnel and 166 depot workers.
- July 6
  - Two thousand ninety-nine new cases were confirmed on July 6, bringing the COVID-19 cases in the country to 46,333. One-thousand two hundred fifty-eight are "fresh cases" or were detected in the last three days. Eight hundred forty-one are "late cases" or were part of the validation backlog. Six new deaths and two hundred forty-three new recoveries were recorded, bringing the death toll to 1,303 and recovered patients to 12,185.
  - At least one hundred and eighty-six MRT Line 3 workers tested positive for COVID-19, including 17 station personnel and 169 depot workers.
- July 7 – MRT Line 3 temporarily ceases operations due to a spike in COVID-19 cases among the train personnel for 5 days, until July 11.
- July 8
  - Quezon City Mayor Joy Belmonte tests positive for COVID-19.
  - Philippines breached the 50,000-mark of COVID-19 cases recorded with thousand five hundred thirty-nine new cases were confirmed, bringing the COVID-19 cases in the country to 50,359. One thousand nine hundred twenty-two are "fresh cases" in the last three days. Six hundred seventeen are "late cases" or were part of the validation backlog. Five new deaths and two hundred two new recoveries were recorded, bringing the death toll to 1,314 and recovered patients to 12,588.
- July 11 – One thousand three hundred eighty-seven new cases were confirmed, bringing the COVID-19 cases in the country to 54,222. Nine hundred eighteen are "fresh cases" in the last three days. Four hundred sixty-nine are "late cases" or were part of the validation backlog. Twelve new deaths and eight hundred seven new recoveries were recorded, bringing the death toll to 1,372 and recovered patients to 14,037.
- July 13 – MRT Line 3 resumes operations on limited capacity.
- July 14 – Several Metro Manila hospitals reached full capacity, making the region classified under "danger zone" in terms of bed capacity. Four regions, namely Central Visayas, Calabarzon, Davao Region, and Central Luzon are classified under "warning zone".
- July 15 – Department of Public Works and Highways Secretary Mark Villar tests positive for COVID-19.
- July 16
  - Cebu City shifts to MECQ. Metro Manila remains under GCQ for another two weeks. Provinces and cities under GCQ include: Laguna, Cavite, Rizal, Mandaue City, Lapu-Lapu City, Ormoc City, Southern Leyte, Zamboanga City, Butuan, Agusan del Norte, Basilan, and Talisay, Minglanilla, and Concepcion in Cebu Province. The rest of the country shifts to MGCQ.
  - Navotas undergoes lockdown until July 29.
- July 17 – Quezon City Mayor Joy Belmonte tests negative for COVID-19.
- July 20 – Actor and comedian Michael V. tests positive for COVID-19.
- July 21
  - One thousand nine hundred fifty-one new cases were confirmed, bringing the COVID-19 cases in the country to 70,764. Two new deaths and two hundred nine new recoveries were recorded, bringing the death toll to 1,837 and recovered patients to 23,281.
  - President Duterte allows limited face-to-face classes in MGCQ areas as proposed by Education Secretary Leonor Briones which is to be implemented by January 2021.
  - The Philippine government aims to have 10 million Filipinos, or 10 percent of the total current population, tested by 2021.
- July 23 – Free COVID-19 testing is launched at Vicente Sotto Memorial Medical Center, Cebu City. It is the first free testing outside of Metro Manila.
- July 24 – Two thousand one hundred three new cases were confirmed, bringing the COVID-19 cases in the country to 76,444. Six new deaths and fifteen new recoveries were recorded, bringing the death toll to 1,879 and recovered patients to 24,502.
- July 28 – One thousand six hundred seventy-eight new cases were confirmed, bringing the COVID-19 cases in the country to 83,673. Four new deaths and one hundred seventy-three new recoveries were recorded, bringing the death toll to 1,947 and recovered patients to 26,617.
- July 29
  - Guimaras confirmed its first COVID-19 case, a 22-year-old male resident of Buenavista town who went home on July 13, and returned to Iloilo City on the next day. He was later admitted at a private hospital in the city on July 24 upon experiencing symptoms.
  - Navotas lifts lockdown; 5,853 residents were arrested for violating health rules and city ordinances the day before.
- July 31 – Three thousand nine hundred fifty-four new cases were confirmed, bringing the COVID-19 cases in the country to 89,374. Twenty-three new deaths and 38,075 new recoveries were recorded (due to enhanced data reconciliation efforts with local government units through Oplan Recovery), bringing the death toll to 1,083 and recovered patients to 65,064.

=== August ===
- August 1 – Cebu City downgrades to GCQ. Metro Manila still remains under GCQ. Provinces, towns, and cities under GCQ include: Batangas, Bulacan, Cavite, Laguna, Rizal, Lapu-Lapu City, Mandaue, Talisay, Minglanilla, Consolacion, and Zamboanga City. The rest of the country are under MGCQ.
- August 2
  - The country breached 100,000-mark on the number of COVID-19 cases recorded with five thousand thirty-two new cases were confirmed, bringing the COVID-19 cases to 103,185. Twenty new deaths and three hundred one new recoveries were recorded, bringing the death toll to 2,059 and recovered patients to 65,557.
  - Siquijor confirms first two cases of COVID-19, breaking its 6-month absence. The two cases traveled from Metro Manila through the country's Balik Probinsya program, both were locally stranded individuals (LSI), residents of Lazi and Larena respectively.
  - Front liners and medical groups advocated a "timeout" to President Duterte to revert Metro Manila back on ECQ as COVID-19 cases surges.
  - President Duterte later made a decision to revert Metro Manila, Bulacan, Cavite, Laguna, and Rizal back on MECQ starting August 4 until August 18.
- August 6 – The country has the most total COVID-19 cases, surpassing Indonesia in terms of cases in Southeast Asia.
- August 9
  - Three thousand one hundred nine new cases were confirmed, bringing the COVID-19 cases in the country to 129,913. Sixty-one new deaths and six hundred fifty-four new recoveries were recorded, bringing the death toll to 2,270 and recovered patients to 67,673.
  - Senator Bong Revilla tests positive for COVID-19.
  - Sagada, Mountain Province confirmed its first case from a 29-year-old front liner who has no travel history.
- August 10 – Six thousand nine hundred fifty-eight nine new cases were confirmed, bringing the COVID-19 cases in the country to 136,638. Twenty-four new deaths and six hundred thirty-three new recoveries were recorded, bringing the death toll to 2,293 and recovered patients to 68,159. This is the highest number of daily cases ever recorded in the country since the start of the pandemic
- August 14
  - Aurora confirmed its first COVID-19 case, a woman in her 50s resident of Pasay City, who went to Baler and later admitted at Aurora Medical Hospital, also in Baler.
  - Quirino reported its first COVID-19 case, a 24-year-old resident of Mangandingay, Cabarroguis with no travel history.
- August 18 – President Duterte approved IATF-EID recommendation to place NCR, Bulacan, CALABARZON, Nueva Ecija, Iloilo City, Cebu City, Lapu-Lapu City, Mandaue City, Talisay City, Minglanilla and Consolacion under GCQ, while the rest of the country under MGCQ from August 19–31, 2020.
- August 22 - Dinagat Islands confirmed its first COVID-19 cases with 7 in a single day - 4 from Loreto, 2 from Cagdianao and 1 from San Jose.
- August 26 – COVID-19 cases in the country breached 200,000 mark, with 202,361 total confirmed cases after reporting 5,277 additional cases.
- August 31 – President Duterte set NCR, Bulacan, Batangas, Tacloban City, and Bacolod under GCQ and Iligan City under MECQ from September 1–30, 2020.

=== September ===
- September 26 – Cases in the country breached 300,000 mark, with 2,727 new COVID-19 cases bringing the total of 301,256 infected individuals.
- September 28
  - During a televised meeting with President Rodrigo Duterte, Health Secretary Francisco Duque III announced to keep the whole Metro Manila under General Community Quarantine (GCQ) together with Batangas, Tacloban City, Bacolod, Iligan City, and Iloilo City from October 1–31, 2020. Lanao del Sur including Marawi City set under modified general community quarantine (MGCQ) and rest of the country under modified general community quarantine (MGCQ)
  - Batanes recorded its first COVID-19 case when an LSI who arrived in the province on September 22 tested positive. Batanes became the last province in the country to be reached by the disease.
  - President Duterte approved the recommendation of the IATF-EID placing NCR, Batangas, Tacloban City, Bacolod, Iligan City, Iloilo City on GCQ and Lanao del Sur (including Marawi City) on MECQ from October 1–31, 2020.

=== October ===
- October 5 – Department of Education officially opened school year 2020–2021 in over 47,000 public schools in the country through blended learning. For the first time in Philippine education system history, school opened in the homes of 22.44 million public school students.
- October 11 – Philippine Basketball Association games resumed after 7-months break at the PBA Bubble, Clark Freeport Zone, Pampanga amid the pandemic.
- October 16 – Indonesia surpassed the Philippines in the number of confirmed cases and related deaths due to COVID-19, highest in Southeast Asia. Indonesia reported 365,200 cases and 12,600 deaths, meanwhile the Philippines had over 359,100 infected patients and 6,600 death record.
- October 30 – Malacañang announced that Metro Manila, Batangas, Iloilo City, Bacolod, Tacloban, Iligan City, and Lanao del Sur will be placed under GCQ for the month of November. Meanwhile, the rest of the country under MGCQ.

=== November ===
- November 3 – After 4 days of suspension, PBA games resumed, agreeing with recommendations by the IATF-EID. It was previously reported that a player and a game official tested positive with COVID-19.
- November 4 – President Duterte issued Executive Order No. 118, s. 2020, mandating DOH and DTI, to determine price ranges and to ensure accessibility and affordability of COVID-19 tests and test kits.
- November 11 – The country breached the 400,000 mark, with 1,672 new cases making the total of 401,416 confirmed cases.
- November 21 – Senate president Vicente Sotto III revealed senator Panfilo Lacson and Leyte congressman Martin Romualdez were the first high officials who had been inoculated with a COVID-19 vaccine
- November 24 – Bloomberg Survey placed Philippines at 43rd out of 53 countries in COVID-19 Resilience Ranking, dropped behind compare to Asian neighbors.
- November 26 – The Senate approved P4.5-T 2021 national budget which includes increased funding for COVID-19 vaccines, continued contact tracing operations, RITM, and budgets of regional public hospitals including bed capacity and equipment and facilities upgrade.
- November 30 – President Duterte announced GCQ on NCR, Batangas, Iloilo City, Tacloban City, Lanao del Sur, Iligan, Davao City, and Davao del Norte from December 1–31, 2020. The rest of the country will be under MGCQ.

=== December ===
- December 1 – President Duterte signed Executive Order No. 121, s. 2020, granting authority to FDA to issue emergency use authorization for COVID-19 drugs and vaccines.
- December 7 – Trade and Industry Secretary Ramon Lopez tested positive with COVID-19, became the 4th cabinet member contacted with virus after being exposed to a person with the disease. He is asymptomatic and his last known interaction with the President was on November 20, 2020 (19 days ago).
- December 8 – May Parsons, a Filipina nurse serving in the United Kingdom for 24 years, became the first in the world to administer a COVID-19 vaccine outside of clinical trials.
- December 9
  - A nurse and two other Filipinos in the UK were among the first who got inoculated against the disease using the Pfizer/BioNTech COVID vaccine.
  - Barangay Ginebra San Miguel won the 2020 PBA Philippine Cup at the PBA Bubble, the only approved venue by the IATF-EID for professional basketball games in the country. Ginebra bagged the championship trophy in 5 games against the undermanned Tropang Giga, 13 years after they got their last All Filipino crown in 2007.
- December 14
  - President Rodrigo Duterte approved Deped's proposal to have face-to-face classes in identified areas with lower COVID-19 risk by January 2021, according to Malacañan's spokesperson, Sec. Harry Roque.
  - BI and DOT supported the proposal of creating a global COVID-19 passport to allow international cross-border travel with stiffer health and safety measures.
- December 15 – IATF-EID placed Isabela (excluding the independent City of Santiago) in GCQ until December 31, 2020, upon the recommendation of Governor Rodolfo Albano III due to sudden spike of COVID-19 cases in the province.
- December 16 – Education secretary Leonor Briones recommended to conduct dry run for face-to-face classes in 1,114 schools nationwide within areas of low COVID-19 risk.
- December 17
  - World Bank approved $900-million loan for the country's COVID-19 recovery projects
  - A businessman confirmed that unauthorized COVID-19 vaccination activities are happening in few undisclosed locations in the country without any government approval.
  - DFA secretary Teodoro Locsin Jr. and Senator Panfilo Lacson blasted on the failure of the Health department to secure necessary documentary requirements including the Confidentiality Disclosure Agreement (CDA) that put the country's acquisition of 10-M doses of Pfizer vaccine in limbo. This was confirmed by Locsin after a meeting with Ambassador to the US Jose Manuel Romualdez, and US Secretary of State Mike Pompeo. Health secretary Francisco Duque III and the country's vaccine czar Carlito Galvez Jr. later denied all the allegations, saying that they hadn't dropped the ball and the negotiations for the vaccine was still ongoing.
- December 19 – After a conversation with US Secretary Mike Pompeo, DFA secretary Teodoro Locsin Jr. confirmed that the US counterpart will try to recover the country's bid for Pfizer vaccine, even a fraction of 10-M agreed number of units.
- December 20
  - NCR's Regional Peace and Order Council issued Resolution No. 19-2020, banning the use of all firecrackers in whole Metro Manila during the holiday season amid the pandemic.
  - Over 70 members of PNP-SAF were deployed in the City of Manila to implement health protocol amid the holiday season and with the pandemic. Mayor Isko Moreno clarified that the city won't implement a lockdown.
- December 21
  - Foreign Affairs secretary Teodoro Locsin Jr. revealed that the country is expected to receive 30 million doses of COVID-19 vaccine from Novavax as confirmed by Serum Institute of India, the world's largest vaccine producer.
  - House Bill No. 8280 was filed by Ang Probinsyano Party-list Representative Ronnie Ong that aims to provide vaccine passports for COVID-19 and other infectious diseases.
- December 23 – Malacañang suspended incoming flights from the UK from December 24–31, 2020, over the fear of the new and more infectious coronavirus variant, VOC-202012/01. Consequently, all inbound passengers who have been in the UK within 14 days prior to arrival in the country are also barred from entry; and travelers from the UK before the said dates are required to undergo quarantine. As of December 23, at least 40 countries have already issued travel restrictions to and from the UK
- December 26 – Malacañang revealed that Pfizer-BioNTech had applied for an emergency use authorization (EUA) for its vaccine, to allow its availability in the country. Meanwhile, President Duterte declared that the country will terminate VFA if US fails to deliver COVID-19 vaccines. President Duterte also applauded country's medical experts on their efforts to battle against the disease including its newly reported strain. Thus, Malacañang canceled its order that allows face-to-face classes in January 2021 over the threat of the new variant.
- December 27
  - President Duterte revealed that many already received the Sinopharm BIBP vaccine, including military men despite it has yet to get approval from FDA.
  - Presidential Spokesperson Harry Roque announced that travelers from countries with reported new SARS-CoV-2 variant from the UK will be required to undergo a mandatory 14-day quarantine upon arrival in the country as approved by the President.
  - The Philippines logged 883 new cases, the lowest total number of daily cases in 5 months since July 14, 2020, when the country reported 634 cases. This increased the total number of cases to 469,886, with 22,099 still active cases, 9,109 deaths, 438,678 recoveries, and recovery rate at 93.36%.
- December 28 – President Duterte announced new quarantine classifications from January 1–31, 2021 – places under GCQ are Metro Manila, Isabela, Santiago City, Batangas, Iloilo, Tacloban City, Lanao del Sur, Iligan City, Davao City, and Davao del Norte, while the rest of the country under MGCQ.
- December 29
  - FDA approved Johnson & Johnson's COVID-19 Janssen vaccine for clinical trial application.
  - The country expanded travel ban to 20 countries namely – Australia, Canada, Denmark, France, Germany, Hong Kong, Iceland, Ireland, Israel, Italy, Japan, Lebanon, Netherlands, Singapore, South Africa, South Korea, Spain, Sweden, Switzerland and United Kingdom amid the threat of Variant of Concern 202012/01
- December 30
  - PhilHealth announced that agency's premium rate is set increase in 2021 amid the pandemic to 3.50% of monthly basic salary from the present 3.00%. Individuals earning below P10,000 will have fixed rate of P350 per month while those earning P70,000 monthly or more is fixed at P2.450 per month. Based on the Republic Act No. 11223 or Universal health care (UHC) Law of 2018, the rate shall increase to increments of 0.5% annually, starting next year until will be peaked at 5% limit by 2025.
  - At least 100 Filipinos and foreigners who arrived in the country on December 29, 2020, clamored on the unsuitable condition of the quarantine facility provided to them in one of hotels in Lemery, Batangas as they reached the said facility on December 30, 2020.
- December 31 – At the end of the year, the country recorded 1,541 new cases, 296 new recoveries, and 14 deaths, bringing total cases to 474,064 (25,024 or 5.28% as active cases), survivor count to 439,796 (92.77%), and death toll at 9,244 (1.95%) respectively, lower than estimated data by OCTA Research Group.

== See also ==
- 2020 in the Philippines
- COVID-19 vaccination in the Philippines
- Philippine government response to the COVID-19 pandemic
