= List of hospitals in Yerevan =

This is a list of hospitals in Yerevan, the capital of Armenia. As of 2022, there are 46 hospitals operating in the city.

- Beglaryan Medical Centre, 1920
- Scientific Research Institute of Spa Treatment and Physical Medicine, 1930
- Research Center of Maternal and Child Health Protection, 1931
- Shengavit Medical Center, 1938
- Heratsi Hospital Complex №1, 1940
- Scientific Center of Traumatology and Orthopedics, 1946
- National Center of Oncology named after V.A. Fanarjian, 1946
- Professor R. Yeolyan Haematology Center, 1947
- Nork Republican Infectious Clinical Hospital, 1956
- Kanaker-Zeytun Maternity Hospital, 1958
- Scientific Research Institute of Cardiology, 1961
- Grigor Narekatsi Medical Center, 1962
- Astghik Medical Center, 1965
- Armenia Republican Medical Center, 1969
- Scientific Medical Center of Dermatology and STD, 1969
- Avan Mental Health Center, 1971
- Aramyants Medical Center, 1972
- Mickaelyan Institute of Surgery, 1974
- ArtMed Medical Rehabilitation Center, 1976
- Sergey Malayan's Eye Center, 1978
- Sourb Astvatsamayr Medical Center, 1982
- Erebouni Medical Center, 1983
- Izmirlian Medical Center, 1986
- Yerevan Anti-tuberculosis Dispensary, 1987
- Saint Astvatsatsin Maternity Hospital, 1992
- Republican Pediatric Rehabilitation Center, 1992
- Cross Health Center, 1992
- Republican Institute of Reproductive Health, Perinatology, Obstetrics and Gynaelogy, 1993
- Nork-Marash Medical Center, 1994
- Arabkir Joint Medical Center and Institute of Child and Adolescent Health, 1995
- ArBeS Healthcare Center for Rehabilitation, 1999
- Armenicum Clinical Center, 1999
- Yerevan Endocrinological Dispensary, 1999
- Kanaker-Zeytun Medical Center, 2003
- Vladimir Avagyan Medical Center, 2003
- Nairi Medical Center, 2004
- Surb Grigor Lusavorich Medical Center, 2004
- Yerevan Medical Center, 2007
- Avangard Medical Centre, 2011
- SlavMed Medical Center, 2014
- Elit-Med Medical Center, 2014
- Wigmore Clinic Medical Center, 2015
- National Centre for Mental Health Care
- Muratsan Hospital Complex
- Vitamed Medical Center, 2022
- Center of recovery, preventive and traditional medicine Altmed, 2001

== See also ==
- List of hospitals in Armenia
