= Leopoldo Vega =

Filipino physician

Undersecretary for Special Concerns of the Department of Health
- Incumbent
- Assumed office June 5, 2020
- President: Rodrigo Duterte
- Preceded by: Jade F. del Mundo

Treatment Czar of the National Task Force Against COVID-19
- Incumbent
- Assumed office July 13, 2020
- President: Rodrigo Duterte
- Preceded by: Position created

Personal details
- Born: Leopoldo Jumalon Vega; November 4, 1955 (age 70) Davao City, Philippines
- Spouse: Amelia Avelino
- Children: 2
- Education: Ateneo de Manila University (BA, MBA); University of the East (MD)
- Occupation: Government official
- Profession: Medical doctor, surgeon and hospital administrator

Leopoldo "Bong" Jumalon Vega (born November 4, 1955) is a Filipino physician, surgeon and former hospital administrator serving as an undersecretary of the Department of Health since 2020. Prior to joining the administration of President Rodrigo Duterte, he served as medical center chief of the state-run Southern Philippines Medical Center in Davao City for twelve years. On July 13, 2020, Vega was appointed to the National Task Force Against Coronavirus under the Inter-Agency Task Force for the Management of Emerging Infectious Diseases as COVID-19 Treatment Czar.

== Early life and education ==
Vega was born and raised in Davao City, the son of Garcilaso Vega, a lawyer, and Beatrice Jumalon. He received his primary and secondary education at the Ateneo de Davao and then moved to Quezon City to attend the Ateneo de Manila University. He graduated with a Bachelor of Arts in General Studies in 1975. Vega obtained his Doctor of Medicine in 1979 from the University of the East Ramon Magsaysay Memorial Medical Center. He then passed the Physicians Licensure Exam in 1980 and completed his surgery training back in his hometown of Davao at the Davao Medical Center in 1985. In 1986, Vega passed the Philippine Board of Surgery Examinations.

Vega also attended a Health Management program at the Asian Institute of Management in 2005 and earned a Master of Business Administration from the Ateneo Graduate School of Business in 2009. He was also trained on cardiothoracic surgery at the Philippine Heart Center and completed the Hospital Management Program of the Singapore Management University in 2016.

== Career ==
Vega first practiced medicine at the government-owned Davao Medical Center in 1981. He moved to private practice in 1985 and served in the cooperative hospital of the Philippines' first medical cooperative, the Medical Mission Group Health and Hospital Services Cooperative (MMGHHSC), as its program coordinator. He began his 21-year career as an associate professor at the Davao Medical School Foundation in 1987 and served as part of the Davao City local government's organizing committee for community-based health programs for four years beginning in 1988. Between 1991 and 1997, Vega served as chairman of the MMGHHSC cooperative where he earlier served as program coordinator for the Cooperative Health Fund. As chair of the Davao-based cooperative, the MMGHHSC grew to 51 chapters nationwide. He returned to this position in 1999, which he held until 2003, and also served in the board of the Cooperative Bank of Davao City until 2001 and as program coordinator of the MMGHHSC Federation from 2001 to 2003 and the Air Transport Cooperative in 2001.

In 2003, Vega was hired as the first medical chief of the Davao Medical School Foundation where he has been teaching medicine since 1987. As medical school administrator, he supervised the construction of the school's first hospital base for medical students in 2004. In April 2008, Vega returned to the Davao Medical Center, then renamed to Southern Philippines Medical Center (SPMC), as its medical center chief. As SPMC administrator, Vega oversaw the creation of a subnational laboratory of the Research Institute for Tropical Medicine National Influenza Center in Davao City during the 2009 swine flu pandemic. He also oversaw the construction of isolation facilities in the hospital which facilitated treatment during the 2014–15 MERS-CoV outbreak. During his tenure as SPMC chief, the government hospital saw significant expansion with the completion of the Heart Institute in 2007, the Cancer Institute in 2012 and the Institute for Women's Health in 2018.

During the early stages of the COVID-19 pandemic in the Davao Region in 2020, Vega was at the forefront of the response to the health crisis in Davao City running Mindanao's first and only subnational COVID-19 diagnostic laboratory at SPMC. He is credited for working alongside the Davao local government in putting up isolation centers and preparing the hospital for the eventual surge in cases by March 2020. On June 5, 2020, Vega left his 39-year career as a hospital administrator and doctor specializing in cardiothoracic surgery to join government service after he was appointed by President Rodrigo Duterte as Undersecretary for Special Concerns of the Department of Health. A month later, he was appointed by President Duterte to the national coronavirus task force as COVID-19 treatment czar.

As health undersecretary and task force treatment chief, Vega heads the One Hospital Command Center (OHCC) located at the Metropolitan Manila Development Authority Gymnasium in Makati which oversees and coordinates the critical care capacity of all hospitals and treatment and monitoring facilities in Metro Manila amid the health crisis. He also spearheaded the creation of other regional OHCC systems in Central Luzon, Calabarzon and Davao Region for closer monitoring of local quarantine sites.

During his tenure at the Department of Health, he held the position of Chief of Staff, where he led two significant clusters within the department: (1) Office of the Chief of Staff: Under this cluster, he provided astute oversight to the Legal Service, Internal Audit Service, and Health Emergency Management Bureau, and (2) Administration and Financial Management Team: Within this purview, he managed the Administrative Service and Finance Management Service.

His leadership in these roles played a pivotal role in ensuring the smooth operation and efficient management of these essential clusters of the Department of Health. Assisting him during his tenure was EnP. Raemond Angelo Karagdag, Executive Assistant IV. Together, they worked diligently to advance the department's mission and objectives.

== Personal life ==
Vega is married to Amelia Avelino. They have two adult children. His daughter Beatrice was appointed to the Duterte administration as assistant secretary of the Office of the President in 2018, and before the end of the term of the administration, she was appointed as NAPOLCOM Commissioners.

== Awards ==
Vega is a recipient of the 2008 Ten Outstanding Filipino Physicians award conferred by Junior Chamber International Philippines. He also received the Leaders and Achievers of Davao (LEAD) Award in the field of health.
