= NMMC =

NMMC may refer to:

- National Maritime Museum Cornwall, England
- National Museum of the Marine Corps, Quantico, Virginia
- Navi Mumbai Municipal Corporation, India
- Navoi Mining and Metallurgical Company, Uzbekistan
- Nissan Motor Manufacturing Corporation, a subsidiary of Nissan Motors in Tennessee, United States
- Nork-Marash Medical Center, a teach/research hospital in Armenia
- Northern Mindanao Medical Center, a government hospital in Cagayan de Oro City, Philippines
