= COVID-19 pandemic in Central Luzon =

Ongoing COVID-19 viral pandemic in Central Luzon, the Philippines

- Disease: COVID-19
- Pathogen: SARS-CoV-2
- Location: Central Luzon
- First outbreak: Wuhan, Hubei, China
- Index case: San Jose del Monte, Bulacan
- Arrival date: March 9, 2020 (6 years, 7 months, 1 week and 4 days)
- Confirmed cases: ▲396,536
- Active cases: ▼1,972
- Recovered: ▲385,924
- Deaths: ▲8,640

Government website
- centralluzon.doh.gov.ph

The COVID-19 pandemic in Central Luzon is part of the worldwide pandemic of coronavirus disease 2019 (COVID-19) caused by severe acute respiratory syndrome coronavirus 2 (SARS-CoV-2). The virus reached Central Luzon on March 9, 2020, when the first case of the disease was confirmed in San Jose del Monte. All provinces in the region have recorded COVID-19 cases. As of August 14, 2022. Central Luzon has 376,747 cases with 6,995 deaths.

== Background ==
The first case was initially reported to be a resident of Santa Maria, Bulacan but was eventually clarified to be from San Jose del Monte, still in the same province. The patient had no travel history abroad. The first case per province by date of confirmation as is as follows:

- Pampanga – March 13, 2020
- Bataan – March 14, 2020
- Nueva Ecija – March 22, 2020
- Tarlac and Zambales – March 26, 2020; the first case in Tarlac was a 75-year-old woman from Barangay Patalan in Paniqui. The second patient waa 39-year-old man from Barangay Pinasling in Gerona. In Zambales the first case was a 73-year-old US citizen living in Barangay San Gregorio in San Antonio who had traveled from Cavite to Manila before returning to the province on March 15.
- Olongapo – March 28, 2020
- Aurora – August 12, 2020

On July 6, 2020, the number of confirmed COVID-19 cases in the region breached the 1,000 mark with 1,021 cases and 75 deaths.

== Tally of cases ==
Cumulative COVID-19 cases in Central Luzon based on numbers released on the DOH COVID-19 Tracker Updated November 15, 2022; 4:00 p.m. (PhST)
LGU	Cases	Deaths	Recov.	Active
Aurora	4,452	230	4,209	13
Bataan	44,720	1,145	43,360	215
Bulacan	148,144	2,188	145,303	653
Nueva Ecija	45,700	1,382	44,026	292
Pampanga	75,433	1,626	73,472	335
Tarlac	33,181	910	31,937	334
Zambales	14,208	548	13,598	62
Angeles City (HUC)	20,986	347	20,606	33
Olongapo City (HUC)	9,545	260	9,250	35
unknown	167	4	163	0
Total	▲396,536	▲8,640	▲385,924	▼1,972

== Response ==
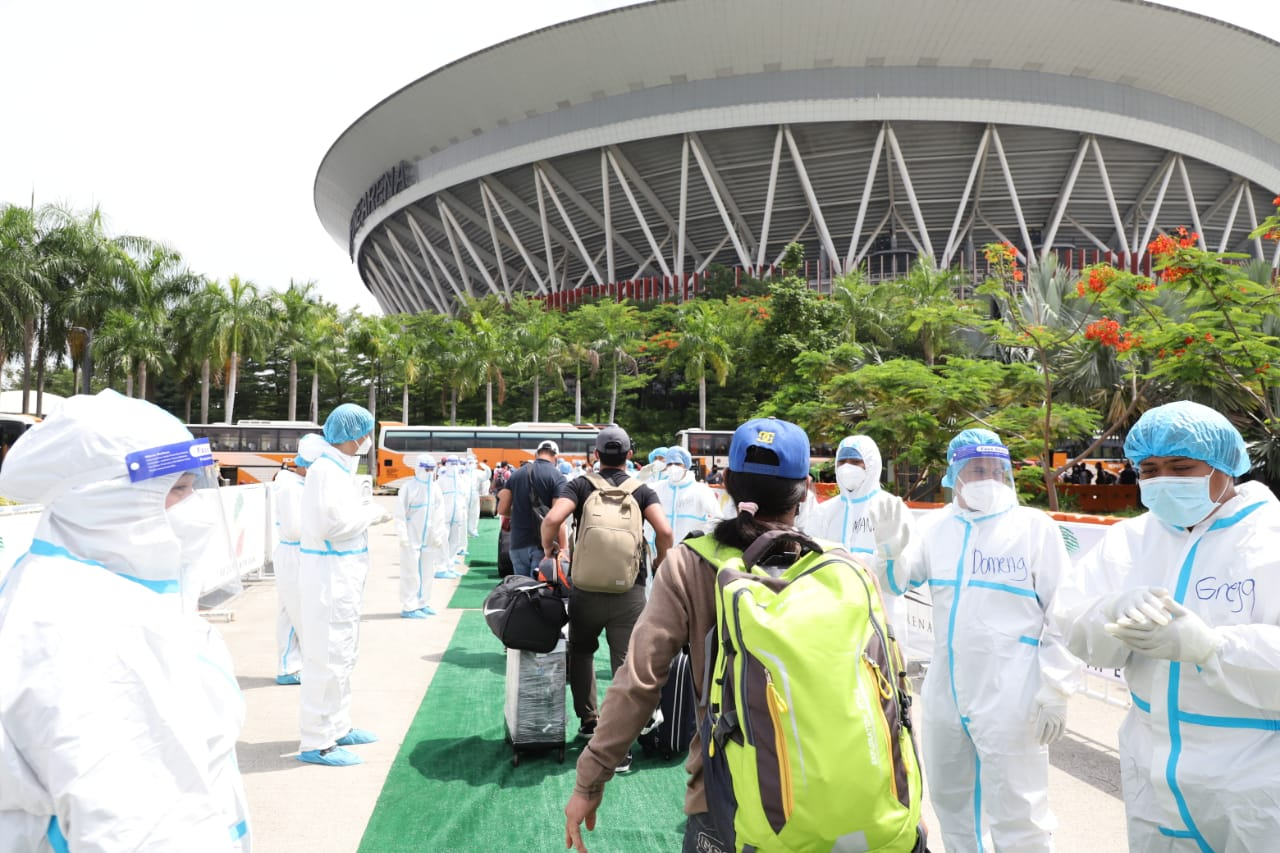
Former COVID-19 patients being discharged from the We Heal As One Center at the Philippine Arena Complex.

=== Repatriation from abroad ===
Central Luzon was also a major quarantine site for repatriates from abroad, particularly New Clark City Sports Hub in Capas, Tarlac. The first two COVID-19 cases among repatriates in New Clark City were confirmed on March 11.

=== Lockdowns ===
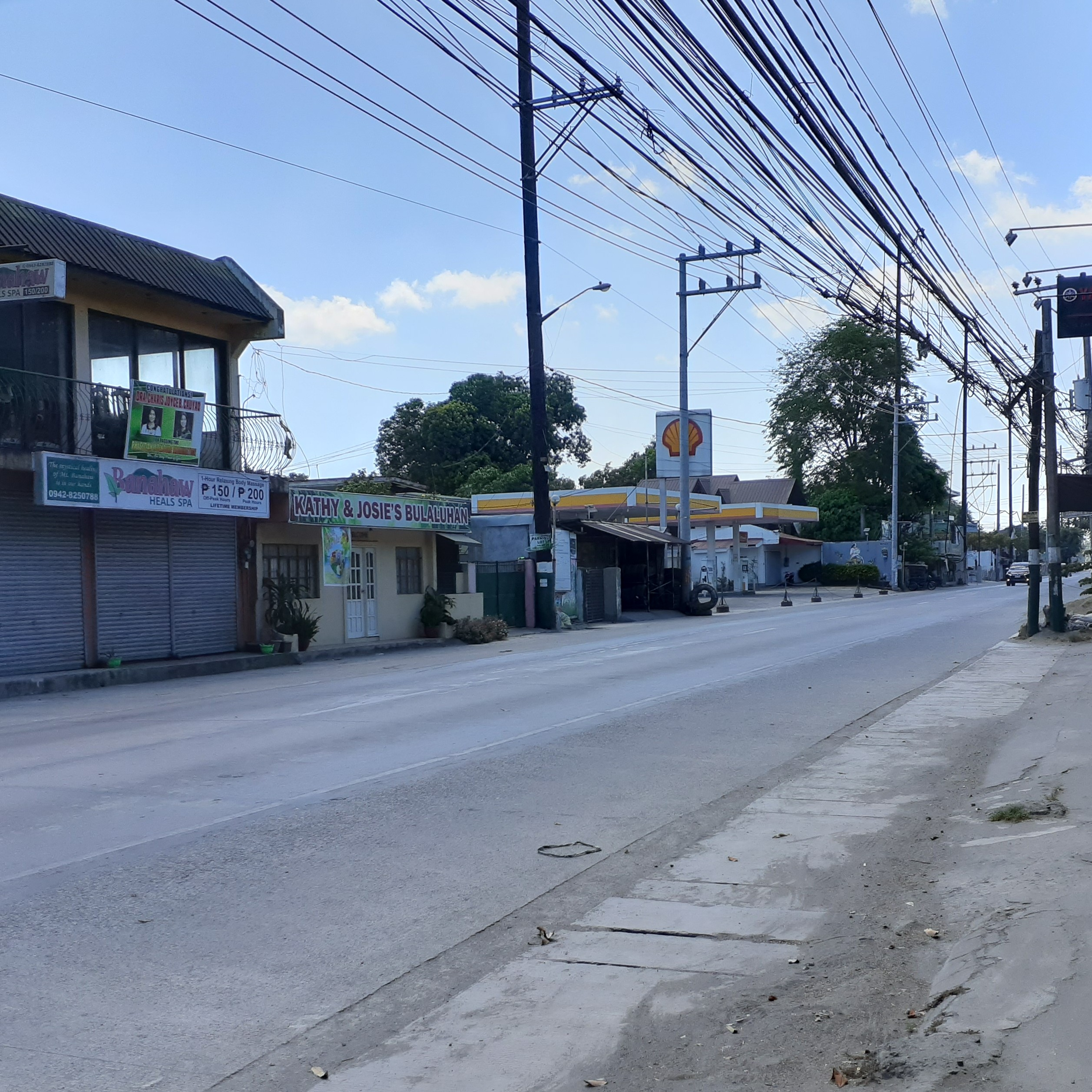
An empty Pulilan Regional Road in Pulilan, Bulacan on March 23, 2020, during the Luzon-wide enhanced community quarantine

The region is under the scope of the enhanced community quarantine in Luzon imposed by the national government on March 16, 2020.

=== Quarantine facilities ===
In April 2020, the national government began converting the ASEAN Convention Center at the Clark Freeport Zone, Pampanga and the National Government Administrative Center in Capas, Tarlac to COVID-19 quarantine facilities. The Iglesia ni Cristo also allowed the national government to lend the Philippine Arena at the Ciudad de Victoria in Bulacan to be re-purposed for the same reason. The INC also offered the Garden Suites, also within the CDV as temporary residence for health workers.

=== Testing ===
Initially, suspected COVID-19 cases in Central Luzon are tested at the Research Institute for Tropical Medicine and Lung Center of the Philippines in Metro Manila. The Jose B. Lingad Regional Memorial Hospital in Pampanga was the first facility being prepared as a possible COVID-19 testing center for the region. As of March 19, 2021, there are 17 accredited testing laboratories in the region: two in Bataan, five in Bulacan, five in Pampanga, three in Tarlac and two in Zambales.
