= DRMC =

DRMC may refer to:

- Dhaka Residential Model College, an autonomous college in Bangladesh
- Davao Regional Medical Center, a public hospital in the Philippines
