= COVID-19 pandemic in Northern Mindanao =

Ongoing COVID-19 viral pandemic in Northern Mindanao, the Philippines

- Disease: COVID-19
- Pathogen: SARS-CoV-2
- Location: Northern Mindanao
- First outbreak: Wuhan, Hubei, China
- Index case: Cagayan de Oro
- Arrival date: March 11, 2020 (6 years, 2 months and 1 week)
- Confirmed cases: 112,422
- Recovered: 110,546
- Deaths: 1,144

Government website
- ro10.doh.gov.ph

The COVID-19 pandemic in Northern Mindanao is part of the worldwide pandemic of coronavirus disease 2019 (COVID-19) caused by severe acute respiratory syndrome coronavirus 2 (SARS-CoV-2). The virus reached Northern Mindanao on March 11, 2020, when the first case of the disease was confirmed in Cagayan de Oro.

== Timeline ==
The first case in the whole Mindanao was confirmed on March 11, 2020; that of a 54-year-old male Lanao del Sur resident. The patient was admitted to a private hospital in Iligan and was later referred to the Northern Mindanao Medical Center in Cagayan de Oro on March 8, 2020. The man had no travel history abroad but has recently traveled Metro Manila for work. Iligan recorded its first COVID-19 case, also Northern Mindanao's second case, on March 24, 2020.

The first cases in other provinces of Northern Mindanao are as follow: Camiguin (March 28), Misamis Occidental (March 29), and Bukidnon (April 9) Lanao del Norte has also reported at least a case.

The first cases in Bukidnon and Lanao del Norte has been linked to a cockfighting derby in Matina, Davao City. The derby has been associated to the spread of COVID-19 to other parts of Mindanao.

By May 7, 2020, local transmission in Cagayan de Oro has been confirmed with the city's latest three cases involving individuals with no travel history to affected areas.

Misamis Oriental recorded its first case on June 12, 2020, that of a returning resident of Libertad who arrived in the province on June 6, 2020.

Several CoronaVac COVID-19 vaccines, which were stored at Misamis Oriental Provincial Health Office, have been considered unusable after being exposed from the intense heat of a fire which broke out off the building on April 14, 2021.
