= First Misamis Oriental General Hospital =

Government hospital in Misamis Oriental, Philippines

Geography
- Location: Medina, Misamis Oriental, Northern Mindanao, Philippines
- Coordinates: 8°54′44″N 125°01′30″E

Organization
- Funding: Government hospital

The First Misamis Oriental General Hospital is a government hospital in the Philippines. It was formerly an extension hospital of the Northern Mindanao Medical Center known as the Medina Extension Hospital. It is located in Medina, Misamis Oriental.

In 1948, the Puericulture Center and Women's Club in the Municipality of Medina, Province of Misamis Oriental established a maternity hospital to primarily serve the women and children of their community. Monthly subsidy from the provincial government for a time sustained the personnel and operations of the facility until 2005. The Club then donated the hospital to the Department of Health, and the hospital resumed operations as a 25-bed capacity satellite facility of the Northern Mindanao Medical Center that offered maternal and child health and other preventive, curative, and rehabilitative services. As Medina Extension Hospital, as of 2020, the facility is licensed as a 28-bed capacity infirmary. On June 24, 2021, the President signed Republic Act No. 11565, “An Act Converting the Medina Extension Hospital in the Municipality of Medina, Province of Misamis Oriental into a General Hospital to be known as the First Misamis Oriental General Hospital, and Appropriating Funds Therefor”. Section 3 provided for the preparation and issuance of implementing rules and regulations of the Act by the DOH, which shall also be in accordance with R.A. No. 11223, Universal Health Care Act, which ensures that all Filipinos have equitable access to quality health care goods and services.
