= List of hospitals in Armenia =

As of 2022, there are 104 hospitals operating in Armenia, of which 46 are located in the capital Yerevan.

== Hospitals ==
=== Yerevan ===
- Scientific Research Institute of Spa Treatment and Physical Medicine, 1930
- Research Center of Maternal and Child Health Protection, 1931
- Shengavit Medical Center, 1938
- Heratsi Hospital Complex №1, 1940
- Scientific Center of Traumatology and Orthopedics, 1946
- National Center of Oncology named after V.A. Fanarjian, 1946
- Professor R. Yeolyan Haematology Center, 1947
- Nork Republican Infectious Clinical Hospital, 1956
- Kanaker-Zeytun Maternity Hospital, 1958
- Scientific Research Institute of Cardiology, 1961
- Grigor Narekatsi Medical Center, 1962
- Astghik Medical Center, 1965
- Armenia Republican Medical Center, 1969
- Scientific Medical Center of Dermatology and STD, 1969
- Avan Mental Health Center, 1971
- Aramyants Medical Center, 1972
- Mickaelyan Institute of Surgery, 1974
- ArtMed Medical Rehabilitation Center, 1976
- Sergey Malayan's Eye Center, 1978
- Sourb Astvatsamayr Medical Center, 1982
- Erebouni Medical Center, 1983
- Izmirlian Medical Center, 1986
- Yerevan Anti-tuberculosis Dispensary, 1987
- New-Med Center of Urology, 1989
- Saint Astvatsatsin Maternity Hospital, 1992
- Republican Pediatric Rehabilitation Center, 1992
- Cross Health Center, 1992
- Republican Institute of Reproductive Health, Perinatology, Obstetrics and Gynaelogy, 1993
- Nork-Marash Medical Center, 1994
- Arabkir Joint Medical Center and Institute of Child and Adolescent Health, 1995
- ArBeS Healthcare Center for Rehabilitation, 1999
- Armenicum Clinical Center, 1999
- Yerevan Endocrinological Dispensary, 1999
- Kanaker-Zeytun Medical Center, 2003
- Vladimir Avagyan Medical Center, 2003
- Nairi Medical Center, 2004
- Surb Grigor Lusavorich Medical Center, 2004
- Yerevan Medical Center, 2007
- Avangard Medical Centre, 2011
- SlavMed Medical Center, 2014
- Elit-Med Medical Center, 2014
- Wigmore Clinic Medical Center, 2015
- National Centre for Mental Health Care
- Muratsan Hospital Complex
- Vitamed Medical Center, 2022
- Center of recovery, preventive and traditional medicine Altmed, 2001

=== Aragatsotn ===
- Ashtarak Medical Center (Ashtarak, 1951)
- Aparan Medical Center (Aparan, 1976)
- Tsaghkahovit Medical Center (Tsaghkahovit, 1976)
- Talin Medical Center (Talin)

=== Ararat ===
- Ararat Medical Centre
- Arabkir Medical Center, Ararat branch
- Artashat Medical Center
- Masis Medical Center
- Vedi Maternity Hospital
- Vedi Medical Center

=== Armavir ===
- Armavir Medical Center
- Ejmiatsin Medical Center (Vagharshapat, 1967)
- Metsamor Medical Center (Metsamor, 1978)

=== Gegharkunik ===
- Gavar Medical Center
- Martuni Maternity Hospital
- Martuni Medical Center
- Sevan Medical Center
- Sevan Psychiatric Hospital (Sevan, 1952)
- Vardenis Hospital

=== Kotayk ===
- Abovyan Medical Centre named after Rubik Harutyunyan (Abovyan, 1967)
- National Tuberculosis Center of the Ministry of Health (Abovyan, 1967)
- Abovyan Maternity Hospital (Abovyan, 1996)
- Charentsavan medical Center (Charentsavan, 1967)
- Hrazdan Medical Center (Hrazdan, 1935)
- Nairi Medical Center (Yeghvard, 1984)

=== Lori ===
- Alaverdi Medical Center (Alaverdi)
- Spitak Medical Center (Spitak)
- Stepanavan Medical Center (Stepanavan)
- Vitamed medical center (Stepanavan)
- Tashir Medical Center (Tashir)
- Lori Provincial Psychoneurological Dispensary (Vanadzor)
- Vanadzor Medical Center (Vanadzor, 2011)

=== Shirak ===
- Akhuryan Medical Center (Akhuryan, 1979)
- ARS Akhourian Mother and Child Health Center (Akhuryan, 1991)
- Artik Medical Center (Artik)
- Center of Maternal and Child Health Protection of Artik (Artik)
- Tiramayr Narek Hospital, (Ashotsk, 1992)
- Gyumri Maternity Hospital (Gyumri, 1937)
- Gyumri Oncological Dispensary (Gyumri, 1969)
- Samariter Rehabilitation Center (Gyumri, 1989)
- Austrian Children's Hospital of Gyumri (Gyumri, 1992)
- Arie Kuperstock Rehabilitation Center (Gyumri, 1992)
- Gyumri Mental Health Center (Gyumri, 1996
- V. Abajyan Family Medical Center (Gyumri, 2000)
- White Hospital (Gyumri, 2002)
- Gyumri Infectious Anti-Tuberculosis Hospital (Gyumri, 2007)
- Gyumri Medical Center (Gyumri, 2012)
- Gyumri Dermato-Venereology and Cosmetology Center (Gyumri)

=== Syunik ===
- Goris Medical Center (Goris, 1928)
- Kajaran Medical Center (Kajaran)
- Kapan Medical Center (Kapan, 1930)
- Syunik Provincial Anti-Tuberculosis Dispensary (Kapan)
- Syunik Provincial Psychoneurological Dispensary (Kapan, 1996)
- Meghri Regional Medical Center (Meghri, 2010)
- Sisian Medical Center (Sisian)

=== Tavush ===
- Berd Medical Center
- Ijevan Medical Center
- Noyemberyan Medical Center

=== Vayots Dzor ===
- Vayk Medical Association (Vayk, 1962)
- Yeghegnadzor Medical Center (Yeghegnadzor)

== Military hospitals ==
- Central Clinical Military Hospital (Yerevan, 1994)
- Yerevan Garrison Hospital (Yerevan, 2016)
- Vanadzor Military Hospital (Vanadzor)
- Sisian Military Hospital (Aghitu)
- Hospital of Medical Department of Police of Armenia (Yerevan)

== See also ==
- Health in Armenia
