= COVID-19 pandemic in Calabarzon =

Viral pandemic in Calabarzon, Philippines

- Disease: COVID-19
- Pathogen: SARS-CoV-2
- Location: Calabarzon
- First outbreak: Wuhan, Hubei, China
- Index case: Cainta, Rizal
- Arrival date: March 5, 2020 (6 years, 7 months, 1 week and 4 days)
- Confirmed cases: ▲731,358
- Active cases: ▼1,340
- Recovered: ▲723,294
- Deaths: ▲6,724

Government website
- ro4a.doh.gov.ph

The COVID-19 pandemic in Calabarzon is part of the worldwide pandemic of coronavirus disease 2019 (COVID-19) caused by severe acute respiratory syndrome coronavirus 2 (SARS-CoV-2). The virus reached Calabarzon on March 7, 2020, when the first case of the disease was confirmed in Rizal. All provinces in the region have confirmed cases. As of May 2, 2023, the region has 731,358 confirmed cases, with 6,724 deaths.

== Background ==
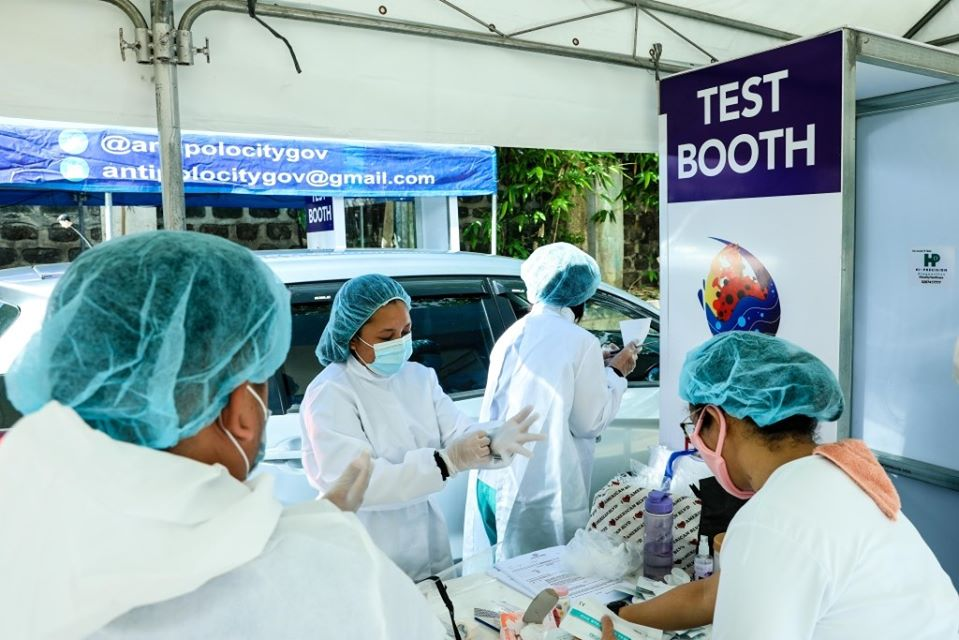
COVID-19 testing in Rizal.

The first confirmed COVID-19 case in Calabarzon was a 62-year-old male, a resident of Cainta, Rizal, who frequented the Greenhills Masjid, a Muslim prayer hall in San Juan, Metro Manila. The patient was admitted at the Cardinal Santos Medical Center, also in San Juan, on March 1, 2020, and was diagnosed with severe pneumonia. The case was confirmed on March 5 and the patient referred to the Research Institute for Tropical Medicine in Muntinlupa. This individual had no travel history abroad and was the first confirmed local transmission of COVID-19 in the country. The patient's wife also contracted the disease.

Mayor Kit Nieto of Cainta ordered the immediate provision of face masks and disinfectants in areas near the residence of the patient. The patient's family, as well as his neighbors, were placed under quarantine. Nieto suspended classes in Cainta from March 7 to 10 and placed the municipality under community quarantine beginning on March 15.

Aside from Rizal, all provinces have confirmed cases. The first case per province by date of confirmation as is as follows:

- Cavite – March 10
- Batangas – March 13
- Laguna and Quezon – March 15; the first two cases in Quezon were from Lucena, a highly-urbanized city that is geographically part of Quezon but administered independently from the province. The first Quezon case outside Lucena was linked to the municipality of Sariaya.

== Statistics ==
Cumulative COVID-19 cases in Calabarzon based on numbers confirmed and validated by the DOH COVID-19 Tracker As of January 3, 2022
Province or HUC	Cases	Deaths	Recov.	Active
Batangas	74,263	953	72,871	439
Cavite	163,524	1,220	160,820	1,364
Laguna	124,900	1,479	122,704	717
Quezon	23,458	304	22,651	503
Lucena	7,264	117	6,990	157
Rizal	105,560	1,531	103,013	1,016
Total	498,969	5,048	472,674	8,454
† Lucena is a highly-urbanized city; figures are excluded from Quezon province.

== Response ==
Calabarzon was under the scope of the enhanced community quarantine in Luzon imposed by the national government from March 16, 2020.

On May 16, Calabarzon (except Laguna) was downgraded to general community quarantine (GCQ).

On August 1, Lipa was placed under a 15-day lockdown and the province of Batangas was placed under GCQ. On August 4, the modified ECQ status was reinstated for Cavite, Laguna, and Rizal, all of which surround Metro Manila. On August 19, the aforementioned provinces were downgraded to GCQ.

On September 1, the entire region except for Batangas was downgraded to modified GCQ.

On March 22, 2021, in view of the grim rising of new COVID-19 cases, the GCQ status, this time with additional restrictions, was reinstated over Cavite, Laguna, and Rizal.

Alongside Metro Manila and Bulacan, these areas were collectively given the designation "NCR Plus" and the restrictions placed on the area is described essentially as a GCQ-MECQ hybrid. On March 27, it was announced that "NCR Plus" would be placed under ECQ from March 29 to April 4; it would later be extended up to April 11. On April 12, the area was then downgraded to modified ECQ, while Quezon was elevated to GCQ. On May 15, the provinces under the NCR Plus bubble were downgraded to GCQ with "heightened restrictions." From June 16 to July 15, the city of Lucena was placed under MECQ. On July 1, Rizal was downgraded to normal GCQ. On July 16, Lucena was downgraded to GCQ with "heightened restrictions," while Cavite was downgraded to normal GCQ. Effective August 1 to 15, Rizal and Cavite would be upgraded back to GCQ with "heightened restrictions," while Laguna was upgraded to MECQ.
