= Shengavit Medical Center =

Shengavit Medical Center Շենգավիթ բժշկական կենտրոն
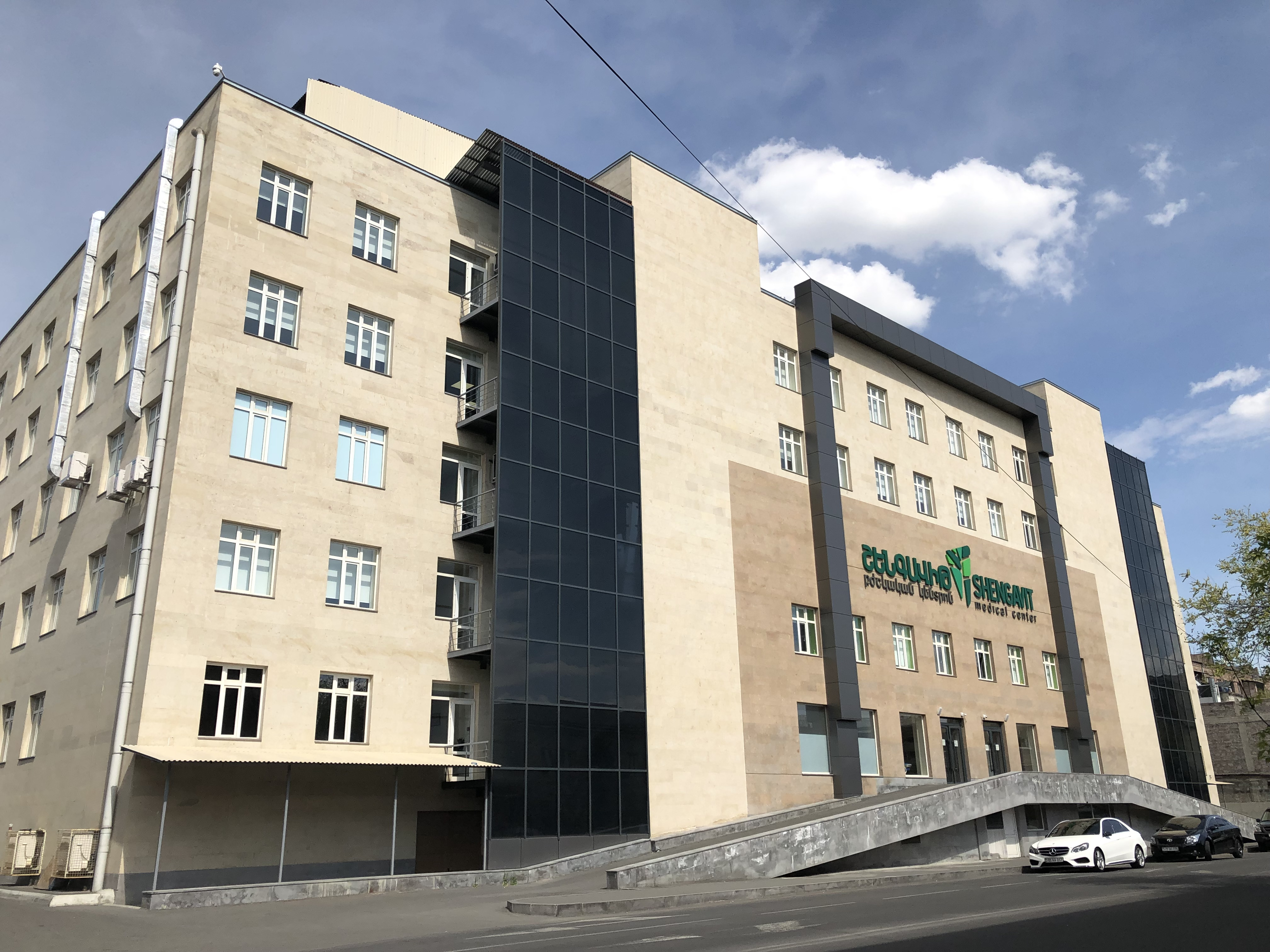

Geography
- Location: 9 Manandian Street, Yerevan, Armenia
- Coordinates: 40.1530°N 44.4876°E

Organisation
- Type: Specialist
- Affiliated university: Yerevan State Medical University

Services
- Beds: 65
- Speciality: Maternity, Gynecolory, Neonatal Intensive Care, Surgery, Ophthalmology, ENT

History
- Former name: Clinical Maternity Hospital No.3
- Founded: 1938

Links
- Website: www.mcshengavit.com
- Lists: Hospitals in Armenia

The Shengavit Medical Center (Armenian: Շենգավիթ բժշկական կենտրոն) is a multi-disciplinary therapeutic and diagnostic hospital facilities in Yerevan, Armenia. It is the base of the clinical postgraduate training for Yerevan State Medical University and the Ministry of Health (Armenia). The Center operates the following services: obstetrics, operative and endoscopic gynecology, oncology, reproductology, general and endoscopic surgery, micro- and plastic surgery, vascular surgery, ophthalmology, ENT, anesthesiology and critical care medicine, dentistry, diagnostic center, and a clinical laboratory. There are 65 beds available in the hospital, with an average of 7000 patients served per year.

== History ==
In 1938, the Clinical Maternity Hospital No.3 of Yerevan was established. The current building has been operational since 1964. In 2001, the maternity hospital was transformed into the Shengavit Medical Center with a share belonging to the Yerevan municipality. In 2002, the ownership of the hospital became the property of the staff and it was reorganized into a multi-disciplinary clinical-diagnostic institution.

== See also ==
- List of hospitals in Yerevan
