= Raffi Qasabian =

- Citizenship: Australia
- Education: University of Sydney
- Scientific career
- Fields: Vascular surgery, Endovascular surgery
- Workplaces: Royal Prince Alfred Hospital

Raffi Qasabian is an Australian-Armenian vascular surgeon, and secretary of the NSW Regional Committee of the Royal Australasian College of Surgeons. He completed his surgical studies in Australia and gained additional experience in vascular and endovascular surgery during a fellowship year at St Thomas' Hospital in London in 2007. He works at Royal Prince Alfred Hospital. He is also a coordinator of the Surgical Course at the Central Clinical School of the University of Sydney.

== Charity work ==
Dr. Qasabian is a grandson of Armenian refugees and a first-generation Australian. Driven by his Armenian heritage, Raffi has been visiting Nork-Marash Medical Center, providing charity services to advance vascular surgical care in Armenia. The first time he visited Armenia was in 2004, when he was still a vascular surgical trainee. In 2009, establishing himself as a clinician in Sydney, Dr. Qasabian Raffi started visiting Armenia twice a year, with support from Linette Shahinian, a fellow Armenian in Sydney.
