= Izmirlian Medical Center =

Coordinates: 40°12′19″N 44°32′02″E

- Mother See of Holy Etchmiadzin
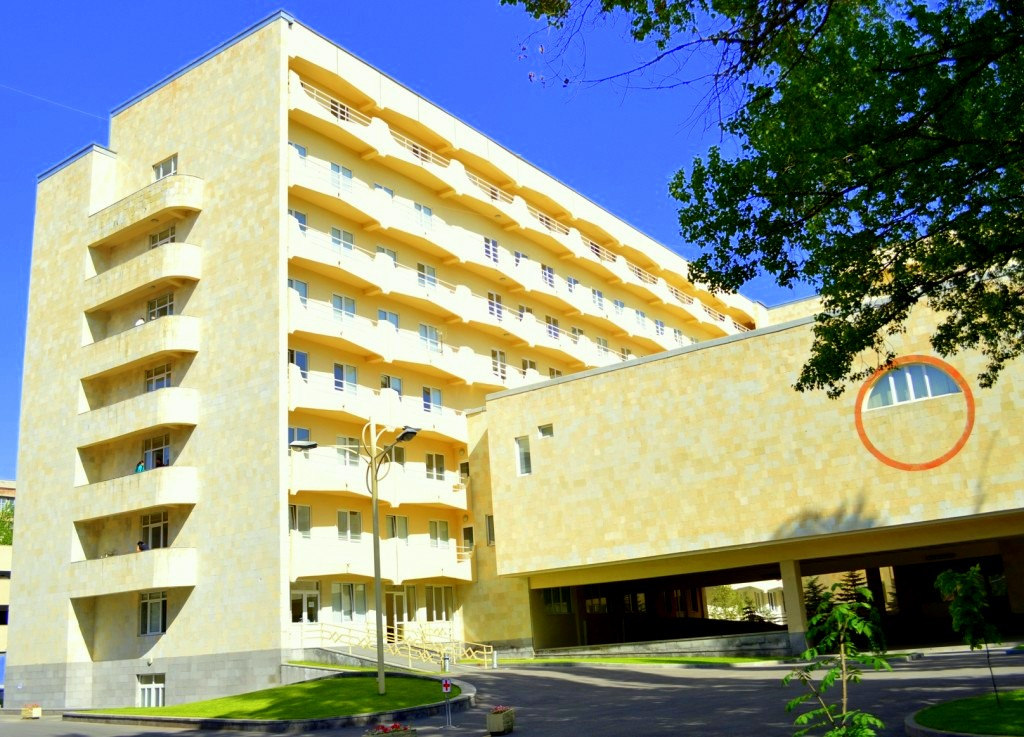

Geography
- Location: 6 Avetsis Aharonian street, Kanaker-Zeytun, Yerevan, Armenia

Organisation
- Affiliated university: Yerevan State Medical University

Services
- Beds: 139

History
- Opened: 1986; 2013 (refounded)

Links
- Website: Official website
- Lists: Hospitals in Armenia

Izmirlian Medical Center (Armenian: Իզմիրլյան բժշկական կենտրոն), is a medical center and research foundation located in the Armenian capital Yerevan. Opened in 1986, it is located in the Kanaker-Zeytun district and currently operates under the supervision of the Mother See of Holy Etchmiadzin. The Surb Nerses Mets Research and Education Center (Armenian: Սուրբ Ներսես Մեծ գիտաբժշկական կենտրոն), operates within the medical center.

== History ==
The medical center-institute was originally opened in 1986 in the Nor Zeytun neighbourhood of Yerevan as a center of proctology named after L. Nazarov. Between 1998 and 2000, the center was redeveloped by the New York-based Armenian General Benevolent Union to include a section for plastic surgery and other surgical specialties. In 2000, the center was granted to the Mother See of Holy Etchmiadzin and renamed as Surb Nerses Mets Medical Center, after the Catholicos of All Armenians Nerses I of the 4 the century.

In 2013, the center was entirely redeveloped through donations from the Izmirlian Family Foundation. US$12 million have been allocated for the redevelopment process and the construction of a new building. The hospital at the center was renamed in honor of the benefactor Dikran Izmirlian. Other Armenian benefactors from Brazil, United States and France have also contributed in the redevelopment of the center.

== Services ==
With a capacity of 139 beds, currently the medical center-institute has 15 sections:

- Coloproctology
- General proctology
- Orthopedics and sports traumatology
- General and laparoscopic surgery
- Urology
- Otorhinolaryngology / Plastic, oral and maxillofacial surgery
- Endoscopy and reconstructive gynaecology
- Anesthesiology, rehabilitation and ICU
- Cardiac surgery
- Cardiothoracic surgery
- Vascular surgery
- Robot-assisted surgery
- Hematology
- Computerized axial tomography scan
- Magnetic resonance imaging
- Advisory diagnostic
- Laboratory

Researches in the center are mainly conducted in the fields of urology, proctology, gastroenterology, etc. The center also hosts several conferences in urology throughout the year.
