= Caraga Regional Hospital =

Government hospital in Surigao del Norte, Philippines

- Department of Health
- Location within Mindanao mainland Location within Philippines

Geography
- Location: Surigao City, Surigao del Norte, Philippines
- Coordinates: 9°47′04″N 125°29′24″E

History
- Former names: Surigao Provincial Hospital; Surigao del Norte Provincial Hospital

Links
- Website: crh.doh.gov.ph

Caraga Regional Hospital is located in Surigao City, on the northeastern tip of the Philippine island of Mindanao. The government hospital is one of at least three hospitals serving the area. The three (Caraga, Miranda Hospital and Surigao Medical Center) all are located within 1 1/2 miles (2.4 km) of each other on National Road, which leads from the city proper south to the city airport.

== History ==
In 1941 the Philippine Commonwealth government appropriated money to establish a hospital in Surigao. However, in 1942 Japan seized control of the Philippines from the United States, disrupting plans to build the hospital. In 1948, after independence was achieved, construction began on what was to become Surigao Provincial Hospital. The building was completed at the end of 1949 and was opened in January 1950 with a capacity of twenty-five beds.

The hospital was expanded and the number of beds increased in 1958 to fifty beds. The hospital continued to grow to seventy-five beds and in 1970 it grew to 100 beds. The current number of beds, 150, was authorized in 1975. In 1993 the hospital was devolved by the Philippine government to the province of Surigao del Norte. On February 11, 1997, the hospital was renamed into Caraga Regional Hospital.

Today Caraga Regional provides many in-patient and out-patient services to the residents of the Surigao area.
