= Jose B. Lingad Memorial Regional Hospital =

Government hospital in Pampanga, Philippines

Jose B. Lingad Memorial General Hospital
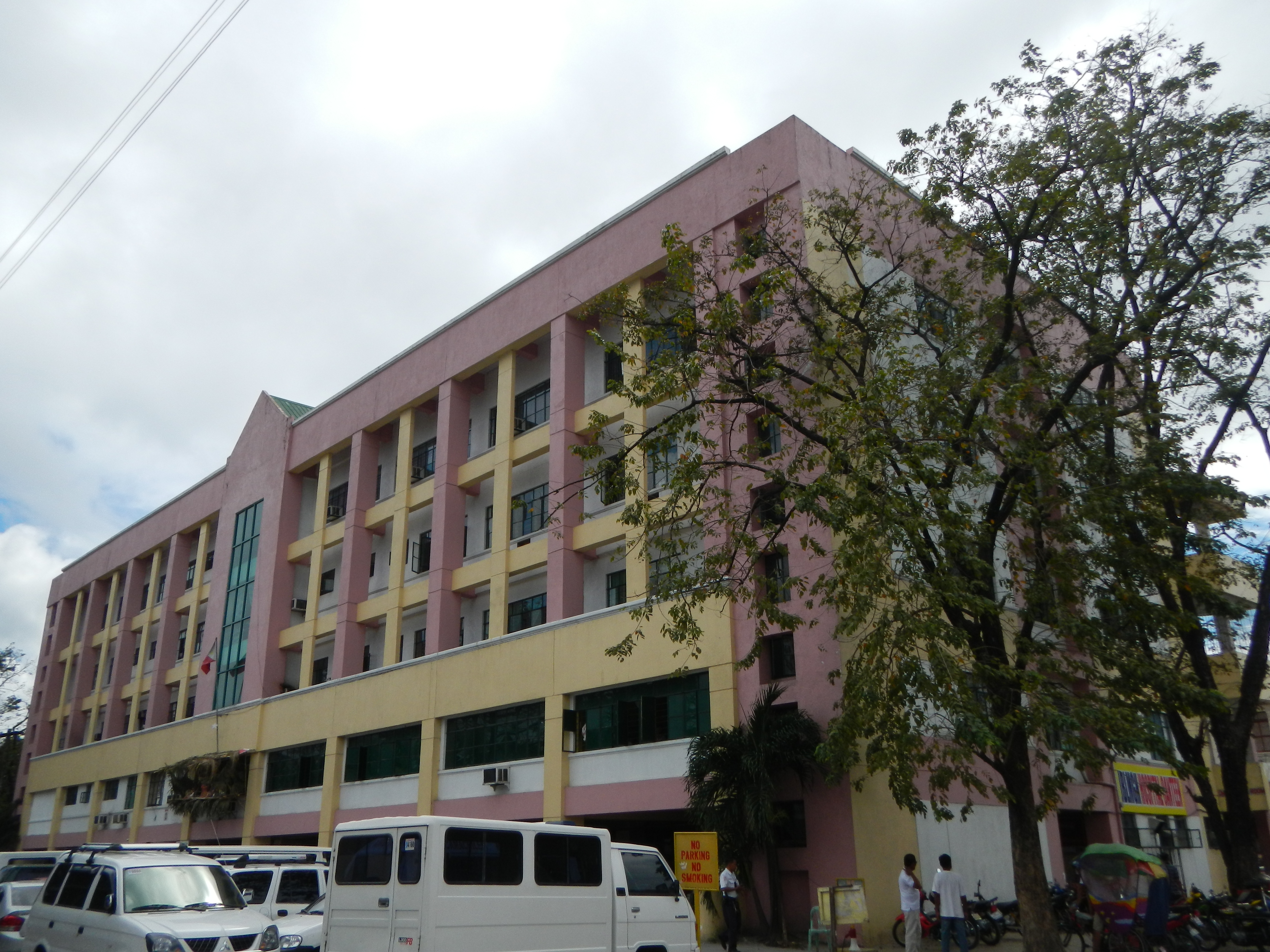

Geography
- Location: San Fernando, Pampanga, Philippines
- Coordinates: 15°02′04″N 120°41′04″E

Organization
- Care system: Public, Philippine Health Insurance Corporation (PhilHealth) accredited
- Type: Tertiary

Services
- Standards: Philippines Department of Health
- Beds: 2,000

History
- Founded: 1921

Links
- Website: jblmgh.doh.gov.ph
- Lists: Hospitals in the Philippines

The Jose B. Lingad Memorial General Hospital is located in San Fernando, Pampanga, Philippines. It is a Level III tertiary, training and teaching hospital with 1,000 authorized beds as mandated by Republic Act (R.A.) 6780 enacted in 1990. The hospital caters to the people of Region III, with the people of Pampanga as its primary catchment area and the nearby provinces of Bataan, Nueva Ecija, Bulacan, Tarlac, Zambales and Aurora as its secondary catchment areas.

The hospital was named after Kampampangan politician Jose B. Lingad in 1989. It was previously known as the Central Luzon General Hospital.

== See also ==
- Jose B. Lingad
