= Armenicum =

Drug invented in Armenia in 1998

Armenicum is a drug invented in Armenia in 1998 that its developers claim is an effective treatment for HIV infection and a number of associated diseases. No rigorously monitored clinical trials of Armenicum have been published, and most HIV experts outside of Armenia do not endorse its use.

== Efficacy ==
In 1999, a BBC investigation involving interviews with scientists involved in administering the drug, patients and creator Alexander Ilyin raised serious doubts about the drug's efficacy, concluding that Armenicum might do more harm than good. Dr. Manfred Dietrich of the Institute for Tropical Medicine in Hamburg told the BBC "I would not recommend at all to take such a drug." while an American patient said "we’re in a worse state than we were before we went."

== Ingredients ==
The main ingredient of Armenicum is iodine, a general antiseptic. According to the manufacturers it also contains dextrin, polyvinyl alcohol, sodium, potassium and lithium cations and chloride anions. It is described as a "blue-violet liquid with specific odor, packed in orange glass bottles per 20ml and corked tightly by a rubber plug clutched by aluminum caps."

== Clinical studies ==
Clinical studies of the drug (1998–2000) were carried out in the Intensive Care Unit of the 1st Infectious Clinical Hospital in Yerevan: head of department, Ph.D. Petr Artishchev (1994–2000). Phase 2A of clinical trials revealed a good tolerance of the drug, a certain direction of adverse events, which constituted an insignificant percentage of the number of observations. Laboratory diagnostics of the tests under study was carried out by the "Prom-Test" Laboratory as a Central laboratory. The head: Arthur Melkonyan. The scientific supervisor from the beginning of the study and until the end of his life was the head of Infectious Diseases department of Yerevan State Medical University, Ph.D. Levon Mkhitaryan (d. 2009). General management was entrusted to Prof. Emil Gabrielyan (d. 2010) – Director of the Republican Pharmacological Agency, who was a Minister of Health of the Armenian SSR in the past.

== Company ==
Later, the formed CJSC “Armenicum” acquired the buildings and the land of the 1st Infectious Clinical Hospital (2000). The reconstructed building was renamed into the “Armenicum Medical Center”, which to this day is engaged in the treatment of HIV infection and works on government orders.

== Kolesnikov controversy ==
On 8 September 2000, Nikolai Kolesnikov, who had received treatment for AIDS in "Armenicum" center in Armenia was reported dead in one of Kaliningrad hospitals. According to his doctors, Armenicum turned out to be a simple immunity modular, without any effect on the virus which continues to damage the cells in the human body.

In March 2005, Kolesnikov was reported to have frozen to death in his native Kaliningrad. There have been several other reports on his death over the years.

== Sources ==
- Armenicum website
- Scepticism over Aids 'cure'
- Access Armenicum
