= Nork-Marash Medical Center =

Geography
- Location: 13 Armenak Armenakyan st., Nork-Marash district, Yerevan, Armenia
- Coordinates: 40.1841°N 44.5376°E

Organisation
- Type: Teaching
- Affiliated university: Yerevan State Medical University

Services
- Beds: 80
- Speciality: Biomedical research

History
- Founded: 1994

Links
- Website: www.nmmc.am
- Lists: Hospitals in Armenia

The Nork-Marash Medical Center is a teaching hospital and biomedical research facility in Yerevan, Armenia, focused on cardiac care. It is led by Dr. Hrayr (Hagop) Hovagimian, a Syrian-Armenian cardiothoracic surgeon from the University of Aleppo and St. Vincent's Hospital, Portland.

== General information ==
The center consists of 3 basic clinical departments including the cardiothoracic surgery, adult cardiology and pediatric cardiology divisions. Along with traditional open heart surgery, it covers also interventional cardiology and minimally invasive cardiac surgery. Electrophysiological interventions and radiofrequency ablations used to be performed there, but arrhythmology team later moved to Erebouni Medical Center, becoming Arrhythmology Cardiology Center of Armenia under Smbat Jamalyan.

Founded in 1994 with the help of the charity organizations of the Armenian Diaspora, mainly from the United States, United Kingdom and France, Nork-Marash Medical Center became one of the leading hospitals in cardiac surgery in CIS countries.

Via its charity projects, the center has provided free cardiac surgical care for children from Russian Federation, Belarus, Kyrgyzstan, Uzbekistan, Tajikistan, Georgia, Syria. Dr. Raffi Qasabian, a prominent Australian-Armenian endovascular surgeon from Royal Prince Alfred Hospital, regularly visits NMMC, performing complex endovascular procedures.
