= Southern Philippines Medical Center =

Government hospital in Davao City, Philippines

- Department of Health
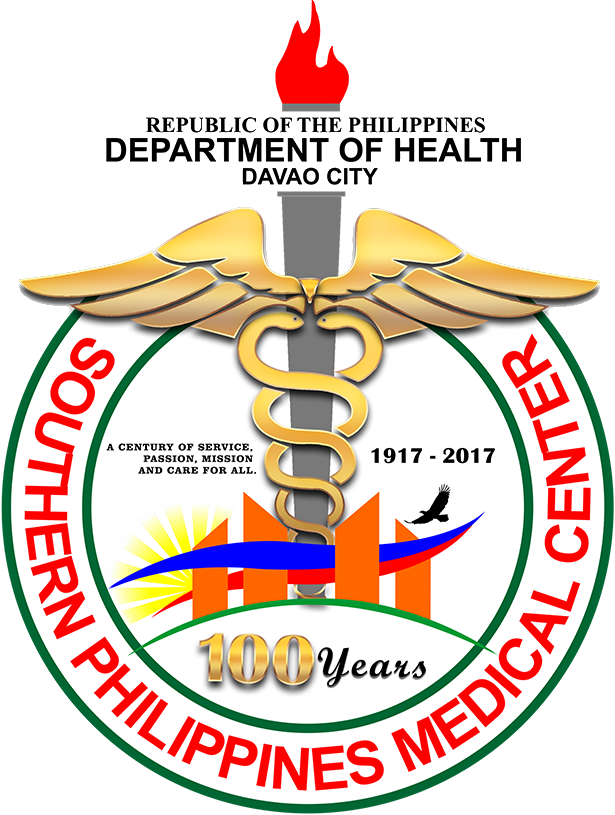

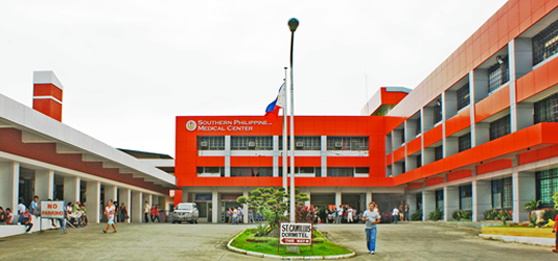

- Location within Mindanao mainland Location within Philippines

Geography
- Location: J.P. Laurel Avenue, Bajada, Davao City, Philippines
- Coordinates: 7°05′57″N 125°37′11″E

Services
- Beds: 1,500 (actual: >4000)

History
- Former names: Davao Public Hospital; Davao General Hospital; Davao Medical Center
- Opened: 1917

Links
- Website: spmc.doh.gov.ph
- Lists: Hospitals in the Philippines

The Southern Philippines Medical Center (SPMC) is a tertiary government hospital under the Department of Health of the Republic of the Philippines. It is located along J.P. Laurel Avenue in Bajada, Davao City. The hospital was originally established as the Davao Medical Center and was renamed the Southern Philippines Medical Center on November 19, 2009 through Republic Act 9792.

== History ==
The health facility was established in 1917 as the Davao Public Hospital. It was initially a 25-bed capacity hospital along San Pedro Street. In 1946, The hospital was renamed as the Davao General Hospital and its capacity was increased to about 200 beds. In 1957, the hospital transferred to its current location at JP Laurel Ave. in Bajada. It was renamed Davao Regional Medical and Training Center by virtue of the Republic Act 1859.

In 1966, the hospital was transferred to the current 12.8 hectares (32 acres) site. Because of its importance in health care delivery, the Department of Health issued Administrative Order 157 designating it as the medical center for Mindanao and Sulu. During the martial law years and the Moro and the communist rebellion in the Philippines, the hospital was the major trauma center.

In 1986, the Davao Mental Hospital, which had been an extension of the National Center for Mental Health was transferred to the hospital. At that time, the hospital was renamed the Davao Medical Center and the bed capacity was increased to 600. The name Davao Regional Hospital and Training Center was then transferred to the then Davao del Norte Provincial Hospital. In 2009, the bed capacity was further increased from 600 to 1,200.

In 2007, the hospital established the Mindanao Heart Center, which is the fifth government-run facility dedicated to heart services in the country.

It officially became the largest hospital in the Philippines after it was authorized to expand its capacity to 1,500 beds when the Republic Act No 11326 was approved on April 17, 2019, surpassing that of the Philippine General Hospital's 1,334 beds. The actual capacity of the hospital as of April 2019 is 4000 beds.

During the COVID-19 pandemic in the Philippines, Southern Philippines Medical Center became the main receiving center for COVID-19 patients in Mindanao. The hospital performed COVID-19 testing.

On November 28, 2025, the hospital opened its Kidney and Transplant Institute, providing kidney dialysis and transplant services to patients from Mindanao. The institute aimed for 100 dialysis beds.

== Facilities and management ==
The Southern Philippines Medical Center has several hospital buildings. This include:

- Main Building – Three floors
- Medical Arts Building – Seven floors
- Central ICU Building – Five floors
- Children Institute – Five floors
- Kidney Transplant Institute – Five floors
- Trauma Complex – Four floors
- Institute for Women's Health and Newborn – Four floors
- Orthopedic and Rehab Institute – Four floors
- OPD Building – Four floors
- Mindanao Heart Center – Three floors
- Cancer Institute – Three floors (main), two floors (extension)
- Isolation Facility Building – Two floors
- Institute for Psychiatry and Behavioral Medicine – Two floors

Although the hospital is located in Davao City and is the only public hospital in the city, it is not under the jurisdiction of the city government. The hospital is classified as a regional hospital.
