= Davao Regional Medical Center =

Government hospital in Davao del Norte, Philippines

Geography
- Location: Tagum, Davao Region, Philippines
- Coordinates: 7°25′19″N 125°49′43″E

Organization
- Funding: Government hospital
- Type: teaching and training hospital

Services
- Beds: 1000

History
- Opened: June 21, 1969

Links
- Website: drmc.doh.gov.ph//
- Lists: Hospitals in the Philippines

The Davao Regional Medical Center (DRMC) is a training government hospital in the Philippines. It was established in 1969 as the Davao del Norte National Hospital in Tagum. In 1992, now known as the Davao Regional Hospital, the bed capacity was increased from over 150 to 200. In 2015, the hospital further increased its capacity to 600 beds and became known under its current name. Currently, the hospital has 1000 beds.

== History ==
The health facility was established in 1969 as the Davao del Norte National Hospital under Republic Act 5702. Three years later, in 1972, the hospital had a 50-bed capacity and outpatient services at Toribio Building in Poblacion, Tagum. It was formally opened to the public on January 26, 1974.

In 1980, it was renamed to Davao Regional Hospital. Simultaneously, the hospital was reclassified to a regional hospital, expanding its bed capacity to 100 through Administrative Order No. 83 s. 1980. In 1992, the hospital's bed capacity was increased to 200 beds under Republic Act 7179.

On January 8, 2012, the hospital formally opened the first government-operated cancer facility in Mindanao, known as the Cancer Center for Mindanao.

On August 6, 2015, the hospital's bed capacity increased to 600 beds and at that point, it was converted to its current name under Republic Act 10678.

On October 8, 2019, the hospital opened an extension of the ward infirmary in Barangay San Isidro, Sawata, Davao del Norte.

On June 29, 2022, the hospital's bed capacity increased to 1000 beds.
