= Northern Mindanao Medical Center =

Government hospital in Cagayan de Oro, Philippines

- Department of Health
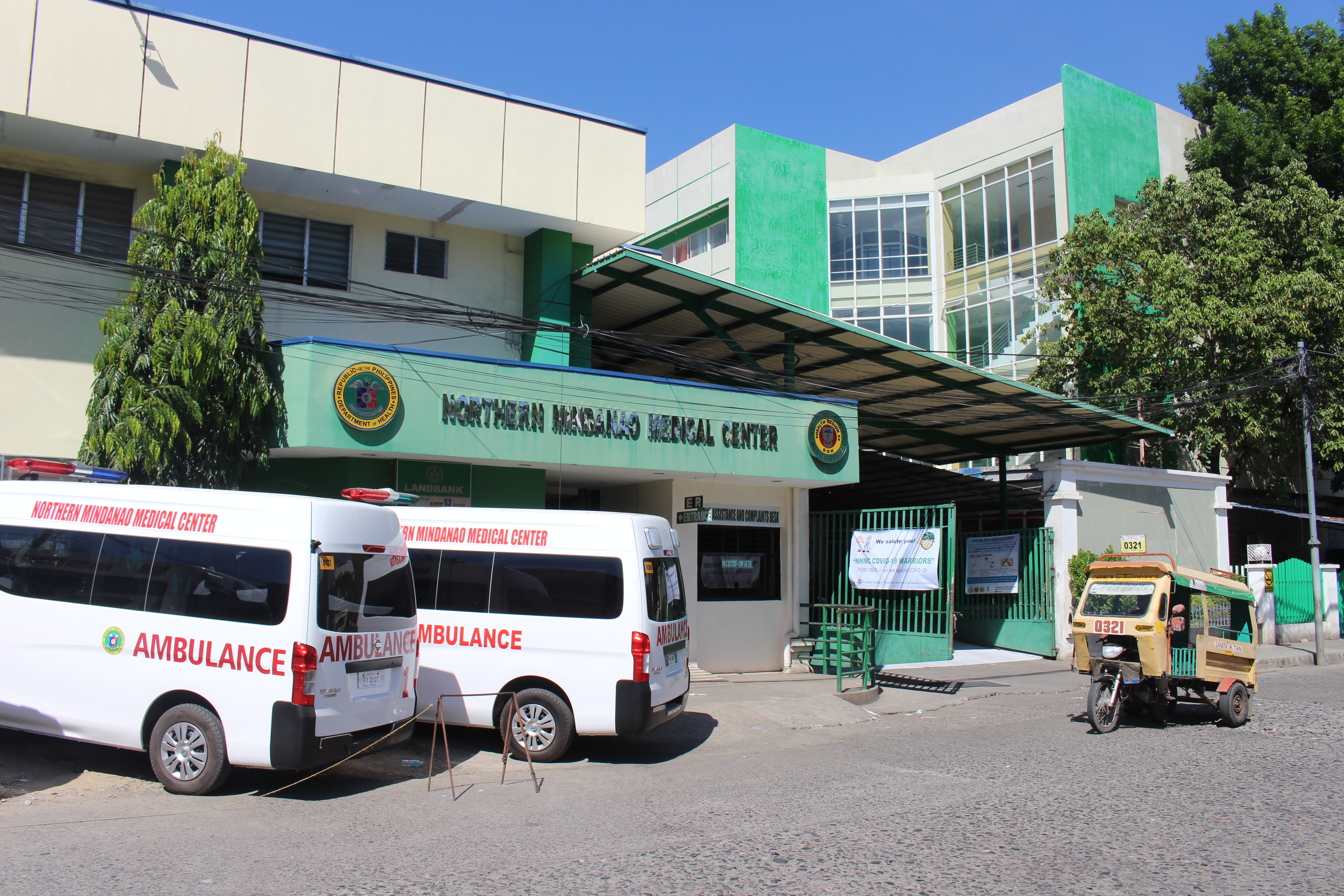

- Location within Mindanao mainland Location within Philippines

Geography
- Location: Cagayan de Oro, Philippines
- Coordinates: 8°29′08″N 124°38′59″E

Services
- Beds: 1200

History
- Former names: Misamis Public Hospital; Misamis Oriental Provincial Hospital; Northern Mindanao Regional Training Hospital

Links
- Website: nmmc.doh.gov.ph

The Northern Mindanao Medical Center (NMMC) is a government hospital in Cagayan de Oro, Philippines. It is managed under the Department of Health.

== History ==
The Northern Mindanao Medical Center was established in the American colonial period in the Philippines in Carmen, Cagayan de Misamis (modern-day Cagayan de Oro). It was initially housed in a wood and nipa structure which was converted from a public schoolhouse as a response to a cholera outbreak. In 1919, the hospital was named the Misamis Public Hospital.

A new wooden building was constructed in 1932 at the present site of the hospital near the Provincial Capitol. The hospital had a 25-bed capacity. The hospital building was destroyed during World War II but was renovated after the war. The bed capacity of the hospital was also expanded to 50.

The hospital was renamed the Misamis Oriental Provincial Hospital in 1945. The hospital was expanded once again in 1956 through the construction of additional buildings and the expansion of the bed capacity to 75.

The Misamis Oriental Provincial Hospital was renamed the Northern Mindanao Regional Training Hospital (NMRTH) through Republic Act 4662 which became law on June 18, 1966. The legislation also mandated the departmentalization of the hospital's services and gave the facility the capability to be a teaching hospital. Bed capacity was also increased to 200.

The Northern Mindanao Community Heart Center, a satellite facility of the Philippine Heart Center was established within the hospital in 1983.

On March 11, 1995, the Republic Act 7938 took effect reclassifying the NMRTH as a medical center and renaming the hospital as the Northern Mindanao Medical Center (NMMC). It also increased the authorized bed capacity from 300 to 600.

During the COVID-19 pandemic in the Philippines, the NMMC served as the COVID-19 dedicated referral facility for patients in Northern Mindanao.

On May 5, 2022, the hospital's authorized bed capacity was increased from 600 to 1200 through Republic Act 11716.
