= Research Institute for Tropical Medicine =

Health research facility in Muntinlupa, Philippines

- Surian sa Pananaliksik ng Medisinang Tropikal (Filipino)

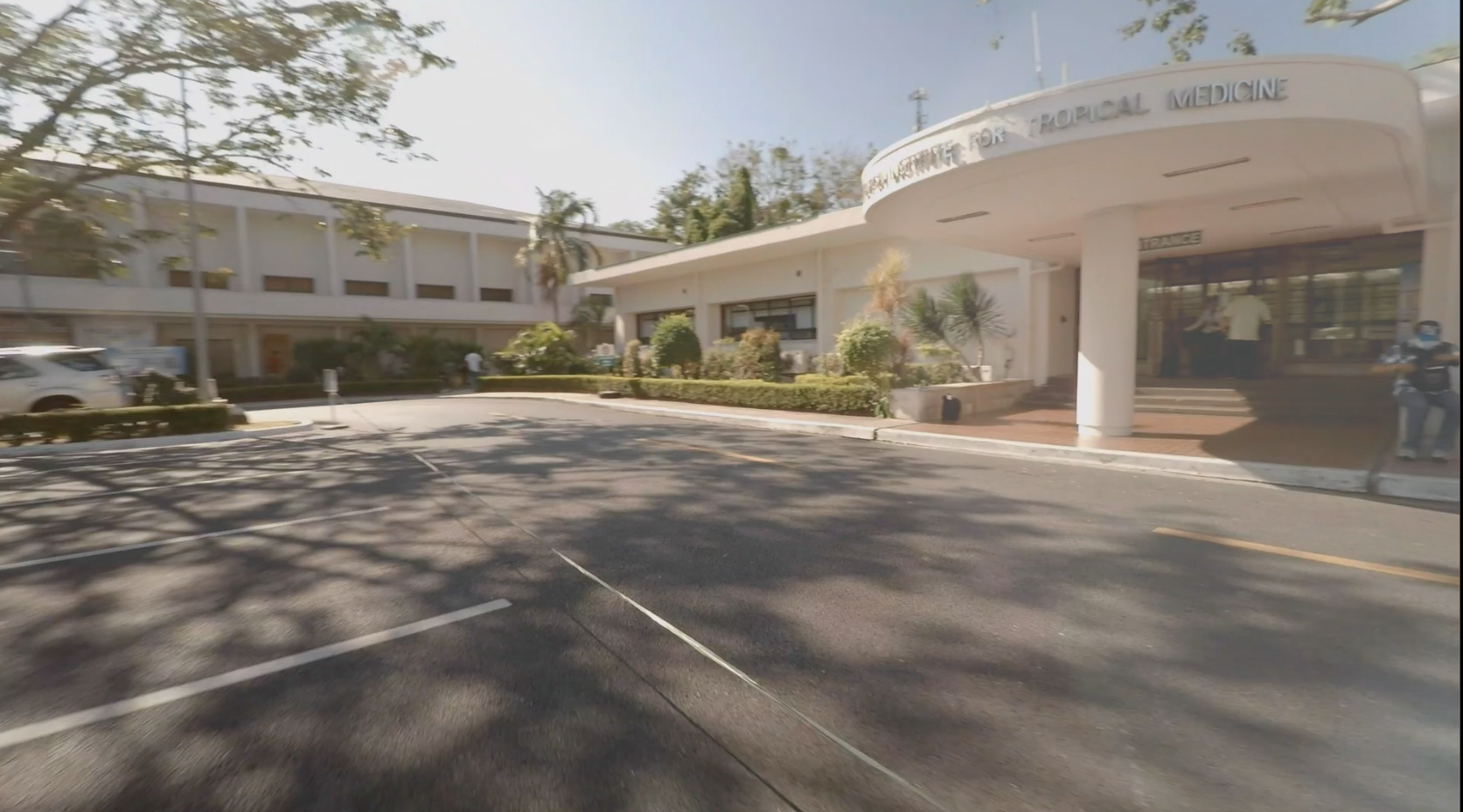
- Main building in 2015
- Established: April 23, 1981; 45 years ago
- Field of research: Tropical disease
- Director: Ana Liza Hombrado-Duran
- Location: 9002 Research Drive, Filinvest Corporate City, Alabang, Muntinlupa, Philippines; 14°24′35″N 121°02′13″E
- Operating agency: Department of Health
- Website: ritm.gov.ph
- Location within Metro Manila Location within Luzon Location within Philippines

The Research Institute for Tropical Medicine (RITM; Filipino: Surian sa Pananaliksik ng Medisinang Tropikal) is a health research facility based in Muntinlupa, Philippines.

== Organization ==
The Research Institute for Tropical Medicine is headed by a director, and is organized into five divisions - Laboratory Research, Clinical Research, Biologicals Manufacturing, Administration, and Finance.

== Location ==
The Research Institute for Tropical Medicine is located in what is now Filinvest City, a central business district in Alabang, Muntinlupa. The site was originally part of the Bureau of Research and Laboratories (BRL) compound of the Philippines' Ministry of Health (now the Department of Health (Philippines)). The RITM was incorporated into the new "Filinvest Corporate City" when the latter was established as a business district in 1995.

== Institute functions ==
The RITM is tasked by the Philippine Department of Health and the Philippine Government to supervise, plan, and successfully implement research programs to prevent and to control prevailing infectious and tropical diseases in the Philippines. This includes research involving the advancement of vaccines and medications used by medical professionals, such as physicians, nurses, and medical technologists, that they utilize whenever patients they handle are under the diagnosis and treatment of infectious and treatable and curable diseases. The institute also trains medical and health workers in order to be further educated in their fields in relation to the management of tropical infectious diseases. Formulation of plans and research projects involving biological products proposed and currently utilized by the Philippine Department of Health are also covered by the functions of the Research Institute for Tropical Medicine, including the manufacture of biologic products and vaccines.

== History ==
=== Establishment ===
==== 1964 Philippine-Japan Joint Commission on Cholera Research ====
The origins of the Research Institute for Tropical Medicine began in 1964 when a Philippine-Japan Joint Commission on Cholera Research was first established during the Diosdado Macapagal administration - the beginning of a cooperation which eventually evolved into the RITM. This cooperation initially began as a tripartite initiative between Japan, the Philippines, and the World bank, and then evolved into a bilateral arrangement between Japan and the Philippines. After the successful conclusion of this engagement, talks about expanding the collaboration between the two countries to cover tropical diseases more broadly began in earnest.

==== 1981 JICA grant-in-aid agreement ====
By the early 1980s, negotiations between "mutually interested parties" within the governments of the Philippines and Japan had been going on for several years, and reached finally reached a breakthrough in 1981 in the form of a grant-in-aid agreement under the Japan International Cooperation Agency (JICA).

==== 1981 Construction in Alabang ====
With the help of this Japanese grant, a US$8 million facility was constructed within the Ministry of Health's Bureau of Research and Laboratories compound in Alabang, Muntinlupa.

With the construction already well underway, Malacanang then issued Executive Order (EO) 674 on March 25, 1981, formally authorizing the Philippine Ministry of Health to establish a research facility to implement a basic and applied research program for tropical medicine in the Philippines, pushing both for health advancement and for medical research.

The facility, which included an 80-bed hospital with an Intensive Care Unit and operating rooms, was inaugurated on April 23, 1981.

=== Marcos era issues ===
Throughout the Marcos administration, the RITM was heavily dependent on Japanese government funding for its continued operations with JICA providing about US$1 million (approx ₱18 million) from 1981 to 1984, and providing another ₱3.2 million in equipment in 1985, when the year RITM's experimental animal laboratory was established. By contrast, the administration's budget allocated the RITM an average of about ₱7 million annually from 1981 to 1985, largely for basic operating expenses and personnel services. The institution was also renamed, having originally been proposed as the "Philippine Japan Research Institute for Tropical Diseases."

The institute's output was criticised in underground publications during the martial law regime because its research findings were not being released in the Philippines, and were instead only being submitted to JICA to satisfy grant requirements, given that the majority of the patients it served were research patients, while the Philippine health system had an overwhelming need to meet basic health services.

The institute thus became associated with the administration's supposed "edifice complex" - propaganda projects designed to be impressive showcases of the administration's achievements but whose actual development impact at the time was questionable. Like many edifice complex projects, RITM was located only in Manila, limiting access to it by citizens from elsewhere on the Philippine archipelago.

==== Marukosu giwaku ====
Criticism of these and similar funding practices which helped prop up of the Marcos regime eventually became known as the Marukosu giwaku (マルコス疑惑), or "Marcos scandal", once the Marcoses were deposed in 1986. The investigation by the Japanese legislature's 1986 session and the resulting reforms eventually brought about the creation of JICA's first ODA Charter in 1992.

=== Post-EDSA reforms ===
The RITM was retained by the Aquino administration, and the various administrations after the 1986 EDSA revolution have continued to work with JICA to improve and expand RITM's services.

==== Research dissemination ====
By 1987, RITM had implemented reforms reflecting the new administration's focus on making sure research is disseminated – launching a companion program to disseminate research results and creating the Office of Public Information Research Dissemination. It also launched a quarterly publication detailing its research findings and news items. Work towards the establishment of an International Training Center was also begun.

==== Increased Philippine government funding ====
After Marcos was deposed in February 1986, the new government began allotting larger budgets to the RITM, with a ₱4.9 million increase in 1986. In the first full budget year after the Marcos administration, the RITM was given ₱5 million more than it had been given in the 1985 budget.

=== Expansion ===
==== Additional research grants (1987) ====
Research grants from the World Health Organization, the National Academy of Sciences (BOSTID), the International Development Research Center, the Australian International Development Assistance Bureau, the Edna McConnel Clark Foundation, Sanofi, and the Philippine Council for Health Research and Development allowed RITM to expand its research beyond their previous focus on diarrheal diseases, acute respiratory infections, and schistosomiasis, and allowed research programs in AIDS, leprosy, hepatitis, dengue, and malaria. A Technical Cooperation Program with JICA allowed RITM to expand the expertise of its staff.

==== Center for Training in Tropical Infectious Diseases (1989) ====
In 1989, the RITM Center for Training in Tropical Infectious Diseases was established.

==== NIH Tropical Medicine Research Center Program (1991) ====
In 1990 the US National Institutes of Health approved a 5-year grant to the RITM for the establishment of a NIH Tropical Medicine Research Center Program in the Philippines, starting in February 1991. This partnership allowed the RITM to collaborate with scientists in Australia and the US on research relating to malaria, leprosy, and schistosomiasis.

==== Merger with the DOH Biologicals Production Service (2000) ====
The Biologicals Production Service of the Department of Health, the vaccine laboratory of the Philippines, was absorbed by the RITM in November 2000

==== Biosafety Level 3 laboratory (2018) ====
The RITM received a Biosafety Level 3 laboratory from the Japanese government in 2018, improving its capacity to conduct research on higher-risk bacteria and viruses.

=== COVID-19 pandemic ===
During the COVID-19 pandemic, the RITM became a site for preliminary testing for suspected cases of SARS-CoV-2 in the Philippines. In the early months of the pandemic in the Philippines, RITM was the only laboratory with the capacity to test COVID-19 cases.

== See also ==
- Infectious disease (medical specialty)
- Medical microbiology
- Tropical medicine
- Tropical nursing
- Rural health
- List of hospitals in the Philippines
