= ECQ =

ECQ may refer to:

- Enhanced community quarantine
  - Enhanced community quarantine in Luzon
- UEFA European Championship qualifying
- Ex contradictione quodlibet, in logic
- Electoral Commission of Queensland, Australia
