= DC Superheroes Cafe =

Restaurant information
- Established: June 23, 2018
- Closed: March 12, 2020
- Chef: Mikel Zaguirre; Kalel Demetrio
- Location: Mandaluyong, Philippines

The DC Superheroes Cafe was a themed restaurant in Mandaluyong, Philippines, inspired by the wide spectrum of films, TV series, animated films, and comic books of DC Comics. Its managing director, Edric Chua, a self-confessed "DC fanboy through and through", brought in Chef Mikel Zaguirre of Locavore and Chef Kalel Demetrio to develop dishes that are inspired by DC characters.

Operated by Almerak Corp., in partnership with Warner Bros. Consumer Products on behalf of DC Entertainment, the cafe was opened to the public on June 23, 2018. It was located on the 4th floor of Mega Fashion Hall, SM Megamall, and was filled with various DC comics, toys, and merchandise that are on display and for sale.

The restaurant closed on March 12, 2020. No exact reason was given for its closure, but incidentally, it was three days before the declaration of the COVID-19 lockdown in the Philippines.
