= Bayanihan to Recover as One Act =

Philippine law

Congress of the Philippines
- Long title: An Act Providing for COVID-19 Response and Recovery Interventions and Providing Mechanisms to Accelerate the Recovery and Bolster the Resiliency of the Philippine Economy, Providing Funds Therefor and For Other Purposes
- Citation: Republic Act No. 11494
- Territorial extent: Philippines
- Passed by: Senate of the Philippines
- Passed: August 20, 2020
- Passed by: House of Representatives of the Philippines
- Passed: August 24, 2020
- Signed by: Rodrigo Duterte
- Signed: September 11, 2020
- Effective: September 15, 2020
- Date of expiry: June 30, 2021

Legislative history

Initiating chamber: Senate of the Philippines
- Bill title: Bayanihan to Recover as One Act
- Bill citation: Senate Bill No. 1564
- Introduced by: Imee Marcos, Sonny Angara, Ralph Recto, et al.
- Introduced: June 1, 2020
- First reading: June 1, 2020
- Second reading: June 3, 2020
- Third reading: July 28, 2020
- Committee report: Committee Report No. 98

Revising chamber: House of Representatives of the Philippines
- Bill title: Bayanihan to Recover as One Act
- Bill citation: House Bill No. 6953
- Received from the Senate of the Philippines: June 3, 2020
- Member(s) in charge: Luis Raymund Villafuerte (Camarines Sur–2nd), Martin Romualdez (Leyte–2nd), et al.
- First reading: June 3, 2020
- Second reading: August 5, 2020
- Third reading: August 10, 2020

Repeals
- Bayanihan to Heal as One Act
- Status: Expired

The Bayanihan to Recover as One Act, also known as Bayanihan 2, and officially designated as Republic Act No. 11494, is a law in the Philippines that was enacted in September 2020 granting the President additional authority to combat the COVID-19 pandemic in the Philippines.

== Background ==
Prior to the expiration of the Bayanihan to Heal as One Act, Congress has already been deliberating proposals to either amend the existing law or legislate a new law that would handle the economic impact of the pandemic in the country.

== Legislative history ==
In the Senate, the bill was introduced as Senate Bill No. 1564 with Senators Imee Marcos, Sonny Angara, Ralph Recto, Migz Zubiri, Pia Cayetano, Cynthia Villar and Senate President Tito Sotto as its principal sponsors.

On June 3, the House of Representatives adapted the Senate's version of the bill and was introduced as House Bill No. 6953 with Deputy Speaker Luis Raymund Villafuerte of Camarines Sur's 2nd district and Martin Romualdez of Leyte's 2nd district as its principal sponsors.

The final draft of the bill is a consolidation of bills filed by the bicameral Congress.

== Provisions ==
The act will provide government funds to stimulate the economy while strengthening the health sector and the government's pandemic responses.

== Supreme Court decision ==
The Supreme Court, in a decision dated December 7, 2021 and only publicized in September 2022, declared unconstitutional two subsections which imposed new taxes on Philippine Offshore Gaming Operator licensees: Section 11(f) (5% franchise tax on gaming operations) and Section 11(g) (taxes on non-gaming operations, including income and VAT). The court noted that POGOs are not liable for taxes prior to the enactment of Republic Act No. 11590 in September 2021.

== See also ==
- List of COVID-19 pandemic legislation
- Philippine government response to the COVID-19 pandemic
