= Bayanihan to Heal as One Act =

Philippine law

Congress of the Philippines
- Long title: An Act Declaring the Existence of a National Emergency Arising from the Coronavirus Disease 2019 (COVID-19) Situation and a National Policy in Connection Therewith, and Authorizing the President of the Republic of the Philippines for a Limited Period and Subject to Restrictions, to Exercise Powers Necessary and Proper to Carry Out the Declared National Policy and for Other Purposes
- Citation: Republic Act No. 11469
- Territorial extent: Philippines
- Passed by: Senate of the Philippines
- Passed: March 23, 2020
- Passed by: House of Representatives of the Philippines
- Passed: March 23, 2020
- Signed by: Rodrigo Duterte
- Signed: March 24, 2020
- Effective: March 25, 2020
- Date of expiry: June 24, 2020

Legislative history

Initiating chamber: Senate of the Philippines
- Bill title: Bayanihan To Heal As One Act
- Bill citation: Senate Bill No. 1418
- Introduced by: Tito Sotto, Pia Cayetano, Win Gatchalian, et al.
- Introduced: March 23, 2020
- First reading: March 23, 2020
- Second reading: March 23, 2020
- Third reading: March 23, 2020
- Committee report: Committee Report No. 70

Revising chamber: House of Representatives of the Philippines
- Bill title: We Heal As One Act of 2020
- Bill citation: House Bill No. 6616
- Received from the Senate of the Philippines: March 23, 2020
- Member(s) in charge: Alan Peter Cayetano (Pateros–Taguig), et al.
- First reading: March 23, 2020
- Second reading: March 23, 2020
- Third reading: March 23, 2020
- Status: Expired

The Bayanihan to Heal as One Act, also known as the Bayanihan Act, and officially designated as Republic Act No. 11469, is a law in the Philippines that was enacted in March 2020 granting the President additional authority to combat the COVID-19 pandemic in the Philippines. The word "bayanihan" is a Tagalog word for communal work.

== Background ==
Following the sharp increase of COVID-19 cases in the country, Congress held a special session on March 23 to deliberate and pass the Bayanihan to Heal as One Act. The act would allow President Rodrigo Duterte to "reallocate, realign, and reprogram" a budget of almost ₱275 billion ($5.37 billion) from the estimated ₱438 billion ($8.55 billion) national budget approved for 2020, in response to the pandemic; enable him to "temporarily take over or direct the operations" of public utilities and privately owned health facilities and other necessary facilities "when the public interest so requires" for quarantine, the accommodation of health professionals, and the distribution and storage of medical relief; and "facilitate and streamline" the accreditation of testing kits.

== Legislative history ==
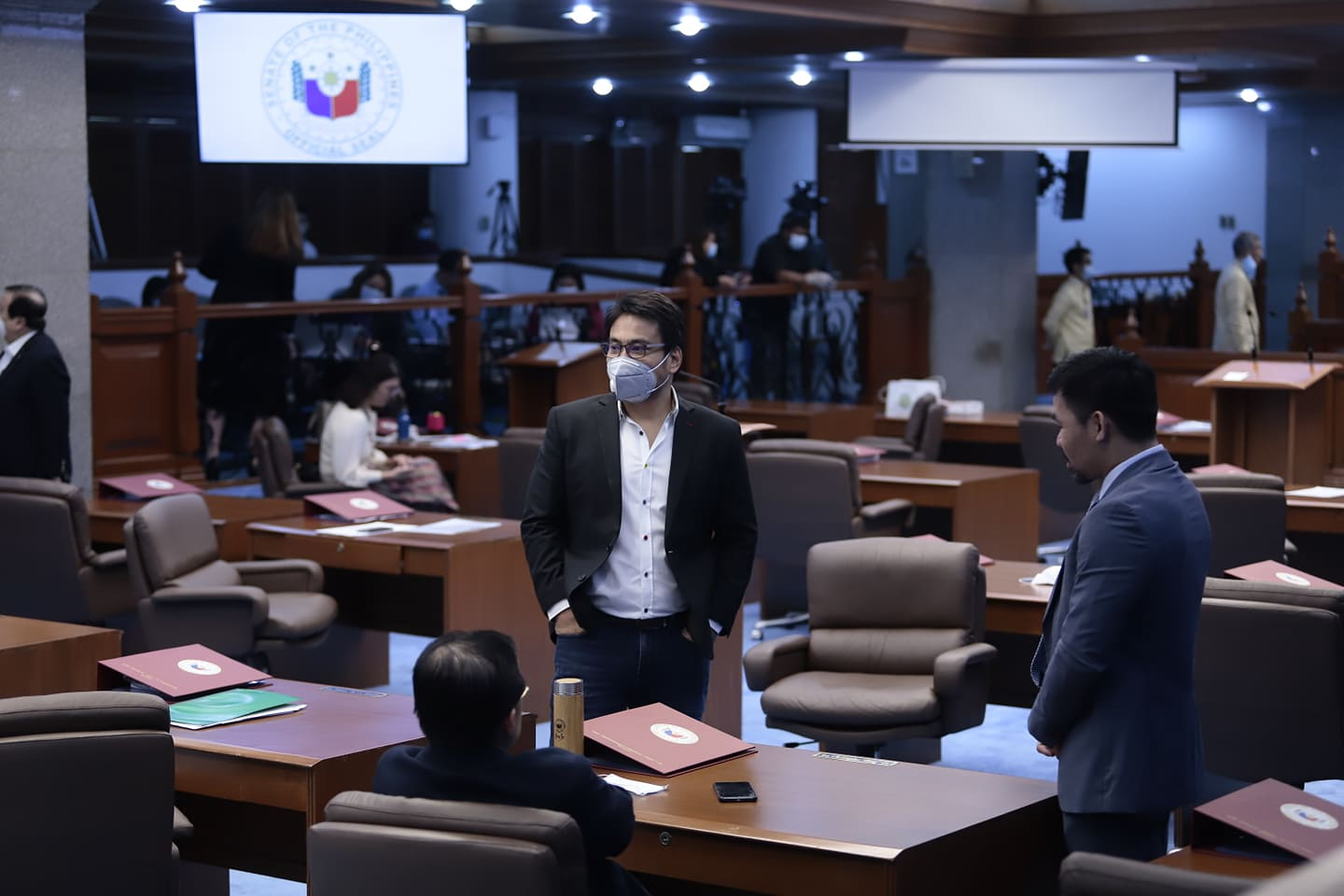
Senators during a special session to tackle the passage of the Bayanihan to Heal as One Act, March 23, 2020

In the House of Representatives, the bill was introduced as House Bill No. 6616 with House Speaker Alan Peter Cayetano of Pateros–Taguig as its principal sponsor and was defended on the floor by Deputy Speaker Luis Raymund Villafuerte of Camarines Sur's 2nd district. Executive Secretary Salvador Medialdea addressed the session, stressing that the president needed "standby powers" to address the emergency. Some representatives questioned the nature, usage, and necessity of the "standby powers", claiming its susceptibility to abuse and corruption.

In the Senate of the Philippines, the bill was introduced as Senate Bill No. 1418 with Senate President Tito Sotto and Senator Pia Cayetano as its principal sponsors. Under the bill, Senator Cayetano said that over 18 million Filipino households living below the poverty line would also receive financial incentives of around ₱5,000–8,000 ($97.45–155.92) per month for two months. Senators amended their version of the bill to include financial compensation of around ₱100,000 ($1,965.33) to be given by PhilHealth to health professionals who contracted the virus, as well as the provision of around ₱1 million-worth ($19,653.27) of financial aid to their families.

Both versions of the bill reportedly removed the usage of the term "emergency powers", replacing it with "authority". It also removed the term "take over of public utilities and private businesses", limiting President Duterte's abilities at most to "direct the operations" of such enterprises. The House version of the bill passed the House of Representatives in a 284–9 vote without abstentions, while its Senate version unanimously passed the Senate. President Duterte signed the bill into law the following day on March 24, 2020.

=== Manila paper backlash ===
At the start of the special session at the House of Representatives, House Speaker Alan Peter Cayetano along with his fellow congresspeople, did a photo op showing Cayetano and Executive Secretary Salvador Medialdea holding up a board covered with Manila paper with the message, "Together with doctors and frontliners, we went to work for you, so please stay home for us." This prompted an online backlash on social media with citizens criticizing the lawmakers for comparing themselves with the pandemic healthcare frontliners. The photo also became fodder for memes with people replacing the Manila paper message with various images. Cayetano responded to the backlash saying, "If you ask me to hold up a sign again, and even if the sign curses at me but it gets people to read and gets people to stay home, I will do it again and again and again."

=== Expiration and extension ===
The law expired on June 24, 2020, without a resolution of it being extended. Although there were bills passed in Congress to extend the law until September 2020, the president did not certify these as urgent, prompting the bills to lapse.

The distribution of the social amelioration program (SAP) and other cash aids from the Philippine government were not affected by the expiration of the law.

The Bayanihan to Recover as One Bill, was filed on June 1, 2020.

== Provisions ==
The law provides the President of the Philippines the power to implement temporary emergency measures to respond to the crisis brought about by COVID-19, such as:

- adopting and implementing measures, which are based on World Health Organization guidelines and best practices, to prevent or suppress further transmission and spread of COVID-19 through education, detection, protection and treatment;
- hastening the accreditation of testing kits;
- facilitating prompt testing of patients under investigation (PUIs) and persons under monitoring (PUMs) as well as the immediate mandatory isolation and treatment of patients, the cost of which shall be covered by the National Health Insurance Program of the Philippine Health Insurance Corporation;
- providing an emergency subsidy amounting to five thousand pesos (₱5,000.00) to eight thousand pesos (₱8,000.00) to low income households based on prevailing regional minimum wage rates;
- providing all public health workers with "COVID-19 special risk allowance";
- directing the Philippine Health Insurance Corporation to shoulder all medical expenses of public and private health workers related to exposure to COVID-19 or any work-related injury or disease during the pandemic emergency;
- providing a compensation of one hundred thousand pesos (₱100,000.00) to public and private health workers who contract severe COVID-19 infection while performing their duties and a compensation amounting to one million pesos (₱1,000,000.00) shall be given to public and private health workers who will die because of COVID-19;
- ensuring that all local government units adhere to all the rules, regulations and directives issued by the national government with respect to this law as well as implement community quarantine consistent with the standards the national government has laid down;
- directing the operation of any privately owned hospitals, medical and health facilities and other establishments to house health workers, serve as quarantine areas and centers, medical relief, aid distribution locations and temporary medical facilities provided that the management and operation of these establishments or facilities shall still be with the owners, however, unjustifiable refusal of the establishment or the facility to operate for this purpose may mean take over of the President of the Philippines on the operations of this establishment or facility with the limitations and safeguards stated in the Constitution;
- directing public transportation to ferry health, emergency and frontline personnel as well as other individuals provided that the management and operation of this enterprise shall still be with the owner, however, unjustifiable refusal of the enterprise to operate for this purpose may mean take over of the President of the Philippines on the operations of this enterprise with the limitations and safeguards stated in the Constitution;
- enforcing measures against hoarding, profiteering, injurious speculations, manipulation of prices, product deceptions, cartels, monopolies or other combinations to restraint trade or affect the supply, distribution and movement of food, clothing, hygiene and sanitation products, medicine and medical supplies, fuel, fertilizers, chemicals, building materials, implements, machinery equipment and spare parts for agriculture, industry and other essential services;
- ensuring that donation, acceptance and distribution of health products for COVID-19 public health emergency are not unnecessarily delayed;
- procuring of medical goods, equipment and supplies to be allocated and distributed to public health facilities that are designated as COVID-19 referral hospitals, private hospitals that are capable of providing support care and treatment to COVID-19 patients and public and private laboratories that are capable of testing suspected COVID-19 patients, in the most expeditious manner through exemptions from Republic Act No. 9184 or the "Government Procurement Reform Act" and other relevant laws;
- procuring of goods and services for social amelioration measures, in the most expeditious manner through exemptions from Republic Act No. 9184 or the "Government Procurement Reform Act" and other relevant laws;
- leasing of real property or venue for use to house or serve as quarantine centers, medical relief and aid distribution locations or temporary medical facilities, in the most expeditious manner through exemptions from Republic Act No. 9184 or the "Government Procurement Reform Act" and other relevant laws;
- partnering with the Philippine Red Cross in giving aid to the people;
- hiring temporary Human Resources for Health (HRH), who shall receive appropriate compensation, allowances and hazard duty pay, to complement or supplement the current health workforce or to man the temporary medical facilities;
- ensuring availability of credit especially in the countryside by lowering the effective lending rates of interest and reserve requirements of lending institutions;
- liberalizing the grant of incentives for the manufacture or importation of critical or needed equipment or supplies for carrying out of the policy of this law provided that importation shall be exempt from import duties, taxes and other fees;
- ensuring the availability of essential goods by adopting necessary measures to facilitate and/or minimize disruption to the supply chain;
- regulating and limiting operation of private or public transportation whether land, sea or air;
- conserving, regulating the distribution and use as well as ensuring the adequate supply of power, fuel, energy and water;
- moving statutory deadlines and timelines for filing and submission of any document, payment of taxes, fees and other charges required by law;
- directing all private and public banks, quasi-banks, financing companies, lending companies and other financial institutions, including the Government Service Insurance System, Social Security System and Pag-ibig Fund to implement a grace period of 30 days, minimum, for the payment of all loans falling due within the enhanced community quarantine without interests, penalties, fees or other charges;
- providing for a minimum of 30 days grace period on residential rents falling due within the period of the enhanced community quarantine without interest, penalties, fees and other charges;
- implementing an expanded and enhanced Pantawid Pamilya Pilipino Program and providing an assistance program through the Department of Social Welfare and Development and the Department of Labor and Employment; and
- lifting the 30% cap on the amount for the quick respond fund as provided for in Republic Act No. 10121 or the "Philippine Disaster Risk Reduction and Management Act of 2010" during the state of national emergency due to COVID-19.

The President of the Philippines shall submit a weekly report to Congress, every Monday, of all acts done for this law including the amount and corresponding utilization of funds. The Congress shall form a Joint Congressional Oversight Committee consisting of four members each from the Senate and the House of Representatives who are appointed by the Senate President and the House Speaker.

Under this law, a penalty of two months imprisonment or a fine of not less than ten thousand pesos (₱10,000.00) but not more than one million pesos (₱1,000,000.00) or both shall be meted to offenses such as:

- disobeying national government policies or directives in imposing quarantines by officials of local government units;
- refusing unjustifiably to operate the privately owned hospitals, medical and health facilities pursuant to the directive of the President by owners and possessors of these hospitals, medical and health facilities;
- engaging in profiteering, hoarding, injurious speculations, manipulation of prices, product deceptions, cartels, monopolies or other combinations to restraint trade, distribution and movement of food, clothing, hygiene and sanitation products, medicine and medical supplies, fuel, fertilizers, chemicals, building materials, implements, machinery equipment and spare parts for agriculture, industry and other essential services and other articles of prime necessity, whether locally manufactured or imported;
- refusal to prioritize and accept contracts for services and materials necessary to promote national policy provided in this law;
- refusal to give 30-day grace period as provided by this law;
- creating, perpetrating or spreading false information about COVID-19 crisis on social media and other platforms, with no valid or beneficial effect on the population which promote chaos, panic, anarchy, fear or confusion;
- participating in cyber incidents that take advantage of the COVID-19 crisis such as scams, phishing, fraudulent emails or other similar acts;
- failure to comply with reasonable limitations on the operation of certain transportation sectors, be it private or public, whether by land, air or sea; and
- putting-up of prohibited encroachments or obstacles, maintenance of illegal constructions in public places that have been ordered to be removed and impeding access to roads, streets and bridges.

== Implementation ==
=== NBI summons Mayor Sotto ===
After the imposition of the enhanced community quarantine in Luzon and before the enactment of the Bayanihan law, Pasig Mayor Vico Sotto allowed temporarily the limited operation of the city's tricycles for use of health care workers, government personnel and patients despite the national government's ban on the operation of public transportation. Sotto mentioned that banning all tricycles in the city would bring more risk to the city's health situation. After he aired the views and experiences of the local government of Pasig, Sotto complied with the inclusion of tricycles in the public transportation ban.

The National Bureau of Investigation (NBI), through its Deputy Director Ferdinand Lavin, confirmed on April 1, 2020, that NBI sent an invitation letter to Sotto for violation of Bayanihan to Heal as One Act. Lavin said that Sotto is scheduled to appear at the bureau on April 7, 2020, at 10 am. Sotto responded by saying that he had already complied with the national government's order to stop tricycle operations prior to the implementation of the law. Senate President Tito Sotto, an uncle of the mayor, criticized the move in a tweet, stating "NBI will be well advised to be cautious in their interpretation of the law I principally authored. Any so-called violation of RA 11469 can't be retroactive!". Liberal Party president and Senator Francis Pangilinan also questioned the NBI's actions, stating the unconstitutionality of criminalizing an act committed before the law was passed.

Social media responded heavily with criticism towards the NBI for allegedly singling out the mayor, even comparing the situation to that of Senator Koko Pimentel's case, who had violated quarantine protocols a few days prior at the Makati Medical Center, but was given consideration by the government.

=== NBI investigates Senator Pimentel III ===
The National Bureau of Investigation (NBI) spokesperson Deputy Director Ferdinand Lavin said that the bureau was also investigating Senator Aquilino Pimentel III for alleged violation of the Bayanihan Heal as One Act. Director Eric Distor of the NBI confirmed that Pimentel would also be invited to the bureau to explain. He would be summoned when his self-quarantine ended.

Pimentel had undergone testing for COVID-19 and was informed that he was positive for the disease while he was at the Makati Medical Center, accompanying his pregnant wife who was scheduled to give birth.

== See also ==
- List of COVID-19 pandemic legislation
- Philippine government response to the COVID-19 pandemic
