= Enhanced community quarantine in Luzon =

Quarantine in Luzon during the COVID-19 pandemic

- Part of COVID-19 community quarantines in the Philippines
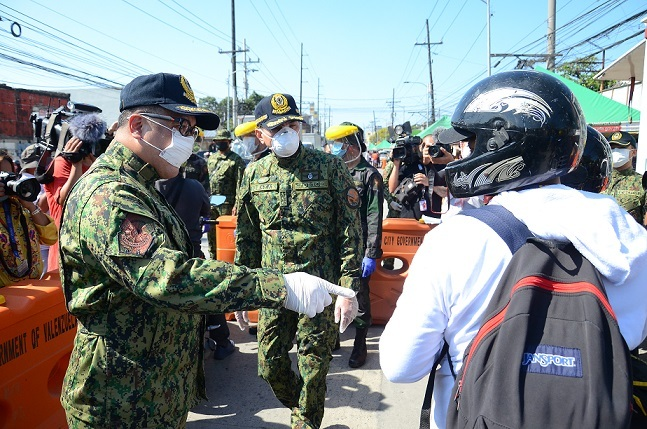
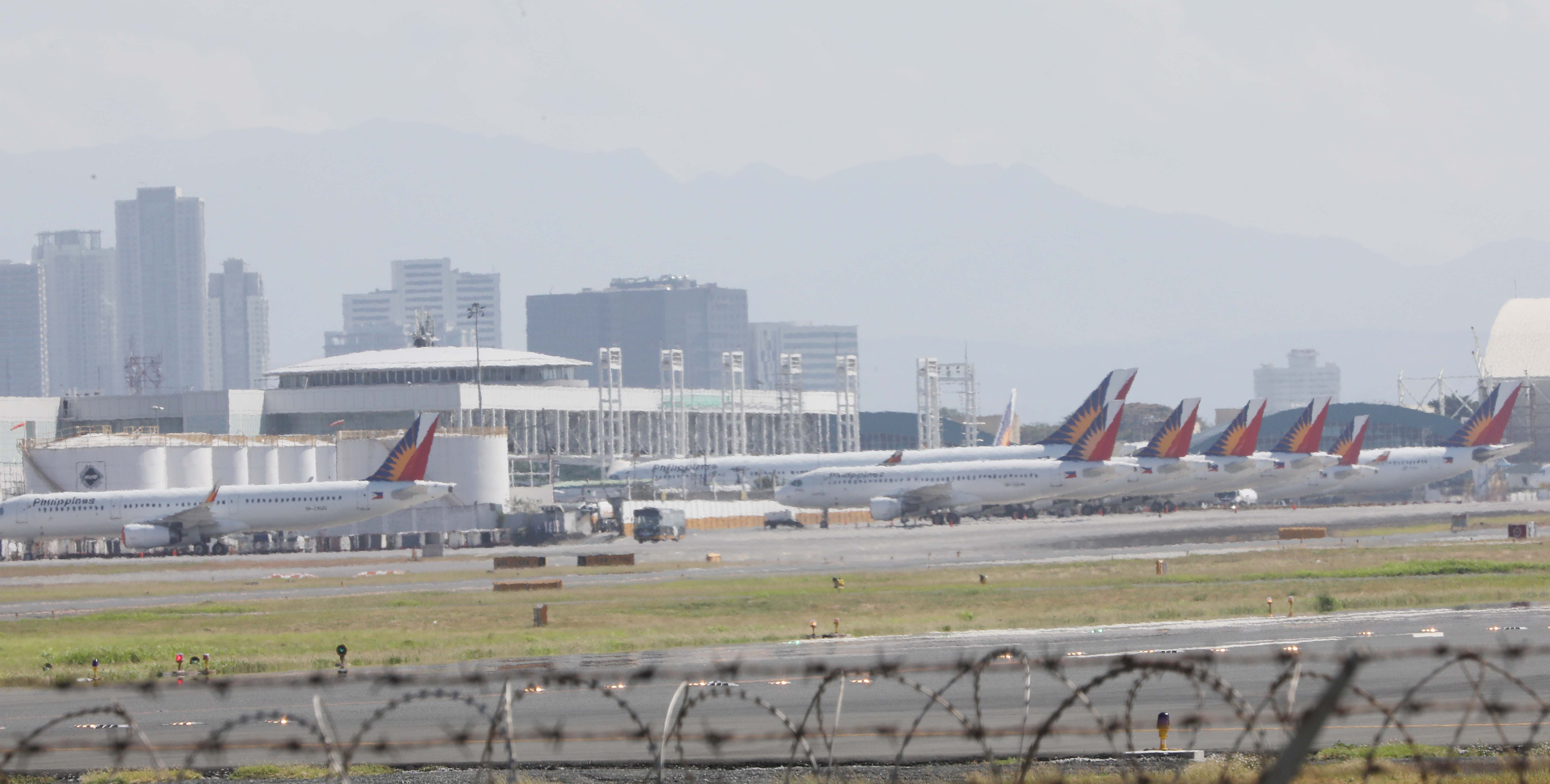
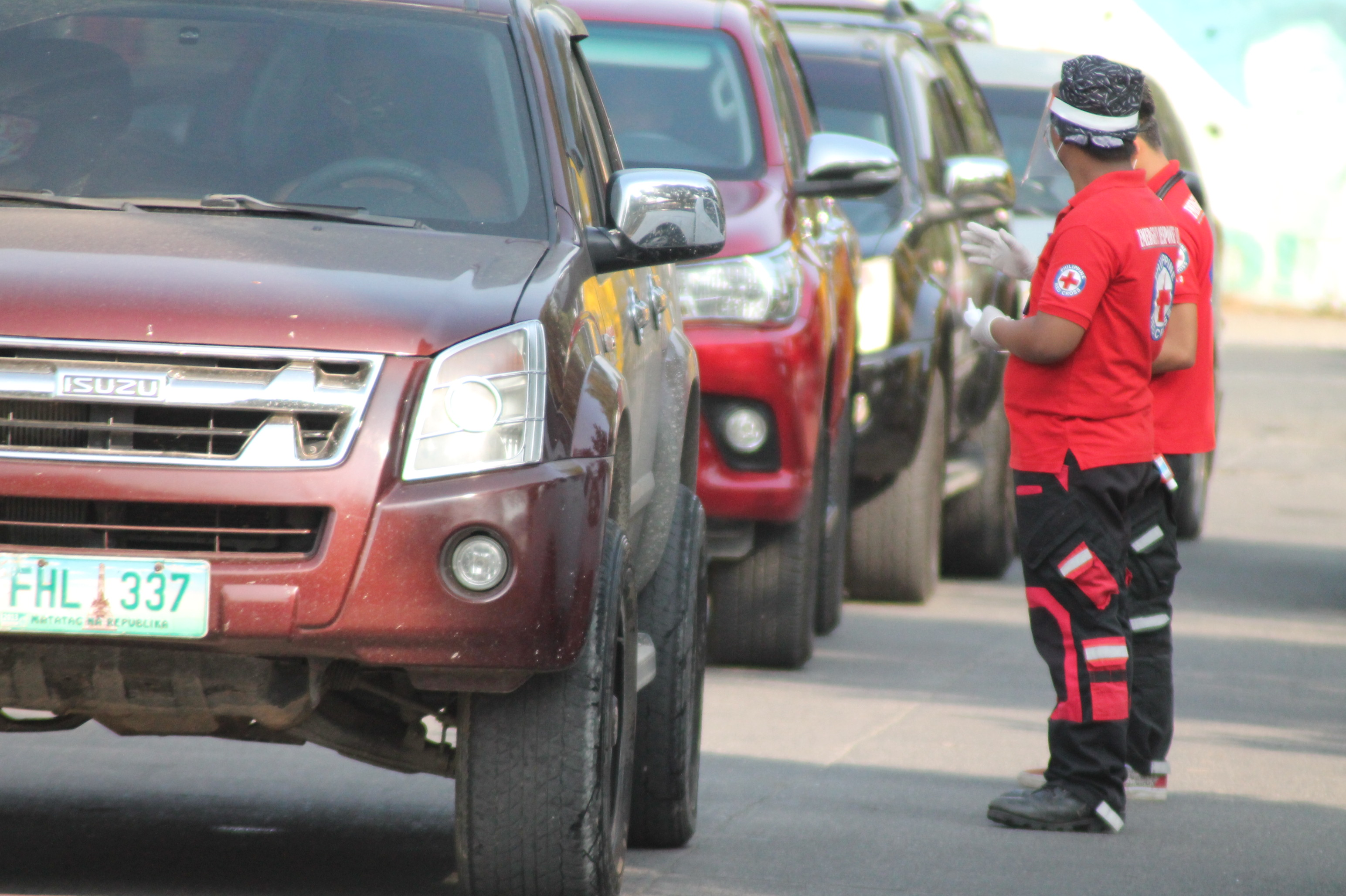
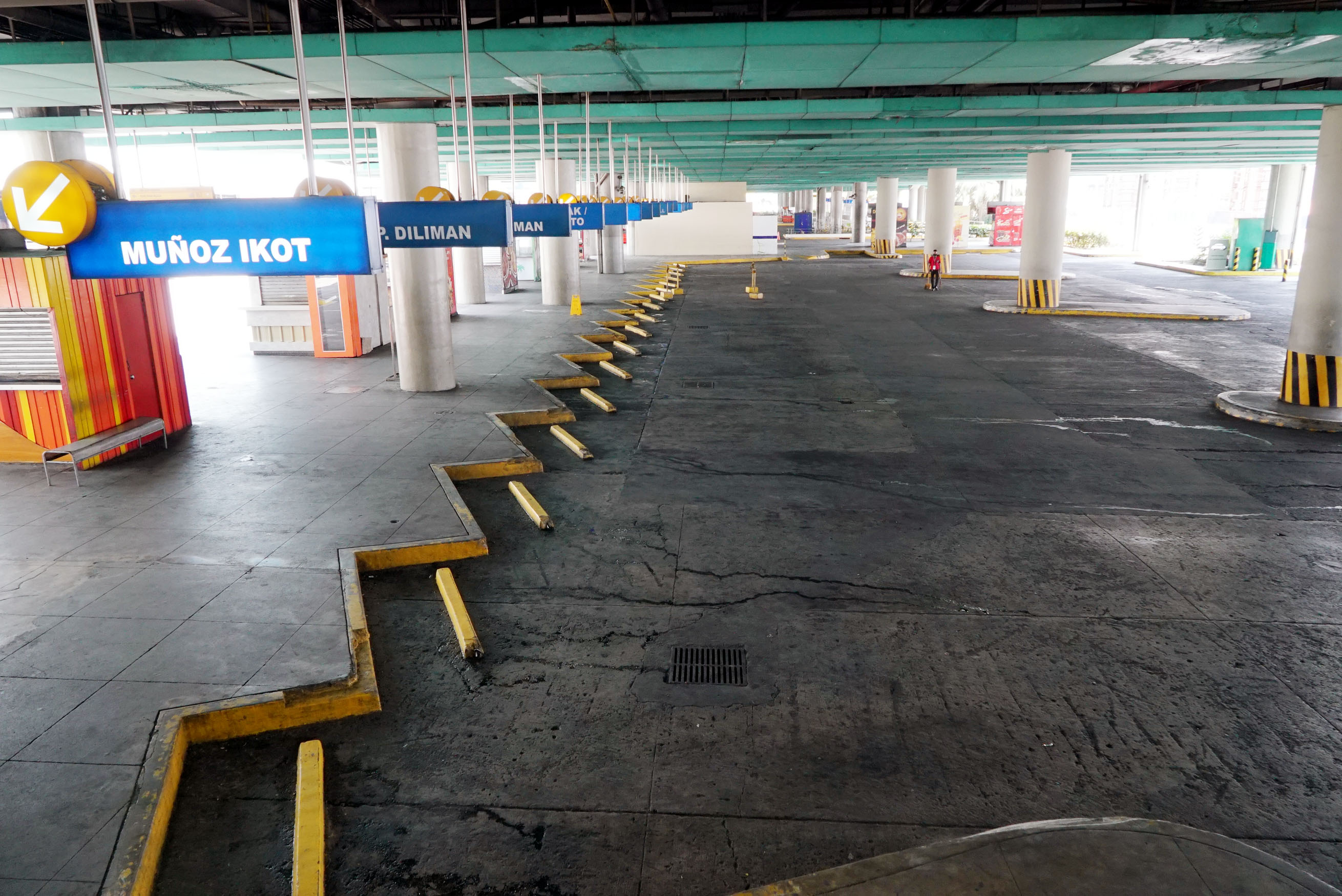
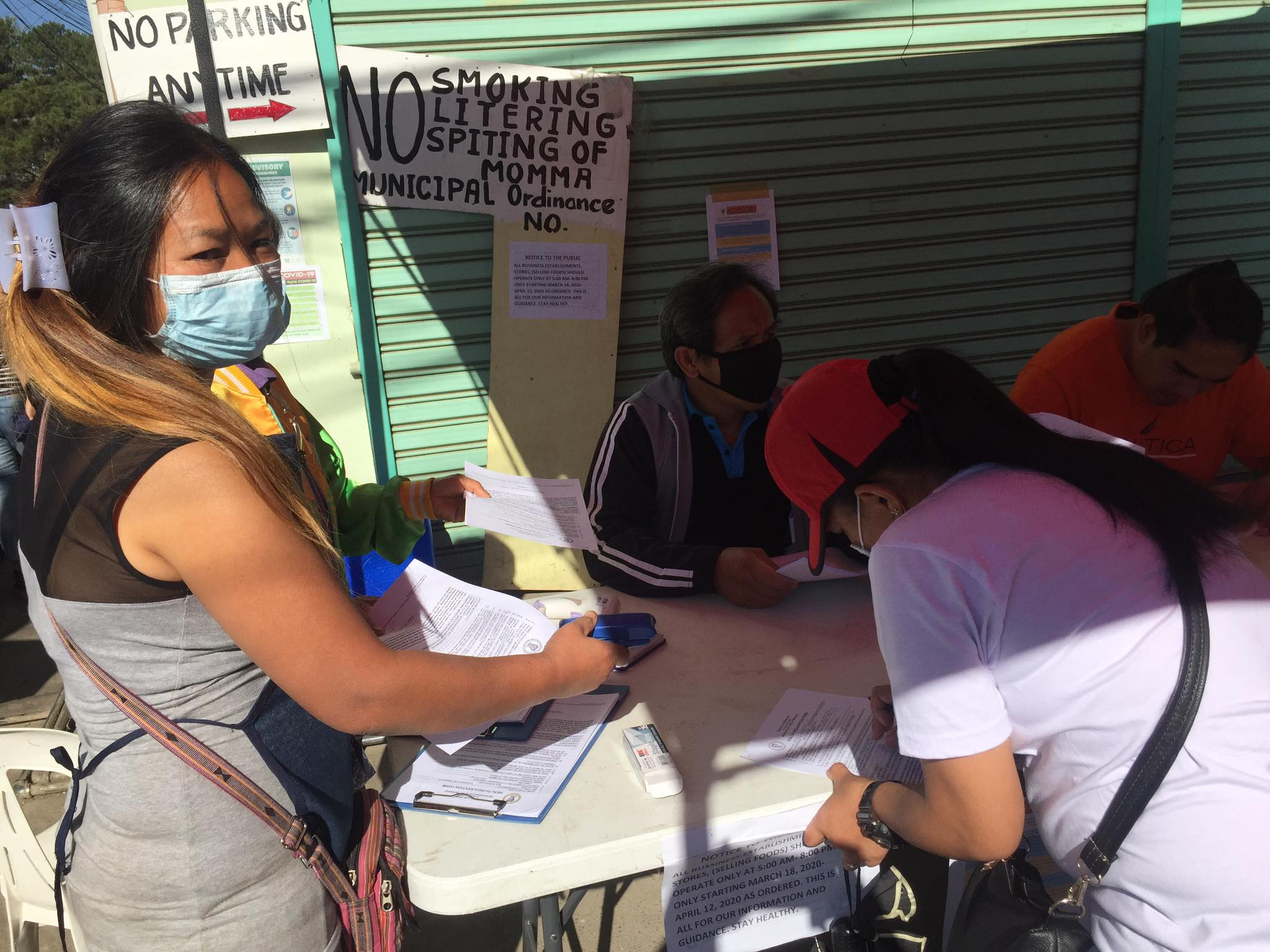
- (clockwise from top): PNP checkpoint near the Valenzuela–Meycauayan boundary; Thermal scanning in Nueva Vizcaya; Documentary procedures for entering La Trinidad; Empty SM North EDSA transport terminal; Grounded planes due to halted operations
- Date: March 17, 2020 – May 31, 2020 (Note: The lockdown started as a community quarantine in Metro Manila, which was originally scheduled from March 15 to April 14 but later expanded to the rest of Luzon as an enhanced community quarantine two days later. The Luzon ECQ was originally scheduled to end on April 12 but later extended to April 30, and then again to May 15 but in certain areas only. It was further extended until May 31 with less strict restrictions in Metro Manila, Laguna, Bataan, Bulacan, Nueva Ecija, Pampanga (including Angeles City), and Zambales and was called modified enhanced community quarantine (MECQ). Starting June 1, the lockdown in Metro Manila and other areas in Luzon were downgraded to a general community quarantine (GCQ).) (2 months and 14 days); August 4, 2020 – August 18, 2020 (Note: An MECQ was reimposed in Metro Manila, Bulacan, Cavite, Laguna, and Rizal from August 4 to 18, 2020 due to a rise in COVID-19 cases during that time.) (14 days); January 25, 2021 – February 15, 2021 (Note: An ECQ was reimposed in Tabuk, while an MECQ was imposed on a number of municipalities in the Kalinga province.) (21 days); March 29, 2021 – September 15, 2021 (Note: The Greater Manila Area was placed under ECQ until April 11 and was loosened to MECQ until May 14. An MECQ was placed in Santiago, Isabela, Quirino, Abra, and Ifugao until May 31.) (5 months and 17 days)
- Location: Luzon, Philippines, including its associated islands (Note: Implementation has been localized since April 30, 2020.)
- Caused by: COVID-19 pandemic in the Philippines
- Goals: To contain the COVID-19 pandemic in Luzon.
- Methods: Checkpoints, banning of public events, business and school closures, social distancing, among others.
- Result: About 57 million people quarantined (all of Luzon) until April 30, 2020; Lockdown measures loosened to GCQ and MGCQ status starting June 1, 2020

The enhanced community quarantine in Luzon was a series of stay-at-home orders and cordon sanitaire measures implemented by the Inter-Agency Task Force for the Management of Emerging Infectious Diseases (IATF-EID) on the island of Luzon and its associated islands. It is part of the COVID-19 community quarantines in the Philippines, a larger scale of COVID-19 containment measures with varying degrees of strictness. The "enhanced community quarantine" (ECQ) is the strictest of these measures and is effectively a total lockdown.

There were three instances of the ECQ being implemented in Luzon. The first ECQ and first MECQ were implemented between March 17 and May 31, 2020. This was announced on March 16, two days after the government of the Philippines under Rodrigo Duterte placed Metro Manila under a "community quarantine" on March 14. It was implemented throughout Luzon from March 17 until May 15, and remained in areas with a moderate to high risk of infection until May 31. New degrees such as "modified enhanced community quarantine" (MECQ) and "general community quarantine" (GCQ) were introduced by the IATF-EID during the month of May as easing restrictions commenced, until all restrictions under ECQ and MECQ were downgraded to GCQ and "modified general community quarantine" (MGCQ) on June 1.

After two months of a relaxed GCQ status, a second MECQ was reimplemented in Metro Manila and its immediate surrounding provinces on August 4 and was lifted on August 18. Finally, on January 24, 2021, a second ECQ was restored in Tabuk while an MECQ was raised in four more municipalities in Kalinga. It was lifted on February 15. Due to a spike in COVID cases, especially in the Greater Manila Area, a third ECQ was reimplemented for the Holy Week starting on March 29 until April 4, which was since extended until April 11, 2021.

The ECQ affected around 57 million people in Luzon during its peak. It also resulted in the mobilization of the national and local governments, with the Bayanihan to Heal as One Act passed to combat the epidemic. The effectiveness of the ECQ implementation was noted by a study made by the University of the Philippines, although there were also several documented cases of violations of ECQ regulations. Authorities then pushed for stricter enforcement, which in turn raised concerns of human rights violations.

== Background ==
Following the outbreak of coronavirus disease 2019 (COVID-19) which started in Wuhan, Hubei, China, the Philippine government confirmed the country's first case of the disease on January 30, 2020, when the virus was detected in a Chinese national who traveled from Wuhan, China and Hong Kong. The second case was confirmed on February 2, the patient being the first death outside mainland China was also Chinese. Three days later, on February 5, another Chinese national was confirmed to be the third case in the Philippines. After a month, on March 5, the Department of Health (DOH) announced that the first Filipino in the Philippines confirmed to be infected with COVID-19 who is also the fourth case while the fifth case is the first case of local transmission since the infected person did not travel outside the Philippines. The sixth case that was confirmed on March 7 is the wife of the fifth case. In the following days, the number of cases steadily increased.

== Lockdowns ==
Implementation of community quarantine in Luzon from March 17 to June 15.

=== Initial lockdowns ===
On March 8, 2020, President Rodrigo Duterte signed Proclamation 922 placing the entire Philippines under state of public health emergency because of the COVID-19 threat that is looming in the nation. On the next day, March 9, Congressman Joey Salceda of the 2nd district of the province of Albay recommended a lockdown of the entire National Capital Region (NCR) for a period of seven days, in response to the COVID-19 threat. Some of Salceda's proposals for implementing the lockdown include banning mass transportation and stopping the operation of the Philippine expressway network that ply to and from the region, and canceling of classes and work. At first, President Rodrigo Duterte turned down the idea because it would "hamper the flow of basic commodities," although, Health Secretary Francisco Duque III, opined that the lockdown may put into effect in some areas where there are reported community-based transmissions, but not the whole NCR.

On March 12, President Duterte announced the "community quarantine" of Metro Manila that would start at 12 midnight on March 15 up to April 14 that covers 16 cities and one municipality. Traveling through land, domestic air, and domestic sea from Metro Manila was suspended but with exceptions. For international travel, restrictions are imposed on those who came from countries with localized COVID-19 transmissions, except for citizens of the Philippines (including their foreign spouse and children) or holders of permanent resident visas and diplomat visas. Mass transportation vehicles are allowed to operate provided that persons riding these vehicles comply with the social distancing guidelines. Curfew has also put into place by the local government units (LGUs) of Metro Manila.

=== Expansion to Luzon ===
During the second day of the implementation of the Metro Manila community quarantine, on March 16, President Duterte declared a Luzon-wide "enhanced community quarantine" (ECQ) that aimed to further combat the effect of the continuing and increasing spread of COVID-19. It took effect on March 17 and was supposedly scheduled to end on April 12. This quarantine also included the Mimaropa region (Occidental and Oriental Mindoro, Marinduque, Romblon and Palawan) despite it being outside the Luzon island. The Luzon ECQ is described under a March 16 memorandum from Executive Secretary Salvador Medialdea by the order of the President as compliance to Proclamation No. 929 (state of calamity of the whole Philippines due to COVID-19), Proclamation No. 922 (public health emergency) and Republic Act No. 11332 (reporting of communicable diseases law).

=== Extensions ===
==== April 30, 2020 ====
On March 30, DOH Secretary Duque said that lifting the ECQ is "too early to assess," citing the Wuhan lockdown was still in effect even if the new COVID-19 daily reported cases are single-digit only. On the next day, March 31, the Spokesperson of the IATF-EID and Cabinet Secretary Karlo Nograles revealed that the DOH will be the forefront on the technical working group who will set parameters that President Duterte will utilize for making the decision regarding the lifting, extension or expansion of the Luzon ECQ. He further added that science will decide on the matter.

The IATF-EID met on April 3 and came up with factors in determining the total or partial lifting, or possible extension or expansion of the Luzon ECQ. The factors include social, economic, security, COVID-19 epidemiological curve trends, and health care system capacity. National Task Force (NTF) COVID-19 chief implementer Secretary Carlito Galvez Jr. said that the President is set to decide on the matter between April 12 and 14. On a televised broadcast on April 6, Duterte said that he is considering to lengthen the Luzon ECQ up to the end of April 2020. On April 7, Cabinet Secretary Nograles said that Duterte accepted the recommendation of the IATF-EID to extend the Luzon ECQ to April 30. He further said that the "extension of the ECQ shall be without prejudice to the discretion of the President to relax the implementation of the ECQ in some local jurisdictions, or the granting of exemptions in favor of certain sectors, as public health considerations and food security may warrant." He also said that there is no need to expand the ECQ to the Visayas and Mindanao.

==== May 15, 2020 ====
According to the April 20 statement of the newly installed Presidential spokesperson Harry Roque, the President is 50/50 on deciding the lifting of the ECQ that is expiring on April 30. Duterte was set to decide on the fate of the Luzon ECQ on April 23 but Roque later said that Duterte will make a public address about the Luzon ECQ on April 24. He previously met with health policy experts to help him decide on the matter. According to Senator Bong Go, who was also present during the meeting, said that a modified quarantine is likely to be implemented after April 30. On the other hand, the WHO recommended on April 22 a gradual lifting of the lockdowns. The organization earlier advised the Philippine authorities to contemplate on the "epidemiological situation" with regards to the lifting of the Luzon lockdown.

In his address to the public on April 24, Duterte declared that the ECQ is prolonged up to May 15, 2020, only for Metro Manila, Calabarzon, Central Luzon (except Aurora), and other areas in Luzon that are deemed high-risk to critical-risk for COVID-19. These high-risk areas include Benguet, Pangasinan, Albay and Catanduanes. On the other hand, beginning May 1, low-risk to moderate-risk areas will be placed under general community quarantine, where implementation is less strict than the ECQ.

==== May 31, 2020 ====
The mayors of Metro Manila proposed three options the IATF-EID may take on May 15: extend the ECQ until May 30, downgrade the quarantine measures to GCQ, or allow the localities of Metro Manila to be placed under a modified GCQ where mayors could place certain barangays under lockdown as necessary. On May 12, Duterte declared that only Metro Manila and Laguna in Luzon, (and Cebu City in the Visayas) would be under modified ECQ or MECQ from May 16 to 31 because these places are determined as high-risk for COVID-19 while areas that are moderate risk would be under GCQ.

It was originally announced by the government that low-risk areas would neither be under ECQ nor GCQ but they made the statement in error and made it clear that low-risk areas would be under modified GCQ. Those regions in Luzon that would be under GCQ include Cagayan Valley, Central Luzon, Calabarzon except Laguna and Cordillera Administrative Region. On the other hand, Luzon regions under modified GCQ would be Ilocos Region, Bicol Region and Mimaropa. On May 15, the IATF-EID made a resolution declaring additional places under MECQ from May 16 to 31 and those places are Bataan, Bulacan, Nueva Ecija, Pampanga including Angeles City and Zambales.

=== Post-ECQ and reimpositions ===
On June 1, 2020, Metro Manila exited MECQ and transitioned to GCQ as previously announced by President Duterte on May 28, 2020. Other areas in Luzon, namely, Cagayan Valley, Central Luzon, Calabarzon, Albay, and Pangasinan were also placed under GCQ on June 1, while the rest of the country were placed under modified GCQ or MGCQ.

==== August 4–18, 2020 ====
On August 2, the IATF-EID went on a meeting to discuss the petition of medical front liners to reimpose an ECQ in Metro Manila. The meeting later made a decision to revert Metro Manila, Bulacan, Cavite, Laguna, and Rizal back to MECQ again from August 4 until August 18.

==== January 25 – February 15, 2021 ====
On January 22, Kalinga Governor Ferdinand Tubban and Tabuk Mayor Darwin Estrañero requested for the re-imposition of the ECQ status in Tabuk. The MECQ was also imposed in the municipalities of Rizal, Lubuagan, Tanudan and Balbalan. Two more municipalities were placed in GCQ status, while only Pinukpuk remained in MGCQ status. However, Pinukpuk was also included in areas under GCQ as the status was reimposed for the entire Cordillera Administrative Region on January 29. This is due to a rapid increase in infected persons in the province, with the DOH citing Tabuk and the four towns as "critical areas" for virus spread.

On February 6, regional IATF-EID chairperson Araceli San Jose approved the extension of the ECQ in Tabuk until February 15. Additionally, Tinglayan and Pinukpuk, which were previously under GCQ, intensified lockdown status to MECQ. Tanudan and Lubuagan remained under modified ECQ. Rizal and Balbalan were relaxed to GCQ with the rest of the region.

==== March 29 - September 15, 2021 ====
On March 29, the IATF-EID reimposed the ECQ in the Greater Manila Area due to a surge in COVID-19 cases in the area. It was originally set to expire on April 4, however, on April 3, it was extended for another week. On April 11, Presidential Spokesperson Harry Roque announced that the quarantine measure in the area would be downgraded to MECQ for the remainder of the month of April; it was later extended up to May 14. On May 13, Roque announced that the quarantine measure in the Greater Manila Area, Abra, Quirino and Santiago was downgraded to GCQ from May 15 to 31.

For the period between June 1 to 15, MECQ is raised in the provinces of Apayao, Cagayan and Ifugao, and in the cities of Santiago and Puerto Princesa. The province of Benguet with the exception of Baguio was also under MECQ.

On July 30, the government ordered to place Metro Manila under general community quarantine (GCQ) with heightened and additional restrictions from July 30 until August 5 followed by the enhanced community quarantine (ECQ) from August 6 to 20 due to rising cases of SARS-CoV-2 Delta variant which was first detected in India.

On August 5, President Rodrigo Duterte approved the recommendation of the IATF to place some provinces under ECQ and MECQ. Laguna was placed under ECQ from August 6 to 15. Lucena and the provinces of Cavite and Rizal were placed under modified enhanced community quarantine (MECQ). Batangas and Quezon, on the other hand, will be under general community quarantine (GCQ) with heightened restrictions from August 6 to 15.

On August 7, President Duterte approved the IATF's recommendation to place Bataan under ECQ from August 8 to 22 due to the growth of virus infections.

On August 13, the MECQ in some areas was extended until August 31. Laguna was shifted to MECQ from August 16 to 31. The province then joined the rest of Calabarzon provinces and the city of Lucena in adopting the new Alert Level system by October 20, effectively lifting the MECQ status in the region.

On October 14, Batanes extended its MECQ status until October 31. Other provinces under MECQ until October 31 were Apayao, Bataan, Bulacan, and Kalinga. Naga City was also placed under MECQ.

On October 29, Mountain Province and Catanduanes are placed under MECQ. Bataan and Bulacan joined the rest of Central Luzon in adopting the Alert Level System on November 1, effectively lifting the MECQ status in the region. All the other provinces in Luzon that are yet to adopt the Alert Level System were placed under GCQ and MGCQ.

=== Specific local government units lockdowns in Luzon ===
Aside from the Luzon-wide enhance community quarantine which restricts the movement of people to and from the island group, several LGUs in Luzon has imposed their own lockdown measures. Although, the LGUs are bound to comply with the national government rules on the implementation of their own lockdowns as per the directive by the President on March 16. With the passing of the Bayanihan to Heal as One Act on March 25, LGUs are legally compelled to abide with the guidelines set by the national government for the ECQ but still practicing autonomy for matters not defined by the national government or operating under the parameters that have been set.

Here are some of the lockdowns imposed by several LGUs in Luzon:

- On March 18, Albay Governor Francis Bichara placed the province under lockdown, ordering the temporarily closure of the province's borders. Bichara stated that only delivery vehicles of essential goods may be permitted entry and exit of the province, subject to inspection and sanitation procedures. He also stated that the measure may shorten the period of the Luzon-wide "enhanced" community quarantine for the province by 15 days, if successful.

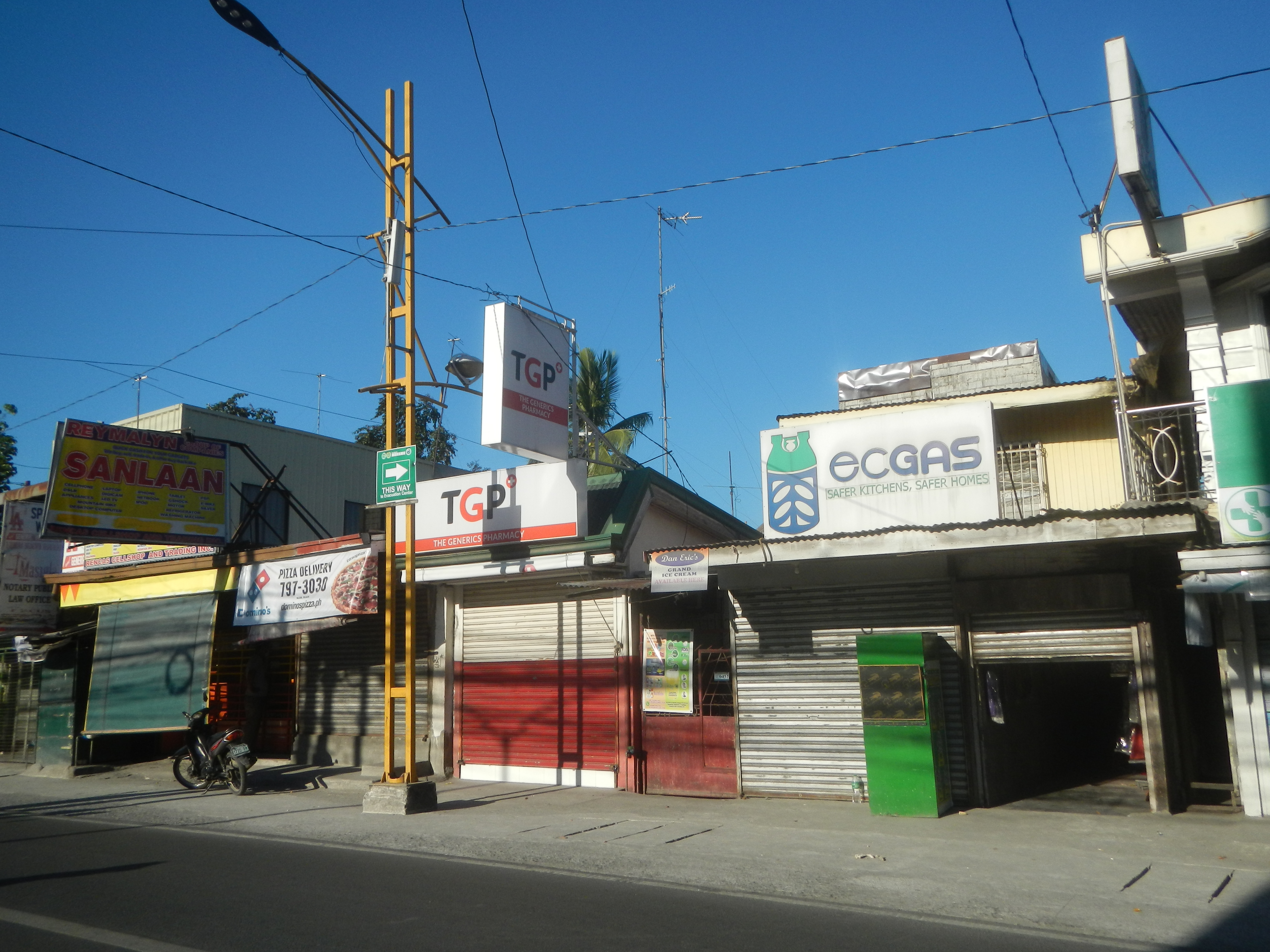
Shuttered establishments in Baliuag, Bulacan on March 20, 2020

- On March 19, the provincial government of Bulacan carried out the enhanced community quarantine measures, effectively placing the entire province under a lockdown. Classes were suspended; public transportation systems were put on hold, with the movement of the populace limited to the accessibility of essential needs including basic goods and healthcare services; vital establishments were allowed to remain open, and a curfew from 8:00 in the evening to 5:00 in the morning was set up. Barangays in several municipalities (such as Bocaue) had issued passes that permit only one member of a family to leave their house for acquiring basic provisions.
- On March 23, Pangasinan Governor Amado Espino III placed the province under an "extreme enhanced community quarantine" after health officials confirmed four cases of the virus in the province. Under the said measure, Espino stated that residents and visitors are prohibited from entering and exiting provincial borders. In addition, authorities in Malasiqui placed the municipality under a separate "extreme enhanced community quarantine" as two of the four confirmed cases were residents of the municipality.
- On March 26, Tarlac Governor Susan Yap announced that the province would be placed under lockdown starting March 29, after it confirmed its first two cases of COVID-19.
- On March 28, Laguna Governor Ramil Hernandez placed the province under a "total lockdown" following its rise in COVID-19 cases to more than 20. Hernandez said the "total lockdown" restricts the movement of people to only front line staff, private firm employees involved in basic services, and only one person per household to purchase essential supplies. That same day, Bacacay Mayor Armando Romano ordered a 24-hour lockdown on the municipality after a resident tested positive.
- With the rising number of COVID-19 cases in the province of Rizal, acting Governor of Rizal Reynaldo San Juan implemented a total lockdown of the Rizal province on April 6 blocking entry and exit of its borders.
- Sampaloc, Manila was placed under "hard lockdown" from April 23, 8:00 pm to April 25, 8:00 pm by the order of Mayor Isko Moreno amidst the additional 99 COVID-19 cases of the district. Moreno also previously ordered the total shutdown of Barangay 20 due to a gathering of an estimated 100 people for a boxing match along a street, which is a violation of ECQ guidelines.

=== Elsewhere in the Philippines ===
With the issuance of Proclamation No. 922 declaring the entire Philippines under state of public health emergency, all LGUs in the Philippines, including the other two island groups in the Philippines, namely the Visayas and Mindanao, must undertake measures to cut the COVID-19 threat. According to the IATF-EID, LGUs in the Visayas and Mindanao have the freedom on the implementation of community quarantines or lockdowns in their jurisdiction but using the guidelines by the IATF-EID. The Department of Interior and Local Government (DILG) also said that the LGUs in the Visayas and Mindanao have the flexibility in evaluating their lockdown with the help of the DOH.

Here are the several community quarantines outside Luzon:

- Misamis Oriental Governor Yevgeny Emano ordered on March 24 a general community quarantine on the province until April 14, banning the entry of visitors and implementing a province-wide curfew from 8:00 p.m. to 5:00 a.m. the following day.
- Cebu Governor Gwen Garcia issued Executive Order No. 5-N on March 25 declaring the entire province of Cebu under enhanced community quarantine to permit strict guideline in fighting the COVID-19 threat.
- The implementation of an enhanced community quarantine in the Davao Region was announced on April 2, 2020. The quarantine began at 9:00 pm of April 4 and has no scheduled end date. As of April 2, there were already at least 61 confirmed cases in the region, 49 of which were recorded in Davao City.

== Rules and guidelines ==
=== During ECQ of the entire Luzon from March 17 to April 30, 2020 ===
==== Restrictions on the people's movement ====
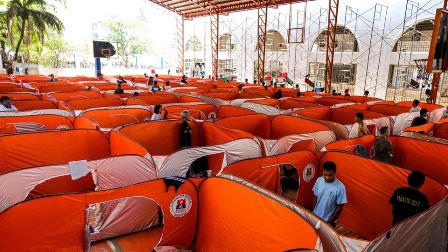
Modular tents set up in Manila as temporary shelter for the homeless.

Under the Luzon ECQ setup, mass gatherings are completely prohibited and all means of public transport is no longer allowed limiting the movement of people. All schools in all levels are temporarily prohibited to conduct classes and activities until April 14. Remote work was permitted by government workers of the executive branch except for the skeletal workforce consisting of uniformed personnel (Philippine National Police, Armed Forces of the Philippines, and Philippine Coast Guard), those providing services in the frontline of health and emergency, and border control. For the private sector, companies are also advised to implement remote work policies.

The populace's movement is restricted to their homes and they can only go outside to just buy basic needs such as food, medicines and other things needed for sustenance. Only a single person per household can go outside to buy basic necessities. In particular, the City of Manila, Bacoor, and other places issued quarantine passes to persons who were designated by their household would go out their homes to buy needed goods. The ECQ also directs stricter social distancing protocols where people going to public places must observe one meter distance apart from each other.

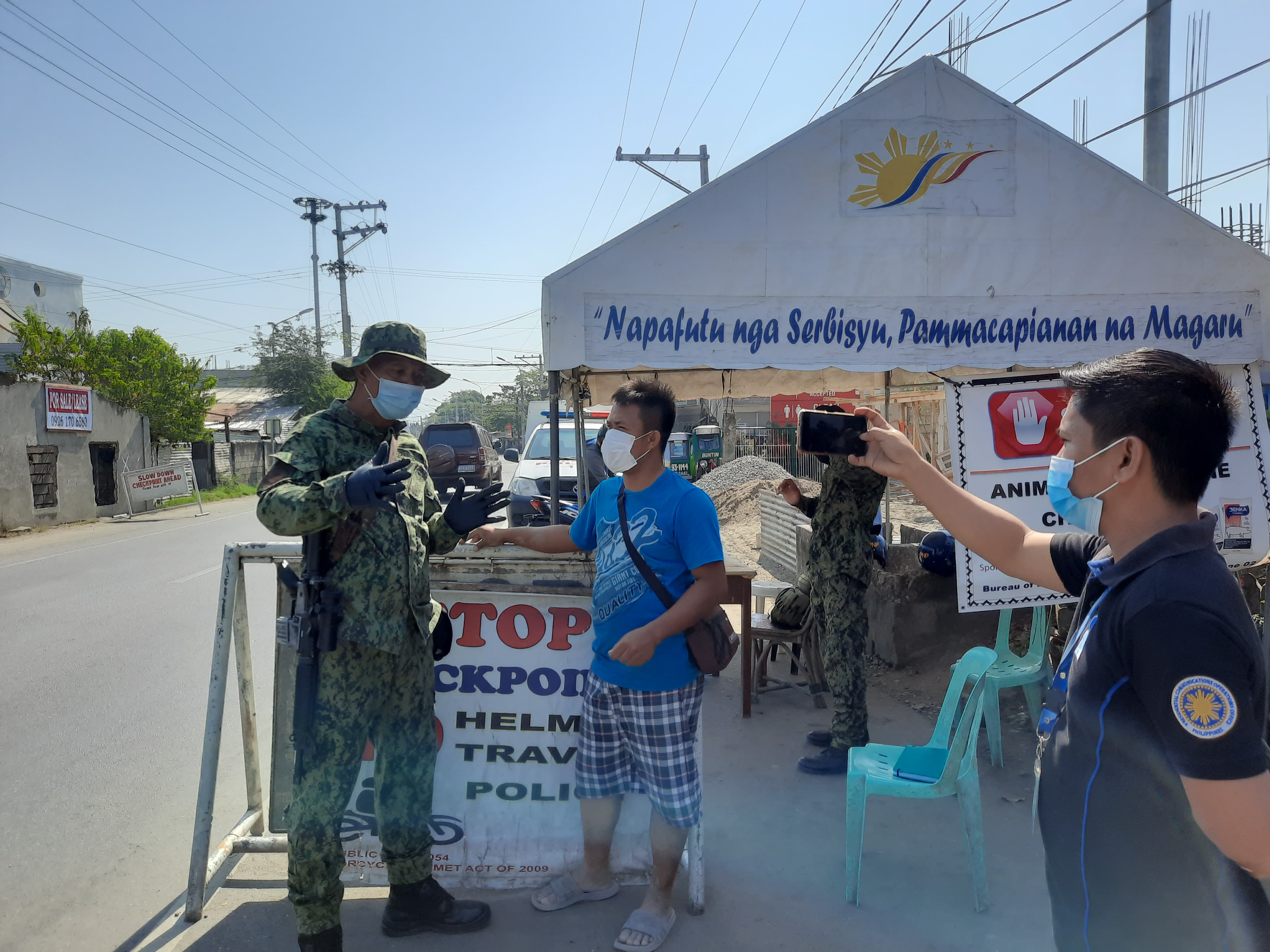
Checkpoint in Tuguegarao.

==== Allowed and disallowed establishments ====
Non-essential businesses are not permitted to open and they will be forcibly closed if they do. In contrast, businesses who provide food and medicine are allowed to operate. In addition, gasoline stations and funeral services can continue their operations. Furthermore, financial institutions such as bank and money transfer services and utility providers are also not barred to open. Capital markets such as the Bangko Sentral ng Pilipinas, the Securities and Exchange Commission, and the Philippine Stock Exchange, were permitted to open beginning March 18 only, provided that skeletal workforce are set up. Those industries who act as Business Process Outsourcing or call centers as well as export-oriented industries are also allowed to continue with their operations as long as they observe social distancing protocols, temporary shelter for their employees by March 18, and keep up with a skeletal workforce. Hotels and other businesses that provide accommodation are not operational and they are only allowed to lodge foreign guests who have bookings or guests who have long-term leases as of March 17.

==== Travel restrictions ====
Traveling through air, sea and land is restricted only to diplomats, uniformed workers (especially those who travel with medical supplies, specimens from the laboratory in relation to COVID-19), and those who do humanitarian work. People who were going outside the Philippines through Luzon were only limited to Overseas Filipino Workers and foreigners; and they must be escorted by only one person.

On the other hand, only Filipino citizens and diplomats with visas issued by the government of the Philippines were the ones who have permission to enter the Philippines through international airports in Luzon provided that they undergo quarantine procedures. International travelers in transit were also allowed to enter but subject to quarantine procedures too. Foreigners who wish to come to the Philippines can go through Cebu but they must go undergo quarantine procedures. However, this was changed when Department of Foreign Affairs (DFA) Secretary Teodoro Locsin Jr. announced on March 19 the suspension of visas and visa-free privileges of foreigners. Although, DFA clarified on March 20 that there are exceptions. Foreigners who are in the Philippines already or whose visas issued by other government agencies can stay until they depart from the Philippines. In addition, visas are still valid for foreigners who have Filipino spouses or foreigners who have Filipino parents.

Cargo forwarders, farmers, and other food producers are not covered by the travel prohibition but they must go through quarantine checkpoints. Those who are guarding or securing an establishment are only permitted to work and travel within the area of their responsibility. Media practitioners with their vehicles are allowed to go to the quarantine area as long as they get a media pass from the Presidential Communications Operations Office.

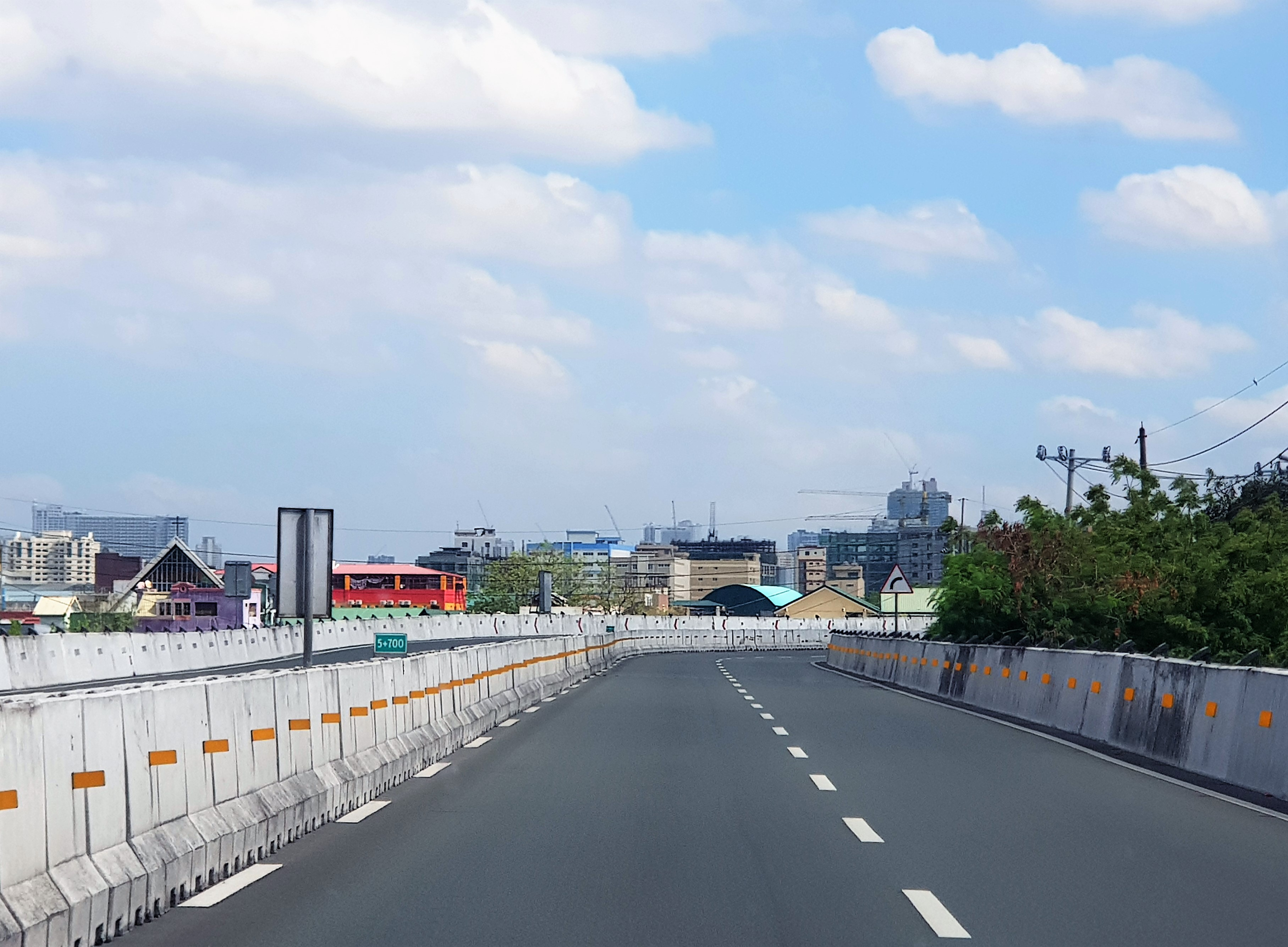
Ninoy Aquino Expressway (NAIAX) almost empty due to the restrictions imposed by the government during Enhanced Community Quarantine.

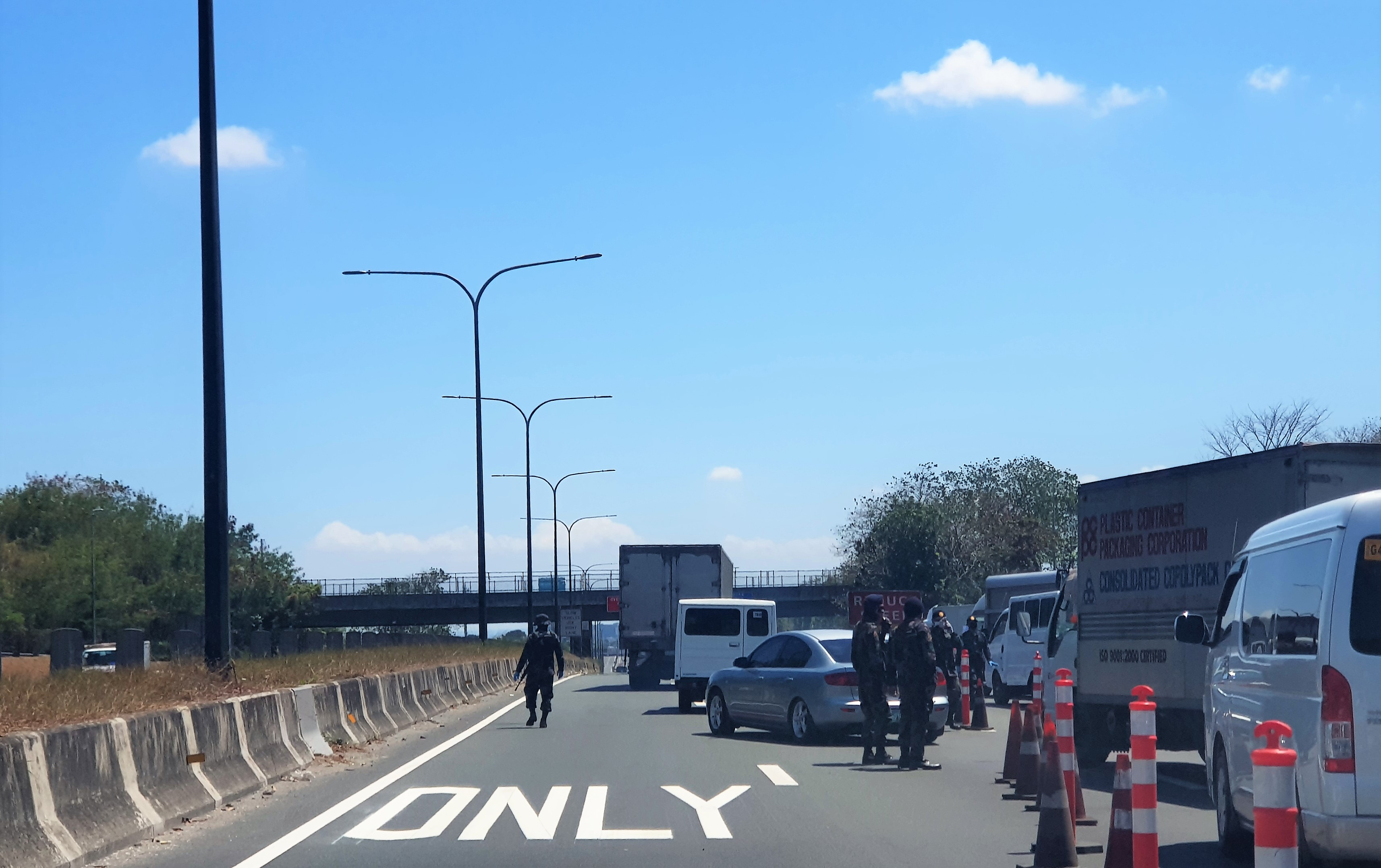
Philippine Army manning checkpoints going outside Metro Manila during the Enhanced Community Quarantine in SLEX Southbound

=== During ECQ of certain areas in Luzon from May 1 to 15, 2020 ===
From May 1 to 15, the ECQ in Luzon became limited only to Metro Manila, Central Luzon, Calabarzon (except Aurora province) and other areas deemed as high-risk for COVID-19. It followed the usual ECQ rules as stated in Executive Order 112 by President Duterte. The rest of Luzon was proclaimed to be under "general community quarantine" or GCQ where implementation of the quarantine is less strict.

Under GCQ, low-risk industries can let their employees work in phases as well as priority and vital projects in construction may continue with the guidance of the Department of Public Works and Highways. The populace can go outside their houses only to buy basic necessities as LGUs enforce night curfew to persons who are not workers. In addition, Mall stores or shopping centers under GCQ areas that are categorized as "non-leisure" can open to a limited degree and operation of public transportation are allow but with less volume. Universities and colleges in areas under GCQ can end the academic year and provide credentials to students. Similarly, airports and seaports can also operate to make the delivery of goods open.

=== During MECQ of certain areas in Luzon from May 16 to 31, 2020 ===
From May 16 to 31, only a limited number of places in Luzon (Metro Manila, Laguna, Bataan, Bulacan, Nueva Ecija, Pampanga including Angeles and Zambales) are under modified ECQ or MECQ, which is a stage where ECQ areas are being transitioned to GCQ. More businesses that can operate under the MECQ are determined by the IATF-EID while government employees, accredited diplomatic missions and international organizations work in a skeletal workforce. Hotels and similar institutions are not allowed to open except those who are exempted by the IATF-EID guidelines.

In general, unauthorized public gathering were still not permitted under MECQ but up to five people can gather for religious purposes. People can go outside to exercise but with safety measures still in place like social distancing and wearing of face masks. However, there are still certain people who are not allowed to go outside their homes such as those with health risks and pregnant women. Schools under MECQ are still nonoperational and public transport are still banned except for tricycles.

== Implementation ==
=== Management ===
The IATF-EID for the Management of Emerging Infectious Diseases that was created through Executive Order No. 168 in 2014 convened in January 2020 to address the growing viral outbreak in Wuhan, China. They made a resolution to manage the spreading of the new virus, which was known at the time as 2019 novel coronavirus (2019-nCoV) and eventually renamed to severe acute respiratory syndrome coronavirus 2 (SARS-CoV-2), the virus that causes COVID-19. On March 9, 2020, President Duterte called the IATF-EID amidst the rising cases of COVID-19 in the Philippines.

Executive Secretary Medialdea issued a memorandum on March 16 regarding the implementation of the enhanced community quarantine of the entire Luzon addressing the heads of government agencies, offices and similar institutions as well as state universities and colleges and LGUs. On the following day, the IATF-EID approved and adopted operational guidelines for the Luzon ECQ. On March 18, Medialdea issued another memorandum about additional guidelines for the Luzon ECQ affirming the rules set by the IATF.

On March 25, the IATF-EID revealed a National Action Plan (NAP) to slow down the spreading of COVID-19. The NAP was created to effectively and efficiently implement and decentralize the system of managing the COVID-19 situation. In addition, the IATF-EID created the COVID-19 National Task Force headed by Department of National Defense Secretary Delfin Lorenzana, which handles the operational command. At the same time, the IATF-EID became the "policy-making body of operations" while the National Incident Command administers the daily concerns and operations.

=== Mobilization ===
On the first day of the implementation of the enhanced community quarantine or ECQ, President Duterte declared the entire Philippines under a state of calamity for a period of six months "unless earlier lifted or extended as circumstances may warrant," in order for the LGUs to act swiftly on emergency circumstances through getting funds fast. In addition, the President called all agencies that enforce the law, with the help of the Armed Forces of the Philippines, "to undertake all necessary measures to ensure peace and order in affected areas, as may be necessary." He also ordered the freezing of price of basic goods, emergency medicines and medical supplies through a memorandum. Agencies of the national government and the LGUs are responsible for making sure that prices are controlled.

Also on the first day of the ECQ, the DOH launched hotlines for COVID-19 emergencies. The hotlines (02-894-COVID or 02-894-26843 and 1555) were made possible through the DOH's partnership with the DILG's National Emergency Hotline and the Philippine Long Distance Telephone (PLDT) as well as Smart Communications, PLDT's mobile subsidiary. The numbers are available 24/7 throughout the Philippines.

=== Suspensions and extensions of deadlines ===
On March 18, 2020, the second day of the ECQ, Senate President Vicente Sotto III spoke to Department of Transportation (DOTr) Secretary Arthur Tugade and proposed the extension of the renewal of expiring licenses of drivers and franchises of public transport due to the inconveniences brought about the implementation of the ECQ. Tugade responded positively and directed the Land Transportation Office (LTO) and the Land Transportation Franchising and Regulatory Board (LTFRB) to extend the deadline up to the end of April 2020. The Bureau of Internal Revenue also lengthen the deadline for filing income tax returns (ITR) from the original April 15 date to May 15. Nevertheless, the agency appealed to the public to file their ITR on the original April 15 date if they are already prepared, "in order to help the Duterte administration raise enough funds" for battling the economic impact of COVID-19. BIR is expecting a shortfall of about Php 145 billion tax collections because of the new deadline.

On March 20, the fourth day of the ECQ, the DOTr announced that they will disallow the entry of foreigners to the Philippines in compliance with the order by the DFA to suspend visa issuance and visa-free privileges starting midnight of March 22. Exceptions to this rule include "foreign spouses and children (provided that the foreign spouse and children are traveling with the Filipino national), foreign government and international organization officials accredited to the Philippines." The Bureau of Immigration followed suit and applied the restrictions set by the DFA.

=== Granting of special powers to the President ===
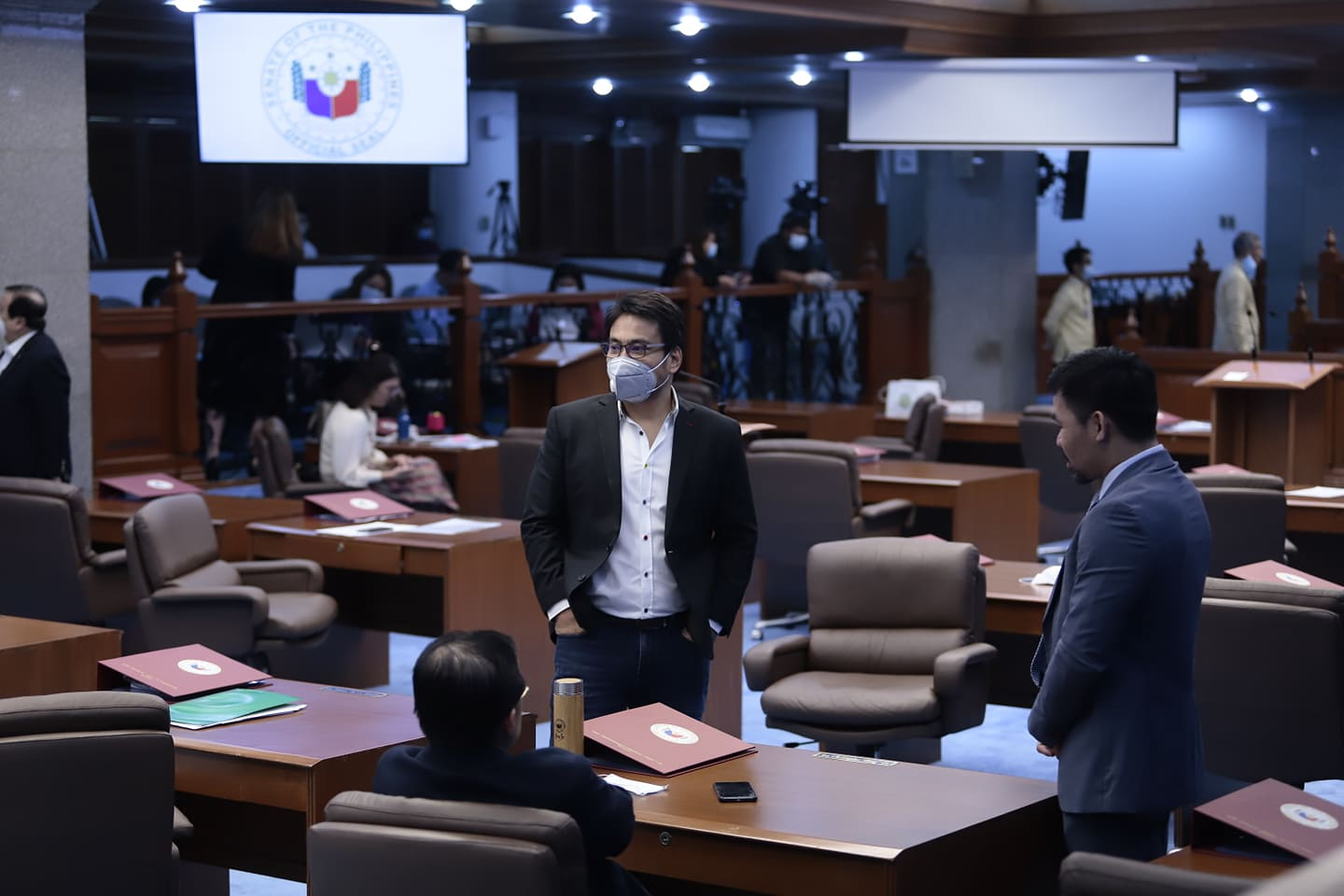
Senators during a special session to tackle the passage of the Bayanihan to Heal as One Act, March 23, 2020

President Duterte issued Proclamation No. 933 on March 21, calling the Philippine Congress to convene a special session to make a law that will authorize the President to execute necessary powers for handling the COVID-19 national emergency. The House of the Representatives convened on March 23 and approved House Bill No. 6616, also known as the "We Heal as One Act of 2020," which took them fourteen hours to pass it. The Philippine Senate passed Senate Bill 1418, a counterpart measure also known as "Bayanihan to Heal as One Act." President Duterte signed the combined bills on March 24, putting it into law as Republic Act 11469, having the same short name as the Senate bill. The law, which follows World Health Organization (WHO) guidelines in combating the spread of COVID-19 throughout the country, gives the President thirty special powers that will last for three months unless modified by Congress.

In relation to the community quarantine, Republic Act 11469 grants the President to "immediately mobilize assistance in the provision of basic necessities to families and individuals affected by the community quarantine, especially indigents and their families." Low-income families of about 18 million affected by the implementation of the Luzon ECQ and other areas affected the COVID-19 are set to receive Php 5,000 to Php 8,000 subsidy a month for two months.

In section 4 (aa) of the act, the President also has the power to direct banks and other similar institutions to provide a 30-day grace period on loans and credit card payments that falls within the ECQ period "without incurring interests, penalties, fees or other charges." Residential areas as well as commercial businesses under the micro, small and medium enterprises category also gets a 30-day grace period on rental payments falling under the ECQ period without also incurring any other penalties or charges. Furthermore, under section 4 (h) of the law, the President is authorized to run the operations of private hospitals and medical facilities to allow health workers in there and to make it as quarantine centers and quarantine areas among others. As Congress gave these powers to the President, the act also states that the President "shall submit a weekly report to Congress of all acts performed pursuant to this act during the immediately preceding week."

== Impact and reactions ==
=== Economic ===
==== General reactions ====
Congressman Joey Salceda who is an economist and the House of the Representatives Committee chairman on Ways and Means said that the Philippines could go into recession if there is no implementation of a community quarantine, although, he admitted that the COVID-19 pandemic will affect the economy of the Philippines in a negative way. According to Bangko Sentral ng Pilipinas (BSP) Governor Benjamin Diokno on March 18, 2020, the economic impact is still not known but "it will definitely have an impact." Two days later, on March 20, 2020, the BSP said that the shutdown of Luzon will slow down the economy of the Philippines with a disruptive impact. BSP further said the economic impact would last until the second half of 2020 but it is expected to rebound in 2021.

==== GDP, basic goods and economic growth ====
In other forecast, the domestic output estimates by economic managers for the year 2020 are from 0.3 to 1.0 percentage point. The National Economic and Development Authority revised its 2020 economic growth forecast to 5.5 to 6.5 percent against the targeted 6.5 to 7.5 percent growth, assuming that the COVID-19 problem lasts until June 2020. It is expected that the prices of basic goods will go up to 2.2 percent only compared to 2.5 percent average in 2019. Nomura, a Japanese financial holding company, lowered its gross domestic product (GDP) estimates to the Philippines from 5.6% to 1.6%. The analysts from the holding company further said that the estimates assume a scenario where the Luzon lockdown ends on the middle of April as scheduled.

When Congressman Salceda was interviewed by online stockbroker COL Financial, he said that in an optimistic scenario when the lockdown is very effective, flattens the curve, and provides a good stimulus, the GDP would rise to 3.3% in 2020 and 5.1% in 2021. In a mediocre or reasonable case where the lockdown is a little successful, the GDP would increase to 2.9% in 2020 and 4.0% in 2021. Lastly, in a pessimistic case where the economy is basically in recession, health emergency persists, and the lockdown is lengthen, there would be a −0.3% GDP in 2020 and 2.9% GDP in 2021.

On March 6, 2020, the Asian Development Bank (ADB) issued a publication summarizing the economic effects of the COVID-19 outbreak as a whole on the developing countries in Asia, including the Philippines. According to graphical representation presented by ADB in the publication, the GDP impact of the outbreak in the Philippines would be about between 0.0 and -0.5 percentage of the GDP in a best-case scenario while in a worst-case scenario, it would be around slightly near −0.5 percentage of the GDP with a hypothetical worst-case impact of about near −1.5 percentage of the GDP. The publication also indicated that tourism and business travel are the important channels through which economies will be affected in developing countries of Asia as well as supply-side disruptions and economic effects in other important channels through health and health care.

==== Stock market and banks ====
After the two-day closure of the Philippine Stock Exchange (PSE) due to the Luzon lockdown, the market crashed to about 24 percent reaching the 4,000 level, which is an eight-year low. The PSE reopened after submitting a position paper to the IATF-EID, requesting to be exempted from the lockdown. On April 1, about two weeks after the implementation of the lockdown, the PSE regained after the stock market made an upswing for two consecutive days due to the possibility of a more eased lockdown guidelines.

Banks remained open during ECQ providing their services through limited branches, skeletal workforce and shortened banking hours. A number of banks lengthen and modified deadlines on payment dues to help those people who are affected by the coronavirus pandemic.

==== Workforce ====
ADB predicted that due to prolonged COVID-19 woes, there are at least 87,000 jobless Filipinos in a best-case scenario, while in a worst-case scenario, 252,000 Filipinos would lose their jobs. Based on the data from the Department of Labor and Employment (DOLE) on March 23, 2020, there are 108,620 workers affected in the middle of the ECQ in Luzon, covering 2,317 establishments. Only 889 companies implemented flexible work that affected 41,331 workers. On the other hand, 600 companies closed down their business affecting 30,796 workers. According to DOLE's report, the affected industries are tourism-related, restaurants, manufacturing and hotel.

On March 31, DOLE Secretary Silvestre Bello III said that the affected workers increased to more than 630,000, covering 15,213 establishments. He added that 169,232 of those workers belong to the informal sector. He pleaded the employers to register to the COVID-19 Adjustment Measures Program (CAMP), the financial assistance program of the government that will benefit their affected workers. The said financial assistance is separate from the Department of Social Welfare and Development (DSWD) and other agencies, which give cash aid to affected people under the Bayanihan to Heal As One act.

=== Entertainment and broadcast media ===
==== ABS-CBN ====
In a statement on March 13, 2020, ABS-CBN announced that the television network is halting the production of television series and the presentation of its live shows. Reruns of previously aired teleseryes or Philippine television dramas (such as 100 Days to Heaven, May Bukas Pa and On the Wings of Love) replaced then-ongoing series (Ang Probinsyano) and were aired until the shutdown of the network on May 5, 2020. Prior to the imposition of the community quarantine, ABS-CBN initially suspended the admission of studio audience for its live TV programs.

ABS-CBN News and Current Affairs programs continued to deliver live news on their television and radio stations. On April 1, 2020, DZMM and DZMM TeleRadyo aired on ANC and suspended regular programming on DZMM due to the exposure of their workers to persons under investigation for COVID-19.

During the reimposition of the ECQ in the Greater Manila Area, studio programs such as It's Showtime and Magandang Buhay suspended their live broadcast.

==== GMA Network ====
GMA Network also temporarily suspended its own television production due to the lockdown that affected their entertainment programming while blocktimers and co-producers adhered to community quarantine guidelines. Reruns of concluded drama series (such as Ika-6 na Utos and the 2016 remake of Encantadia) replaced ongoing series (such as Prima Donnas and the Philippine adaptation of the 2016 Korean drama series Descendants of the Sun) that temporarily halted its production. Some GMA shows (such as Magpakailanman and Sarap, 'Di Ba?) were able to broadcast their pre-taped episodes during the first week of the ECQ.

Upon the declaration of the public health emergency, GMA banned live audiences on their variety shows (such as All-Out Sundays) and later aired reruns during the ECQ period. Eat Bulaga!, a GMA blocktimer that airs live in APT Studios, was the first variety show that disallowed live audience. With regards to its news and public affairs television programming, GMA Network's news organization arm, GMA News and Public Affairs, continued to air live news. Its sister station, GMA News TV (now GTV as of February 22, 2021), went off air for a day at one point during the Luzon ECQ. Their sister radio stations, Barangay LS 97.1 and Super Radyo DZBB, also continued to broadcast.

==== Other networks and entertainment companies ====
TV5 has also reorganized their television programming because of the ECQ. On March 15, 2020, the Film Development Council of the Philippines ordered the stopping of the production of film, television and other audio-visual content during the community quarantine. CNN Philippines stopped its operations for a moment on March 18 after a positive COVID-19 patient entered the building premises where their office is located.

=== Environmental ===
Data that were released on March 25, 2020, by the Department of Environment and Natural Resources (DENR), the Institute of Environmental Science and Meteorology (IESM) at the University of the Philippines Diliman, and Airtoday.ph indicate a better air quality in Metro Manila since the implementation of the Luzon ECQ on March 16. PM2.5 (particulate matter 2.5 micrometers or less in diameter) was significantly decreased. At the same time, PM10 (particulate matter 10 micrometers or less in diameter) emissions were reduced significantly due to lessened utilization of machines that crush and grind as well as low dust exposure from roads.

Because of lowered air pollution during the Luzon lockdown, previously hazy skies can be seen clearly in Metro Manila. Some of the landscapes that are very visible in Metro Manila during the Luzon-wide lockdown include the Sierra Madre mountains, Mount Arayat, Mount Makiling and Mount Samat, which are rarely seen clearly due to smog.

=== Law and crime ===
==== Human rights violations ====
The Commission on Human Rights (CHR) stated that arrests due to disobeying the ECQ guidelines must be done in accordance with the law as the agency receives complaints regarding arrests. CHR spokesperson Jacqueline Ann de Guia noted that all arrests, including warrantless arrests, "must be strictly done within the legal standards inscribed in the law." She also added that the Luzon quarantine is not martial law, which President Duterte also stressed, but a safety measure. Department of Justice Secretary Menardo Guevarra earlier said that the arrests due to resisting and disobeying quarantine rules falls under Republic Act 11332 (law on reporting of communicable diseases) as well as the Revised Penal Code of the Philippines. Although, former Supreme Court spokesperson Ted Te opined that Republic Act 11332 is too broad to be a reason for the arrests.

There were reports of violations of human rights (including children's rights violations) as the government implements ECQ and human rights advocates had taken note of this. Presidential spokesperson Roque who is a human rights lawyer himself said that the Philippine government does not allow human rights violations as LGUs implement ECQ rules. He further made an assurance that the DILG "is committed to uphold human rights at all times and will not tolerate any violation during this period of ECQ." Meanwhile, the CHR already investigated these human rights violations incidents. Despite these human rights concerns, there are 86% of people surveyed by Gallup International, through its partner Philippine Survey and Research Center Inc., saying that they are willing to give up some of their human rights if those "sacrifices" would help stop the virus from spreading.

After more than a month of the implementation of the Luzon ECQ, on April 21, the Philippine National Police's (PNP) Chief Archie Gamboa said that they will right away perform arrests without warning to those who violate Luzon ECQ guidelines. This statement came amidst a reported 136,517 cases of quarantine violators after 35 days of the implementation of the Luzon ECQ. Human rights lawyers from the National Union of Peoples Lawyers (NUPL) reacted on Gamboa's statement; NUPL Secretary General Ephraim B. Cortez said that there is no particular law that makes someone a criminal for violating ECQ rules. Another group of lawyers from the Free Legal Assistance Group (FLAG) asked the PNP tor reconsider its position regarding arrests and FLAG also said that arresting without warning "would mean disregarding the carefully calibrated general rule and exceptions in Rule 113 (of the Rules of Criminal Procedures that provides a person in authority to inform a person being arrested) and creating a new rule of arrests, which is not allowed in the Constitution."

One fatal incident that happened during the implementation of ECQ rules was when a retired soldier named Winston Ragos was gunned down by a police officer in Quezon City on April 21 at a quarantine checkpoint for an ECQ violation. Police Master Sergeant Daniel Florendo was charged with homicide for shooting Ragos. The CHR earlier said that the agency is investigating the incident and reiterated that "strict measures, such as community lockdowns, were set during the COVID-19 pandemic to ultimately save lives. The agency was alarmed "when these measures trigger allegations of human rights violations and, worse, result in any loss of lives."

==== Crime rate ====
In Metro Manila, it was reported that crime rates went down by 65.4% during the first five days of the ECQ, from March 15 to 20, according to National Capital Region Police Office (NCRPO). The reason for the decrease was attributed to people staying at their homes as stated by NCRPO chief Police Major General Debold Sinas. After 24 days of the ECQ, the crime rate dropped to 62% in Luzon according to the PNP. Crimes in Luzon continued to decrease to 64.9% after 35 days of the ECQ, which is the biggest reduction recorded in Luzon.

=== Military diplomacy ===
One of the pronouncement made by President Duterte related to the Luzon-wide lockdown is implementing a ceasefire with the CPP-NPA (Communist Party of the Philippines-New People's Army) rebels. Presidential Spokesperson Panelo said that the ceasefire starts on March 19, 2020, and will end on April 15, 2020. This is done for the forces of the state to focus its resources to stop the spread of the COVID-19. He also urged the rebels to help the government on their efforts against the COVID-19 threat. Jose Maria Sison, CPP's founding chairman, initially said that the CPP and NDFP (National Democratic Front of the Philippines) will study the ceasefire offer. He later responded and said that the NDFP "is not assured and satisfied that the reciprocal unilateral ceasefires are based on national unity against COVID-19." On March 25, 2020, the CPP declared a ceasefire with government troops from March 26 to April 15, 2020, citing a call from United Nations Secretary General António Guterres for a global ceasefire between warring parties during the pandemic. The CPP later extended the ceasefire for a further 15 days on April 16.

=== Religious ===
In response to the prohibition of mass gatherings during the ECQ throughout Luzon, the Catholic Bishops' Conference of the Philippines (CBCP) through its President, Archbishop Romulo Valles, said that the celebration of the Eucharist, other liturgical services and spiritual activities from every diocese under their jurisdiction have to be broadcast live through the internet, television or radio. All activities for the Lenten season are also canceled. Earlier during the Metro Manila partial lockdown, the Archdiocese of Manila through its Apostolic Administrator, Bishop Broderick Pabillo, already canceled the celebration of the Holy Mass with congregation and dispensed the faithful from attending it.

As early as February, the Members Church of God International, supervised by Bro. Eli Soriano and Bro. Daniel Razon, have taken the necessary measures to see to it that the brethren in the congregation are prepared and properly oriented of the consequences that the pandemic will bring.

Other Christian churches such as a Baptist church in Quezon City also broadcast their religious service via live streaming amidst the COVID-19 threat. A spokesperson for Jehovah's Witnesses, Dean Jacek, said that they are doing virtual Christian meetings for their congregations. In different circumstances, the Iglesia ni Cristo announced the absence of worship services at their chapels. Instead, they advised their members to pray at home and they have given them lessons or guides that will be read by the head of the household. The Philippine Council of Evangelical Churches (PCEC), an organization composed of Evangelical and Protestant church member organizations, announced the suspension of regular Sunday worship services and other regular activities for a month and instead held its services via internet and social media.

After consulting with the Ulama and Imam Association of the Philippines, and the Imam Council of the Philippines, the National Commission on Muslim Filipinos stated that religious activities are suspended and encouraged Filipino Muslims to pray and stay at home. This is done to limit the result of the COVID-19's continuous spread, given that people had died in a Muslim prayer hall in San Juan, Metro Manila due to COVID-19.

== Effectiveness ==
=== Based on the number of cases and fatality rate ===
According to the study by the COVID-19 Pandemic Response Team of the University of the Philippines (UP) released on April 13, 2020, the implementation of the Luzon-wide ECQ has been effective to slowing down the spread of the coronavirus even if they predicted that there would be around 9,000 to 44,000 cases by the end of April 2020. Using time-series analysis, the UP response team was able to estimate those possible cases through trends that came from the DOH data they gathered. Greatly relying on the work being done on finding new cases is the key to evaluating the effectiveness of the ECQ. Although, they added that the next courses of actions will not be solely dependent on the number of cases. The effectiveness can also be determined by fatality rate, which is 5.38% and the reproduction number is 0.6398; with those figures as of April 10, the study declared that the ECQ has been effective.

Furthermore, the study provided a matrix for the LGUs that can be the basis of their decision on what quarantine methods they can use after the supposed end of the Luzon ECQ on April 30 for continued effectiveness. There are four proposed courses of action namely no quarantine, general community quarantine, enhanced community quarantine, and extreme enhanced community quarantine that would be dependent on the probability of outbreak and the ratio of confirmed cases to estimated outbreak threshold.

=== Based on the implementation of travel restrictions ===
The San Miguel Corporation, which is one of co-operators of the expressways in the Philippines, said on April 3 that during the first 14 days of the Luzon lockdown, the volume of vehicles dropped to 80% in the South Luzon Expressway (SLEx). However, on April 15, IATF spokesperson Nograles said that the number of private vehicles that ply over EDSA and other major thoroughfares got bigger after one month of the Luzon ECQ as the number of motorists defying the lockdown guidelines exceeded 108,000. Because of this, the PNP's Highway Patrol Group implemented a stricter imposition of quarantine rules on checkpoints along the SLEx, EDSA and other highways. Drivers of vehicles with non-essential business that are traveling on these roads were ticketed and their license confiscated.

=== Based on curfew, mass gatherings and social distancing rules ===
It was reported on April 2 that people violating curfew rules reached around 20,000 according to PNP. Duterte warned the public that there would be martial law-like lockdown if people continues to disobey ECQ rules, specifically social distancing and curfew. Some of those violations include crowded markets in Metro Manila and holding of cockfighting and boxing events. In other quarantine rules, the imposition of window hours risked violating the social distancing guidelines since more people would go to the markets at the same time; thus, the DILG directed LGUs to discontinue observing the window hours (where people go out only on specific few hours during the day).
