= Medical City =

Medical City may refer to:

- Medical City Dallas Hospital
- The Medical City, a Philippine hospital network
  - The Medical City Clark, in Mabalacat
  - The Medical City Ortigas, in Pasig
  - Guam Regional Medical City, in Dededo, Guam
- Sheikh Khalifa Medical City, a hospital in Abu Dhabi, United Arab Emirates
