= List of disasters in Metro Manila by death toll =

This list of disasters in Metro Manila by death toll includes both natural and man-made disasters that took place in the general vicinity of Metro Manila in the Philippines. This list is not comprehensive in general.

== Over 100,000 deaths ==
Year	Type	Fatalities	Damage (US$)	Article	Location	Comments
1945	Warfare	100,000–240,000		1945 Battle of Manila	Manila	Fatalities estimated. The city was completely destroyed.

== 10,000 to 100,000 deaths ==
Year	Type	Fatalities	Damage (US$)	Article	Location	Comments
1662	Insurrection	10,000		1662 Manila Chinese massacre	Manila	Fatalities estimated.

== 1,000 to 9,999 deaths ==
Year	Type	Fatalities	Damage (US$)	Article	Location	Comments
1603	Insurrection	5,000–25,000		1603 Manila Chinese massacre	Manila	Fatalities estimated.
1863	Earthquake	1,000		1863 Manila earthquake	Manila	Fatalities estimated.

== 100 to 999 deaths ==
Year	Type	Fatalities	Damage (US$)	Article	Location	Comments
1897	Warfare	891		Battle of Zapote Bridge	Las Piñas	
1970	Typhoon	611		Typhoon Patsy	Metro Manila	
1645	Earthquake	600		1645 Luzon earthquake	Province of Manila	
1899	Warfare	539		Second Battle of Caloocan	Caloocan	
2009	Typhoon	448		Typhoon Ketsana	Metro Manila	
1899	Warfare	293		1899 Battle of Manila	Manila	
1968	Earthquake	268		1968 Casiguran earthquake	Manila	
1762	Warfare	247		1762 Battle of Manila	Manila	
2000	Landslide	218–1,000		Payatas landslide	Quezon City	
1899	Warfare	165		Battle of Zapote River	Las Piñas	
1996	Fire	162		Ozone Disco fire	Quezon City	Recognized as the worst fire in Philippine history.
1896	Warfare	155		Battle of San Juan del Monte	San Juan	
2004	Terrorism	116		SuperFerry 14 bombing	Manila Bay	
1820	Riot	110–120		First cholera pandemic riots	Manila	

== Epidemics ==
Rank	Article	Dates of impact	Deaths	Ref.
1	Fifth cholera pandemic	1882	34,000	
2	COVID-19 pandemic	2020–2023	10,277–13,546	
3	Spanish flu pandemic	1918	5,055	
4	Sixth cholera pandemic	1902	4,386	
