= The Medical City Ortigas =

Private hospital in Pasig, Philippines

- Professional Services Inc.

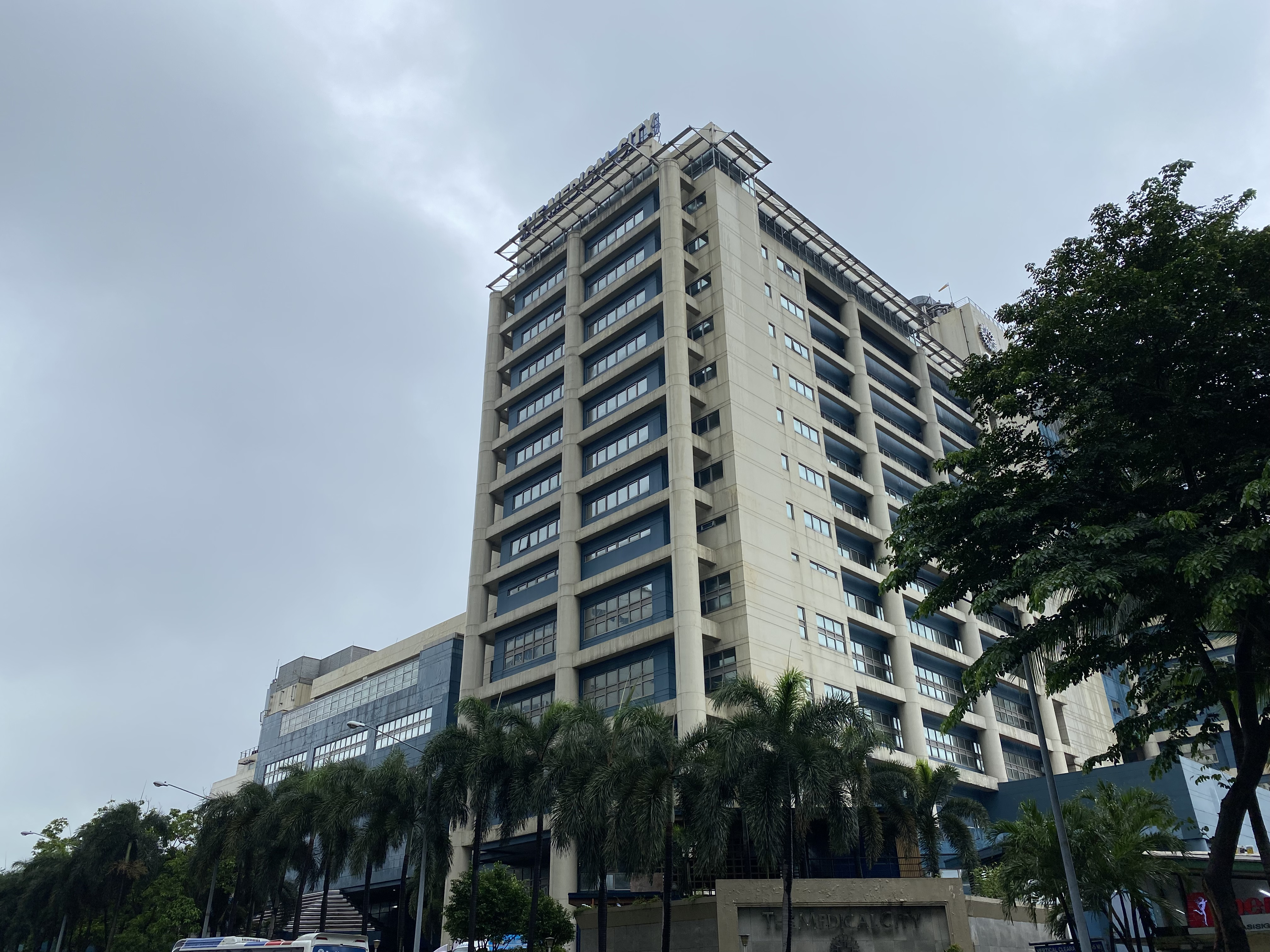
- Hospital building in 2025

Geography
- Location: Ortigas Center, Pasig, Metro Manila, Philippines
- Coordinates: 14°35′23″N 121°04′10″E

Organization
- Care system: Private
- Type: General, Teaching
- Network: TMC Network

Services
- Emergency department: Yes
- Beds: 800

History
- Constructed: 2000
- Opened: June 2004; 22 years ago

Links
- Website: themedicalcity.com

The Medical City Ortigas is a tertiary care hospital in Pasig, Metro Manila, Philippines. Opened in 2004, it is the main hospital of The Medical City (TMC) which maintains a network of hospitals and clinics which are mostly based in the Philippines.

== History ==
The original The Medical City hospital was opened as the ABM Sison Hospital in 1967 along San Miguel Avenue in Mandaluyong, The health facility was renamed as "The Medical City" or TMC in 1975.

In 2000, The Medical City began the construction of its new hospital complex on the former Meralco property along Ortigas Avenue in Pasig. The construction was worth ₱2.1 billion and was completed in 2004.

The hospital was among several hospitals in Metro Manila which catered to COVID-19 patients during the COVID-19 pandemic in the Philippines with the facility exceeding capacity at one point.

=== Notable patients ===
As one of the prominent hospitals in Metro Manila and the Philippines as a whole, The Medical City Ortigas has treated several famous Filipino public figures, and is also the place where some of them died. Notable people who died at TMC Ortigas include former cabinet secretary Manuel Yan in 2008, rapper Francis Magalona in 2009, former Quezon City mayor Mel Mathay in 2013, impeached former chief justice Renato Corona in 2016, and actress and National Artist Nora Aunor in 2025.

== Facilities ==
The hospital's main facility is located on a 1.5 ha (3.7 acres) property along Ortigas Avenue, almost within the business district of Ortigas Center in Pasig, Metro Manila. Composed of 115,000 square meters (1,240,000 sq ft) of floor space, it includes two Nursing Towers which can be fitted for up to 800 beds. The two towers are joined by a Podium, bridgeways, and a Medical Arts Tower. The 18 floors of the Medical Arts Tower house 280 doctors' clinics and select commercial spaces, while located within the six-floor Podium are diagnostic and intervention facilities, as well as support and administrative offices.

The hospital also has a three-level basement parking accommodation for over a thousand vehicles. The complex is also equipped with a broad range of security features, an advanced building management system, and biosafety features incorporated into sensitive patient areas.
