= The Medical City Clark =

Private hospital in Pampanga, Philippines

- Professional Services Inc.

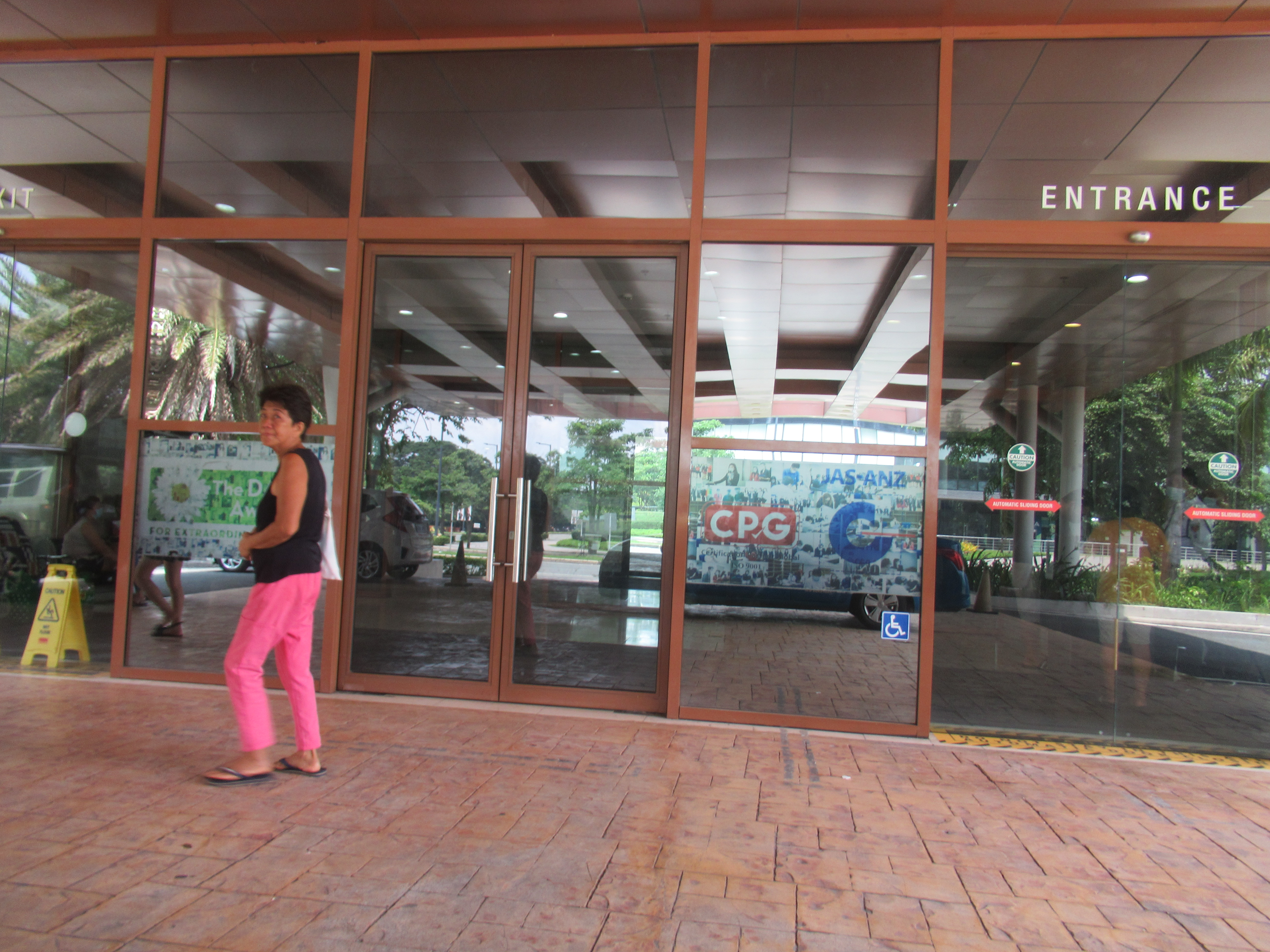

Geography
- Location: Clark Global City, Mabalacat, Pampanga, Philippines
- Coordinates: 15°10′42″N 120°34′18″E

Organization
- Care system: Private
- Type: General
- Network: TMC Network

Services
- Emergency department: Yes
- Beds: 150

History
- Constructed: 2010
- Opened: January 2015; 11 years ago

Links
- Website: themedicalcityclark.com

The Medical City Clark is a tertiary care hospital at the Clark Global City in Mabalacat, Pampanga, Philippines. It is a hospital under The Medical City (TMC) which maintains a network of hospitals and clinics which are mostly based in the Philippines.

== History ==
The groundbreaking ceremony for The Medical City Clark, which was attended by Philippine President Benigno Aquino III, took place on December 7, 2010. It was projected to be the second hospital in the Clark area and is intended by The Medical City (TMC) group to be their flagship hospital for the Central and Northern Luzon regions. The hospital opened in January 2015.

The hospital was designated as the official healthcare facility for the 2019 Southeast Asian Games which was hosted by the Philippines.

== Facilities ==
TMC Clark is a 103-bed facility which has basic general hospital facilities such as a laboratory and a radiology department. It also has specialty centers such as the Cardiovascular Center, Breast Center, Center for Occupational Health, Center for Kidney Health and Transplantation as of 2020. It also has cancer-specific facilities namely the Chemotherapy Infusion Unit and Genomics and Molecular Support unit, only lacking a Nuclear Medicine unit and a Linear Accelerator as of early 2020 which is required for a full-fledged Cancer Center.
