= State of calamity (Philippines) =

Status declared in the Philippines in response to natural disaster

State of calamity, in the context of disaster management in the Philippines, refers to a status that could be declared widespread within the country, or certain localities, in response to a destructive, natural, or man-made disaster. This measure allows the release of "calamity funds" allocated to local governments and control the pricing of basic commodities in the affected areas.

== Legal background ==
Under the Philippine Disaster Risk Reduction and Management Act of 2010 (Republic Act 10121), a "state of calamity" is defined as "a condition involving mass casualty and/or major damages to property, disruption of means of livelihoods, roads and normal way of life of people in the affected areas as a result of the occurrence of natural or human-induced hazard".

== Declaring a state of calamity ==
The National Disaster Risk Reduction and Management Council (NDRRMC) has the power to recommend to the president of the Philippines the declaration of a group of barangays, municipalities, cities, provinces, regions or the entire country under a state of calamity, and the lifting thereof, based on the criteria set by the NDRRMC. The president's declaration may warrant international humanitarian assistance as deemed necessary. A state of national calamity is effective until the president lifts it.

State of calamity could also be declared or lifted by a local government unit's sanggunian or legislature, upon the recommendation of the local disaster risk reduction and management council (LDRRMC) concerned, based damage assessment and needs analysis.

If a state of calamity is declared by the Philippine national government, the following measures will be imposed:

- Appropriation for calamity funds
- Price freeze for basic necessities
- Granting of no-interest loans.

== State of national calamities ==
The following is a list of state of national calamities declared by the president of the Philippines.

State of calamity in response to	Declared (Note: The date when the state of calamity was imposed. By default, state of national calamities remain in effect until the president lifts the status. State of calamities listed may or may not still be in effect.)	Declaring president	Basis	Notes
Super Typhoon Durian (Reming)	December 3, 2006	Gloria Macapagal Arroyo	Proclamation No. 1185	
Typhoon Ketsana (Ondoy) and Super Typhoon Parma (Pepeng)	October 2, 2009	Gloria Macapagal Arroyo	Proclamation No. 1898	
Tropical Storm Washi (Sendong)	December 20, 2011	Benigno Aquino III	Proclamation No. 303	
Super Typhoon Bopha (Pablo)	December 7, 2012	Benigno Aquino III	Proclamation No. 522	
Super Typhoon Haiyan (Yolanda)	November 11, 2013	Benigno Aquino III	Proclamation No. 682	
Typhoon Melor (Nona)	December 18, 2015	Benigno Aquino III	Proclamation No. 1186	
COVID-19 pandemic	March 16, 2020	Rodrigo Duterte	Proclamation No. 929	The State of Calamity was initially declared for six months (from March 16, 2020) but was extended through September 12, 2021 with Proclamation No. 1021. Proclamation No. 1218 subsequently extended the State of Calamity to September 12, 2022, "unless earlier lifted or extended as circumstances may warrant."
African swine fever outbreak	May 11, 2021	Rodrigo Duterte	Proclamation No. 1143	
Super Typhoon Rai (Odette)	December 21, 2021	Rodrigo Duterte	Proclamation No. 1267	
Typhoon Kalmaegi (Tino)	November 6, 2025	Bongbong Marcos	Proclamation No. 1077	

== See also ==
- Disaster area
- State of emergency
