= Valtrace =

Philippine COVID-19 app

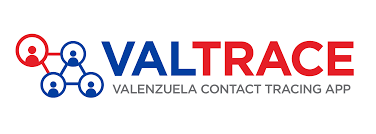
Logo of Valtrace

Valtrace is a contact tracing platform used in Valenzuela, Metro Manila. Its current role is to replace paper forms that increases possible contact with the virus. Valtrace uses QR code technology to provide contact-less tracing within the city. People who are going into the city's establishments should register to the program, in order to enter the establishment.

== Timeline ==
=== 2020 ===
==== Pre-introduction (before November 9) ====
The city government welcomed the first batch of Department of the Interior and Local Government contact tracers during a special orientation and training held in Valenzuela People's Park on October 20. The 226 newly hired contact tracers were trained in proper disease surveillance and contact tracing, handling data privacy and the use of the ValTrace App – Valenzuela's newest addition to its contact tracing platform utilizing the use of QR codes and location history.

==== November 9 – announcement ====
The government of Valenzuela, together with Mayor Rex Gatchalian, announced the upcoming use of Valtrace in the city effective November 16, 2020

laws and guidelines have also been placed to regulate the system as it follows its Role to Provide Contact Tracing under Ordinance No. 783 (ValTrace Application Ordinance) Under the ordinance, covered establishments must register with the system, scan the QR codes of all their customers and forward their customers' information to the local government after 24 hours of being offline from the system, among others.

Failure to comply will merit a ₱5,000, ₱10,000, or ₱15,000 fine, or the revocation of their business permit on the first, second, and third offense, respectively.

Any person who will provide false information about the application or will let another person use their personal QR will also be fined ₱1,000, ₱3,000, and ₱5,000 for the first, second, and third offense, respectively.

==== November 9–15 – registration period ====
Valtrace is slowly being used in the city and manual contact tracing forms can still be used.

==== November 16 – full implementation ====
Valtrace has been fully implemented in Valenzuela with manual contact tracing slowly being removed from establishments in the city.

==== December 4 – interconnecting with Pasig Pass ====
The city governments of Pasig and Valenzuela work hand to hand in streamlining solutions to help stop the spread of COVID-19 by interconnecting their systems and ensuring that the contact tracing efforts of their local governments will not go into waste. Under the agreement, Valenzuela's ValTrace App and Pasig's PasigPass will be integrated to ensure that both cities will have a more effective and efficient measures to contain the pandemic – that is, by being able to use one's ValTrace QR code to enter Pasig's establishments and vice versa. The QR codes for both cities can be used starting December 7, 2020.

==== December 7 – full interconnection with Pasigpass ====
Both PasigPass and Valtrace can now be used in both cities of Pasig and Valenzuela.

==== December 11 -Digital Governance awards ====
The city of Valenzuela has been awarded the Digital Governance Awards or DGA 2020 on its Paspas Permit and Valtrace contact tracing platform for its ease of accessibility and access. The Digital Governance Awards for 2020 was a joint project of the Department of Information and Communications Technology, Department of the Interior and Local Government, and the National ICT Confederation of the Philippines. DGA 2020 recognizes local government units for their revolutionary ICT initiatives in the delivery of public services.

=== 2021 ===
==== January 8 – interconnection with Antipolo Bantay ====
ValTrace App has been integrated with Antipolo's Bantay COVID-19 App – manifesting a continuous expansion through linkages with other local government units toward the same goal of effective contact tracing. In the following days, Pasig also signed an interconnectivity agreement with Antipolo with their contact tracing platforms.

==== January 25 -Launching VCVAX ====
VCVAX is a Sub-Program of Valtrace for vaccine registration and distribution. This sub-program aims to provide Valenzuelanos with free COVID-19 Vaccines from Oxford–AstraZeneca, and plans to vaccinate 70% of the city's population. Registration for the program is located in the Valtrace Website and open for Ages 18 and above.

==== February 23- interconnecting with Manda Track ====
ValTrace App signs a Memorandum of Agreement with Manda Track COVID-19 App together with Antipolo Bantay and Pasig Pass Full implementation on the Agreement is Set to take Effect on March 1

==== March 1- interconnection with Manda Track ====
Residents from Valenzuela, Antipolo, Mandaluyong, and Pasig can now use their local COVID-19 contact tracing application on these cities.
