= Guam Regional Medical City =

- The Medical City

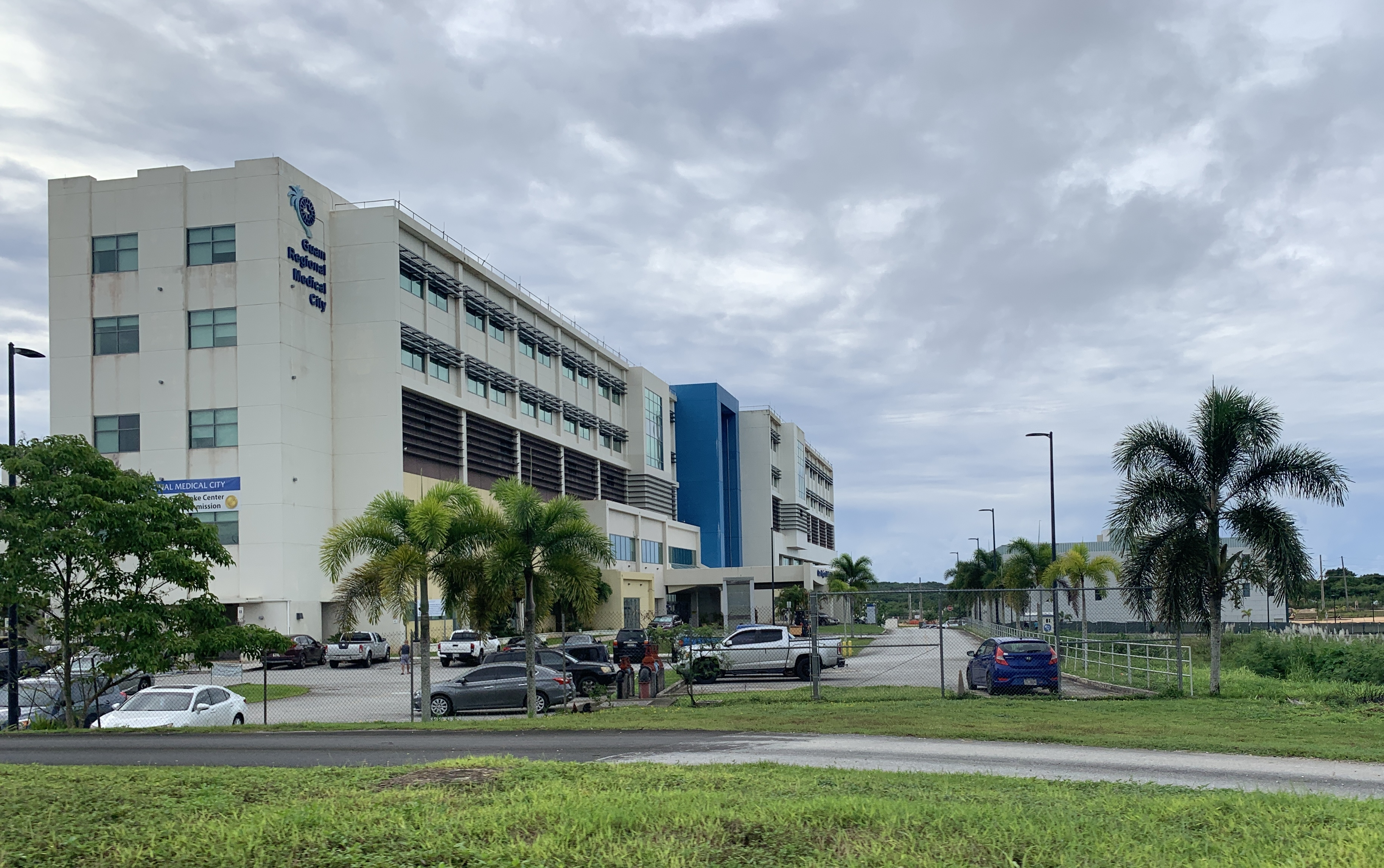

Geography
- Location: Dededo, Guam, United States
- Coordinates: 13°31′30″N 144°49′23″E

Organization
- Care system: Private
- Type: District General
- Network: TMC Network

Services
- Emergency department: Yes
- Beds: 136

History
- Constructed: 2012
- Opened: 2015

Links
- Website: www.grmc.gu
- Lists: Hospitals in Guam

The Guam Regional Medical City (GRMC) is a 136-bed private hospital in Dededo, Guam. It is managed under the Philippines-based hospital network, The Medical City. It serves the US territory of Guam as well as neighboring Micronesia, the Northern Marianas, Palau and the Marshall Islands.

== History ==
The project to construct the Guam Regional Medical City (GMRC) was first announced in 2010 with actual construction work for the hospital beginning in 2012. The GRMC was intended to open in January 2014, but the opening date was rescheduled at a later date due to various reasons including construction delays.

The GRMC opened in July 2015, becoming the first private hospital in Guam. It is also reportedly the first Philippine-owned hospital on United States territory.

In 2019, TMC opened a referral office to cater to patients seeking medical treatment outside Guam.
