= The Medical City =

Health institution based in the Philippines

- Industry: Healthcare
- Founded: 1967; 59 years ago
- Headquarters: Ortigas, Pasig, Philippines
- Area served: Philippines, Guam, Middle East
- Key people: Jose Xavier Gonzales (Chairperson); Stuart Bennett (President and Group CEO)
- Number of employees: 1,500 physicians (2021)
- Website: themedicalcity.com

Professional Services Inc. operating as The Medical City (TMC) is a health institution in the Philippines which maintains a network of hospitals and clinics in the Philippines. The TMC also maintains the Guam Regional Medical City in Guam and a network of clinics in the Gulf states.

== History ==
The Medical City first opened as the ABM Sison Hospital in 1967 along San Miguel Avenue, Mandaluyong, with a change of hospital management occurring in 1969. The health facility was renamed as "The Medical City" or TMC in 1975.

In 1996, the first outpatient clinic was opened in Antipolo, Rizal. The main hospital moved to its current location along Ortigas Avenue, Pasig in 2004. The TMC launched the Center for Patient Partnership, its flagship patient partnership program in 2007.

TMC began aggressively expanding its presence by acquiring hospitals and clinics outside Metro Manila and in the Visayas and Mindanao as well in the early 2010s.

A boardroom coup happened in September 2018, which led to CEO Alfredo Bengzon losing control of TMC. His nephew Jose Xavier Gonzales was elected as Chairperson and Eugenio Ramos was elected as CEO in a special stockholders meeting. The move was legally challenged by Bengzon with the Gonzales-Ramos side insisting Bengzon's tenure has expired and that he has less than 1 percent stakes in the company. Another election was held electing Gonzales and Ramos to the TMC's board The Securities and Exchange Commission ordered TMC in August 2020 to revert its board composition as of 2013, potentially restoring Bengzon as CEO ruling that the 2018 leadership change as illegal.

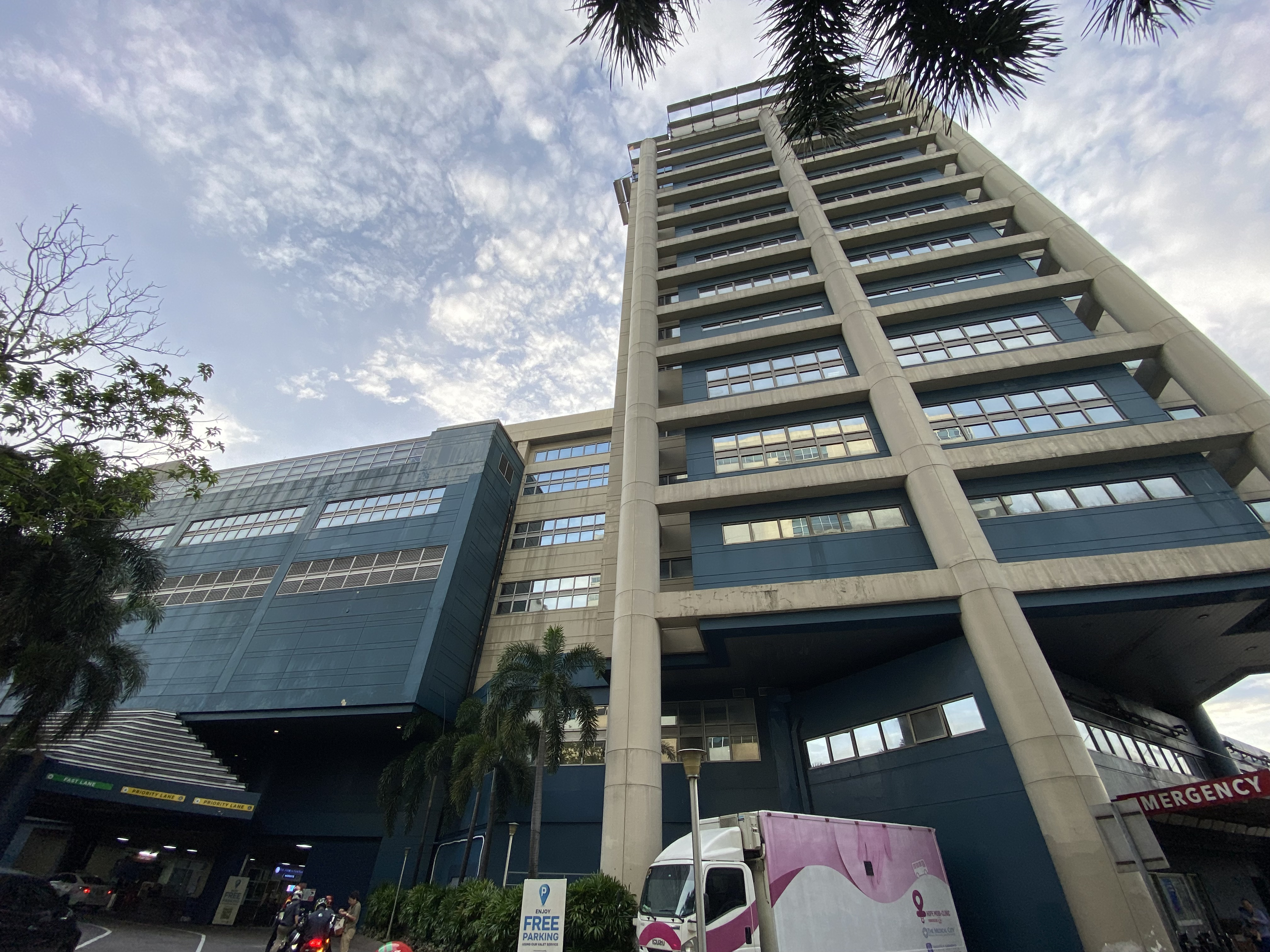
View of the Ortigas hospital building complex

During the 2020 COVID-19 pandemic in the Philippines, the TMC has accommodated patients at its main hospital in Ortigas. By April 2020, the hospital is already among the COVID-19 testing centers in the country and the TMC has entered partnership with the local governments of Pasig and Valenzuela; with the former to convert the Pasig City Children's Hospital to a COVID-19 dedicated facility and with the latter for their mass testing efforts.

== Facilities ==
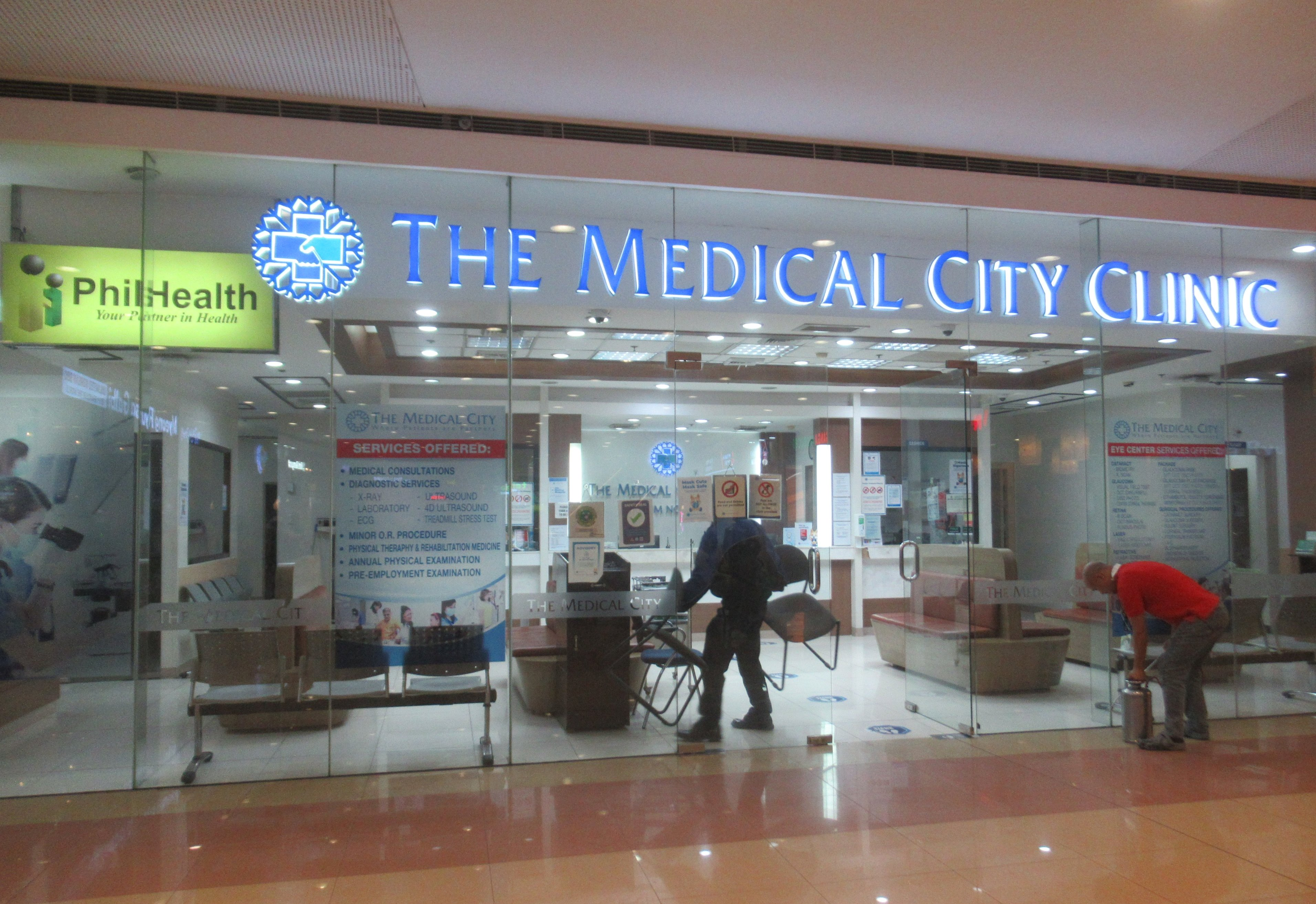
The Medical City Clinic at SM North EDSA

The hospital's main facility is located on a 1.5-hectare (3.7-acre) property along Ortigas Avenue, almost within the business district of Ortigas Center in Pasig, Metro Manila.

TMC also serves as the hub for a network of satellite clinics and hospitals that delivers a range of diagnostic and therapeutic services to patients in Manila and select provinces.

It also operates the Guam Regional Medical City, the first private hospital in Guam as well as clinics in the Gulf Cooperation Council countries.

In 2021, TMC entered in a partnership with Ascent enabling it to transport patients, medical personnel, and sensitive cargo between TMC's hospitals and Ascent's hubs using Ascent's on-demand helicopter services.

=== Hospitals ===
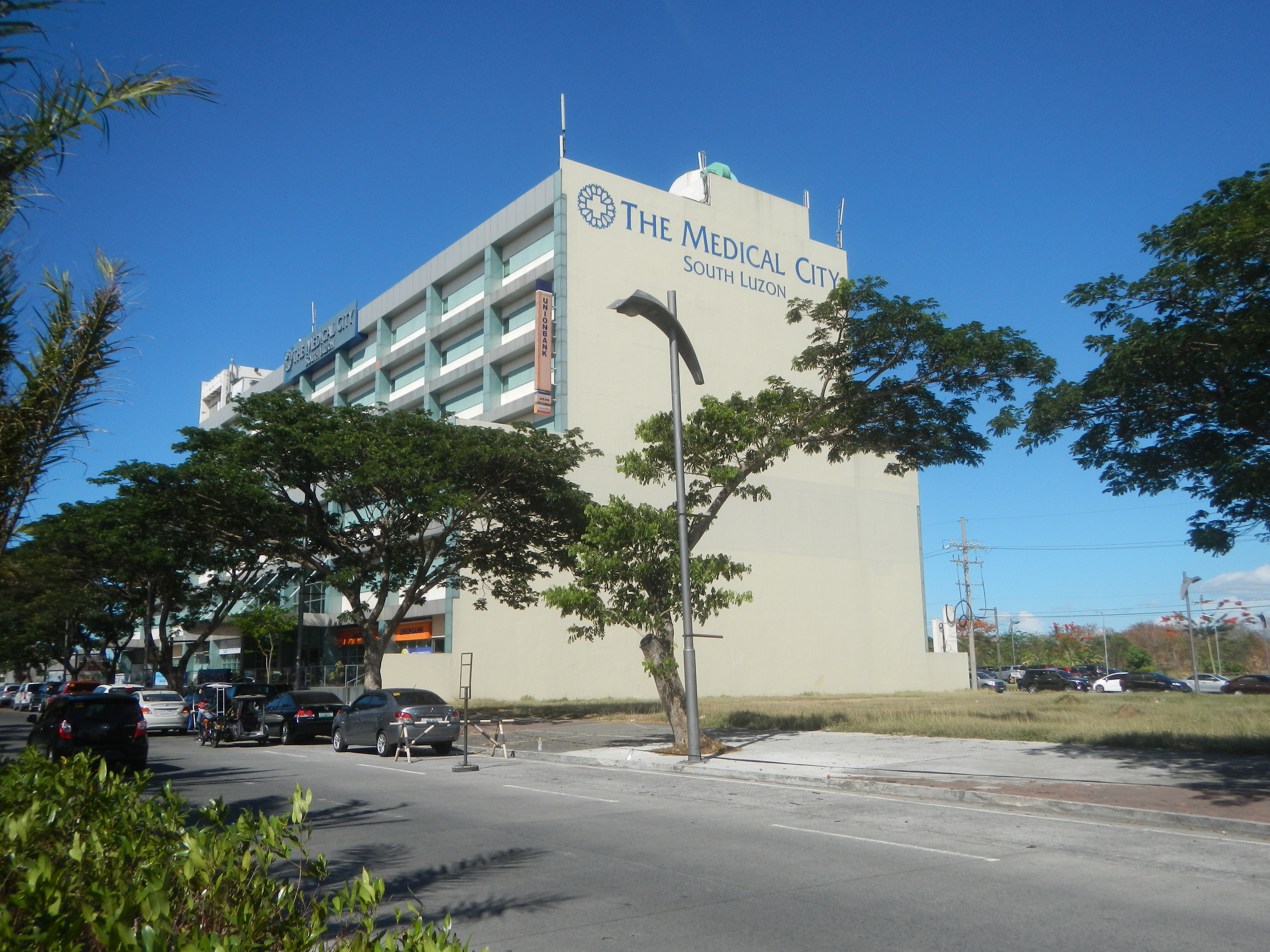
The Medical City South Luzon in Santa Rosa, Laguna

- The Medical City Ortigas – Pasig
- The Medical City Clark – Clark Freeport Zone (Mabalacat)
- The Medical City Iloilo – Iloilo City
- The Medical City Pangasinan – Dagupan
- The Medical City South Luzon – Santa Rosa, Laguna
- Guam Regional Medical City – Dededo, Guam
