= List of hospitals in the Philippines =

This is a partial list of notable hospitals in the Philippines.

== NCR Metro Manila Center for Health Development ==
=== Government hospitals ===
Name of Hospital	Location	Class
Caloocan City Medical Center	450 A. Mabini St., Caloocan	LGU
Ospital ng Malabon	F. Sevilla Boulevard, Tañong, Malabon	LGU
San Lorenzo Ruiz General Hospital	O. Reyes St., Rosita Subdivision, Santulan, Malabon	DOH Retained
Gat Andres Bonifacio Memorial Medical Center	8001 Delpan St., Tondo, Manila	LGU
Ospital ng Tondo	Jose Abad Santos Avenue, Tondo, Manila	LGU
Justice Jose Abad Santos General Hospital	Numancia St., Binondo, Manila	LGU
Ospital ng Sampaloc	677 Geronimo St., cor. Carola St., Sampaloc, Manila	LGU
Navotas City Hospital	M. Naval St., Brgy. San Jose, Navotas	LGU
Ospital ng Parañaque	0440 Quirino Ave., La Huerta, Parañaque	LGU
Ospital ng Parañaque District II	187 Taiwan Extension Corner Doña Soledad Avenue, Don Bosco, Parañaque	LGU
Novaliches District Hospital	Quirino Highway, San Bartolome, Novaliches, Quezon City	LGU
San Juan Medical Center	N. Domingo St., San Juan	LGU
Army General Hospital	Fort Andres Bonifacio, Taguig	AFP
Manila Naval Hospital	Naval Station, Jose Francisco, Fort Bonifacion, Taguig	AFP
Taguig City General Hospital	C-6 Road, Hagonoy, Taguig	LGU
Taguig–Pateros District Hospital	East Service Road, Western Bicutan, Taguig	LGU
Santa Ana Hospital	New Panaderos St., Sta. Ana, Manila	LGU
Mandaluyong City Medical Center	C3 Road F. Martinez Avenue, Barangay Addition Hills, Mandaluyong	LGU
Air Force General Hospital	Gozar St., Colonel Jesus Villamor Air Base, Pasay	PAF
Pasig City Children's Hospital – Child's Hope	Industria St. cor. Alcalde Jose St., Kapasigan, Pasig	LGU
PNP General Hospital	Camp Crame, Quezon City	PNP
Rosario Maclang Bautista General Hospital	IBP Road, Batasan Hills, District 2, Quezon City	LGU
Dr. Jose N. Rodriguez Memorial Hospital and Sanitarium	St. Joseph Avenue (Dr. Uyguanco Street), Tala, Caloocan	DOH Retained
Las Piñas General Hospital and Satellite Trauma Center	Bernabe Compound, Pulanglupa, Las Piñas	DOH Retained
Dr. Jose Fabella Memorial Hospital	Lope de Vega St., Sta. Cruz, Manila	DOH Retained
Jose R. Reyes Memorial Medical Center	San Lazaro Compound, Rizal Avenue, Sta. Cruz, Manila	DOH Retained
San Lazaro Hospital	Quiricada St., Sta. Cruz, Manila	DOH Retained
Tondo Medical Center	Honorio Lopez Boulevard., Balut, Tondo, Manila	DOH Retained
Philippine General Hospital	Taft Avenue, Ermita, Manila	University
Ospital ng Maynila Medical Center	Pres. Quirino Avenue, cor. Roxas Blvd., Malate, Manila	LGU
National Center for Mental Health	#9 De Febrero St., Mandaluyong	DOH Retained
Ospital ng Makati	Sampaguita St. cor. Gumamela St., Brgy. Pembo, Taguig	LGU
Amang Rodriguez Memorial Medical Center	Sumulong Highway, Brgy. Sto. Niño, Marikina	DOH Retained
Ospital ng Muntinlupa	Civic Drive, Filinvest Corporate City, Alabang, Muntinlupa	LGU
Research Institute for Tropical Medicine	Filinvest Corporate City, Alabang, Muntinlupa	DOH Retained
Pasay City General Hospital	P. Burgos St., Pasay	LGU
Rizal Medical Center	Pasig Boulevard, Bagong Ilog, Pasig	DOH Retained
Pasig City General Hospital	M. Eusebio Avenue, Maybunga, Pasig	LGU
Veterans Memorial Medical Center	North Avenue, Diliman, Quezon City	DND
Philippine Heart Center	East Avenue, Diliman, Quezon City	GOCC
National Kidney and Transplant Institute	East Avenue, Diliman, Quezon City	GOCC
Philippine Children's Medical Center	Quezon Avenue corner Senator Miriam P. Defensor-Santiago Avenue, Diliman, Quezon City	GOCC
Victoriano Luna Medical Center	V. Luna Road, Quezon City	AFP
East Avenue Medical Center	East Avenue, Quezon City	DOH Retained
Philippine Orthopedic Center	Ma. Clara St. cor. Banawe St., Quezon City	DOH Retained
Quezon City General Hospital	Seminary Road, EDSA, Quezon City	LGU
Lung Center of the Philippines	Quezon Avenue, Quezon City	GOCC
National Children’s Hospital	#226 E. Rodriguez Sr. Boulevard, Quezon City	DOH Retained
Quirino Memorial Medical Center	Katipunan Road, Project 4, Quezon City	DOH Retained
Valenzuela Medical Center	Padrigal St., Karuhatan, Valenzuela	DOH Retained

=== Private hospitals ===
Name of Hospital	Location
Diliman Doctors Hospital, Inc.	251 Commonwealth Avenue, Matandang Balara, Quezon City
Providence Hospital, Inc.	1515 Quezon Avenue, West Triangle, Quezon City
Dr. Jesus C. Delgado Memorial Hospital	#7 Kamuning Road, Quezon City
Bernardino General Hospital I	#680 Quirino Highway, San Bartolome, Novaliches, Quezon City
Metro North Medical Center and Hospital, Inc.	1001 Mindanao Avenue, Brgy. Bahay Toro, Quezon City
Commonwealth Hospital and Medical Center	Neopolitan Business Park, Regalado Highway, Brgy. Greater Lagro, Novaliches, District 2, Quezon City
Allied Care Experts (ACE) Medical Center-Quezon City, Inc.	No. 20 Seminary Road, Bahay Toro, Project 8, Quezon City
Pacific Global Medical Center, Inc.	Lot 2b, Mindanao Avenue, Brgy. Talipapa, Novaliches, Quezon City
F.Y. Manalo Medical Foundation, Inc.	Commonwealth Ave. cor. Tandang Sora Ave., Quezon City
Pope John Paul II Hospital and Medical Center Inc.	545-E Alabang-Zapote Road, Brgy. Talon III, Las Piñas City
Christ the King Medical Center Unihealth Las Piñas, Inc.	130 Real St., Pamplona 1, Las Piñas City
Las Piñas City Medical Center, Inc.	#1314 Marcos Alvarez Ave., Talon V, Las Piñas City
St. Clare’s Medical Center, Inc.	#1838 Dian St., Palanan, Makati City
St. Anthony Medical Center of Marikina, Inc.	32 Sta. Ana Ext. cor. Betelnut St., San Roque, Marikina City
Marikina St. Vincent General Hospital, Inc.	#35 Bayan-Bayanan Avenue, Concepcion Uno, Marikina City
Marikina Valley Medical Center, Inc.	Sumulong Highway cor. Aguinaldo St., Brgy. Santo Niño, Marikina City
Medical Center Muntinlupa, Inc.	38 National Road, Putatan, Muntinlupa City
The Premier Medical Center	Lot 2 Amvel Business Park, Dr. A. Santos Ave., Brgy. San Dionisio, Sucat Road, Parañaque City
UHBI-Parañaque Doctors Hospital, Inc.	#175 Doña Soledad Ave., Betterliving Subd., Parañaque City
Unihealth Parañaque Hospital and Medical Center, Inc.	Dr. A. Santos Avenue, Brgy. San Isidro, Sucat Road, Parañaque City
Tricity Medical Center, Inc.	269 C. Raymundo Avenue, Maybunga, Pasig City
Pasig Doctors Medical Center Inc.	254 Amang Rodriguez Avenue, Manggahan, Pasig City
St. Camillus Medical Center	116 E. Amang Rodriguez Avenue, Santolan, Pasig City
Allied Care Experts (ACE) Medical Center-Pateros, Inc.	884 P. Herrera St., Aguho, Pateros, Metro Manila
Medical Center of Taguig City, Inc.	Lot 1B - Levi B. Mariano Avenue, Barangay Ususan, Taguig City
Valenzuela Citicare Medical Center-Timog Hilaga Providence Group, Inc.	Km 14 McArthur Highway, Malinta, Valenzuela City
Allied Care Experts (ACE) Medical Center Valenzuela, Inc.	548 McArthur Highway, Malanday, Valenzuela
Mary Johnston Hospital, Inc.	1221 Juan Nolasco St., Tondo, Manila
Seamen’s Hospital	Cabildo St. cor. San Jose St., Intramuros, Manila
Hospital of the Infant Jesus Medical Center	#1556 Laon Laan Road, Sampaloc, Manila
Medical Center Manila, Inc.	850 United Nations Avenue, Ermita, Manila
Chinese General Hospital	#286 Blumentritt St., Sta. Cruz, Manila
St. Jude General Hospital & Medical Center, Inc.	Don Quijote cor. Dimasalang St., Sampaloc, Manila
University of Santo Tomas Hospital	España Boulevard, Manila
Our Lady of Lourdes Hospital	#46 P. Sanchez St., Sta. Mesa, Manila
Mary Chiles General Hospital, Inc.	667 Gastambide St., Sampaloc, Manila
Manila Doctors Hospital	#667 United Nations Ave., Ermita, Manila
Metropolitan Medical Center	#1357 G. Masangkay St., Sta. Cruz, Manila
Manila Central University (MCU) - Dr. Filemon D. Tanchoco, Sr. Medical Foundation, Inc.	EDSA, Caloocan City
World Citi Medical Center	#960 Aurora Blvd., Brgy. Bagumbayan, Quezon City
St. Luke's Medical Center – Quezon City	#279 E. Rodriguez Sr. Blvd., Quezon City
Ramon Magsaysay Memorial Medical Center	Aurora Boulevard, Quezon City
De Los Santos Medical Center	#201 E. Rodriguez Sr. Blvd., Quezon City
Dr. Fe del Mundo Medical Center	11 Banawe St., Brgy. Doña Josefa, Quezon City
United Doctors Medical Center	#6 N. Ramirez St., Brgy. Don Manuel, Quezon City
Capitol Medical Center	Quezon Ave. cor. Sct. Magbanua, Quezon City
Far Eastern University Hospital	Regalado Avenue cor. Dahlia, West Fairview, Quezon City
Las Piñas Doctors Hospital, Inc.	#8009 JI Aguilar Ave., Pulanglupa 2, Las Piñas City
University of Perpetual Help Dalta Medical Center, Inc.	Alabang-Zapote Road, Las Piñas City
Makati Medical Center	#2 Amorsolo St., Legaspi Village, Makati City
Dr. Victor R. Potenciano Medical Center	#163 EDSA, Mandaluyong City
Asian Hospital and Medical Center	#2205 Civic Drive, Filinvest Corporate City Alabang, Muntinlupa City
Adventist Medical Center Manila	#1975 Donada St., Pasay City
San Juan de Dios Hospital	2772 Roxas Blvd., Pasay City
The Medical City Ortigas	The Medical City, Don Eugenio Lopez Sr. Medical Complex, Ortigas Avenue, Brgy. Ugong, Pasig City
Cardinal Santos Medical Center	10 Wilson St., Greenhills, San Juan City
St. Luke’s Medical Center - Global City	Rizal Drive corner 32nd Street and 5th Avenue, Bonifacio Global City, Taguig
Fatima University Medical Center Corporation	

== Region 1 Ilocos Center for Health Development ==
=== Government hospitals ===
Name of Hospital	Location	Class
Bangui District Hospital	Barangay Abaca, Bangui, Ilocos Norte	LGU
Laoag City General Hospital	Airport Road, Barangay 46 Nalbo, Laoag City, Ilocos Norte	LGU
Ilocos Sur District Hospital - Bessang Pass Cervantes	National Road, Cervantes, Ilocos Sur	LGU
Ilocos Sur District Hospital - Narvacan	Paratong, Narvacan, Ilocos Sur	LGU
Ilocos Sur District Hospital- Magsingal	Sta. Monica, Magsingal, Ilocos Sur	LGU
Ilocos Sur District Hospital - Sinait	Maharlika Highway, Curtin, Sinait, Ilocos Sur	LGU
Ilocos Sur District Hospital - Sta. Lucia	National Highway, San Juan, Sta. Lucia, Ilocos Sur	LGU
Bacnotan District Hospital	Poblacion, Bacnotan, La Union	LGU
Balaoan District Hospital	Bungol, Balaoan, La Union	LGU
Caba District Hospital	National Highway, Poblacion Sur, Caba, La Union	LGU
Naguilian District Hospital	Natividad, Naguilian, La Union	LGU
Rosario District Hospital	Concepcion, Rosario, La Union	LGU
Asingan Community Hospital	Bypass Road, Dupac, Asingan, Pangasinan	LGU
Bayambang District Hospital	Bical Norte, Bayambang, Pangasinan	LGU
Bolinao Community Hospital	Sampaloc, Bolinao, Pangasinan	LGU
Dasol Community Hospital	Bobonot, Dasol, Pangasinan	LGU
Eastern Pangasinan District Hospital	New Magallanes, Tayug, Pangasinan	LGU
Lingayen District Hospital	V. Solis Street, Poblacion, Lingayen, Pangasinan	LGU
Manaoag Community Hospital	Baritao, Manaoag, Pangasinan	LGU
Mangatarem District Hospital	Casilagan, Mangatarem, Pangasinan	LGU
Mapandan Community Hospital	24 Fire Tree Street, Poblacion, Mapandan, Pangasinan	LGU
Pozorrubio Community Hospital	Talogtog, Pozorrubio, Pangasinan	LGU
Umingan Community Hospital	Burgos Street, Poblacion West, Umingan, Pangasinan	LGU
Western Pangasinan District Hospital	Sabaro, Poblacion, Alaminos City, Pangasinan	LGU
Urdaneta District Hospital	Dilan Paurido, Urdaneta City, Pangasinan	LGU
Gov. Roque B. Ablan Sr. Memorial Hospital	Brgy. 23 San Matias, P. Gomez St., Laoag City, Ilocos Norte	LGU
Ilocos Sur Provincial Hospital Gabriela Silang	Quirino Blvd., Tamag, Vigan City, Ilocos Sur	LGU
La Union Medical Center	Nazareno, Agoo, La Union	LGU
Pangasinan Provincial Hospital	Bolingit, San Carlos City, Pangasinan	LGU
Mariano Marcos Memorial Hospital and Medical Center	Barangay 6, San Julian, Batac, Ilocos Norte	DOH Retained
Ilocos Training and Regional Medical Center	Barangay Parian, San Fernando City, La Union	DOH Retained
Region I Medical Center	Arellano St., Dagupan City	DOH Retained

=== Private hospitals ===
Name of Hospital	Location
The Black Nazarene Hospital, Inc.	29 Bonoan St., Barangay 2, San Nicolas, Ilocos Norte
Sta. Teresita Hospital, Inc.	Brgy. Fortuna, Marcos, Ilocos Norte
Metro Vigan Hospital	Roxas Dike, Bantay, Ilocos Sur
Northside Doctors Hospital	Guimod, Bantay, Ilocos Sur
Bethany Hospital, Inc.	Widdoes St., Brgy. II, San Fernando City, La Union
Jesus Nazarene General Hospital	Solis Street, Lingayen, Pangasinan
Tayug Family Hospital	Barangobong, Tayug, Pangasinan
Universal Health General Hospital	Brgy. Cabatling, Malasiqui, Pangasinan
Nazareth General Hospital, Inc.	203 Perez Boulevard, Dagupan City
Luzon Medical Center, Inc.	329 MacArthur Highway, Brgy. Tapuac, Dagupan City
Dagupan Doctors Villaflor Memorial Hospital, Inc.	McArthur Highway, Mayombo District, Dagupan City, Pangasinan
Specialist Group Hospital and Trauma Center	Tapuac District, Dagupan City, Pangasinan
The Medical City Pangasinan	Nable St., Dagupan City, Pangasinan
Medical Centrum Dagupan	A.B. Fernandez Avenue, East Dagupan City, Pangasinan
Elguira General Hospital	259 Rizal Avenue, San Carlos City, Pangasinan
Blessed Family Doctors General Hospital	Barangay Ilang, San Carlos City, Pangasinan
Pangasinan Doctors Hospital	Rizal Avenue, San Carlos City, Pangasinan
Virgen Milagrosa Medical Center	Martin P. Posadas Avenue, San Carlos City, Pangasinan
Urdaneta Sacred Heart Hospital, Inc.	McArthur Highway, San Vicente, Urdaneta City, Pangasinan
Lorma Medical Center, Inc.	Carlatan, San Fernando City, La Union

== Region 2 Cagayan Valley Center for Health Development ==
=== Government hospitals ===
Name of Hospital	Location	Class
Batanes General Hospital	National Road, Kayhuvokan, Basco, Batanes	DOH Retained
Alfonso Ponce Enrile Memorial District Hospital	Brgy. Smart, Gonzaga, Cagayan	LGU
Aparri Provincial Hospital	National Highway, Toran, Aparri, Cagayan	LGU
Ballesteros District Hospital	Cabuluan West, Ballesteros, Cagayan	LGU
Lasam District Hospital	Ignacio B. Jurado, Lasam, Cagayan	LGU
Matilde A. Olivas District Hospital	Gen. Batalla, Camalaniugan, Cagayan	LGU
Nuestra Señora De Piat District Hospital	Maguilling, Piat, Cagayan	LGU
Tuao District Hospital	Purok 4, Bulagao, Tuao, Cagayan	LGU
Tuguegarao City People's General Hospital	Luna St., Centro 6, Tuguegarao City, Cagayan	LGU
Echague District Hospital	Ipil, Echague, Isabela	LGU
Governor Faustino N. Dy Sr. Memorial Hospital	Maharlika Road, Calamagui 2nd, Ilagan, Isabela	LGU
Manuel A. Roxas District Hospital	National Highway, San Antonio, Roxas, Isabela	LGU
San Mariano Community Hospital	Sta. Filomena, San Mariano, Isabela	LGU
Milagros Albano District Hospital	Ngarag, Cabagan, Isabela	LGU
Prospero G. Bello Integrated Community Hospital	Brgy. 1, Jones, Isabela	LGU
Cauayan District Hospital	Rosemarie Reyes St., Cauayan City, Isabela	LGU
City of Ilagan Medical Center	Brgy. Lullutan, City of Ilagan, Isabela	LGU
Maddela District Hospital	Diduyon, Maddela, Quirino	LGU
Quirino Province Medical Center	National Highway, Mangandingay, Cabarroguis, Quirino	LGU
Dupax District Hospital	Malasin, Dupax del Norte, Nueva Vizcaya	LGU
Lt. Tidang Memorial Hospital	Pampang, Kayapa, Nueva Vizcaya	LGU
Nueva Vizcaya Provincial Hospital	Almaguer North, Bambang, Nueva Vizcaya	LGU
Cagayan Valley Medical Center	Maharlika Highway, Carig Sur, Tuguegarao City, Cagayan	DOH Retained
Southern Isabela Medical Center	Corner Recto Avenue, Zamora St., Rosario, Santiago City, Isabela	DOH Retained
Region II Trauma and Medical Center	Magsaysay, Bayombong, Nueva Vizcaya	DOH Retained

=== Private hospitals ===
Name of Hospital	Location
Grupo Medico De Dios, Inc.	Bulala, Camalaniugan, Cagayan
Dr. Ronald P. Guzman Medical Center, Inc.	Enrile Ave., Carig, Tuguegarao City
St. Paul Hospital Of Tuguegarao, Inc.	Luna Extension, Ugac Norte, Tuguegarao City, Cagayan
Divine Mercy Wellness Center, Inc.	Arellano cor. Burgos Sts., Brgy. Centro 06, Tuguegarao City, Cagayan
Cagayan United Doctors Medical Center of Tuguegarao City, Inc.	7 Bagay Road, Caritan Centro, Tuguegarao City, Cagayan
Isabela United Doctors Medical Center, Inc.	National Highway, Brgy. Cabaruan, Cauayan City, Isabela
De Vera Medical Center, Inc.	City Road, Calao Est, Santiago City, Isabela
Callang General Hospital and Medical Center, Inc.	Judge Taguinod St., Centro East, Santiago City, Isabela
Adventist Hospital-Santiago City, Inc.	Purok 5, National Highway, Mabini, Santiago City, Isabela
Santiago Medical City	Purok 7, National Road, Rizal, Santiago City, Isabela
PLTC, Inc. Luis A. Tiam Medical Center	Brgy. Basacaran, Solano, Nueva Vizcaya
Salubris, Inc.	National Highway, Brgy. Roxas, Solano, Nueva Vizcaya

== Region 3 Central Luzon Center for Health Development ==
=== Government hospitals ===
Name of Hospital	Location	Class
Aurora Memorial Hospital	San Luis Street, Poblacion, Baler	LGU
Jose C. Payumo Jr. Memorial Hospital	San Ramon, Dinalupihan	LGU
Mariveles District Hospital	Ave. of the Phils, Freeport Area of Bataan	LGU
Orani District Hospital	Lourdes Street Ma.Fe Subd., Orani	LGU
Baliuag District Hospital	Carpa Village, Sabang, Baliuag	LGU
Calumpit District Hospital	Caniogan, Calumpit	LGU
Emilio G. Perez Memorial Hospital	Toma Cruz St. Sto. Nino, Hagonoy, Bulacan	LGU
Gregorio Del Pilar District Hospital	Bagumbayan, Bulakan, Bulacan	LGU
Norzagaray Municipal Hospital	Mun. Compound Pob.	LGU
Ospital ng Guiguinto	Tabe, Guiguinto, Bulacan	LGU
Rogaciano M. Mercado Memorial Hospital	Poblacion, Sta.Maria	LGU
San Miguel District Hospital	Sta. Rita old, San Miguel	LGU
Ospital ng Lungsod ng San Jose Del Monte	Bagong Buhay I, San Jose del Monte City	LGU
Bongabon District Hospital	De Lara Street, Brgy Curva, Bongabon, N.E.	LGU
Gapan District Hospital	Bayanihan, Gapan	LGU
Guimba District Hospital	Pacac, Guimba, Nueva Ecija	LGU
San Antonio District Hospital	San Mariano, San Antonio	LGU
Sto. Domingo District Hospital	Prov. Rd., Pulong Bule, Sto. Domingo	LGU
E.L. Joson Memorial Hospital	Maharlika Hi-way, Daan Sarile,	LGU
Mv Gallego Cabanatuan City General Hospital	Maharlika Hi-way, Cabanatuan City, N.E.	LGU
San Jose City General Hospital	Maharlika Hi-way, Brgy.Malasin, San Jose City	LGU
Ospital ng Lungsod ng San Jose	A.O Pascual St., San Jose City, San Mariano, San Antonio	LGU
Airforce City Hospital	Ninoy Aquino Ave.Clark Airbase, Clark	AFP
Basa Airbase Hospital	Basa Airbase, Floridablanca	AFP
Diosdado P. Macapagal Memorial Hospital	Sta. Rita, Guagua	LGU
Dr. Andres Luciano Jr. Memorial Hospital	San Pablo, Magalang	LGU
Dr. Emigdio C. Cruz Sr. Memorial Hospital	San Agustin Norte, Arayat	LGU
Escolastica Romero District Hospital	Plaza, San Nicolas 1st, Poblacion, Lubao	LGU
Jose Songco Lapid District Hospital	Babo Sacan, Porac	LGU
Mabalacat District Hospital	Dau, Mabalacat	LGU
Mexico Community Hospital	Mexico-Magalang Rd, San Carlos, Mexico	LGU
Romana Pangan District Hospital	San Jose, Floridablanca	LGU
R.P. Rodriguez Memorial Hospital	Bulaon Resettlement CSFP	LGU
San Luis District Hospital	Sta. Lucia, San Luis	LGU
Rafael Lazatin Memorial Medical Center	Villa Rosario, Pampang, Angeles City, Pampanga	LGU
Camp Aquino Station Hospital	Camp Gen. S. Aquino San Miguel, Tarlac	AFP
Concepcion District Hospital	St. Jude Village, Brgy. Alfonso, Concepcion	LGU
Congressman Enrique "Henry" M. Cojuangco Memorial District Hospital	San Julian, Moncada, Tarlac	LGU
Gilberto O. Teodoro Memorial Hospital	Brgy. Malacampa, Camiling	LGU
La Paz Medicare And Community Hospital	Catalan St. San Roque, La Paz	LGU
Paniqui General Hospital	Brgy. Samput, Paniqui, Tarlac	LGU
Ospital ning Capas	Municipal Comp., Sto. Domingo 2nd, Capas	LGU
Candelaria District Hospital	Yamot, Candelaria	LGU
San Marcelino District Hospital	Sto. Domingo, San Marcelino, Olongapo City	LGU
Talavera General Hospital	Maestrang Kikay, Talavera, N.E.	DOH Retained
President Ramon Magsaysay Memorial Hospital	Palanginan, Iba, Zambales	LGU
Bataan General Hospital and Medical Center	Manahan Street, Tenejero, Balanga City, Bataan	DOH Retained
Bulacan Medical Center	99 Potenciano St., Mojon Road, Malolos City, Bulacan	LGU
Dr. Paulino J. Garcia Memorial Research and Medical Center	Mabini Street, Cabanatuan City	DOH Retained
Jose B. Lingad Memorial General Hospital	Dolores, City of San Fernando, Pampanga	DOH Retained
Tarlac Provincial Hospital	Hospital Drive, San Vicente, Tarlac City	LGU
James L. Gordon Memorial Hospital	No. 1 Perimeter Road, New Asinan, Olongapo City, Zambales	LGU

=== Private hospitals ===
Name of Hospital	Location
Premiere General Hospital of Nueva Ecija, Baler Aurora, Inc.	Brgy. Suklayin, Baler, Aurora
Bataan Doctors Hospital and Medical Center, Inc.	Cuaderno Street, Doña Francisca Subdivision, Balanga City, Bataan
Bataan St. Joseph Hospital & Medical Center Corp.	Don Manuel Banzon Ave., Brgy. Doña Francisca, Balanga City, Bataan
Centro Medico De Santisimo Rosario, Inc.	Lot 1 PSD 25823 Roman, National Highway, Brgy. Tenejero, Balanga City, Bataan
St. Paul Hospital Bulacan, Inc.	187 J.P. Rizal St., Binang II, Bocaue, Bulacan
Allied Care Experts (Ace) Medical Center-Baliwag, Inc.	Lot 2975 C-1 Dona Remedios Trinidad Highway, Brgy.
Marcelo-Padilla Children’S And Medical Hospital Corporation	#393 Banga I, Plaridel, Bulacan
Our Lady Of Mercy General Hospital, Inc.	Dona Remedios Trinidad Highway, Longos, Pulilan, Bulacan
Sacred Heart Hosp of Malolos Inc.	Dr. Peralta St. Guinhawa subd. City of Malolos city, Bulacan
Nazarenus College And Hospital Foundation, Inc.	Boundary of Kaliwa and Saluysoy, McArthur Highway, Marilao and Meycauayan, Bulacan
Meycauayan Doctors Hospital and Medical Center, Inc.	Km 18, McArthur Highway, Banga, Meycauayan City, Bulacan
Qualimed Health Network Sjdm	Altaraza, Tungkong Mangga, City of San Jose Del Monte, Bulacan
Grace General Hospital, Inc	B1 L2 Quirino Highway Ext., Brgy Mulawin Francsico Homes, City of San Jose Del Monte, Bulacan
Skyline Hospital and Medical Center	Skyline Drive cor. Qurino Highway, Brgy. Tungkong Mannga, City of San Jose Del Monte
Pampanga Medical Specialist Hospital, Inc.	Km. 80, Jose Abad Santos Ave., San Antonio, Guagua, Pampanga
Rosario Memorial Hospital of Guagua Inc.	San Roque Guagua Pampanga
St. Raphael Foundation & Medical Center, Inc.	Purok 5, McArthur Hi-way, Canidha Subd., Camachiles, Mabalacat, Pampanga
The Medical City Clark	100 Gatwick Gateway Sabah Al-Ahmad Global Gateway Logistics City, Ind’l Estate 5, Clark Freeport Zone, Pampanga
Floridablanca Doctors’ Hospital, Inc.	Valdez, Floridablanca, Pampanga
Pampanga Premier Medical Center Inc.	McArthur Highway, Brgy. Sampaloc, Apalit, Pampanga
St. Catherine of Alexandria Foundation & Medical Center	#4163 Rizal Street Ext., Cut- cut, Angeles City
Pri Medical Center	Blk 6 Lot 11, Arayat Blvd., Brgy. Pampang, Angeles City, Pampanga
Ac Sacred Heart Medical Center	MacArthur Highway, Brgy. Sto. Domingo, Angeles City, Pampanga
Angeles Medical Center, Inc.	#641 Rizal Street, Lourdes Sur, Angeles City
Dr. Amando L. Garcia Medical Center, Inc.	#648 Rizal St., Agapito del Rosario, Angeles City, Pampanga
Mother Teresa of Calcutta Medical Center	MacArthur Highway Brgy. Maimpis, City of San Fernando, Pampanga
V.L. Makabali Memorial Hospital, Inc.	B. Mendoza Street, Sto. Rosario, City of San Fernando, Pampanga
Greencity Medical Center	Jose Abad Santos Road Brgy. Dolores, City of San Fernando Pampanga
Nueva Ecija Medical Center, Inc.	Maharlika Hi-way, San Antonio, San Leonardo Nueva Ecija
Nueva Ecija Doctors Hospital Inc.	Maharlika Hi-way, Sumacab Este, Cabanatuan City
Wesleyan University - Philippines	Tandang Sora Street, Mabini Extension, Cabanatuan City
Nueva Ecija Good Samaritan Health System, Inc.	Burgos Avenue, Brgy. Sangitan, Cabanatuan City
Immaculate Conception Medical Center of Central Luzon, Inc.	Circumferential Road, San Juan Accfa, Cabanatuan City, Nueva Ecija
Nueva Ecija Good Samaritan Health System, Inc. (Ext.)	San Vicente, Bucana, Gapan City, Nueva Ecija
Señor Sto. Niño Hospital, Inc.	P. Burgos Street, Poblacion B., Camiling, Tarlac
Capas Medical Center	MacArthur Highway, Brgy. Sto. Domingo 2nd, Capas, Tarlac
Loving Mother General Hospital and Diagnostic Center Inc.	Block 6, F. Tanedo St., San Nicolas, Tarlac City, Tarlac
Talon General Hospital	F. Tañedo Street, Poblacion, Tarlac City
Ramos General Hospital	P. Hilario Street, Ligtasan, Tarlac City
Jecsons Medical Center	McArthur Highway, Barangay San Nicolas, Tarlac City
Tarlac Medical Center	8th St. TDMC Hospital Drive, Fairlane Subdivision, San Vicente Tarlac City
Allied Care Experts Medical Center-Baypointe, Inc.	Block 8 Lot 1A & 1B Dewey Avenue, Central Business District Area, Subic Bay Freefort Zone, Zambales
Angeles University Foundation Medical Center, Inc.	Mc-Arthur Highway, Angeles City
Our Lady of Mt. Carmel Medical Center, Inc.	Km. 78 Mc-Arthur Hi-way, Brgy. Saguin, City of San Fernando, Pampanga
Premiere Medical Center	Maharlika Hi-way, Daan Sarile, Cabanatuan City
Central Luzon Doctors’ Hospital, Inc.	Hospital Drive, San Vicente, Tarlac City
Dr. Gloria D. Lacson General Hospital	# 180 National Highway Castellano, San Leonardo
Heart of Jesus Hospital	Brgy. R. Rueda, San Jose City, Nueva Ecija
Ulticare Medical Center, Inc.	#02 National Highway, Brgy. Barretto, Olongapo City, Zambales

== Region 4-A Calabarzon Center for Health Development ==
=== Government hospitals ===
Name of Hospital	Location	Class
Southern Tagalog Regional Hospital	Reyville Subdivision, Brgy. Habay II, Bacoor, Cavite	DOH Retained
Kawit Kalayaan Hospital	San Sebastian, Kawit, Cavite	LGU
Cavite Naval Hospital	Naval Pascual Ledesma, Fort San Felipe, Cavite City, Cavite	AFP
Ospital ng Imus	Brgy. Malagasang I-G, Imus City, Cavite	LGU
Laguna Provincial Hospital - Bay District Hospital	Brgy. Maitim, Bay, Laguna	LGU
Laguna Provincial Hospital - San Pablo City District Hospital	Gen. Luna St.Brgy. 4A, San Pablo City, Laguna	LGU
San Pedro Jose L. Amante Emergency Hospital	#7 Sto Niño St. Sto Niño, San Pedro, Laguna	LGU
University Health Service	Narra Rod, Forestry Campus, U.P. Los Banos, Laguna	University
Dr. Jose P. Rizal Memorial District Hospital	Bucal, Calamba City, Laguna	LGU
Ospital ng Cabuyao	City of Cabuyao, Laguna	LGU
Cabuyao City Hospital	Brgy. Banaybanay, Cabuyao City, Laguna	LGU
Santa Rosa Community Hospital	Cattleya St. LM Subd. Brgy. Market Area, Sta Rosa City, Laguna	LGU
San Pablo City General Hospital	Banagale Subdivision, san Jose, San Pablo City, Laguna	LGU
Bagong Cainta Municipal Hospital	Municipal Compound, Brgy. Sto Domingo, Cainta, Rizal	LGU
Casimiro A. Ynares Sr. Memorial Hospital	Burgos, Montalban, Rizal	LGU
Rizal Provincial Hosp.System- Angono Annex	Ibanez St, San Isidro, Angono, Rizal	LGU
Rizal Provincial Hospital System - Binangonan Annex	Manila East Road, Darangan, Morong, Rizal	LGU
Rizal Provincial Hospital System-Morong Main	T. Claudio St. Brgy. San Juan, Morong, Rizal	LGU
Antipolo City Hospital System - Cabading	Sitio Cabading, Inarawan, Antipolo City, Rizal	LGU
Antipolo City Hospital System Iv - Mambugan	Sumulong Highway, Brgy. Mambugan, Antipolo City, Rizal	LGU
Rizal Provincial Hospital System-Antipolo Annex	NHA. Avenue, Purok Imelda, Brgy Dela Paz, Antipolo City, Rizal	LGU
Rizal Provincial Hospital System-Antipolo Annex Ii	Provincial Road, Barangay Dalig, Antipolo City, Rizal	LGU
Apacible Memorial Dist. Hospital	Villa Marquita Subdivision, Lumbangan, Sitio Sagbat, Nasugbu, Batangas	LGU
Batangas Provincial Hospital	Brgy. Palanas, Lemery, Batangas	LGU
Bauan General Hospital	S. Ylagan St., Aplaya, Bauan, Batangas	LGU
Don Manuel Lopez Mem. Dist. Hospital	Gumamela, Balayan, Batangas	LGU
Lobo Municipal Hospital	Fabrica, Lobo, Batangas	LGU
Mahal Na Virgen Maria Sto.Rosario District Hospital	Namunga, Rosario, Batangas	LGU
Martin Marasigan District Hospital	Malvar cor Mabini St. Cuenca, Batangas	LGU
San Jose District Hospital	Banay-Banay 1, San Jose, Batangas	LGU
San Juan District Hospital	Talahiban 2nd, San Juan, Batangas	LGU
Fernando Air Base Hospital	Fernando Blvd., Fernando Air Base, Lipa City, Batangas	PAF
Lipa City District Hospital	Granja, Lipa City, Batangas	LGU
Ospital ng Lipa	Tangco Drive, Marawoy, Lipa City, Batangas	LGU
Laurel Memorial District Hospital	Santor, Tanauan City, Batangas	LGU
Quezon Provincial Hospital Network - Alabat	National Road Cor Quezon St. Alabat, Quezon	LGU
Quezon Provincial Hospital Network - Bondoc Peninsula (Catanauan)	Brgy. 08, Catanauan, Quezon	LGU
Quezon Provincial Hospital Network - Claro M. Recto (Infanta)	Brgy. Gumian, Infanta, Quezon	LGU
Quezon Provincial Hospital Network - Doña Marta (Atimonan)	G. Orda St. Zone II, Atimonan, Quezon	LGU
Quezon Provincial Hospital Network - Guinayangan	Brgy Calimpac, Guinayangan, Quezon	LGU
Quezon Provincial Hospital Network - Gumaca	Maharlika Highway, Brgy. Rosario, Gumaca, Quezon	LGU
Quezon Provincial Hospital Network - Magsaysay (Lopez)	Maharlika Highway, Brgy. Magsaysay, Lopez, Quezon	LGU
Maria L. Eleazar General Hospital	Munting Parang, Tagkwayan, Quezon	DOH-retained
Quezon Provincial Hospital Network - Mauban	Polo, Mauban, Quezon	LGU
Quezon Provincial Hospital Network - San Francisco	Munting Parang, Tagkawayan, Quezon	LGU
Quezon Provincial Hospital Network - San Narciso	Brgy. Bayanihan, San Narciso	LGU
Quezon Provincial Hospital Network - Unisan	Brgy. Ibabang Kalilayan, Unisan, Quezon	LGU
Pagamutan ng Dasmariñas	Brgy. Burol II, City of Dasmariñas City	LGU
Laguna Medical Center	J. de leon St., Sta. Cruz, Laguna	LGU
Quezon Provincial Hospital Network - Quezon Medical Center	Quezon Avenue, Lucena City, Quezon	LGU
General Emilio Aguinaldo Memorial Hospital	Luciano, Trece Martires City, Cavite	LGU
Batangas Medical Center	Kumintang Ibaba, Batangas City	DOH Retained

=== Private hospitals ===
Name of Hospital	Location
Metro San Jose Medical Center	National Highway, Banaybanay 2nd, San Jose, Batangas
Lemery Doctors Medical Center	R. Diokno St., Lemery, Batangas
Metro Lemery Medical Center	Palanas, Lemery, Batangas
Our Lady Of Caysasay Medical Center, Inc.	V. Illustre Ave., Lemery, Batangas
Taal Polymedic Hospital And Medical Center	Diversion Road, Carsuche, Taal, Batangas
Metro Balayan Medical Center	National Hi-way, Brgy. Caloocan, Balayan, Batangas
Medical Center Western Batangas	Brgy,.Lanatan, Balayan, Batangas
Bauan Doctors General Hospital	F. Mangobos St., cor. Taño Road, Poblacion I, Bauan, Batangas
San Antonio Life Care Corporation	Brgy. San Antonio, San Pascual, Batangas
St. Frances Cabrini Medical Center, Incorporated	Maharlika Highway, Poblacion 2, Sto. Tomas, Batangas
Golden Gate Batangas Hospital, Inc.	17 P. Prieto St., Brgy. 4, Poblacion, Batangas City
Batangas Healthcare Specialists Medical Center	Diversion Road, Barangay Alangilan, Batangas City, Batangas
United Doctors Of St. Camillus De Lellis Hospital	Diversion Road, Barangay Bolbok, Batangas City, Batangas
Batangas Health Care Hospital, Jesus Of Nazareth	Brgy. Gulod, Itaas, Batangas City, Batangas
San Antonio Medical Center Of Lipa, Inc.	#2 C.M. Recto Avenue, Lipa City, Batangas
N.L. Villa Memorial Medical Center	F. Manalo St., Lipa City, Batangas
Lipa Medix Medical Center	Ayala Highway, Balintawak, Lipa City, Batangas
Metro Lipa Medical Center	J.P. Laurel Highway, Brgy. Marawoy, Lipa City, Batangas
C.P. Reyes Hospital	A. Mabini Avenue, Tanauan City, Batangas
Daniel O. Mercado Medical Center	No. 1 Pres. Laurel Highway, Tanauan City, Batangas
Gentri Medical Center And Hospital, Inc.	Santosan Street, Brgy. Manggahan, General Trias, Cavite
Divine Grace Medical Center	Bypass Road, Tejero, General Trias, Cavite
City Of General Trias Doctors Medical Center Inc.	Governor’s Drive, Manggahan, General Trias,, Cavite
Tanza Specialists Medical Center, Inc.	Daang Amaya III, Tanza, Cavite
Silang Specialists Medical Center, Inc.	Aguinaldo Hi-way, San Vicente II, Silang, Cavite
Binakayan Hospital And Medical Center, Inc.	175 Covelandia Road, Brgy. Balsahan Bisita, Binakayan, Kawit, Cavite
San Pedro Calungsod Medical Center, Inc.	3141-C Kalayaan Ave., Brgy. Magdalo, Kawit, Cavite
Carmona Hospital And Medical Center Inc.	Governor's Drive, Purificacion St., Brgy. Mabuhay, Carmona, Cavite
Cavite East Asia Medical Center, Inc.	Molino Road, Brgy. Molino III, Bacoor, Cavite
Metro South Medical Center	National Road, Molino IV, Bacoor, Cavite
St. Dominic Medical Center Inc.	Aguinaldo Highway, Talaba, Bacoor City, Cavite
South City Hospital And Medical Center, Inc.	115 Daang Hari Road, Molino IV, Bacoor, Cavite
Cavite Medical Center	Manila-Cavite Road, Dalahican, Cavite City
Dasmariñas City Medical Center, Inc.	Salawag Crossing, Barangay Salawag, City of Dasmariñas, Cavite
St. Paul Hospital Cavite, Inc.	Burol II, Bagong Bayan, Dasmariñas, Cavite
Emilio Aguinaldo College Medical Center Cavite	Brgy. Salitran 2, Dasmariñas City, Cavite
Our Lady Of The Pillar Medical Center	Tamsui Avenue, Bayan Luma, Imus, Cavite
Medical Center Imus	Diversion Road, Palico IV, Imus, Cavite
City Of Imus Doctors Hospital, Inc.	Aguinaldo Highway, Anabu I, Imus City
South Imus Specialist Hospital, Inc.	D.C. Ilano Blvd., Anabu 2C, City of Imus, Cavite
Tagaytay Medical Center, Inc.	E. Aguinaldo Highway, Silang Crossing East, Rotonda, Tagaytay City
Global Care Medical Center Of Bay, Inc.	National highway, Brgy. Maitim. Bay, Laguna
Healthserv Los Banos Medical Center	#8817 National Highway, Batong Malake, Los Baños, Laguna
Los Banos Doctors Hospital And Medical Center Incorporated	Brgy. Batong Malake, Los Baños, Laguna
Westlake Medical Center	National Highway, Brgy. Nueva, San Pedro, Laguna
Laguna Holy Family Hospital, Inc.	#1824 J. De Leon St., Sta. Cruz, Laguna
Laguna Doctors Hospital, Inc.	P. Guevarra St., Sitio Mapagmahal, Brgy. Pagsawitan, Sta. Cruz, Laguna
Siniloan Pioneer General Hospital, Inc.	L. De Leon St., Brgy. M. Acevida, Siniloan, Laguna
Unihealth-Southwoods Hospital And Medical Center	Blk 11 Lot 3 Southwoods Ecocentrum, Business Park, Brgy. San Francisco, Biñan City, Laguna
Binan Doctors' Hospital, Incorporated	Platero, Biñan City, Laguna
Calamba Medical Center, Inc.	#13 National Highway (Crossing), Brgy. Real, Calamba City, Laguna
Global Care Medical Center Of Canlubang, Inc.	J. Yulo Avenue, Barangay Canlubang, Calamba City, Laguna
Calamba Doctors' Hospital	Km. 49, National Highway, Parian, Calamba City, Laguna
Global Medical Center Of Laguna, Inc.	National Highway, Brgy. Barlic, Cabuyao City
Calamba City Hospital	Kapayapaan Ave, Brgy. Canlubang, Calamba City
First Cabuyao Hospital And Medical Center, Inc.	12 National Road, Barrio Sala, City of Cabuyao, Laguna
Community General Hospital Of San Pablo City, Inc.	C. Colago Avenue, San Pablo City, Laguna
San Pablo Colleges Medical Center	Maharlika Highway, Brgy. San Rafael, San Pablo City, Laguna
San Pablo Doctors Hospital	#55 A. Mabini St., San Pablo City, Laguna
St. James Hospital, Inc.	Mariquita Pueblo, Dita, Sta. Rosa City, Laguna
Unihealth-Sta. Rosa Hospital And Medical Center, Inc.	RSBS Blvd., San Lorenzo South Balibago, Sta. Rosa City, Laguna
Qualimed Health Network Sta Rosa	Nuvali North, Barangay Sto. Domingo, Sta. Rosa City, Laguna
The Medical City South Luzon	Greenfield City, Brgy. Don Jose, Sta. Rosa City, Laguna
New Sinai Mdi Hospital	National Highway, Tagapo, Santa Rosa, Laguna
Rakkk Prophet Medical Center, Inc.	Km 194 Maharlika Highway, Brgy. Rosario, Gumaca, Quezon
United Candelaria Doctors, Inc.	Mangilag Sur, Candelaria, Quezon
Peter Paul Medical Center Of Candelaria, Inc.	Regidor St., Poblacion, Candelaria, Quezon
Mount Carmel Diocesan General Hospital	Allarey Extension, Brgy I, Lucena City, Quezon
Lucena Mmg General Hospital	Red-V, Maharlika Hi-way, Ibabang Dupay, Lucena City, Quezon
St. Anne General Hospital, Inc.	P. Gomez Ext., Red-V, Ibabang Dupay, Lucena City
Lucena United Doctors Hospital And Medical Center	Barangay Isabang, Lucena City, Quezon
Tayabas Community Hospital, Inc.	National Road, Brgy. Wakas, City of Tayabas, Quezon
Binangonan Lakeview Hospital, Inc.	Km. 31, Manila East Road, Barangay Tagpos, Binangonan, Rizal
Ortigas Hospital And Healthcare Center, Inc.	Km. 21 Ortigas Ave. Extension, corner Brookside Hills Subd., Brgy. San Isidro, Cainta, Rizal
San Mateo Medical Center,	General Luna Ave., Brgy. Ampid 2, San Mateo, Rizal
Manila East Medical Center	Manila East Road, Brgy. Dolores, Taytay, Rizal
Assumption Specialty Hospital And Medical Center, Inc.	Sumulong Highway, Dela paz, Antipolo City, Rizal
Metro Antipolo Hospital & Medical Center, Inc.	1348 Marcos Highway, Brgy. Mayamot, Antipolo City, Rizal
Dionisio M. Cornel Medical Center, Inc.	#8001 Marcos Highway, Mayamot, Antipolo City
Clinica Antipolo Hospital And Wellness Center, Inc,	Lot 4, Ninoy Aquino Ave., Brgy. Dela Paz, Antipolo City
Fatima University Medical Center Antipolo Corp.	Km 23 Highway, Sumulong, Sta. Cruz, Antipolo City, Rizal
Saint Patrick'S Hospital Medical Center	Lopez Jaena St., Batangas City, Batangas
Mary Mediatrix Medical Center, Inc.	J.P. Laurel Highway, Mataas na Lupa, Lipa City, Batangas
De La Salle University Medical Center	Gov. Dominador I. Mangubat Avenue, Zone 4, City of Dasmariñas, Cavite
Uph-Dr. Jose G. Tamayo Medical Center	Brgy. Sto. Niño, Biñan, Laguna

== Region 4-B Mimaropa Center for Health Development ==
=== Government hospitals ===
Name of Hospital	Location	Class
Oriental Mindoro Provincial Hospital	Sta. Isabel, Calapan City, Oriental Mindoro	LGU
Oriental Mindoro Southern District Hospital	Western Nautical Highway, Brgy. Odiong, Roxas	LGU
Oriental Mindoro Central District Hospital	Strong Nautical Highway, Papandayan, Pinamalayan	LGU
Occidental Mindoro Provincial Hospital	Brgy. Tayamaan, Mamburao, Occidental Mindoro	LGU
San Jose District Hospital	National Highway, San Isidro, San Jose, Occidental Mindoro	LGU
San Sebastian District Hospital	Sitio Macambang, Buenavista, Sablayan, Occidental Mindoro	LGU
Marinduque Provincial Hospital (Dr. Damian Reyes Provincial Hospital)	Santol, Boac, Marinduque	LGU
Romblon Provincial Hospital	Liwanag, Odiongan, Romblon	LGU
Romblon District Hospital	Capaclan Bridge, Gov Fetalvero Ave, Romblon	LGU
Aborlan Medicare Hospital	Ramon Magsaysay, Aborlan, Palawan	LGU
Southern Palawan Provincial Hospital	Tubtub, Brooke's Point, Palawan	LGU
Culion Sanitarium and General Hospital	Brgy. Tiza, Culion, Palawan	DOH Retained
Narra Municipal Hospital	Brgy. Antipuluan, Narra	LGU
Northern Palawan Provincial Hospital	Poblacion, Taytay, Palawan	LGU
Camp Ricarte Station Hospital	Wescom Road, San Miguel, Puerto Princesa City, Palawan	AFP
Ospital ng Palawan	#220 Malvar St., Brgy. San Manuel, Puerto Princesa City, Palawan	DOH Retained

=== Private hospitals ===
Name of Hospital	Location
Maria Estrella General Hospital, Inc.	Brgy. Tawiran, Calapan City, Oriental Mindoro
Medical Mission Group Hospital Multipurpose Cooperative Of Oriental Mindoro	J.P. Rizal St., Tawiran, Calapan City, Oriental Mindoro
Adventist Hospital-Palawan, Inc.	San Pedro, Puerto Princesa City, Palawan
Palawan Medical Mission Group Multipurpose Cooperative	Corner Burgos/Mabini St., Puerto Princesa City, Palawan

== Region 5 Bicol Center for Health Development ==
=== Government hospitals ===
Name of Hospital	Location	Class
Rapu-Rapu District Hospital	San Bautista St., Poblacion, Rapu-Rapu, Albay	LGU
Josefina Belmonte Duran Memorial District Hospital	Purok 2, Tuburan, Ligao City, Albay	LGU
Legazpi City Hospital	Zone 9, Bitano, Legazpi City, Albay	LGU
Dr. Lorenzo T. Ziga Memorial District Hospital	Karangahan Boulevard, Tabaco City, Albay	LGU
Labo District Hospital	Talobatib, Labo, Camarines Norte	LGU
Libmanan District Hospital	Bagumbayan, Libmanan, Camarines Sur	LGU
Naga City Hospital	Peñafrancia Avenue, Naga City, Camarines Sur	LGU
Juan M. Alberto Memorial District Hospital	Belmonte, San Andres, Catanduanes	LGU
Pandan District Hospital	Vera Street, Napo, Pandan, Catanduanes	LGU
Viga District Hospital	San Vicente, Viga, Catanduanes	LGU
Cataingan District Hospital	Poblacion, Cataingan, Masbate	LGU
Masbate Provincial Hospital	PHO Road, Brgy. J.T. Fernandez, Masbate City	LGU
Donsol District Hospital	Tres Marias Drive, Donsol, Sorsogon	LGU
Irosin District Hospital	Maharlika Highway, San Pedro, Irosin, Sorsogon	LGU
Gubat District Hospital	Bonifacio St., Manook, Gubat, Sorsogon	LGU
Castilla District Hospital	Sunflower St., Cumadcad, Castilla, Sorsogon	LGU
Camarines Norte Provincial Hospital	Bagasbas Road, Daet, Camarines Norte	LGU
Bicol Region General Hospital and Geriatric Medical Center	San Pedro, Cabusao, Camarines Sur	DOH Retained
Eastern Bicol Medical Center	San Isidro Village, Virac, Catanduanes	LGU
Sorsogon Provincial Hospitals	Macabog, Sorsogon City	LGU
Bicol Regional Hospital and Medical Center	Daraga, Albay	DOH Retained
Bicol Medical Center	Concepcion Pequeña, Naga City	DOH Retained

=== Private hospitals ===
Name of Hospital	Location
Daraga Doctors’ Hospital, Inc.	Rizal St. Ext., Bañag, Daraga, Albay
Albay Doctors’ Hospital, Inc.	Peñaranda Street, Legazpi City, Albay
University Of Santo Tomas (UST) - Legazpi, Inc.	Captain F. Aquende Drive, Legazpi City
Estevez Memorial Hospital, Inc.	Don Juan S. Estevez St., Guevarra Subd., Ilawod East, Legaspi City, Albay
Tanchuling General Hospital, Inc.	Imperial Court Subdivision, Rizal St., Legaspi City, Albay
Our Lady Of Lourdes Hospital	Vinzons Avenue, Barangay Lag-on, Daet, Camarines Norte
Santissima Trinidad Hospital Of Daet	Diversion Road, Camambugan, Daet, Camarines Norte
Leon D. Hernandez Memorial Hospital, Inc.	1328 Dasmariñas St., Brgy. 8, Daet, Camarines Norte
Bicol Access Health Centrum	Central Business District II, Barangay Triangulo, Naga City, Camarines Sur
Nicc Doctors’ Hospital	CBD2, Roxas Avenue, Diversion Road, Triangulo,
St. John Hospital, Inc.	Panganiban Drive, Naga City, Camarines Sur
Immaculate Heart Of Mary Hospital, Inc.	E. Rafael St., Rawis, Virac, Catanduanes
Catanduanes Doctors Hospital, Inc.	Surtida St., Barangay Valencia, Virac, Catanduanes
Sorsogon Medical Mission Group Hospital And Health Services Cooperative	Pangpang, Sorsogon City
Metro Health Specialists Hospital, Inc.	Diversion Road, Cabid-an, Sorsogon City
Gsac General Hospital	P5 Road Balogo, Sorsogon City, Sorsogon
Universidad De Sta. Isabel De Naga, Inc.	Roxas Avenue, Triangulo, Naga City, Camarines Sur
Sta. Maria Josefa Hospital	Francia, Iriga City, Camarines Sur
Our Lady Mediatrix Hospital	San Jose, Iriga City, Camarines Sur
Villanueva-Tanchuling Hospital	Francia, Iriga City, Camarines Sur
Lourdes Hospital	San Roque, Iriga City, Camarines Sur

== Region 6 Western Visayas Center for Health Development ==
=== Government hospitals ===
Name of Hospital	Location	Class
Culasi District Hospital	Culasi	LGU
Ramon Maza Sr. Memorial District Hospital	Sibalom	LGU
Bailan District Hospital	Pontevedra	LGU
Mambusao District Hospital	Mambusao	LGU
Dr. Catalino Gallego Nava Provincial Hospital	Jordan	LGU
Aleosan District Hospital	Alimodian	LGU
Don Jose S. Monfort Medical Center Extension Hospital	Barotac Nuevo	LGU
Governor Niel D. Tupas Sr. District Hospital	Barotac Viejo	LGU
Dr. Ricardo S. Provido, Sr. Memorial District Hospital	Calinog	LGU
Dr. Ricardo Y. Ladrido Memorial Hospital	Lambunao	LGU
Federico Roman Tirador Sr. Memorial District Hospital	Janiuay	LGU
Iloilo City Hospital	Molo, Iloilo City	LGU
Iloilo Provincial Hospital	Pototan	LGU
Jesus M. Colmenares District Hospital	Balasan	LGU
Ramon D. Duremdes District Hospital	Dumangas	LGU
Ramon Tabiana Memorial District Hospital	Cabatuan	LGU
Rep. Pedro G. Trono Memorial Hospital	Guimbal	LGU
Sara District Hospital	Sara	LGU
Western Visayas Sanitarium and General Hospital	Sta. Barbara	DOH Retained
Don Valerio Palmares, Sr. Memorial District Hospital	Passi City	LGU
Valladolid District Hospital	Valladolid	LGU
Bago City Hospital	Bago City	LGU
Cadiz District Hospital	Cadiz City	LGU
Vicente Gustilo District Hospital	Escalante City	LGU
Don Salvador Benedicto Memorial District Hospital	La Carlota City	LGU
Gov. Valeriano M. Gatuslao Memorial Hospital	Himamaylan City	LGU
Lorenzo D. Zayco District Hospital	Kabankalan City	LGU
San Carlos City Hospital	San Carlos City	LGU
Alfredo E. Marañon, Sr. Memorial District Hospital	A.E. Marañon St., Poblacion 2, Sagay	LGU
Teresita L. Jalandoni Provincial Hospital	Silay City	LGU
Dr. Rafael S. Tumbokon Memorial Hospital	Mabini Street, Poblacion, Kalibo, Aklan	LGU
Angel Salazar Memorial General Hospital	T.A. Fornier Street, Brgy. Atabay, San Jose Antique	LGU
Roxas Memorial Provincial Hospital	Arnaldo Blvd.. Inzo Arnaldo Village, Roxas City Capiz	LGU
West Visayas State University Medical Center	E. Lopez St., Montinola, Jaro, Iloilo City	University
Western Visayas Medical Center	Q. Abeto Street, Mandurriao, Iloilo City	DOH Retained
Corazon Locsin Montelibano Memorial Regional Hospital	Lacson-Burgos Sts., Bacolod City, Negros Occidental	DOH Retained

=== Private hospitals ===
Name of Hospital	Location
Saint Gabriel Medical Center, Inc.	Archbishop Gabriel M. Reyes St. cor. G. Pastrana St., Kalibo, Aklan
Panay Health Care Multi- Purpose Cooperative	Osmeña Avenue, Estancia, Kalibo, Aklan
Antique Medical Center, Inc.	San Angel, San Jose, Antique
Capiz Doctor'S Hospital	Bryg. Lawaan, 1st District, Roxas City
The Health Centrum, Inc.	Teodorica Ave., Banica, Roxas City, Capiz
Capiz Emmanuel Hospital, Inc.	Roxas Avenue, Roxas City, Capiz
St. Anthony College Hospital	San Roque Extension, Roxas City, Capiz
Qualimed Health Network	Ayala Atria Park Dist., Don Donato Pison Ave., Brgy. San Rafael, Mandurriao, Iloilo
Holy Mary Women And Children'S Hospital	Felix Goriceta Ave., Balabag, 2nd District, Pavia, Iloilo
Amosup Seamen's Hospital-Iloilo	Onate Street, Onate Street, Mandurriao, Iloilo City
The Medical City - Iloilo	Locsin Street, Brgy. Tap- oc, Molo, Iloilo City, Iloilo
Metro Iloilo Hospital And Medical Center, Inc.	Metropolis Ave. Brgy. Tagbak, Jaro, IloIlo City
Medicus Medical Center Corporation	R.V. Bernardo Avenue, Brgy. San Rafael, Mandurriao, Iloilo City
South Bacolod General Hospital And Medical Center, Inc.	Araneta Highway, Pahanocoy, Bacolod City, Negros Occidental
Bacolod Queen Of Mercy Hospital	Eroreco, LN Drive, Mandalagan, Bacolod City, Negros Occidental
Hinigaran Doctors' Hospital Incorporated	Corner M.H. Del Pilar and Luna Street, Barangay 3, Hinigaran, Negros Occidental
Metro Bacolod Hospital And Medical Center	Burgos Extension, Camingawan, Brgy. Estefania, Bacolod City, Negros Occidental
Holy Mother of Mercy Hospital Hinigaran	Sen. Espiridion Guanco Northdrive Avenue, Acacia, Brgy. Gargato, Hinigaran, Negros Occidental
Holy Mother Of Mercy Hospital	Highway Mabinay, Don Emilio Village, Barangay 9, Kabankalan City, Negros Occidental
Iloilo Doctors Hospital, Incorporated	West Avenue, Taal, Molo, Iloilo City
Iloilo Mission Hospital	Mission Road, Jaro, Iloilo City, Iloilo
St. Paul’s Hospital of Iloilo, Inc.	General Luna Street, Brgy. Danao, Iloilo City
The Doctors' Hospital, Inc.	B.S. Aquino Drive, Brgy. Villamonte, Bacolod City, Negros Occidental
Dr. Pablo O. Torre Memorial Hospital	B. Aquino Drive., Brgy. 5, Bacolod City, Negros Occidental
Adventist Medical Center- Bacolod, Inc.	C.V.Ramos Avenue, Taculing, Bacolod City, Negros Occidental

== NIR - Negros Island Region Center for Health Development ==
=== Government hospitals ===
Name of Hospital	Location	Class

=== Private hospitals ===
Name of Hospital	Location

== Region 7 Central Visayas Center for Health Development ==
=== Government hospitals ===
Name of Hospital	Location	Class
Cebu Provincial Hospital (Balamban)	Baliwagan, Balamban, Cebu	LGU
Cebu Provincial Hospital (Bogo)	Taytayan Hills, Bogo, Cebu	LGU
Camp Lapu Lapu Station Hospital, Centcom, Afp	Camp Lapulapu, Apas, Cebu City	DND
Cebu City Medical Center	N. Bacalso Ave. Cor. Panganiban St., Pahina Central, Cebu City	LGU
Saint Anthony Mother and Child Hospital	Cabreros St., Basak San Nicolas, Cebu City	DOH Retained
Cebu Provincial Hospital (Carcar City)	Baracca, Poblacion II, Carcar City, Cebu	LGU
Cebu Provincial Hospital (Danao City)	National Road, Danao City, Cebu	LGU
Eversley Childs Sanitarium and General Hospital	Northroad, Jagobiao, Mandaue City, Cebu	DOH Retained
Lapu-Lapu City Hospital	A. Tumulak St., Gun-ob, Lapu-lapu City, Cebu	LGU
Toledo City General Hospital	Magsaysay Hills, Poblacion, Toledo City, Cebu	LGU
Catigbian District Hospital	Pob. Weste, Catigbian, Bohol	LGU
Cong. Simeon G. Toribio Memorial Hospital	Poblacion Sur, Carmen, Bohol	LGU
Don Emilio del Valle Memorial Hospital	Bood, Ubay, Bohol	DOH Retained
Garcia Memorial Provincial Hospital	San Jose, Talibon, Bohol	LGU
Teodoro B. Galagar District Hospital	Severo Salas St., Pob. Jagna, Bohol	LGU
Bayawan District Hospital	Zamora Street, Ubos, Bayawan City, Negros Oriental	LGU
Gov. William (Billy) Villegas Memorial Hospital	Guihulngan City, Negros Oriental	LGU
Negros Oriental Provincial Hosp.	North Rd., National Highway, Piapi, Dumaguete City	LGU
Siquijor Provincial Hospital	Pangi, Siquijor, Siquijor	LGU
Cebu South Medical Center	San Isidro, Talisay City, Cebu	DOH Retained
Vicente Sotto Memorial Medical Center	B. rodriguez Street, Cebu city	DOH Retained
Gov. Celestino Gallares Memorial Hospital	M. Parras St., Tagbilaran City, Bohol	DOH Retained

=== Private hospitals ===
Name of Hospital	Location
Ramiro Community Hospital	0139 C. Gallares Street, Poblacion II, Tagbilaran City, Bohol
Holy Name University Medical Center, Inc.	0476 HNU Campus, J.A. Clarin St., Tagbilaran City, Bohol
Tagbilaran Community Hospital Corporation	0117 M. Parras Street, Poblacion III, Tagbilaran City, Bohol
Allied Care Experts (ACE) Medical Center Bohol, Inc.	0368 Carlos P. Garcia East Avenue, Tagbilaran City, Bohol
Mendero Medical Center, Inc.	Pitogo, Consolacion, Cebu
St. Vincent General Hospital Cebu, Inc.	210-D R. Landon St., Barangay Sambag I, Cebu City, Cebu
Cebu North General Hospital, Inc.	Kauswagan Road, Talamban, Cebu City
Adventist Hospital-Cebu, Inc.	400 Tres de Abril St., San Nicolas, Cebu city
Allied Care Experts (Ace) Medical Center Cebu, Inc.	982 N. Bacalso Ave., Basak Pardo, Cebu City, Cebu
Allegiant Regional Care Hospital, Inc.	Sitio Malinao, Brgy. Agus, Lapu-Lapu City
Mactan Doctors Hospital, Inc.	MDHI Bldg., Maximo V. Patalinghug Ave., Basak, Lapu-lapu City, Cebu
Amosup Seamen'S Hospital Cebu	Camino Vicinal St., Umapad, Mandaue City
Cebu South General Hospital	Brgy. Tuyan, City of Naga, Cebu
Holy Child Hospital	Legaspi St., Dumaguete City, Negros Oriental
Allied Care Experts (Ace) Dumaguete Doctors, Inc.	F. Cimafranca St., Daro, Dumaguete City, Negros Oriental
Negros Polymedic Hospital	North National Highway, Tubtubon, Sibulan, Negros Oriental
Cebu Doctors' University Hospital	Cebu Doctors’ University Bldg., Osmeña Blvd., Brgy. Capitol Site, Cebu City
Visayas Med-Cebu (Formerly Visayas Community Medical Center, Inc)	85 Osmeña Boulevard, Cebu City
Cebu (Velez) General Hospital, Inc.	41 F. Ramos St., Brgy. Cogon Central, Cebu City
Chong Hua Hospital	Don Mariano Cui St., Cebu City
Southwestern University Medical Center	SWU Villa Aznar, Urgello Street, Sambag, Cebu City
Perpetual Succour Hospital Of Cebu, Inc.	Gorordo Avenue, Cebu City, Cebu
University Of Cebu Medical Center, Inc.	Ouano Avenue, City South Special Economic Administrative Zone, Mandaue City, Cebu
Chong Hua Hospital Mandaue	Mantawi International Drive, Subangdaku, Mandaue City, Cebu
Silliman University Medical Center	V. Aldecoa Sr. Road, Daro, Dumaguete City, Negros Oriental
Allied Care Experts (ACE) Medical Center - Bayawan, Inc.	Integrated Business Center, brgy. Villareal, Bayawan City, Negros Oriental

== Region 8 Eastern Visayas Center for Health Development ==
=== Government hospitals ===
Name of Hospital	Location	Class
Hinunangan Community Hospital	Bangcas A, Hinunangan, Southern Leyte	LGU
Abuyog District Hospital	Maharlika Highway, Bunga, Abuyog, Leyte	LGU
Burauen District Hospital	Camansi Dist. I, Burauen, Leyte	LGU
Carigara District Hospital	Baruguhay Norte, Carigara, Leyte	LGU
Dr. Manuel B. Veloso Memorial Hospital	Mabini St., Mazanalo, Palompon, Leyte	LGU
Hilongos District Hospital	CV Alcuino St., Central, Hilongos, Leyte	LGU
Leyte Provincial Hospital	Candahug, Palo, Leyte	LGU
Governor Benjamin T. Romualdez General Hospital and Schistosomiasis Center	San Salvador St, Brgy. Salvacion, Palo, Leyte	DOH Retained
Western Leyte Provincial Hospital	Corner G.H. del Pillar &	LGU
Tacloban City Hospital	Brgy. 80, Marasbaras, Tacloban City	LGU
Ormoc District Hospital	Brgy, Cogon, Ormoc City, Leyte	LGU
Anahawan District Hospital	Brgy. Poblacion, Anahawan, Southern Leyte	LGU
Sogod District Hospital	Osmena St., Zone 1, Sogod, Southern Leyte	LGU
Basey District Hospital	San Miguel, Loyo, Basey, Samar	LGU
Calbayog District Hospital	Burgos St., East Awang, Calbayog, Samar	LGU
Camp Lukban Station Hospital	Camp Gen. Vicente Lukban, 8ID DA, Maulong, Catbalogan City, Samar	AFP
Samar Provincial Hospital	Capitol Groud, Brgy. 7, Catbalogan City	LGU
Felipe Abrigo Memorial Hospital	Brgy. Cantahay, Guiuan, Eastern Samar	LGU
Borongan Doctors Hospital	Real St., Songco, Borongan, Eastern Samar	LGU
Allen District Hospital	Hospital Drive, Kinabranan Zone II, Allen, Northern Samar	LGU
Northern Samar Provincial Hospital	Balite St., Brgy. Acacia, Catarman, Northern Samar	LGU
Biliran Provincial Hospital	Castin St., Brgy. P.I. Garcia, Naval, Biliran	LGU
Salvacion Oppus Yniguez Memorial Provincial Hospital	Dongon, Maasin City, Southern Leyte	LGU
Eastern Samar Provincial Hospital	Real St., Songco, Borongan, Eastern Samar	LGU
Eastern Visayas Medical Center	Barangay 93, Bagacay, Tacloban City, Leyte	DOH Retained
Samar Island Medical Center	Calbayog City, Samar	DOH Retained

=== Private hospitals ===
Name of Hospital	Location
Zenon T. Lagumbay Memorial Hospital	Labrador, Hinunangan, Southern Leyte
Doña Remedios Trinidad- Romualdez Medical	Calanipawan Road, Brgy. 96, 1st District, Tacloban City, Leyte
Mother Of Mercy Hospital- Tacloban Inc.	Benigno Ave., Brgy. 50-B Youngfield, Tacloban City, Leyte
Allied Care Experts (Ace) Medical Center-Tacloban Inc.	Lot 1 Tabuan National Highway, Brgy. 78, Marasbaras, Tacloban City, Leyte
Ospa-Farmers’ Medical Center	Brgy. Can-adieng, Ormoc City, Leyte
Ormoc Doctors Hospital, Inc.	C. Aviles cor. San Pablo St., District 15, Ormoc City,
Divine Word Hospital	Brgy. 44-A Avenida Veteranos, Tacloban City

== Region 9 Zamboanga Peninsula Center for Health Development ==
=== Government hospitals ===
Name of Hospital	Location	Class
Dr. George Tocao Hofer Medical Center	Tenan, Ipil, Zamboanga Sibugay	LGU
Sindangan District Hospital	Poblacion, Sindangan, Zamboanga del Norte	LGU
Dr. Jose Rizal Memorial Hospital	National Highway, Lawaan, Dapitan City, Zamboanga del Norte	DOH Retained
Corazon C. Aquino Hospital	Dr. Santiago Calo Rd (formerly Circumferential Rd), Biasong, Dipolog City, Zamboanga del Norte	LGU
Margosatubig Regional Hospital	Poblacion, Margosatubig, Zamboanga del Sur	DOH Retained
Labuan General Hospital	Labuan, Zamboanga City	DOH Retained
Mindanao Central Sanitarium	Pasobolong, Zamboanga City	DOH Retained
Basilan General Hospital	Binuangan, Isabela City, Basilan	DOH Retained
Sulu Sanitarium and General Hospital	Jolo, Sulu	DOH Retained
Zamboanga del Norte Medical Center	Barangay Sicayab, Dipolog City, Zamboanga del Norte	LGU
Zamboanga del Sur Medical Center	Barangay Dao, Pagadian City, Zamboanga del Sur	LGU
Zamboanga City Medical Center	Dr. Evangelista St., Sta. Catalina, Zamboanga City	DOH Retained
Alicia District Hospital	Poblacion, Alicia, Zamboanga Sibugay	LGU
Malangas Emergency Infirmary	Barangay Candiis, Malangas, Zamboanga Sibugay	LGU
Olutanga Municipal Hospital	Barangay Bateria, Olutanga, Zamboanga Sibugay	LGU
Wilfredo C. Palma Memorial Hospital	Poblacion, Diplahan, Zamboanga Sibugay	LGU

=== Private hospitals ===
Name of Hospital	Location
Pagadian City Medical Center	Cabrera St., San Francisco District, Pagadian City
Zamboanga Doctors’ Hospital, Inc.	Veterans Avenue, Zamboanga City, Zamboanga del Sur
Zamboanga del Norte Service Cooperative Hospital	Dipolog-Polanco-Oroquieta Road, Lower Turno, Dipolog City, Zamboanga del Norte
West Metro Medical Center	Veterans Ave., Extension, Zamboanga City
Brent Hospital And Colleges, Inc.	RT Lim Boulevard, Sto. Niño, Zamboanga City
Ciudad Medical Zamboanga	Mayor Vitaliano D. Agan Avenue, Zamboanga City
Zamboanga Peninsula Medical Center, Inc	Maria Clara Lobregat Highway, Putik, Zamboanga City
Hospital de Zamboanga, Inc.	Pilar St., Barangay Zone II, Zamboanga City
Ospital ng Kabataan ng Dipolog, Inc.	Padre Ramon St., Estaka, Dipolog City, Zamboanga del Norte
Allied Care Experts (ACE) Medical Center-Dipolog, Inc.	National Highway, Olingan, Dipolog City, Zamboanga del Norte
M. Simon Hospital	Barangay Poblacion, Ipil, Zamboanga Sibugay
Ipil Doctors Hospital	Barangay Sanito, Ipil, Zamboanga Sibugay
Pathfinder Estate Hospital	Barangay Lumbayao, Kabasalan, Zamboanga Sibugay
Romeo B. Sibud County Hospital	Barangay Poblacion, Titay, Zamboanga Sibugay
FCC Infirmary	Barangay Poblacion, Ipil, Zamboanga Sibugay
RT Lim Family Hospital	Purok Violeta, Barangay Katipunan, Roseller T. Lim, Zamboanga Sibugay
Dr. Henry de Villa Memorial Hospital	Barangay Poblacion, Ipil, Zamboanga Sibugay
Universidad de Zamboanga Medical Center, Inc.	247 San Jose Road, Zamboanga City

== Region 10 Northern Mindanao Center for Health Development ==
=== Government hospitals ===
Name of Hospital	Location	Class
Misamis Oriental Provincial Hospital - Balingasag	Rizal - Delmar St., Barangay 3, Balingasag, Misamis Oriental	LGU
Misamis Oriental Provincial Hospital - Talisayan	Brgy. Mintabon, Talisayan, Misamis Oriental	LGU
Misamis Oriental Provincial Hospital - Initao	Codilla St., Poblacion, Initao, Misamis Oriental	LGU
Misamis Oriental Provincial Hospital - Manticao	Poblacion, Manticao, Misamis Oriental	LGU
Misamis Oriental Provincial Hospital - Gingoog	Doña Graciana St., Gingoog City, Misamis Oriental	LGU
Camp Evangelista Station Hospital, 4Id, Pa	Camp Evangelista, Patag, Cagayan de Oro City, Misamis Oriental	AFP
J.R. Borja General Hospital	J.V. Seriña St., Carmen, Cagayan de Oro City	LGU
Calamba District Hospital	Purok 4 Bunawan, Calamba, Misamis Occidental	LGU
Doña Maria D. Tan Memorial Hospital	Fertig St., Mantic, Tangub City, Misamis Occidental	LGU
Bukidnon Provincial Hospital - Kibawe	CM Recto St., Kibawe, Bukidnon	LGU
Bukidnon Provincial Hospital - Manolo Fortich	San Miguel, Manolo Fortich, Bukidnon	LGU
Kolambugan Provincial Hospital	Austin Heights, Kolambugan, Lanao del Norte	LGU
Kapatagan Provincial Hospital	Maranding Annex, Kapatagan, Lanao del Norte	LGU
Lanao Del Norte Provincial Hospital	Lower Sagadan, Baroy, Lanao del Norte	LGU
Camiguin General Hospital	Lakas, Mambajao, Camiguin	LGU
Mayor Hilarion A. Ramiro Sr. Medical Center	Maningcol, Ozamiz City	DOH Retained
Misamis Occidental Provincial Hospital	Independence St., Lower Langcangan, Oroquieta City, Misamis Occidental	LGU
Bukidnon Provincial Hospital-Maramag	Maramag, Bukidnon	LGU
Bukidnon Provincial Medical Center-Malaybalay City	Casisang, Malaybalay City, Bukidnon	LGU
Gregorio T. Lluch Memorial Hospital	Iligan City, Lanao del Norte	LGU
Northern Mindanao Medical Center	Capitol Compound, Cagayan de Oro City	DOH Retained
Amai Pakpak Medical Center	Barangay Datu Saber, 9700 Marawi City, Lanao del Sur	DOH Retained

=== Private hospitals ===
Name of Hospital	Location
Don Carlos Doctors Hospital	E. Aguinaldo St., Poblacion, Don Carlos, Bukidnon
St. Joseph Southern Bukidnon Hospital, Inc.	Sayre Highway, Purok 8, North Poblacion, Maramag, Bukidnon
Phillips Memorial Hospital	Camp Phillips, Manolo Fortich, Bukidnon
Malaybalay Polymedic General Hospital, Inc.	Fortich St., Brgy. 9, Malaybalay City, Bukidnon
Valencia Polymedic General Hospital, Inc.	Sayre Highway, Poblacion, Valencia City, Bukidnon
Adventist Medical Center- Valencia City, Inc.	A. Aguilar St., Valencia City, Bukidnon
La Viña General Hospital, Inc.	L. Alkuino St., Poblacion, Valencia City, Bukidnon
Dr. Uy Hospital, Inc.	Roxas Avenue, Iligan City
Iligan Medical Center Hospital	San Miguel Village, Pala-o, Iligan City
Mercy Community Hospital, Inc.	Sister of Mercy Road, Camague, Iligan City
Adventist Medical Center- Iligan City, Inc.	Andres Bonifacio Avenue, San Miguel, Iligan City
E And R Hospital And Pharmacy	Benito Labao Street, Extension, Iligan City
Medina General Hospital	Governor Angel N. Medina Sr. Avenue, New Annex, Ozamiz City
Misamis University Medical Center	Bagakay, Ozamiz City
Tagoloan Polymedic General Hospital, Inc.	Brgy. Sta. Cruz, Tagoloan, Misamis Oriental
Madonna and Child Hospital	J.V. Seriña St., Carmen, Cagayan de Oro City
Cagayan De Oro Medical Center, Inc.	Tiano-Nacalaban Street, Cagayan de Oro City
Capitol University Medical Center	Claro M. Recto Highway, Gusa, Cagayan de Oro City
C.D.O. Polymedic Medical Plaza, Inc.	Kauswagan Highway, Cagayan de Oro City
Maria Reyna-Xavier University Hospital, Inc.	Hayes St., Cagayan de Oro City

== Region 11 Davao Center for Health Development ==
=== Government hospitals ===
Name of Hospital	Location	Class
Davao Del Norte Hospital (Kapalong Zone)	Quezon St. Maniki Kapalong, Dvo. Norte	LGU
Davao Del Norte Hospital- Carmen	Brgy. Ising, Carmen, Davao Norte	LGU
Davao Del Norte Hospital- (Island Garden City Of Samal Zone)	Datu Taganiog St., Peñaplata, IGACOS	LGU
Malita District Hospital	National Highway, Malita, Dvo Occidental	LGU
Davao De Oro Provincial Hospital -Maragusan	Talisay St., Pob. Maragusan, Davao de Oro	LGU
Davao De Oro Provincial Hospital - Montevista	Km. 104 Bankerohan Sur, Montevista, Davao de Oro	LGU
Davao De Oro Provincial	Purok 4, Pob. Laak, Davao del Oro	LGU
Davao De Oro Provincial	Townsite Pantukan, Davao de Oro	LGU
Davao Del Sur Provincial Hospital	Lapu-Lapu St., Digos City, Davao del Sur	LGU
Davao Oriental Provincial Medical Center	Brgy. Matiao, District II, City of Mati, Davao Oriental	LGU
Davao Regional Medical Center	Apokon, Tagum City, Davao del Norte	DOH Retained
Southern Philippines Medical Center	J.P. Laurel Avenue, Bajada, Davao City, Davao del sur	DOH Retained
Sarangani Municipal Hospital	Datu Tagen St., Sarangani, Davao Occidental	LGU

=== Private hospitals ===
Name of Hospital	Location
Panabo Polymedic Hospital, Inc.	Quirino, Gredu, Panabo City, Davao Del Norte
Rivera Medical Center, Inc.	7302 San Francisco, Panabo, Davao Del Norte
Medical Mission Group Hospital And Health Services Cooperative Of Tagum	Prk. Rambutan, Visayan Village, Tagum City, Davao Del Norte
Tagum Doctors’ Hospital, Inc.	Highway 54, Rabe Subd., Visayan Village, Tagum City
Bishop Joseph Regan Memorial Hospital	Christ the King Road, Brgy. Apokon, Tagum City, Davao Del Norte
St. Benedict Hospital Of Davao Del Sur. Inc.	National Highway, Sinaragan, Matanao, Davao Del Sur
United Davao Specialists Hospital and Medical Center, Inc.	Km. 4, Gen. Douglas MacArthur Highway, Barangay Ma-a, Talomo District, Davao City
Metro Davao Medical And Research Center, Inc.	Km. 4 J.P. Laurel Ave., Bajada, 19-B Poblacion District, Davao City, Davao Del Sur
Davao Medical School Foundation, Inc.	Dr. A Gahol Avenue, Bajada, Brgy. 19-B, Poblacion District, Bajada, Davao City
Anda Riverview Medical Center, Inc.	Brgy. 2-A, Magallanes St., Davao City, Davao Del Sur
Ricardo Limso Medical Center, Inc.	V. Illustre St., Davao City
Adventist Hospital-Davao, Inc.	Km 7, McArthur Highway, Bangkal, Davao City, Davao Del Sur
Gig Oca Robles Seamen'S Hospital	R. Castillo St., Brgy. Centro, Agdao, Davao City, Davao del sur
Alterado General Hospital. Inc.	R. Castillo St., Brgy. Centro, Agdao, Davao City, Davao del sur
Medical Mission Group Hospital And Health Services Cooperative Of Davao	3rd Avenue, Leon Garcia Street, Davao City, Davao Del Sur
Lanang Premiere Doctors Hospital, Inc.	Davao Park District, Dakudao Loop, Lanang San Antonio, Agdao Davao City, Davao Del Sur
Digos Doctors’ Hospital, Inc	McArthur Highway, Kiagot, Digos City, Davao Del Sur
Gonzales Maranan Medical Center, Inc.	Quezon Avenue, Digos City, Davao
Medical Center Of Digos Cooperative	National Highway, Tres de Mayo, Digos City, Davao del Sur
Brokenshire Integrated Health Ministries, Inc.	Brokenshire Heights, Madapo, Brgy. 8A, Davao City, Davao Del Sur
Davao Doctors Hospital	118 E. Quirino Avenue, Davao City
San Pedro Hospital Of Davao City, Inc.	C. Guzman Street, Brgy. 14- B, Davao City
Somoso General Hospital	Quezon St., Panabo City

== Region 12 Soccsksargen Center for Health Development ==
=== Government hospitals ===
Name of Hospitals	Location	Class
Norala District Hospital	M. Roxas St., Corner Boston St., Poblacion, Norala, South Cotabato	Provincial LGU
Dr.Jorge P. Royeca Hospital	E. Fernandez St., Lagao, Gen. Santos City	LGU
Soccsksargen General Hospital	Crossing Curva, Brgy. Dajay, Surallah, South Cotabato	DOH Retained
Dr. Cornelio T. Martinez, Sr. Memorial Hospital	Datu Dani St., Kiamba, Sarangani	LGU
Sarangani Provincial Hospital - Malungon	Purok Maliwanag, Poblacion, Malungon, Sarangani, Province	LGU
Sarangani Provincial Hospital - Glan	D. Cania St., Poblacion, Glan, Sarangani Province	LGU
Sarangani Provincial Hospital	Capitol Complex, Alabel, Sarangani	Provincial LGU
Aleosan District Hospital	Dualing, Aleosan, Cotabato	LGU
Carmen Municipal Hospital	Rosal St., Pob. Carmen, Cotabato	LGU
Cotabato Provincial Hospital	Amas, Kidapawan City, Cotabato	Provincial LGU
Mlang District Hosp.	Rizal St., Pob. B, Mlang Cotabato	LGU
University Of Southern Mindanao(Usm) Hosp.	USM Compound, Kabacan, Cotabato	School
Dr. Amado B. Diaz Provincial Hospital	Poblacion, Midsayap, North Cotabato	LGU
Cotabato Sanitarium and General Hospital	Brgy. Ungap Pinaring, Sultan Kudarat, Maguindanao del Norte	DOH Retained
South Cotabato Provincial Hospital	Koronadal City, South Cotabato	Provincial LGU
Sultan Kudarat Provincial Hospital	National Highway, Kalawag III, Isulan, Sultan Kudarat	Provincial LGU
Cotabato Regional and Medical Center	Sinsuat Avenue, Cotabato City	DOH Retained

=== Private hospitals ===
Name of Hospital	Location
Mindanao Doctors Hospital And Cancer Center, Inc.	National Highway, Brgy. Osias, Kabacan, North Cotabato
Mlang Specialists Medical Center (Msmc), Inc.	Purok 2, Barangay Sangat, Mlang, North Cotabato
Anecito T. Pesante Sr. Memorial Hospital	Poblacion I, Midsayap, North Cotabato
Kidapawan Medical Specialists Center, Inc.	Sudapin, Kidapawan City, North Cotabato
Howard Hubbard Memorial Hospital	Polomolok, South Cotabato
Mindanao Medical Center, Inc.	Cannery Road, City Heights, General Santos City
General Santos Doctors’ Hospital, Inc.	National Highway, General Santos City
Socsargen County Hospital	Bula-lagao Road, cor. Arradaza St., General Santos City
Gensan Medical Center	Purok Veterans, National
Sarangani Bay Specialists Medical Center Inc.	National Highway, Major Junction, Brgy. Apopong, General Santos City
Dr. Arturo P. Pingoy Medical Center	General Santos Drive, Zone IV, Koronadal City, South Cotabato
Allah Valley Medical Specialists Center, Inc.	Purok Villegas, General Santos Drive, Koronadal City
Dr. Domingo B. Tamondong Memorial Hospital & College Foundation, Inc.	Purok Liwayway, Ala Esperanza, Sultan Kudarat
St. Louis Hospital	Purok Yellowbell, New Isabela, Tacurong City
Notre Dame Hospital And Siena College Of Cotabato, Inc.	Purok No. 01, Governor Gutierrez Avenue, Barangay Rosary Heights IX, Cotabato City
St. Elizabeth Hospital, Inc.	National Highway, General Santos City

== Region 13 CARAGA Center for Health Development ==
=== Government hospitals ===
Name of Hospital	Location	Class
Bunawan District Hospital	Bunawan, Agusan del Sur	LGU
Talacogon District Hospital	San Isidro, Talacogon, Agusan del Sur	LGU
Agusan Del Norte Provincial Hospital	Libertad, Butuan City	LGU
Hinatuan District Hospital	Hinatuan, Surigao del Sur	LGU
Madrid District Hospital	Madrid, Surigao del Sur	LGU
Lianga District Hospital	Lianga, Surigao del Sur	LGU
Bislig District Hospital	National Hiway, Bislig City	LGU
Surigao Del Norte Provincial Hosp.	Brgy. Sta. Cruz, Placer, Surigao del Norte	LGU
Butuan Medical Center	Km. 5, Baan, Butuan City	LGU
Adela Serra Ty Memorial Medical Center	Capitol Hills, Telaje, Tandag City, Surigao del Sur	DOH Retained
Caraga Regional Hospital	Rizal St., Surigao City	DOH Retained
D.O. Plaza Memorial Hospital	Patin-ay, Prosperidad, Agusan del Sur	LGU
Siargao Island Medical Center	Dapa, Surigao del Norte	DOH Retained

=== Private hospitals ===
Name of Hospital	Location
Butuan Puericulture Center No. 394, Inc.	702 San Jose St., Butuan City
Butuan Doctors’ Hospital	J.C. Aquino Ave., Butuan City
San Francisco Doctors Hospital, Inc.	Brgy. Hubang, San Francisco, Agusan del Sur
St. Paul Surigao University Hospital, Inc.	National Highway, Km. 4, Barangay Luna, Surigao City
Andres Soriano Memorial Hospital Cooperative	Purok 1, Brgy. Cumawas, Bislig City, Surigao del Sur
Manuel J. Santos Hospital	554 Montilla Blvd., Butuan City

== CAR Cordillera Center for Health Development ==
=== Government hospitals ===
Name of Hospital	Location	Class
Abra Provincial Hospital	Barangay Calaba, Bangued	LGU
Conner District Hospital	Ripang, Conner	DOH Retained
Far North Luzon General Hospital and Training Center	Quirino, Luna, Apayao	DOH Retained
Dennis Molintas District Hospital	Daclan, Bokod	LGU
Atok District Hospital	Sayangan, Paoay, Atok	LGU
Potia District Hospital	Sta. Maria, Alfonso Lista	LGU
Panopdopan District Hospital	Bannit St., Mabato-bato, Lamut	LGU
Kalinga Provincial Hospital	Purok 6, Bulanao, Tabuk City	LGU
Bontoc General Hospital	Upper Caluttit, Bontoc	LGU
Besao District Hospital	Kin- iway, Besao	LGU
Paracelis District Hospital	Poblacion, Paracelis, Mountain Province	LGU
Benguet General Hospital	Km. 5, Pico, La Trinidad, Benguet	LGU
Luis Hora Memorial Regional Hospital	Abatan, Bauko, Mountain Province	DOH Retained
Baguio General Hospital and Medical Center	Governor Pack Road, Baguio City, Benguet	DOH Retained

=== Private hospitals ===
Name of Hospital	Location
Cordillera Hospital Of The Divine Grace Inc.	MB-73 Puguis, La Trinidad, Benguet
Pines City Doctors’ Hospital	Magsaysay Avenue, Baguio City, Benguet
Notre Dame De Chartres Hospital	#25 General Luna Road, Baguio City, Benguet
Saint Louis University - Hospital of the Sacred Heart	Assumption Road Ext., Baguio City, Benguet
Bangued Christian Hospital	Torrijos St. Zone 5, Bangued
Baguio Medical Center	Military Cut-off, Baguio City

== BARMM Ministry of Health - BARMM ==
=== Government hospitals ===
Name of Hospital	Location	Class
Buluan District Hospital	National Highway, Poblacion Buluan, Maguindanao del Sur	MOH-BARMM
Camp Siongco Station Hospital	Brgy. Awang, Datu Odin Sinsuat, Maguindanao del Norte	DND
Datu Odin Municipal Hospital	Dalican, Datu Odin Sinsuat, Maguindanao del Norte	MOH-BARMM
Datu Blah T. Sinsuat District Hospital	Rizal St., Brgy. Nuro, Upi, Maguindanao del Norte	MOH-BARMM
South Upi Municipal Hospital	Romongaob, South Upi, Maguindanao del Sur	MOH-BARMM
Dr. Serapio B. Montaner Jr., Al Hajj Memorial Hospital	Brg. Mabul, Malabang, Lanao del Sur	MOH-BARMM
Unayan District Hospital	Brgy. Pagalamatan, Binidayan, Lanao del Sur	MOH-BARMM
Balindong District Hospital	Brgy. Salipongan, Balindong, Lanao del Sur	MOH-BARMM
Wao District Hospital	Brgy. Western Wao, Wao, Lanao del Sur	MOH-BARMM
Tamparan District Hospital	Brgy. Picarabawan, Tamparan, Lanao del Sur	MOH-BARMM
Sulu Provincial Hospital	Brgy. Asturias, Jolo, Sulu	MOH-BARMM
Parang District Hospital	Brgy. Kanaway, Parang, Sulu	MOH-BARMM
Luuk District Hospital	Al-layon St., Tubig Putih, Luuk	MOH-BARMM
Siasi District Hospital	Brgy. Campo Islam, Siasi, Sulu	MOH-BARMM
Datu Halun Sakilan Memorial Hospital	Brgy. Lamion, Bongao, Tawi- Tawi	MOH-BARMM
Cotabato Sanitarium	Brgy. Poblacion Sapa Sapa, Tawi Tawi	MOH-BARMM
Iranun District Hospital	Parang	MOH-BARMM

=== Private hospitals ===
Name of Hospital	Location
Dr. Jose Ma Torres Memorial Hospital Inc	Torres St., Brgy. Maganda, Lamitan City
Tamparan Medical Foundation Inc. Hospital	Brgy. Picarabawan, Tamparan, Lanao del Sur
Dr. Abdullah Hospital	New Capitol, Marawi City
Mindalano Specialist Hospital Foundation Inc.	Brgy. Panggao Saduc, Marawi City
Ediborah P. Yap Memorial Hospital	Brgy. Limook, Lamitan City
Salaam Hospital Foundation Inc.	Brgy. Papandayan, Marawi City
Cotabato Medical Specialist Hospital	Quezon Avenue, Rosary Heights, Cotabato City
Cotabato Puericulture Center and General Hospital Foundation, Inc.	Alonzo St., Poblacion 6, Cotabato City
Eros Medical Clinic and Hospital	Lawaan St., Brgy. Poblacion, Datu Paglas, Maguindanao del Sur
United Doctors Hospital of Cotabato City, Inc.	ND Avenue, Immaculada Concepcion Rosary Heights II, Cotabato City
