= SIMC =

SIMC may refer to:

- Singapore International Mediation Centre
- System identyfikatorów i nazw miejscowości, a Polish government identifier for places.
- Sendai International Music Competition
- Samar Island Medical Center
- Southern Isabela Medical Center
- Siargao Island Medical Center
