= ZCMC =

ZCMC may refer to:

- Zamboanga City Medical Center, a hospital in the Philippines
- Zangezur Copper and Molybdenum Combine, a mining company based in Armenia
