= Metropolitan Medical Center =

Private hospital in Manila, Philippines

Geography
- Location: G. Masangkay Street, Santa Cruz, Manila, Philippines
- Coordinates: 14°36′33.80″N 120°58′43.33″E

Organization
- Type: General

History
- Opened: 1962

Links
- Website: metropolitanmedicalcenter.com.ph
- Lists: Hospitals in the Philippines

Metropolitan Medical Center (simplified Chinese: 光坦纪念医院; traditional Chinese: 光坦紀念醫院; pinyin: Guāngtǎn Jìniàn Yīyuàn; Pe̍h-ōe-jī: Kng-tháⁿ Kì-liām I-īⁿ; abbreviated as MMC) is a private tertiary referral hospital located at G. Masangkay Street in Santa Cruz, Manila. The hospital is based in a 27-storey medical tower, and is fully equipped with diagnostic equipment and a fully automated diagnostic laboratory. It is staffed by more than 300 doctors. A wide range of specialties are covered up to tertiary care level, including internal medicine, endoscopy, surgery (including bariatric surgery and renal transplantation), dentistry, obstetrics and gynecology, dermatology and physical rehabilitation. The hospital has interests in developing medical tourism.

As of early 2008, the Chief Executive Officer was Dr. Joel Beltran, MD.

Currently the hospital is not subject to international healthcare accreditation, whether sourced from the United States, the United Kingdom or Australia.

== History ==
The hospital was formed in 1962, when six visionaries saw the future of medical care. A group of renown doctors (namely, Dr. Pacifico Yap, Dr. Victor So Yee Piu, Dr. Go Kiat Su), and a group of top businessmen from Christian Gospel Church (namely Mr. James Cu, Mr. Amado Lim, and his younger brother, Mr. Lim Kong Gee) envisioned putting up a tertiary level hospital in the heart of downtown Manila. Mr. Amado Lim served as the MMC's first Chairman.
