= De Los Santos Medical Center =

Private hospital in Quezon City, Philippines

- Metro Pacific Investments Corporation

Geography
- Location: Quezon City, Manila, Philippines
- Coordinates: 14°37′13″N 121°01′04″E

Services
- Beds: 150

History
- Opened: November 17, 1973

Links
- Website: delossantosmed.ph
- Lists: Hospitals in the Philippines

De Los Santos Medical Center is a 150-bed private tertiary hospital in Quezon City, Philippines, managed by Metro Pacific.

== History ==
The history of the De Los Santos Medical Center can be traced back to a small family-owned clinic by couple Jose Sr. and Pacita V. De Los Santos which opened in September 17, 1949. Delos Santos Sr. was an orthopedic. The private clinic specializes on patients with bone conditions and the couple are motivated by their two daughters who had polio.

After the De Los Santos' two sons grew up to be doctors themselves, the De Los Santos Clinic along E. Rodriguez Avenue reopened as the De Los Santos General Hospital on November 17, 1973.

In December 2012, Metro Pacific Investments Corporation (MPIC) began the process of acquiring majority stakes over the hospital. By June 2013, the acquisition of 51 percent stakes was completed.

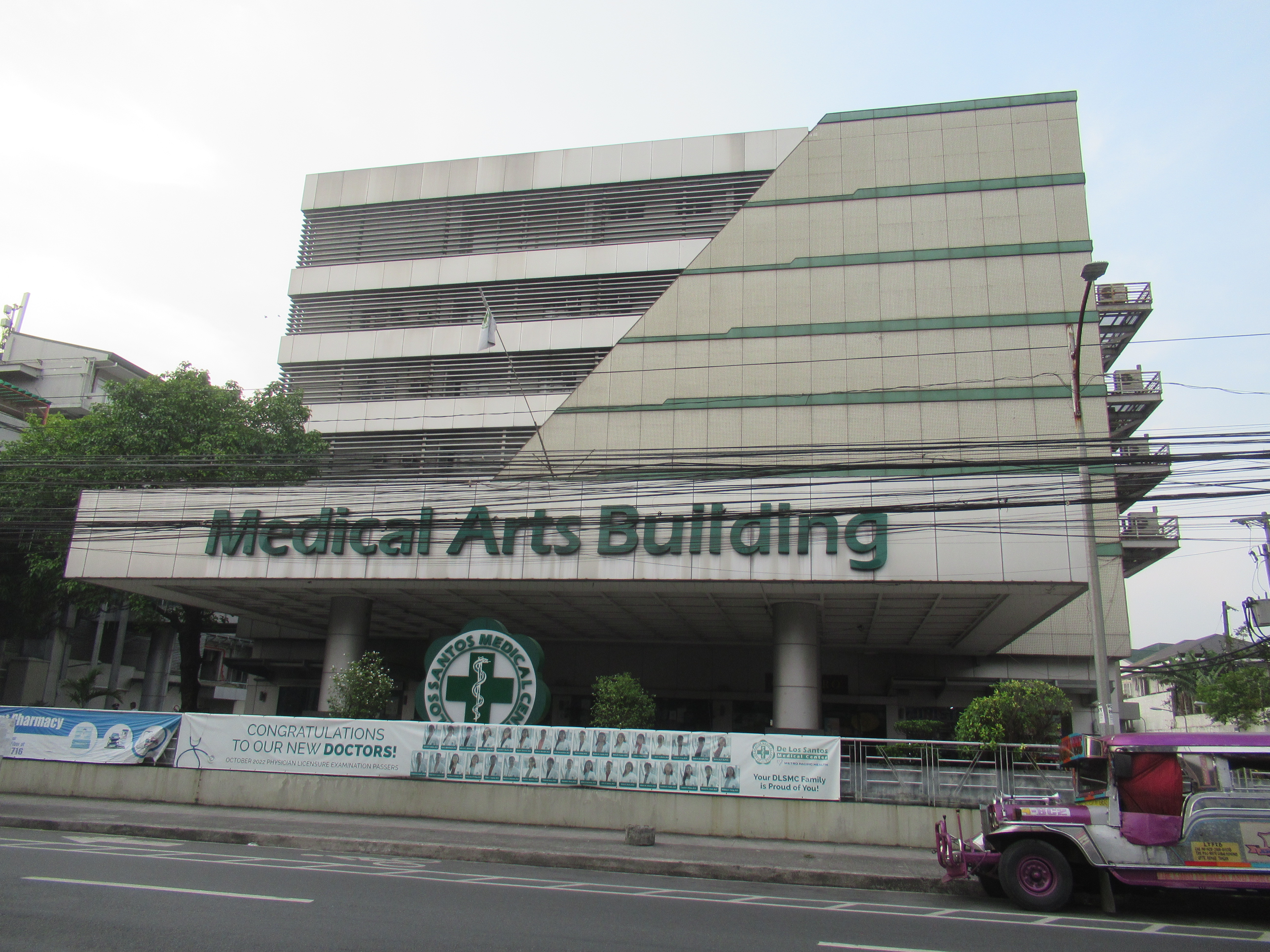
Medical Arts Building

== Management ==
The hospital is run by De Los Santos General Hospital Inc. (DLSGHI) with the Metro Pacific Investments having a majority stakes on DLSGHI.
