= WVMC =

WVMC may refer to:

- WVMC-FM, a radio station (90.7 FM) licensed to Mansfield, Ohio, United States
- WVMC (AM), a defunct radio station (1360 AM) formerly licensed to Mount Carmel, Illinois, United States
- Western Visayas Medical Center, a public hospital in the Philippines
