= Dr. Paulino J. Garcia Memorial Research and Medical Center =

Government hospital in Nueva Ecija, Philippines

Dr. Paulino J. Garcia Memorial Research and Medical Center (PJGMRMC)

Geography
- Location: Cabanatuan, Nueva Ecija, Central Luzon, Philippines
- Coordinates: 15°29′21″N 120°58′22″E

Organization
- Type: tertiary level hospital

Services
- Beds: 1000

Links
- Website: drpjgmrmc.doh.gov.ph

The Dr. Paulino J. Garcia Memorial Research and Medical Center is a tertiary level government hospital in the Philippines with an authorized bed capacity of one thousand (1000). It is located along Mabini Street, Brgy. Quezon District, Cabanatuan, Nueva Ecija.
