= Socsargen County Hospital =

Private hospital in General Santos, Philippines

SOCSARGEN County Hospital
- Mt. Matutum Medical Center, Inc.
- Location within Mindanao Location within Philippines

Geography
- Location: Arradaza St. corner Bula-Lagao Road, General Santos, Philippines
- Coordinates: 6°07′06″N 125°11′23″E

Organization
- Care system: Private
- Type: General

Services
- Emergency department: Yes
- Beds: 240

History
- Founded: 29 May 1992

Links
- Website: socsargenhospital.weebly.com

The SOCSARGEN County Hospital is a 240-bed hospital in General Santos, in the southern part of Mindanao, Philippines. It is owned and operated by Mt. Matutum Medical Center, Inc.

== See also ==
- List of hospitals in Philippines
