= Batangas Medical Center =

Government hospital in Batangas, Philippines

Batangas Medical Center (BatMC)

Geography
- Location: Batangas City, Batangas, Calabarzon, Philippines
- Coordinates: 13°46′01″N 121°04′00″E

Organization
- Funding: Government hospital
- Type: tertiary level hospital

Services
- Beds: 1000

Links
- Website: batmc.doh.gov.ph

The Batangas Medical Center (BatMC) is a tertiary level government hospital in the Philippines. It is located at Bihi Road, Kumintang Ibaba, Batangas City.

In 1992, the then Batangas Regional Hospital was authorized to increase its bed capacity from two hundred beds to two hundred fifty beds. In 2009, it was renamed to its current name and was authorized to expand into a three hundred bed hospital. In 2019, its authorized bed capacity was further increased to one thousand.
