= Ilocos Training and Regional Medical Center =

Government hospital in La Union, Philippines

Geography
- Location: San Fernando, La Union, Ilocos Region, Philippines
- Coordinates: 16°35′28″N 120°19′06″E

Organization
- Funding: Government hospital
- Type: tertiary level teaching and training hospital

Services
- Beds: 300

Links
- Website: itrmc.doh.gov.ph

The Ilocos Training and Regional Medical Center is a tertiary level teaching and training government hospital in the Philippines. It is located at Brgy. Parian, San Fernando, La Union.

In 1992, the then Ilocos Regional Hospital was authorized to increase its carters capacity from one hundred fifty beds to two hundred beds. In 1997, it was authorized by the national law to expand into a three hundred bed hospital.
