= Region I Medical Center =

Government hospital in Dagupan, Philippines

Geography
- Location: Dagupan, Pangasinan, Ilocos Region, Philippines
- Coordinates: 16°02′55″N 120°20′28″E

Organization
- Funding: Government hospital
- Type: tertiary level hospital

Services
- Beds: 1,500

Links
- Website: r1mc.doh.gov.ph

The Region I Medical Center is a tertiary level government hospital in the Philippines with an authorized bed capacity of one thousand five hundred (1,500). It is located along Arellano Street, Dagupan.
