= Bicol Regional Hospital and Medical Center =

Government hospital in Albay, Philippines

Bicol Regional Hospital and Medical Center (BRHMC)
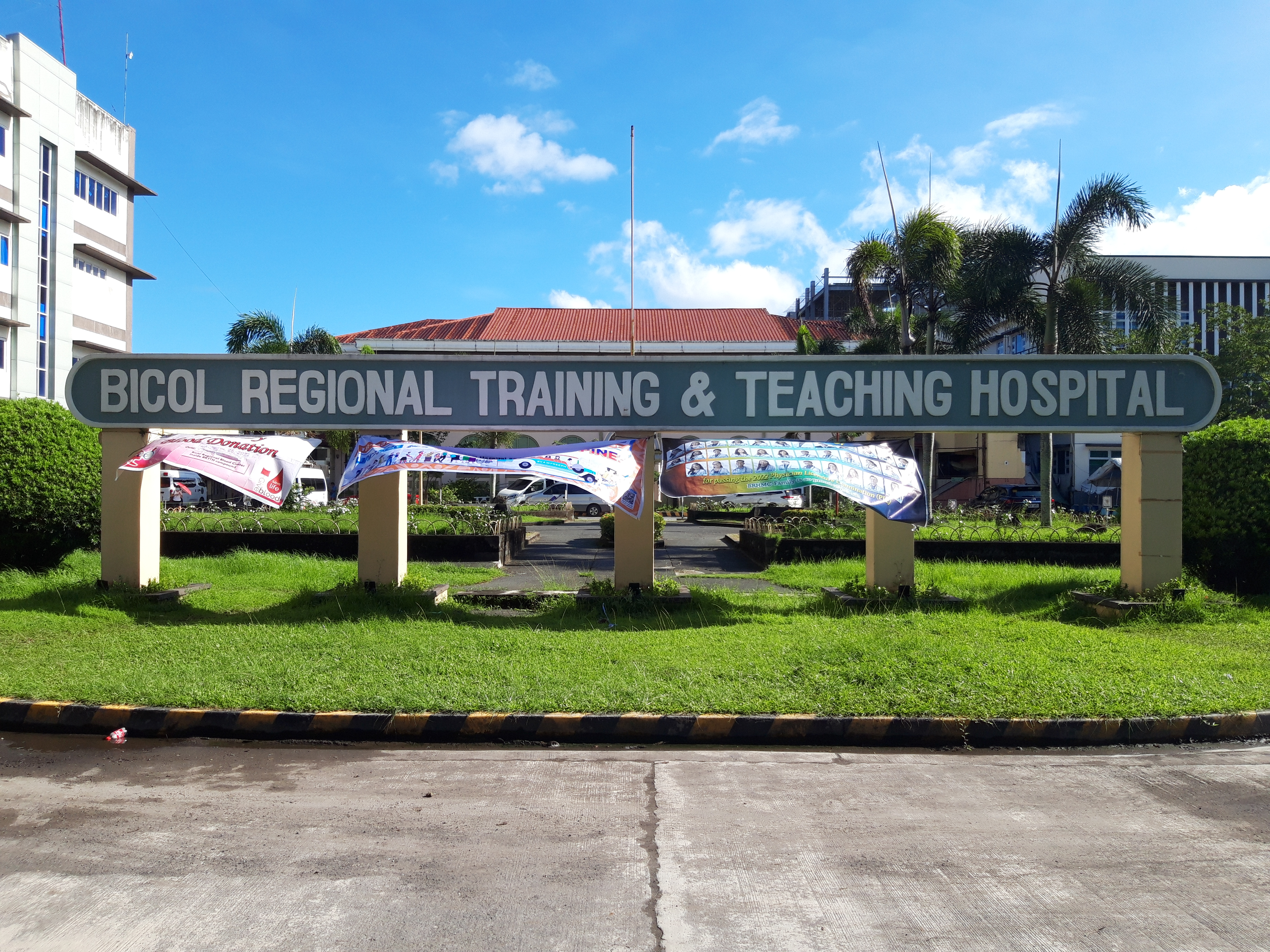

Geography
- Location: Brgy. Sagpon, Daraga, Albay, Bicol Region, Philippines
- Coordinates: 13°08′50″N 123°43′29″E

Organization
- Funding: Government hospital
- Type: tertiary level hospital

Services
- Beds: 800

Links
- Website: brhmc.doh.gov.ph

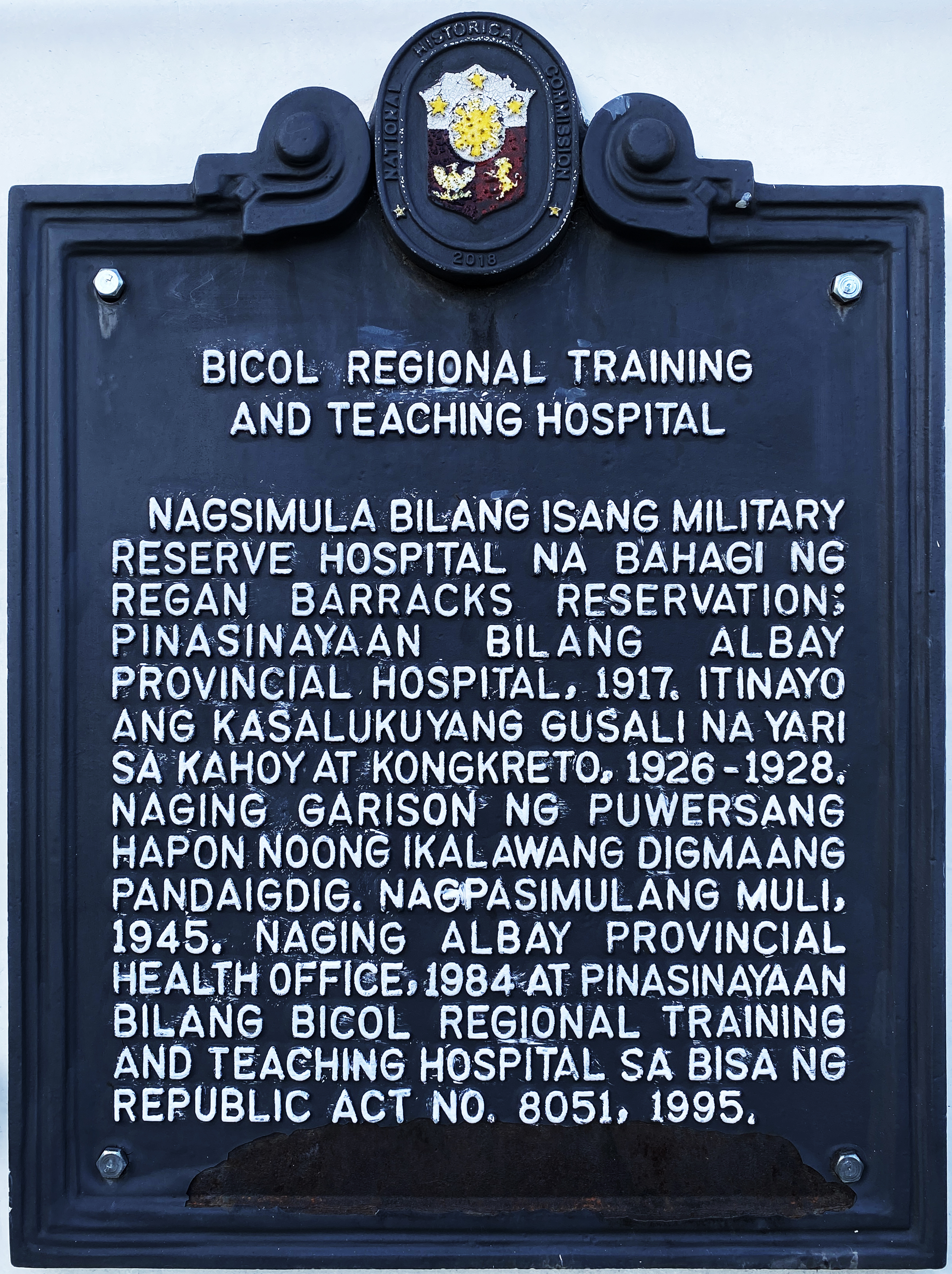
National historical marker installed in 2018

The Bicol Regional Hospital and Medical Center (BRHMC) (formerly, Bicol Regional Training and Teaching Hospital (BRTTH)) is a tertiary level government hospital in the Philippines with an authorized bed capacity of eight hundred (800). It is located in Daraga, Albay.
