= Cebu Doctors' University Hospital =

Private hospital in Cebu City, Philippines

Cebu Doctors’ University Hospital
- CebuDoc Group

- Location within Visayas Location within Philippines

Geography
- Location: Cebu City, Philippines
- Coordinates: 10°18′52″N 123°53′31″E

Organization
- Care system: Private

History
- Former name: Cebu Doctors' Hospital
- Opened: August 20, 1972; 53 years ago

Links
- Website: cebudocgroup.com
- Lists: Hospitals in the Philippines

Cebu Doctors’ University Hospital (CDUH), known as Cebu Doctors' Hospital until 2006, is a major tertiary private hospital in Cebu City, Philippines. The 300-bed hospital was inaugurated on August 20, 1972.

== History ==
Cebu Doctors' Hospital is a comprehensive medical education and research complex. In the Visayas and Mindanao region of the Philippines, the CDUH was the first hospital offering nuclear medicine services, commencing in 1990. It was also the first hospital in the region to acquire a 64 slice MSCT, in 2006.

In 2011 Cebu Doctors' University Hospital was accredited by QHA Trent Accreditation from the UK.
