= Amang Rodriguez Memorial Medical Center =

Government hospital in Marikina, Philippines

Amang Rodriguez Memorial Medical Center (ARMMC)

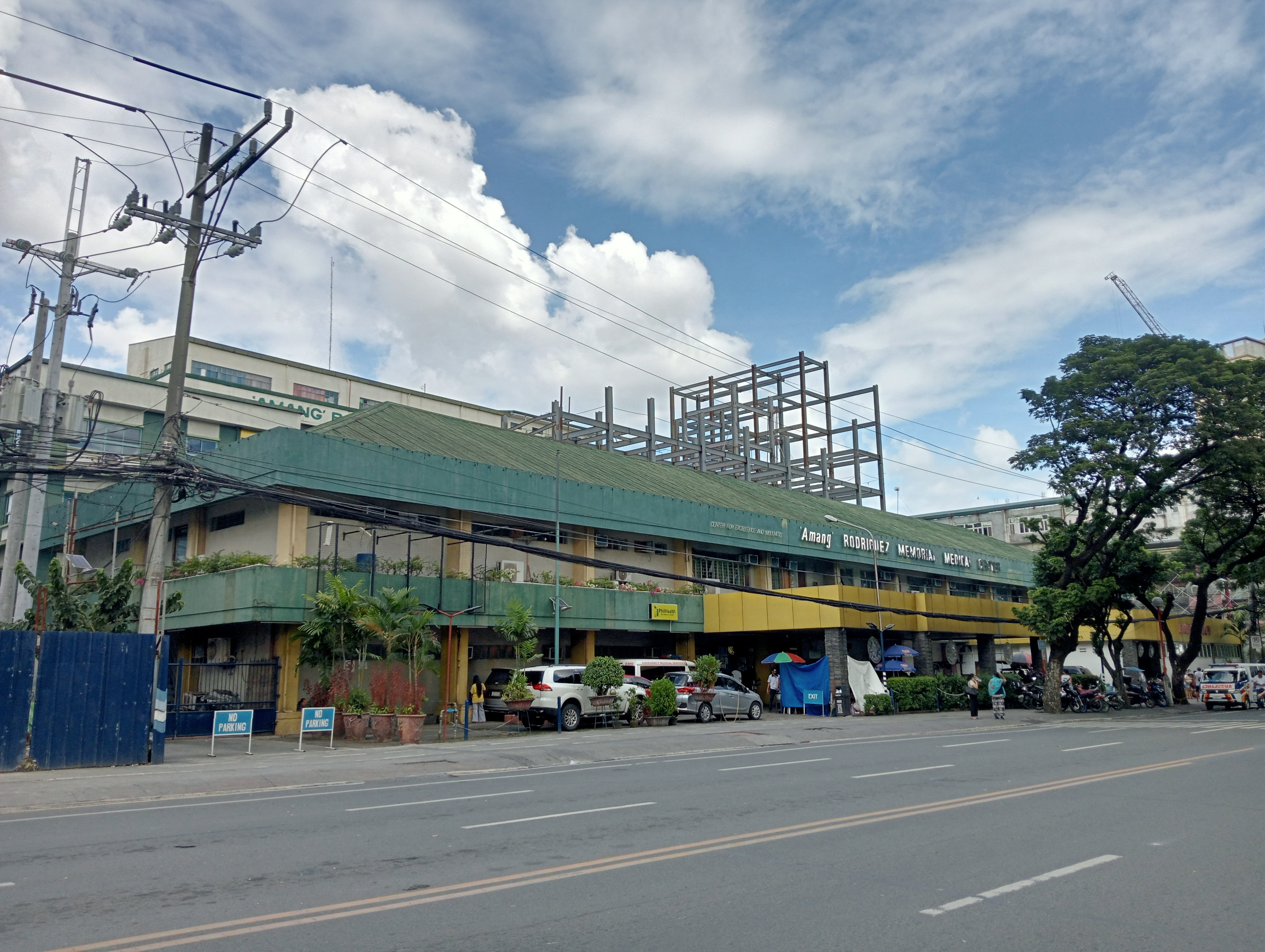
- The hospital in 2023

Geography
- Location: Marikina, Metro Manila, NCR, Philippines
- Coordinates: 14°38′10″N 121°05′54″E

Organization
- Funding: Government hospital
- Type: tertiary level hospital

Services
- Beds: 500

History
- Opened: 1966

Links
- Website: armmc.doh.gov.ph

The 'Amang' Rodriguez Memorial Medical Center (ARMMC) (formerly Rodriguez Sr. Emergency Hospital and Eulogio Rodriguez, Sr. Memorial Hospital) is a tertiary level government hospital in the Philippines with an authorized bed capacity of five hundred beds. It is located along Sumulong Highway in Barangay Santo Niňo, Marikina.

== History ==
A cornerstone-laying ceremony to mark the construction of Marikina Emergency Hospital was held on May 3, 1963.

The hospital was inaugurated in 1966 as Rodriguez Sr. Emergency Hospital, and by 1969 was renamed Eulogio Rodriguez, Sr. Memorial Hospital (ERSMH).

In 1995, through Republic Act No. 8019, the hospital was upgraded to a medical center and renamed 'Amang' Rodriguez Medical Center (ARMC). By 2007, the hospital's bed capacity was increased from 150 to 300 through Republic Act No. 9419, with the word "Memorial" added back to the hospital's name.
