= Bicol Medical Center =

Government hospital in Camarines Sur, Philippines

Geography
- Location: Naga, Camarines Sur, Bicol Region, Philippines
- Coordinates: 13°37′26″N 123°11′56″E

Organization
- Funding: Government hospital
- Type: tertiary level hospital

Services
- Beds: 1000

Links
- Website: bmc.doh.gov.ph

The Bicol Medical Center (BMC) is a tertiary level government hospital in the Philippines with an authorized bed capacity of one thousand (1000). It is located along BMC Road, Concepcion Pequeňa, Naga, Camarines Sur.
