= Gov. Celestino Gallares Memorial Hospital =

Government hospital in Bohol, Philippines

Gov. Celestino Gallares Memorial Hospital (GCGMH)

Geography
- Location: Tagbilaran, Bohol, Central Visayas, Philippines
- Coordinates: 9°38′39″N 123°51′26″E

Organization
- Funding: Government hospital
- Type: tertiary level hospital

Services
- Beds: 525

Links
- Website: www.gcgmh.gov.ph

The Gov. Celestino Gallares Memorial Hospital (GCGMH) is a tertiary level government hospital in the Philippines with an authorized bed capacity of five hundred twenty five (525). It is located at 53 Miguel Parras Street, Tagbilaran, Bohol.
