= Mariano Marcos Memorial Hospital and Medical Center =

Government hospital in Ilocos Norte, Philippines

Mariano Marcos Memorial Hospital and Medical Center (MMMH&MC)

Geography
- Location: Batac, Ilocos Norte, Ilocos Region, Philippines
- Coordinates: 18°03′38″N 120°33′34″E

Organization
- Funding: Government hospital
- Type: tertiary level hospital

Services
- Beds: 700

Links
- Website: mmmhmc.doh.gov.ph

The Mariano Marcos Memorial Hospital and Medical Center (MMMH&MC) is a tertiary level government hospital in the Philippines with an authorized bed capacity of seven hundred (700). It is located at Brgy. 6, Batac, Ilocos Norte.
