= Tondo Medical Center =

Government hospital in Manila, Philippines

- Department of Health

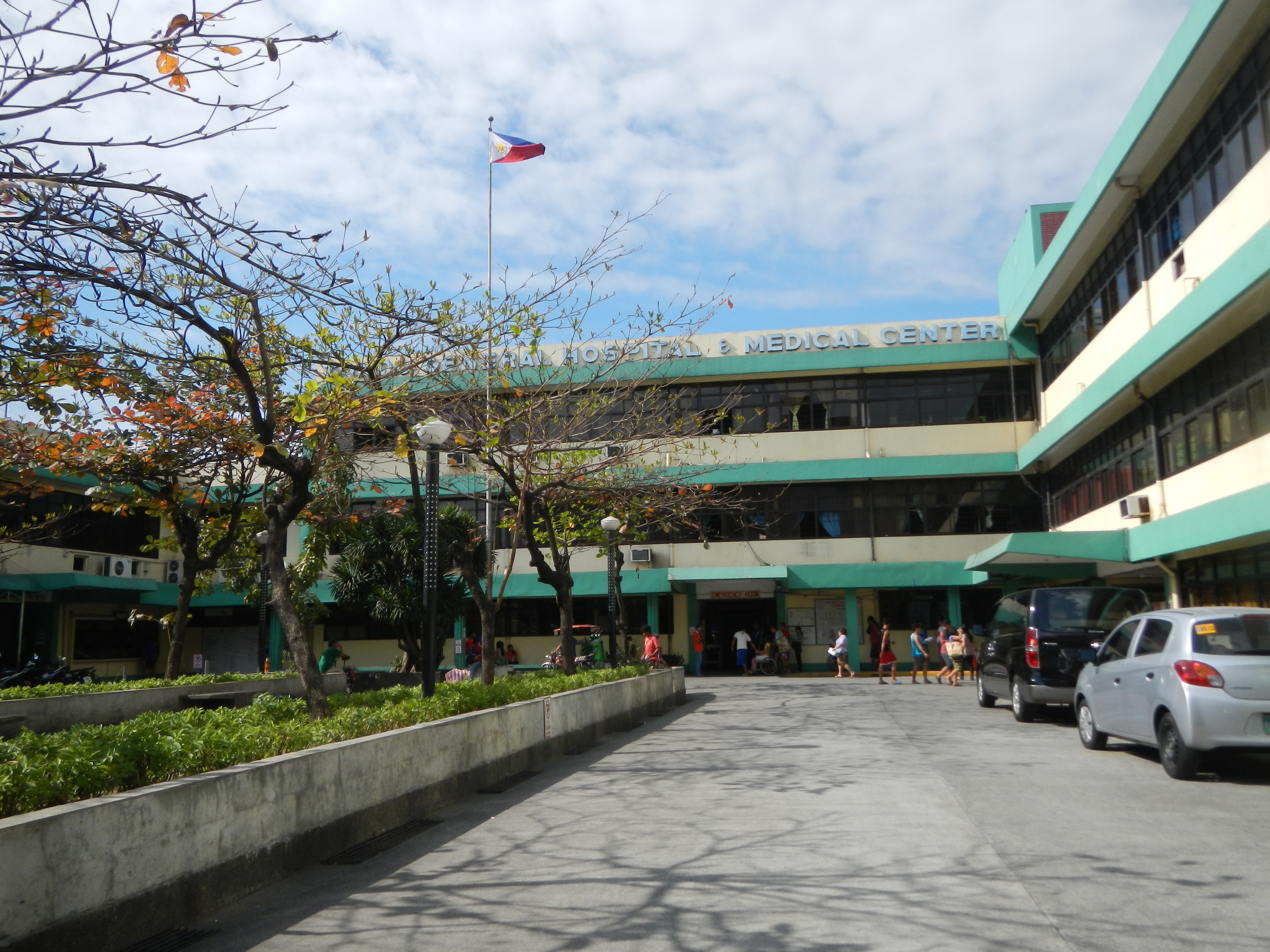
- Tondo Medical Center edifice

Geography
- Location: Tondo, Manila, Philippines
- Coordinates: 14°38′06″N 120°57′47″E

Organization
- Care system: Public
- Type: General, public

Services
- Beds: 300

History
- Opened: 1971

Links
- Website: www.tmc.doh.gov.ph
- Lists: Hospitals in the Philippines

The Tondo Medical Center, also known as Tondo Med, is a 300-bed capacity tertiary public medical center established in 1971, under the supervision and control of the Department of Health (DOH). It is located on North Bay Boulevard, Tondo, Manila, Philippines. Tondo Med has eight hospital departments, all of which are currently accredited with their respective specialty societies except for EENT and Radiology which are still in the process of accreditation with the DOH.

== History ==
In January 1971, the hospital started as the Tondo Annex of the Jose R. Reyes Memorial Hospital. By virtue of Republic Act 6375 on July 16, 1971, the ownership and possession of a lot, building, and other physical plants, equipment, tools, implements, records, funds, appropriations and personnel were transferred to the Hospital Board in the name of the Tondo General Hospital and Medical Center.

It was established and operated in and for the District of Tondo, City of Manila as a non-profit public institution and its purpose being primarily to give free in-patient and out-patient medical care to as many residents of the District of Tondo. Under this Act, the hospital shall have a bed capacity of not less than one hundred (100). Ninety percent of which shall be devoted exclusively to charity patients.

On January 30, 1987, Executive Order No. 119 was passed reorganizing the Ministry of Health and its attached agencies. Tondo General Hospital and Medical Center created as a government corporation under Republic Act 6375 was dissolved and all its assets, liabilities, properties and personnel were transferred to Tondo Medical Center under the Department of Health.

The Hospital is Philhealth accredited with all major departments accredited by their medical societies. The hospital is also a key player of DOH programs and continuous to be an effective partner with local government units in providing health care.

With the enactment of Republic Act 11331 on April 17, 2019, Tondo Med's bed capacity was increased to 300, its professional health care services and facilities were upgraded, and its medical personnel were increased.
