= Region II Trauma and Medical Center =

Government hospital in Nueva Vizcaya, Philippines

Geography
- Location: AH26, Barangay Magsaysay, Bayombong, Nueva Vizcaya, Cagayan Valley, Philippines
- Coordinates: 16°29′00″N 121°08′04″E

Organization
- Type: tertiary level hospital

Services
- Beds: 500

History
- Founded: 1911

Links
- Website: riitmc.doh.gov.ph

The Region II Trauma and Medical Center is a tertiary level government hospital in the Philippines with an authorized bed capacity of five hundred. It is located in Bayombong, Nueva Vizcaya.

== History ==
Established in 1911, the hospital was renamed as the Bayombong Hospital in 1925 and later the Major Ferdinand E. Marcos Hospital in 1972. It was again renamed as the Major Ferdinand E. Marcos Veterans Regional Hospital in 1974 after it was reclassified as a major hospital of the Cagayan Valley region. After President Ferdinand Marcos' overthrow in the 1986 People Power Revolution, the hospital's status was downgraded to that of a provincial-level hospital and was promptly renamed the Nueva Vizcaya Provincial Hospital. In 1993, the municipal government of Bayombong took control over the hospital's operations. In 1995, the hospital was again placed under the national government's control after its status as a regional hospital was restored in 1995 by President Fidel Ramos, after which, it was renamed the Veterans Regional Hospital.

In 2018, President Rodrigo Duterte signed Republic Act. No. 11081 renaming the hospital into its current name and increasing its current bed capacity from 200 to 500.
