= Adventist Medical Center Manila =

Private hospital in Pasay, Philippines

- Location within Metro Manila Location within Luzon Location within Philippines

Geography
- Location: Pasay, Metro Manila, Philippines
- Coordinates: 14°33′21″N 120°59′43″E

Organization
- Type: Private
- Religious affiliation: Seventh-day Adventist Church
- Affiliated university: Manila Adventist College (formerly Manila Adventist Medical Center and Colleges, Inc.)

Services
- Emergency department: Yes

Helipads
- Helipad: No

History
- Former names: Manila Adventist Medical Center; Manila Sanitarium and Hospital
- Founded: July 1929

Links
- Website: amcmanila.org

The Adventist Medical Center Manila, (formerly Manila Adventist Medical Center; also Manila Sanitarium and Hospital), is an acute care, tertiary, non-stock, non-profit, and self-supporting private hospital that is located within Pasay in Metro Manila, Philippines. It was established in July 1929 by a missionary doctor - Horace Hall. The hospital is part of a chain of more than 500 health care institutions worldwide operated by the Seventh-day Adventist Church. It is licensed by the Center for Health Development of the Philippine Department of Health, accredited by Medicare, the Philippine Hospital Association and the American Hospital Association.

== See also ==
- List of Seventh-day Adventist hospitals
- List of hospitals in the Philippines
