= Luis Hora Memorial Regional Hospital =

Government hospital in Mountain Province, Philippines

Luis Hora Memorial Regional Hospital (LHMRH)

Geography
- Location: Bauko, Mountain Province, Cordillera Administrative Region, Philippines
- Coordinates: 16.9810°N 120.8538°E

Organization
- Funding: Government hospital
- Type: Level 2

Services
- Beds: 200

Links
- Website: luishora.doh.gov.ph

The Luis Hora Memorial Regional Hospital (LHMRH) is a level 2 government hospital in the Philippines. It is located at Abatan, Bauko, Mountain Province.
