= Cebu South Medical Center =

Government hospital in Cebu, Philippines

Cebu South Medical Center (CSMC)

Geography
- Location: Talisay, Cebu, Central Visayas, Philippines
- Coordinates: 10°15′13″N 123°50′18″E

Organization
- Funding: Government hospital

Links
- Website: csmc.doh.gov.ph

The Cebu South Medical Center (CSMC) is a government hospital in the Philippines. It is located in San Isidro, Talisay, Cebu.
