= Basilan Medical Center =

Government hospital in Basilan, Philippines

Geography
- Location: Isabela, Basilan, Zamboanga Peninsula, Philippines
- Coordinates: 6°42′00″N 121°59′18″E

Organization
- Funding: Government hospital

Services
- Beds: 500

Links
- Website: bgh.doh.gov.ph

The Basilan Medical Center (formerly the Basilan General Hospital) is a public hospital located in Isabela, Basilan, Philippines. It was established by virtue of Republic Act No. 8543 with a bed capacity of 100. It was upgraded into a Level III hospital thru Republic Act No. 12056, increasing the hospital's bed capacity from 125 to 500.
