= Ospital ng Palawan =

Government hospital in Puerto Princesa, Philippines

Geography
- Location: Puerto Princesa, Palawan, Mimaropa, Philippines
- Coordinates: 9°44′52″N 118°44′40″E

Organization
- Funding: Government hospital
- Type: primary level hospital

Services
- Beds: 400

Links
- Website: onp.doh.gov.ph

The Ospital ng Palawan is a government hospital in the Philippines with an authorized bed capacity of four hundred (400). It is located along Malvar Street, Puerto Princesa.
