= Margosatubig Regional Hospital =

Government hospital in Zamboanga del Sur, Philippines

Geography
- Location: F. Nightingale St., Poblacion, Margosatubig, Zamboanga del Sur, Zamboanga Peninsula, Philippines
- Coordinates: 7°34′30″N 123°09′52″E

Organization
- Funding: Government hospital
- Type: Level 1 hospital

Services
- Beds: 300

Links
- Website: mrh.doh.gov.ph

The Margosatubig Regional Hospital is a Level 1 government hospital in the Philippines with an authorized bed capacity of three hundred (300). Located in Margosatubig town in Zamboanga del Sur, it was originally established as Margosatubig District Hospital.

== Milestones ==
=== Year 1924 ===
Margosatubig Emergency Hospital was established and started as a small operating rural health unit in 1924. The initial building was constructed thru voluntary contributions in the form of cash, labor and materials by the residents of the town.

=== Year 1948 ===
The hospital was nationalized with an authorized 25-Bed Capacity and operated as a Secondary District Hospital.

=== Year 1992 ===
Republic Act No. 7207 authorized the increase of the Margosatubig District Hospital's Bed Capacity from 25 to 50 beds.

=== Year 1997 ===
Republic Act No. 8412 authorized the conversion of Margosatubig District Hospital into a regional hospital to be known as Margosatubig Regional Hospital and increased its bed capacity to 300 beds.

=== Year 2015 ===
The Implementing Rules and Regulations of RA 8412 was issued through Administrative Order No. 2015-0040 dated September 15, 2015-providing for the Expansion of Services, provision of appropriate Health Human Resources, Equipment, and Infrastructure.

=== Year 2017 ===
ISO 9001:2008 Certified - Quality Management System (August)

=== Year 2018-present ===
ISO 9001:2015 Certified - Quality Management System (July)

==== HFEP projects from 2010 to 2023 ====
Recipient of various infrastructure projects that paved the way for the expansion and improvement of the hospital's facility and service capability particularly in the multi-specialty medical service and clinical diagnostic procedures that greatly improved the patients' access to much needed medical services in this part of the region. There is an approved Multi-Year Contractual Authority (MYCA) for the Construction and Completion of Margosatubig Regional Hospital Medical Center Wards and Departments consisting of a four-storey Ward Building and Central Block Tower 1. The ward building shall provide additional 125 beds - essential in decongesting the different nursing wards.

Implementation of the released 2022 Revised Standard Staffing Pattern for Level III hospitals-199 additional positions for Medical, Nursing, Administrative, and Finance Divisions.

Currently, the MRH is licensed as Level 1 based on AO No. 2012-0012 dated July 18, 2012, the new classification of hospitals.

The hospital is in the process of complying the Level II hospital licensure requirements with slated submission of application in July 2024.
