= Batanes General Hospital =

Government hospital in Batanes, Philippines

Geography
- Location: Basco, Batanes, Cagayan Valley, Philippines
- Coordinates: 20°27′01″N 121°58′14″E

Organization
- Funding: Government hospital

The Batanes General Hospital is a government hospital in the Philippines It is located in Basco, Batanes.
