= Labuan General Hospital =

Government hospital in Zamboanga City, Philippines

Geography
- Location: Zamboanga City, Zamboanga del Sur, Zamboanga Peninsula, Philippines
- Coordinates: 7°05′52″N 121°54′14″E

Organization
- Funding: Government hospital
- Type: Level 1 hospital

Services
- Beds: 100

Links
- Website: lph.doh.gov.ph

The Labuan General Hospital is a Level 1 government hospital in the Philippines with an authorized bed capacity of one hundred (100). It is located in Zamboanga City.
