= Bicol Region General Hospital and Geriatric Medical Center =

Government hospital in Camarines Sur, Philippines

Bicol Region General Hospital and Geriatric Medical Center (BRGHGMC)

Geography
- Location: Cabusao, Camarines Sur, Bicol Region, Philippines
- Coordinates: 13°45′59″N 123°01′53″E

Organization
- Funding: Government hospital

Links
- Website: bicolsanitarium.doh.gov.ph

The Bicol Region General Hospital and Geriatric Medical Center (BRGHGMC) is a government hospital in the Philippines. It is located in San Pedro, Cabusao, Camarines Sur.
