= St. Anthony Mother and Child Hospital =

Government hospital in Cebu CIty, Philippines

St. Anthony Mother and Child Hospital (SAMCH)

Geography
- Location: Cebu City, Central Visayas, Philippines
- Coordinates: 10°17′11″N 123°52′17″E

Organization
- Funding: Government hospital

The St. Anthony Mother and Child Hospital (SAMCH) is a government hospital in the Philippines. It is located along Cabreros Street, Cebu City.
