= Zamboanga City Medical Center =

Public hospital in Zamboanga City, Philippines

Zamboanga City Medical Center (ZCMC)

Geography
- Location: Zamboanga City, Zamboanga del Sur, Zamboanga Peninsula, Philippines
- Coordinates: 6°54′25″N 122°04′53″E

Organization
- Type: tertiary level hospital

Services
- Beds: 800

History
- Founded: 1918

Links
- Website: zcmc.doh.gov.ph

The Zamboanga City Medical Center (ZCMC) is a tertiary level government hospital in the Philippines with an authorized bed capacity of eight hundred (800). It is located along Dr. Evangelista Street, Sta. Catalina, Zamboanga City.
