= Don Emilio del Valle Memorial Hospital =

Government hospital in Bohol, Philippines

Don Emilio del Valle Memorial Hospital (DEDVMH)

Geography
- Location: Bood, Ubay, Bohol, Central Visayas, Philippines
- Coordinates: 10°02′40″N 124°28′28″E

Organization
- Funding: Government hospital

History
- Opened: 2003

Links
- Website: devmh.doh.gov.ph

The Don Emilio del Valle Memorial Hospital (DEDVMH) is a government hospital in the Philippines. It is located in Ubay, Bohol.
