= Samar Island Medical Center =

Future government hospital in Samar, Philippines

Geography
- Location: Calbayog, Samar, Eastern Visayas, Philippines

Organization
- Funding: Government hospital

The Samar Island Medical Center is a planned tertiary level government hospital in the Philippines. It is to be located in Calbayog, Samar.
