= Far North Luzon General Hospital and Training Center =

Government hospital in Apayao, Philippines

Geography
- Location: Luna, Apayao, Cordillera Administrative Region, Philippines
- Coordinates: 18°20′21″N 121°23′02″E

Organization
- Funding: Government hospital

Links
- Website: fnlghtc.doh.gov.ph

The Far North Luzon General Hospital and Training Center is a government hospital in the Philippines. It is located along Abulug-Luna-Pudtol-Kabugao Road, Quirino, Luna, Apayao.
