= Governor Benjamin T. Romualdez General Hospital and Schistosomiasis Center =

Government hospital in Leyte, Philippines

Geography
- Location: Palo, Leyte, Eastern Visayas, Philippines
- Coordinates: 11°09′19″N 124°59′42″E

Organization
- Funding: Government hospital

Services
- Beds: 100

Links
- Website: schistosomiasishospital.doh.gov.ph

The Governor Benjamin T. Romualdez General Hospital and Schistosomiasis Center is a public hospital in the Palo, Philippines. It was originally created as a research arm of the Schistosomiasis Control and Research Service and to provide clinical services to patients of schistosomiasis in the country. Formerly named as Schistosomiasis Control and Research Hospital, it is now authorized to service up to one hundred beds.
