= Eversley Childs Sanitarium and General Hospital =

Government hospital in Mandaue, Philippines

Geography
- Location: Jagobiao, Mandaue, Cebu, Central Visayas, Philippines
- Coordinates: 10°22′00″N 123°57′14″E

Organization
- Funding: Government hospital

Services
- Beds: 200

History
- Former names: Eversley Childs Treatment Station; Eversley Childs Sanitarium
- Opened: May 30, 1930; 95 years ago

Links
- Website: ecs.doh.gov.ph

The Eversley Childs Sanitarium and General Hospital is a government hospital in the Philippines. It is located in Mandaue, Cebu.
