= Cotabato Sanitarium and General Hospital =

Government hospital in Sultan Kudarat, Philippines

- Department of Health

Geography
- Location: Sultan Kudarat, Maguindanao del Norte, Bangsamoro, Philippines
- Coordinates: 7°14′09″N 124°16′09″E

Services
- Beds: 250

Links
- Website: cotsan.doh.gov.ph

The Cotabato Sanitarium and General Hospital is a DOH-retained Level II Philhealth accredited facility in the Philippines. It is located at Brgy. Ungap, Sultan Kudarat, Maguindanao del Norte.

The Cotabato Sanitarium was established in 1936, initially to cater to people afflicted of leprosy. It was converted to a public hospital three decades later. It was formally made into a general hospital in 2022 via Republic Act No. 11715, adopting its current name with the government increasing its authorized bed capacity to 250.
