= Western Visayas Medical Center =

Government hospital in Iloilo City, Philippines

Geography
- Location: Mandurriao, Iloilo City, Iloilo, Western Visayas, Philippines
- Coordinates: 10°43′08″N 122°32′30″E

Organization
- Funding: Government hospital
- Type: tertiary level hospital

Services
- Beds: 700

Links
- Website: wvmc.doh.gov.ph

The Western Visayas Medical Center (WVMC) is a tertiary level government hospital in the Philippines with an authorized bed capacity of seven hundred (700). It is located along Q. Abeto Street, Mandurriao, Iloilo City, Iloilo.

== History ==
In June 1974, the Iloilo Provincial Hospital (IPH) was upgraded to a 200-bed capacity with the approval of 164 personnel. In 1982, under Batas Pambansa (BP) Bilang 640, IPH was reclassified as a regional hospital and renamed Western Visayas Regional Hospital, with plantilla personnel increased to 247. On April 27, 1984, through Batas Pambansa Blg. 825, the hospital was renamed Western Visayas Medical Center (WVMC). In April 1988, the Pototan Mental Health Unit in Brgy. Rumbang, Pototan, was aligned to WVMC.

On February 25, 1992, Republic Act 7198 increased WVMC's bed capacity to 425. On June 5, 1995, the Pototan Mental Health Unit was placed under the full supervision of WVMC. On November 2, 1997, Republic Act 8372 converted the Don Jose S. Monfort Memorial Hospital in Barotac Nuevo into a tertiary hospital, known as the Don Jose S. Monfort Medical Center Extension Hospital, under WVMC's supervision.

In 2005, Department of Health (DOH) Department Order No. 2005-0052 transferred the administration of the Pototan Treatment and Rehabilitation Center (now known as the Substance Abuse Treatment and Rehabilitation Center) to WVMC.

WVMC provides healthcare services to Western Visayas. It has 12 accredited departments, 118 medical specialists, 82 resident physicians, 345 nursing and paramedical staff, and 215 administrative staff. The hospital operates a one-stop Emergency Medical Services Complex and five satellite pharmacies.

WVMC is accredited in various specialties and subspecialties, including anesthesiology, cardiology, dermatology, neurology, oncology, obstetrics and gynecology, pediatrics, psychiatry, and surgery.
