= Divine Word Hospital =

Private hospital in Tacloban, Philippines

Divine Word Hospital Tacloban

Geography
- Location: Tacloban, Leyte, Eastern Visayas, Philippines
- Coordinates: 11°14′27″N 125°00′01″E

Organization
- Funding: Private
- Type: tertiary level hospital

Services
- Beds: 160

The Divine Word Hospital also known as Saint Arnold Medical Mission, Inc. is a DOH-accredited level 3 general hospital in Tacloban, Philippines. Formerly known as St. Pauls' Hospital, it is a private health facility managed by the Benedictine Sisters in the Philippines.
