= Southern Isabela Medical Center =

Government hospital in Isabela, Philippines

Geography
- Location: Santiago, Isabela, Cagayan Valley, Philippines
- Coordinates: 16°40′48″N 121°32′48″E

Organization
- Funding: Government hospital
- Type: tertiary level hospital

Services
- Beds: 350

Links
- Website: simc.doh.gov.ph

The Southern Isabela Medical Center (SIMC) is a tertiary level government hospital in the Philippines with an authorized bed capacity of three hundred fifty (350). It is located along Zamora Street, Santiago, Isabela.
