= Zamboanga Regional Medical Center =

Hospital in Zamboanga City, Philippines

Zamboanga Regional Medical Center (formerly Mindanao Central Sanitarium)

Geography
- Location: Zamboanga City, Zamboanga Peninsula, Philippines
- Coordinates: 6°58′00″N 122°07′58″E

Organization
- Type: National Government Office (NGO)

Services
- Beds: 200

History
- Founded: 1930

Links
- Website: mcs.doh.gov.ph

The Zamboanga Regional Medical Center (ZRMC), formerly known as the Mindanao Central Sanitarium, is a retained hospital under the Department of Health of the Republic of the Philippines. Established in 1930, it serves a dual function: as a sanitarium catering to Hansen’s Disease patients across Mindanao and as a general hospital serving Region IX.

In 2019, Republic Act No. 11325 was enacted, upgrading the Mindanao Central Sanitarium in Pasobolong, Zamboanga City, into a tertiary-level hospital. This legislation increased its authorized bed capacity for general care services from 50 to 200 beds and mandated the enhancement of its facilities, healthcare services, and human resources.

On January 3, 2025, Republic Act No. 12117 was enacted, officially renaming the Mindanao Central Sanitarium to the Zamboanga Regional Medical Center.

Today, ZRMC continues its commitment to providing comprehensive healthcare services to the people of Region IX and specialized care for Hansen’s Disease patients throughout Mindanao.
