= Conner District Hospital =

Government hospital in Apayao, Philippines

Geography
- Location: Conner, Apayao, Cordillera Administrative Region, Philippines
- Coordinates: 17°48′02″N 121°19′21″E

Organization
- Funding: Government hospital

Links
- Website: cdh.doh.gov.ph

The Conner District Hospital is a government hospital in the Philippines. It is located in Conner, Apayao.
