= Somoso General Hospital =

Private hospital in Davao del Norte, Philippines

SOMOSO General Hospital
- Location within Mindanao Location within Philippines

Geography
- Location: Quezon Blvd., Panabo City, Davao del Norte, Philippines
- Coordinates: 7°18′16″N 125°41′04″E

Organization
- Care system: Private
- Type: Level 2 Secondary Facility
- Affiliated university: NDC School of Nursing, University of San Carlos

Services
- Standards: Philippine Department of Health
- Emergency department: Yes
- Beds: 50 - 100

History
- Founded: 1975 by Dr. Cesar U. Somoso & Dr. Anita B. Somoso

Links
- Website: hospital.somosogroup.com

SOMOSO General Hospital is a privately owned, level 2 Secondary facility and multi-specialty hospital located in Panabo City, the Philippines. It was founded in 1975 as Clinica Somoso by doctors Caesar and Anita Somoso and grew from a family clinic into the first established hospital in Panabo City.

== History ==
In summer 1975, Doctors Caesar and Anita Somoso, a married couple, first established a 10-bed family clinic in a rented apartment. At the start the facility offered basic laboratory services (X-ray, blood examination, urinalysis, fecalysis) and primary health care. Six months after the establishment of Clinica Somoso, Philippines Social Security System recognized and accredited the clinic with Medicare privileges. This made Clinica Somoso the first lying-in hospital in Panabo community.

After one year of operation, Clinica Somoso increased its bed capacity to 25 because of high demands of medical services in the community and people recognized that they need not to go to Davao City or Tagum, Davao del Norte for their health needs and or confinements knowing they can be diagnosed and treated well in Clinica Somoso.

Two years after the 25 bed capacity was approved, Clinica Somoso applied for a secondary level licensure which was again approved by Department of Health / Medicare so again, the Clinica Somoso became the first secondary hospital in Panabo, Davao del Norte.

=== SOMOSO General Hospital ===
The name Clinica Somoso was changed to Somoso General Hospital on 1977. Gradually, but not progressively Somoso General Hospital under the new name continued to improve their hospital and decided to build their own facility. From across-were their old clinic was established, a 3-storey building was built. Later then Somoso General Hospital have increased to a 50-bed capacity hospital.

== Hospital departments ==
- Anesthesiology
- Family Medicine
- General Surgery
- Internal Medicine
- OB-Gyne
- Orthopedics
- Pediatrics
- Radiology
- Urology
- Out-Patient Department

== Accreditation ==
- Philippine Health Insurance Corporation (Phil-Health)
- AA International (AAI)
- Department of Health (Philippines)
- UnitedHealthcare
- Intellicare
- icare
