= Talavera General Hospital =

Government hospital in Nueva Ecija, Philippines

Geography
- Location: Talavera, Nueva Ecija, Central Luzon, Philippines
- Coordinates: 15°35′04″N 120°55′13″E

The Talavera General Hospital is a government hospital in the Philippines It is located in Talavera, Nueva Ecija.
