= Sulu Sanitarium and General Hospital =

Government hospital in Sulu, Philippines

Geography
- Location: Jolo, Sulu, Zamboanga Peninsula, Philippines
- Coordinates: 6°03′02″N 121°00′22″E

Organization
- Funding: Government hospital

The Sulu Sanitarium and General Hospital is a government hospital in the Philippines. It is located in Jolo, Sulu.
