= Siargao Island Medical Center =

Government hospital in Surigao del Norte, Philippines

Siargao Island Medical Center (SIMC)

Geography
- Location: Dapa, Surigao del Norte, Caraga, Philippines
- Coordinates: 9°45′31″N 126°03′26″E

Organization
- Funding: Government hospital
- Type: Government Hospital - level 2

Services
- Beds: 100

The Siargao Island Medical Center (SIMC) is a government hospital in the Philippines. It is located in Dapa, Surigao del Norte.
