= Tertiary referral hospital =

Hospital that provides tertiary care

A tertiary referral hospital (also called a tertiary hospital, tertiary referral center, tertiary care center, or tertiary center) is a large hospital that provides tertiary care, which is a level of health care obtained from specialists after referral from the providers of primary care and secondary care. Beyond that general definition, there is no precise narrower or more formal definition, but tertiary centers usually include the following:

- a major hospital that usually has a full complement of services including pediatrics, obstetrics, general medicine, gynecology, various branches of surgery and psychiatry or
- a specialty hospital dedicated to specific sub-specialty care (pediatric centers, oncology centers, psychiatric hospitals). Patients will often be referred from smaller hospitals to a tertiary hospital for major operations, consultations with sub-specialists and when sophisticated intensive care facilities are required.

Some examples of tertiary referral center care are:

- Head and neck oncology
- Perinatology (high-risk pregnancies)
- Neonatology (high-risk newborn care)
- PET scans
- Organ transplantation
- Trauma surgery
- High-dose chemotherapy for cancer cases
- Growth and puberty disorders
- Neurology and neurosurgery
- In the UK, cases of poisoning.

== See also ==
- History of hospitals
- Secondary hospital
- Medical specialty
- Hospital train
- Hospital ship
- Underground hospital
