= Jose Pujalte Jr. =

Filipino surgeon and public servant

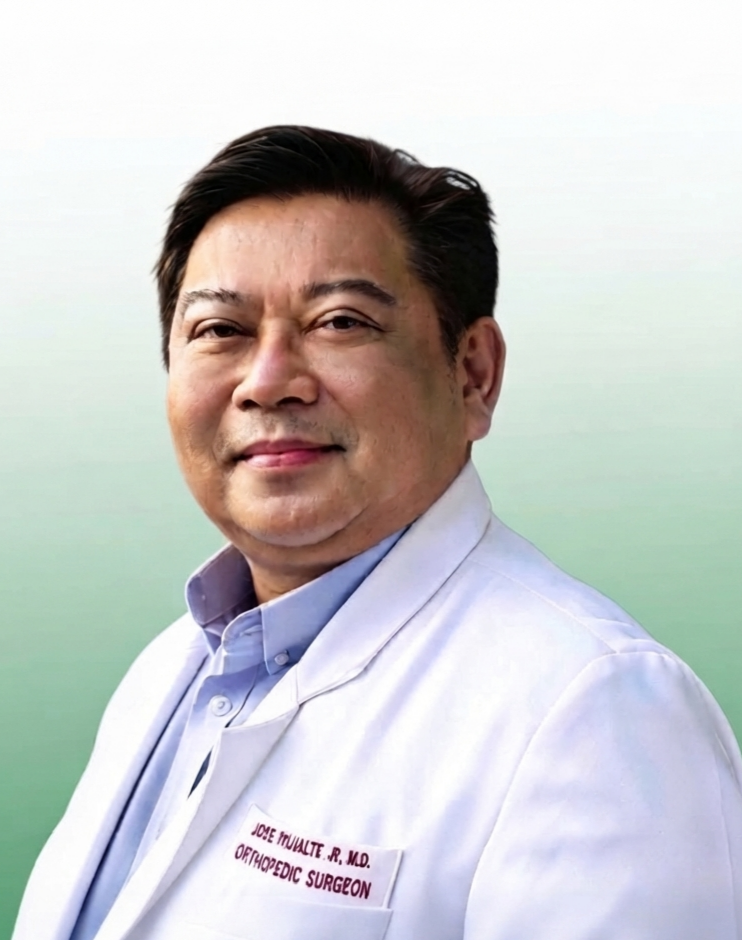

32nd Secretary of Health
- Ad interim
- In office July 13, 2026 – August 10, 2026
- President: Bongbong Marcos
- Preceded by: Ted Herbosa
- Succeeded by: Edwin Mercado

Personal details
- Born: Jose Brittanio S. Pujalte Jr.
- Children: 3
- Education: University of the Philippines Manila; Ateneo de Manila University
- Occupation: Orthopedic surgeon

Jose Brittanio "Brix" S. Pujalte Jr. is a Filipino orthopedic surgeon, hospital administrator, and educator who served as the secretary of the Department of Health of the Philippines on July 13, 2026 until his resignation on August 10, 2026 in the administration of President Bongbong Marcos.

== Education ==
Jose Pujalte attended both the University of the Philippines (UP) Diliman College of Arts and Letters and the UP Manila College of Medicine, graduating from the latter institution in 1990. He is also a master's degree holder in hospital administration (MHA), a credential he obtained from the Ateneo Graduate School of Business.

He finished his orthopedic residency at the Philippine Orthopedic Center in Quezon City in 1994 He was recognized as Career Executive Service Eligible in 2008.

Pujalte also trained under doctor Katsuya Nobuhara of Japan. In 1996, he specialized in total joint reconstruction under Ramon Gustilo at Hennepin County Medical Center in Minneapolis. In 1998, he also specialized in spine and joint replacement at Nuffield Orthopaedic Centre in the United Kingdom.

He is also a fellow of the Philippine Orthopedic Association, the Philippine College of Surgeons, and the American College of Surgeons.

== Career ==
Jose Pujalte Jr. joined the Department of Health in 1991 and worked as an orthopedic surgeon in public hospitals.

In 2014, Pujalte became Medical Center Chief II of the Philippine Orthopedic Center where he previously served as Chief of Clinics. He has also been president of the Philippine Orthopaedic Association (2009) and the ASEAN Orthopaedic Association (2010). He has founded the Philippine Shoulder Society and was a founding member of the Philippine Spine Society.

Pujalte also worked as a faculty member at the University of the Philippines Manila, Far Eastern University Nicanor Reyes Medical Foundation, and San Beda College of Medicine

=== Health secretary ===
On July 13, 2026, President Bongbong Marcos appointed Pujalte as secretary of the Department of Health. Pujalte succeeded Ted Herbosa who resigned from his position. He took oath before Marcos on July 14.

Pujalte's brief stint as health secretary was marred with purported controversies. On July 31, 2026, Pujalte was anonymously complained with the Presidential Complaint Center at Malacañang for allegedly gambling at the Okada Manila and Solaire Resort under the aliases "Louis Santos" and "Louiss Santos." He denied the allegations, claiming that he was visiting a hotel to meet with Masbate and Sorsogon officials to discuss providing help to public hospitals in the Bicol Region.

Additionally, on August 6, 2026, anonymous health advocates filed a graft complaint with the Ombudsman against him for delaying the procurement of tuberculosis medicines to allegedly to allow time for a favored supplier. Pujalte denied the claims, describing the complaint as a "demolition job" and stating that due diligence and a necessary review is needed since he had just assumed the position.

On August 10, 2026, the Marcos administration announced the appointment of PhilHealth President and CEO Edwin Mercado as new health secretary. It also conveyed that Pujalte has resigned from the position citing health reasons.

== Personal life ==
Pujalte has three daughters. His father was Jose Magallanes Pujalte, who was also a medical doctor and chief of the Philippine Orthopedic Center during the administration of Ferdinand Marcos Sr.

Political offices
Preceded by Ted Herbosa	Secretary of Health; 2026	Succeeded by Edwin Mercado
