= Ted Herbosa =

Filipino physician and government official (born 1959)

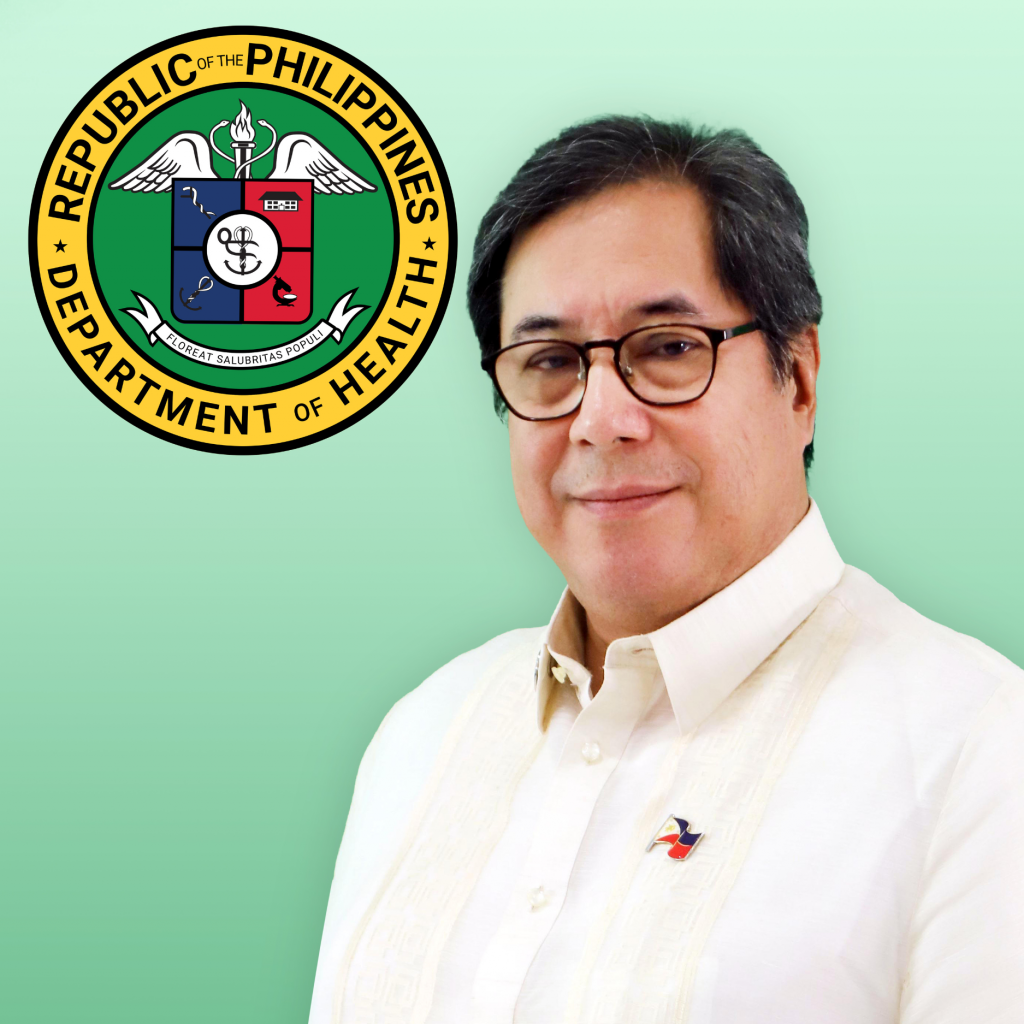
- Official DOH portrait

31st Secretary of Health
- In office June 5, 2023 – July 13, 2026
- President: Bongbong Marcos
- Preceded by: Maria Rosario Vergeire (OIC)
- Succeeded by: Jose Pujalte Jr. (Ad interim)

Personal details
- Born: Teodoro Javier Herbosa; May 6, 1959 (age 67)
- Spouse: Grace Ann Herbosa
- Education: University of the Philippines Diliman (BS); University of the Philippines Manila (M.D.)
- Occupation: Physician

Teodoro Javier Herbosa (born May 6, 1959) is a Filipino physician served as the secretary of health from 2023 until his resignation in 2026 in the administration of President Bongbong Marcos. He previously served as an undersecretary of the Department of Health, executive vice president of the University of the Philippines, and special adviser to the National Task Force Against COVID-19.

== Education ==
Herbosa graduated from University of the Philippines Diliman with a bachelor's degree in biology in 1979 and finished his studies in medicine at the University of the Philippines Manila by 1983. During his years at UP, he became a fellow of the Upsilon Sigma Phi. He would accomplish an international diploma course in emergency and crisis management from the University of Geneva in Switzerland and finished his post-graduate studies at the Sackler Faculty of Medicine of the Tel Aviv University in Israel.

== Career ==
=== Undersecretary of Health (2010–2015) ===
Herbosa was undersecretary at the Department of Health (DOH) from 2010 to 2015. He was involved in the formation of the Hospital Accreditation Commission, the modernization of the Philippine Orthopedic Center, as well as the promotion of public-private partnerships in the health sector of the Philippines.

=== National Task Force Against COVID-19 ===
Herbosa was a special adviser to the National Task Force Against COVID-19, a government body formed to respond to the COVID-19 pandemic in the Philippines during the administration of President Rodrigo Duterte.

He expressed anti-communist sentiments during his tenure. He would allege that the community pantries initiative which was launched as a response to the pandemic to be linked to the Communist rebellion. He was criticized for "death by community pantry" post in Twitter in reaction to a death of an old man lining up in a pantry in Quezon City for perceived apathy. He would clarify that he is not against the concept of community pantries as long as the safety of people is taken care of.

Herbosa in August 2021 would also receive criticism for another post honoring health workers on National Heroes' Day which specifically excluded those who opt to protest.

=== University of the Philippines (2017–2021) ===
Herbosa was executive vice president of the University of the Philippines System during the administration of UP President Danilo Concepcion. He served the role from October 2017 to April 2021. He resigned from the post in April 2021 for "personal reasons" after receiving intense criticism over a controversial remark on community pantries.

=== Secretary of Health (2023–2026) ===
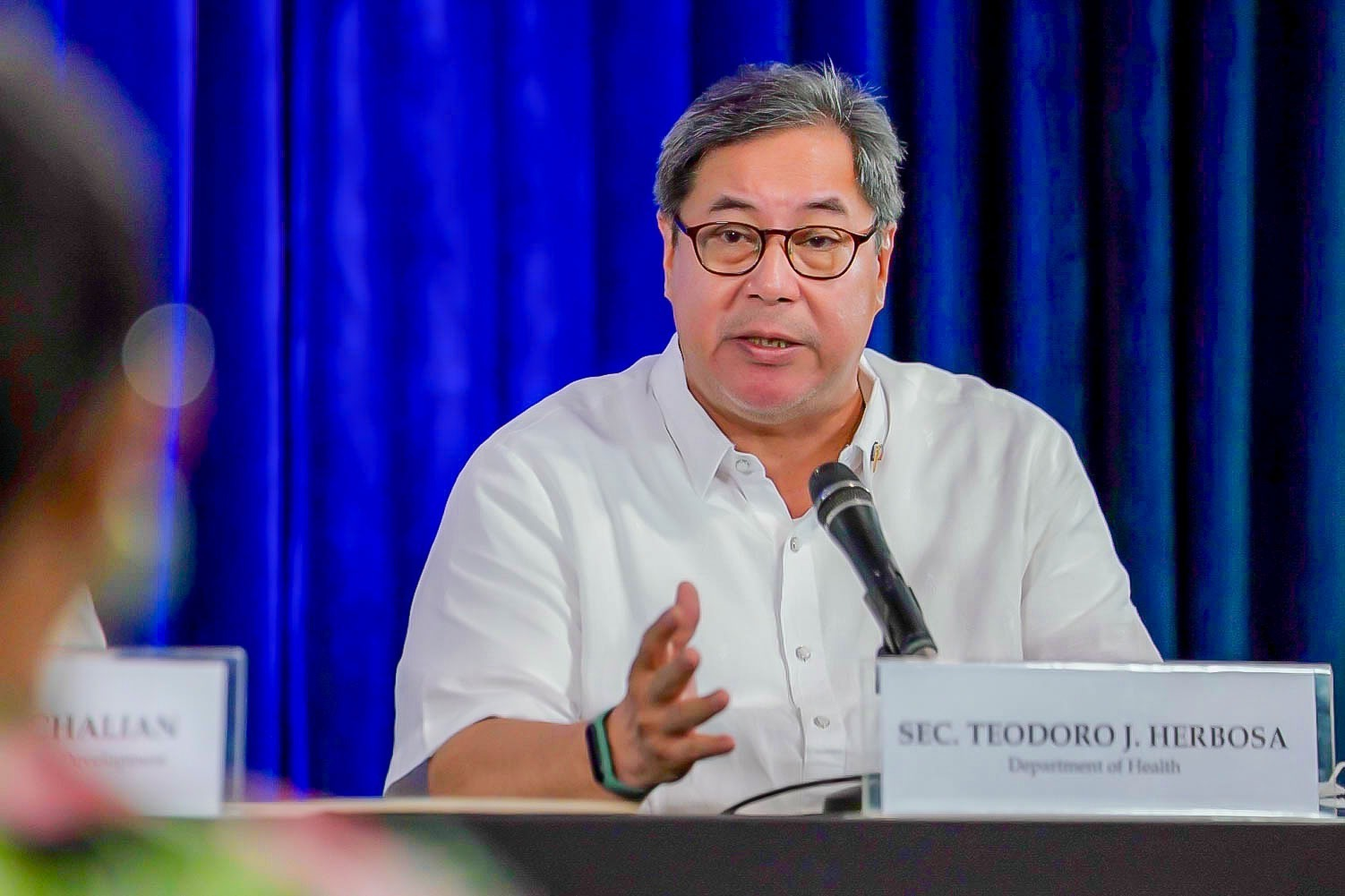
Herbosa taking questions with the Press during the press briefing on Malacañan Palace, June 13, 2023.

Herbosa would be appointed secretary of health by Philippine President Bongbong Marcos on June 5, 2023, and took oath the following day.

Herbosa's appointment was backed by the Philippine Medical Association, with whom he is a "life member", which endorsed him as secretary back in June 2022. He was also supported by the Philippine College of Physicians shortly after his appointment in 2023. The Alliance of Health Workers meanwhile opposed his appointment on part of his support for privatization of government hospitals during his tenure as undersecretary which is in opposition to the group's advocacy of "free and quality health services" in public health institutions.

He would apologize for what he "said before" which the media linked to his prior statements regarding community pantries and health worker protests.

Representing the Philippines, Herbosa was elected president of the 78th session of the World Health Assembly (WHA78) in May 2025. It was the first time for the Philippines to take on that role.

Herbosa resigned as Health Secretary on July 13, 2026, following a bilateral knee replacement six days earlier. He had been on sick leave since July 6 and is undergoing rehabilitation for three to four months.

== Personal life ==
He is married to physician Grace Ann Banson.

He is also a descendant of Lucia Rizal Mercado, the sister of José Rizal, widely considered to be the Philippines' national hero, as well as a great-grandnephew of Delfina Herbosa de Natividad, one of the three women who sewed the first Philippine flag.

Political offices
| Preceded by Maria Rosario Vergeire (Officer in Charge) | Secretary of Health; 2023–2026 | Succeeded by Jose Pujalte Jr. |
