= Francisco Duque III =

Filipino government official and physician (born 1957)

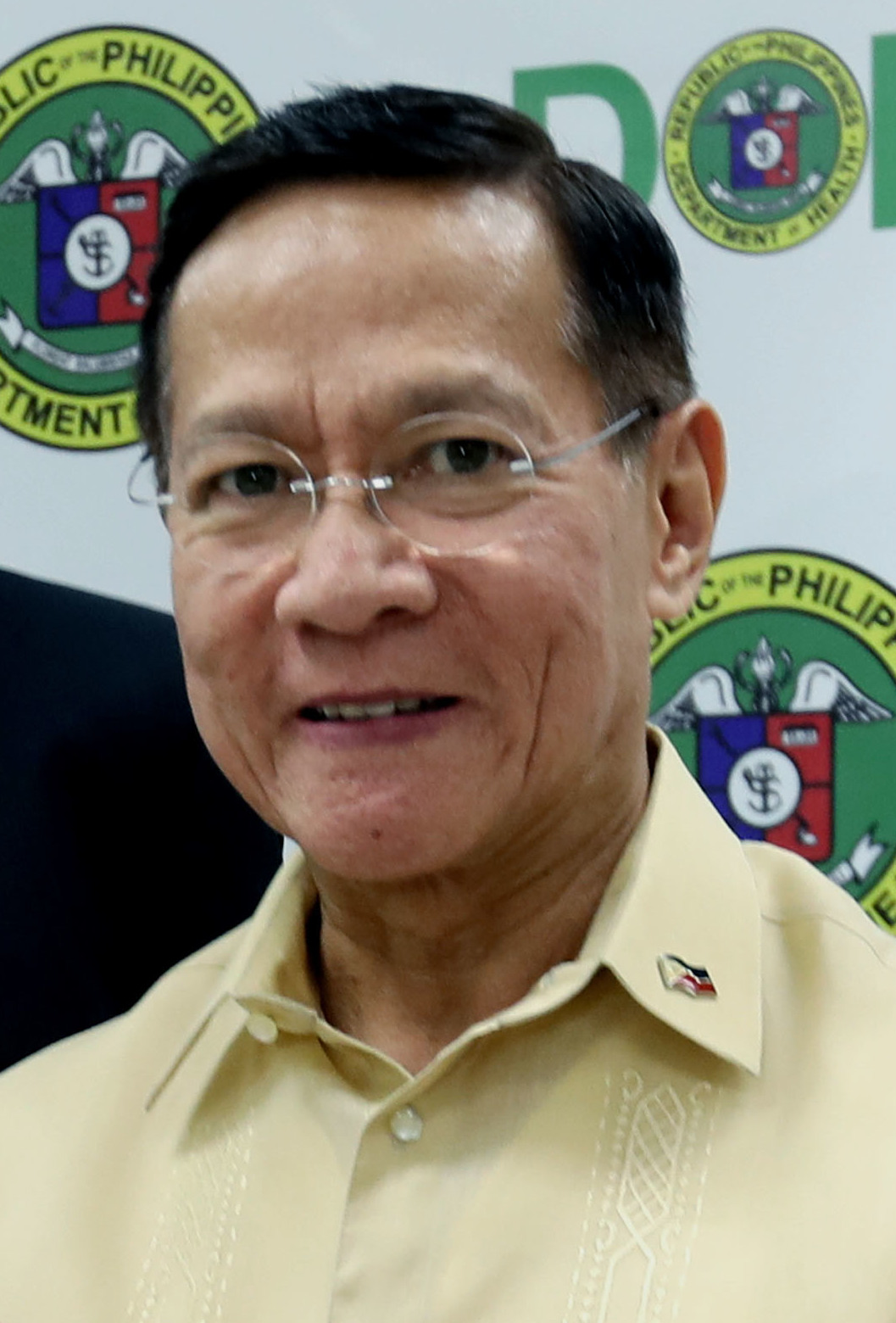
- Duque in 2018

27th Secretary of Health
- In office October 26, 2017 – June 30, 2022
- President: Rodrigo Duterte
- Preceded by: Herminigildo Valle (OIC)
- Succeeded by: Maria Rosario Vergeire (OIC)
- In office June 1, 2005 – September 1, 2009
- President: Gloria Macapagal Arroyo
- Preceded by: Manuel Dayrit
- Succeeded by: Esperanza Cabral

Chairman of the Civil Service Commission
- In office February 2, 2010 – February 2, 2015
- President: Gloria Macapagal Arroyo; Benigno S. Aquino III
- Preceded by: Ricardo Saludo
- Succeeded by: Alicia de la Rosa Bala

Personal details
- Born: Francisco Tiongson Duque III; February 13, 1957 (age 69) Manila, Philippines
- Relations: Francisco Q. Duque Jr. (father); Cesar T. Duque (brother)
- Education: University of Santo Tomas (BS, MD); Georgetown University (MS)
- Occupation: Physician, health secretary

Francisco Tiongson Duque III (Tagalog: [fɾɐnˈsisko ˈdukɛ]; born February 13, 1957) is a Filipino physician and government official who served as Secretary of Health in the Cabinet of President Rodrigo Duterte from 2017 to 2022, a position he had previously held from 2005 to 2009 in the Cabinet of President Gloria Macapagal Arroyo. From 2010 to 2015, he served as the chair of the Civil Service Commission.

== Early life and education ==
Duque earned his high school diploma from Lourdes School of Quezon City in 1974 and his bachelor's degree in zoology from the University of Santo Tomas (UST) in 1978. He then obtained his Doctor of Medicine degree from the UST Faculty of Medicine and Surgery in 1982. Duque continued his education in the United States, where he earned his Master of Science degree in pathology from Georgetown University in 1987. It was at Georgetown where he underwent scientific training in women's health from 1985 to 1988. In 1992, Duque finished a post-graduate course on executive education Harvard School of Public Health.

== Early career ==
From 1989 to 1995, Duque served as the Dean of the College of Medicine of Lyceum-Northwestern University. He also was Director of the University of Pangasinan at the same time (1989–1999). Duque then became the Administrator of the Lyceum-Northwestern University General Hospital the following year and became its Executive Vice-president the same time. He eventually stepped down from those positions in 2000.

== Government career ==
=== PhilHealth President (2001–2005) ===
In June 2001, President Gloria Macapagal-Arroyo appointed Duque as President & CEO of the Philippine Health Insurance Corporation (PhilHealth). As President of PhilHealth, he initiated and directed PhilHealth's Plan 500/GMA Indigent Program which fast tracked the enrollment of 500,000 urban poor beneficiaries into the National Health Insurance Plan (NHIP) in one year. By 2003, indigent enrollment from the NHIP initiative totaled 8 million beneficiaries. President Arroyo presented PhilHealth as a showcase of her administration's successes through the successful enrollment of 5.9 million families or 29,901,890 beneficiaries in the NHIP by 2004.

=== First stint as Secretary of Health (2005–2009) ===
On June 1, 2005, President Arroyo appointed Duque as secretary of the Department of Health because of his efficient leadership at the helm of PhilHealth. As DOH Secretary, the agency achieved many impressive breakthroughs and milestones regarding public health care that helped DOH earn high approval ratings. During his tenure, the World Health Organization (WHO) cited the Philippines for being one of only three nations that had excellent risk communication strategies against the deadly AH1N1 virus. His five-year stewardship of the DOH was also marked by quick and stable response efforts against various health emergencies and disasters such as the Guimaras oil spill (2005), the Leyte Guinsaugon landslide (2006), St. Andrew's School mercury spill (2006), melamine-laced milk products (2008), Typhoon Ondoy (2009) and the Ebola Reston in pigs (2009). Duque also served concurrently as the Anti-Hunger Czar via his role as Chair of the National Nutrition Council (NNC), tasked by the President to oversee the implementation of the hunger mitigation programs of 27 government agencies. He was also appointed Presidential Oversight Chair of the Philippine Charity Sweepstakes Office (PCSO).

=== Chairman of the Civil Service Commission (2010–2015) ===
On January 11, 2010, Duque was appointed as the Chairman of the Civil Service Commission (CSC). By March 9, 2010, Chairman Duque was named vice-chairman of the Career Executive Service Board (CESB). During his time as CSC Chairman, Duque was pivotal in developing the CSC Roadmap for Development and Reforms for 2010–15, a five-year blueprint that details the priority programs of CSC for the country's 1.4 million civil servants. Duque's other landmark programs included the Strategic Performance Management System (SPMS), Botika Para sa Taumbayan, Contact Center ng Bayan, and the CSC Computerized Examination System or COMEX.

Under Duque's Chairmanship, the CSC was conferred the "Governance Trailblazer Seal" after it achieved the highest compliance rating of 9.03 at the Performance Governance System (PGS) Revalida on October 14, 2011. Under his chairmanship, the CSC got the highest rating, with 98 percent of clients saying they were satisfied with the services they received from the CSC based on a Pulse Asia survey which covered the period October 24 to November 17, 2011.

=== GSIS President and second stint as Secretary of Health (2017–2022) ===
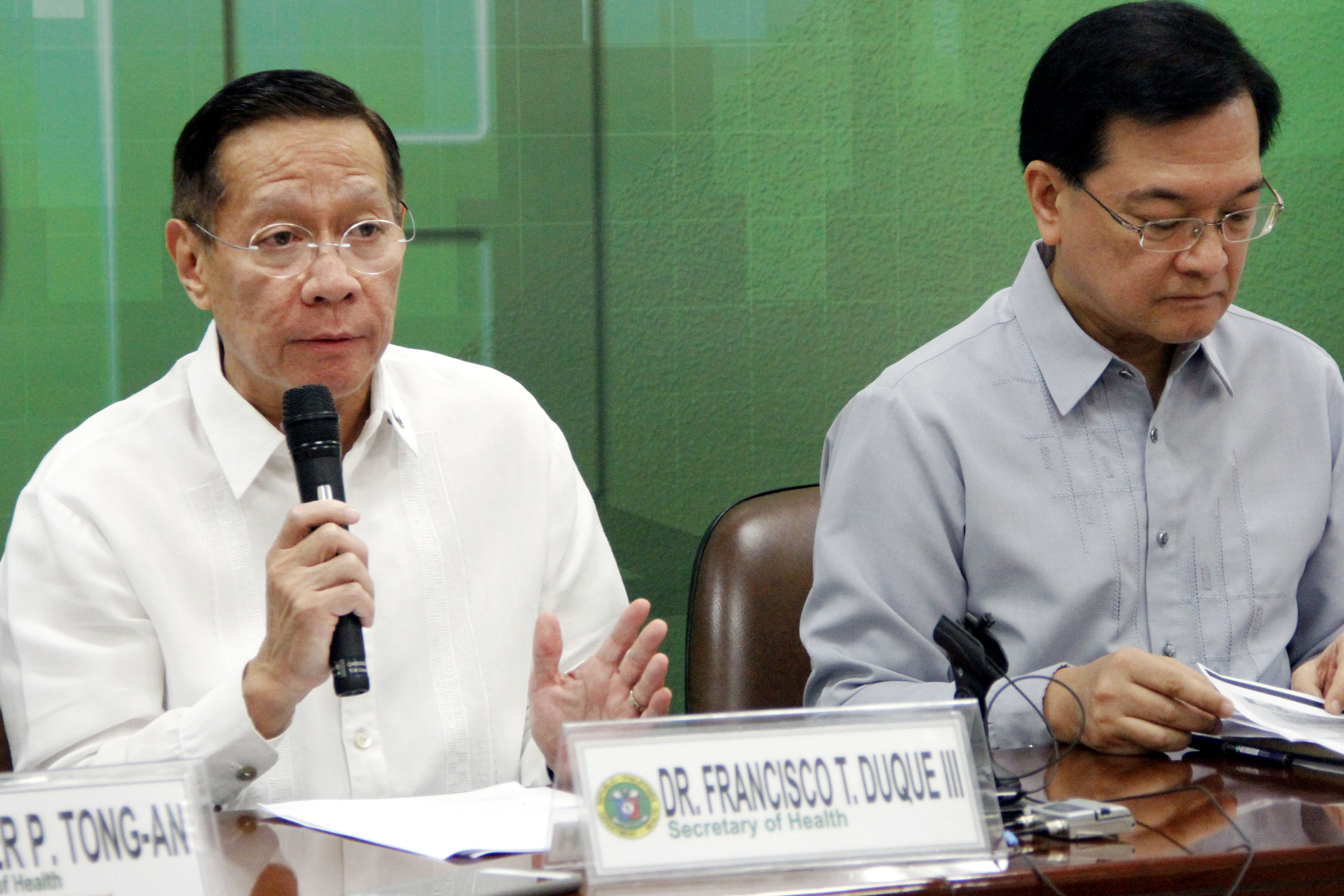
Duque III (left) during a DOH Universal Health Care agenda press briefing in Manila in November 2017

Duque was appointed Chairman of the Government Service Insurance System (GSIS) by President Rodrigo Duterte in 2017. As chairman, he began laying the groundwork for various reforms to strengthen the government corporation. However, barely one year after his appointment to GSIS, President Duterte appointed Duque as DOH Secretary once more. Upon his assumption of office as DOH Secretary on November 6, 2017, he became the first returning health chief of the agency since the reappointment of Health Secretary Paulino Garcia in the 1960s.

Duque, as Health Secretary, has led reforms in improving the information technology system of PhilHealth to safeguard against fraudulent claims and other forms of cybercrime. Duque has also been an outspoken champion for raising vaccination rates among children and youth to combat highly contagious diseases such as polio and measles. He has urged parents, health workers, and local governments to fully participate in the synchronized polio vaccination in order to stop the disease.

Duque moved for the historic passage of two major pieces of legislation – the Universally Accessible, Affordable Quality Medicine Act of 2008 and the Food and Drug Administration Law of 2009.

==== Conflict of interest allegations ====
On July 29, 2019, in his privilege speech, Senator Panfilo Lacson accused Duque of an alleged conflict of interest as secretary of the Department of Health. Lacson claimed that the companies of Duque's siblings, Doctors' Pharmaceutical (DPI) and Educational and Medical Development Corporation (EMDC), continued to have contracts with government agencies despite Duque taking positions in government. According to Lacson, DPI continued to earn millions of pesos from the government through the lease of an EMDC building for the use of the Philippine Health Corporation Regional Office 1 in Dagupan City.

During a hearing of the Senate Blue Ribbon Committee on August 14, 2019, Duque denied any conflict of interest in his part. Duque said that when he acquired shares in DPI in 1996, the company already had partnerships with the government. He also said he had already divested all personal interests with DPI in 2005 and, as such, there can be no conflict of interest under RA 6713. Lacson said the DPI signed government contracts in 2005, the year Duque was confirmed as health secretary.

In EMDC's case, Duque reiterated that the lease of the EMDC property was advantageous to the government because it allowed the Philhealth Region I Office to move out of a building that was declared a fire hazard. Also, the lease went to the proper procurement process and the directive of leasing office space is managed by the Regional Vice President of PhilHealth, and not the Board in which he was an ex-officio member. Duque also informed then PhilHealth CEO Alex Padilla in 2013 about his shares and was not ordered to divest, thus implying that there was no conflict of interest.

==== Handling of COVID-19 response in the Philippines ====
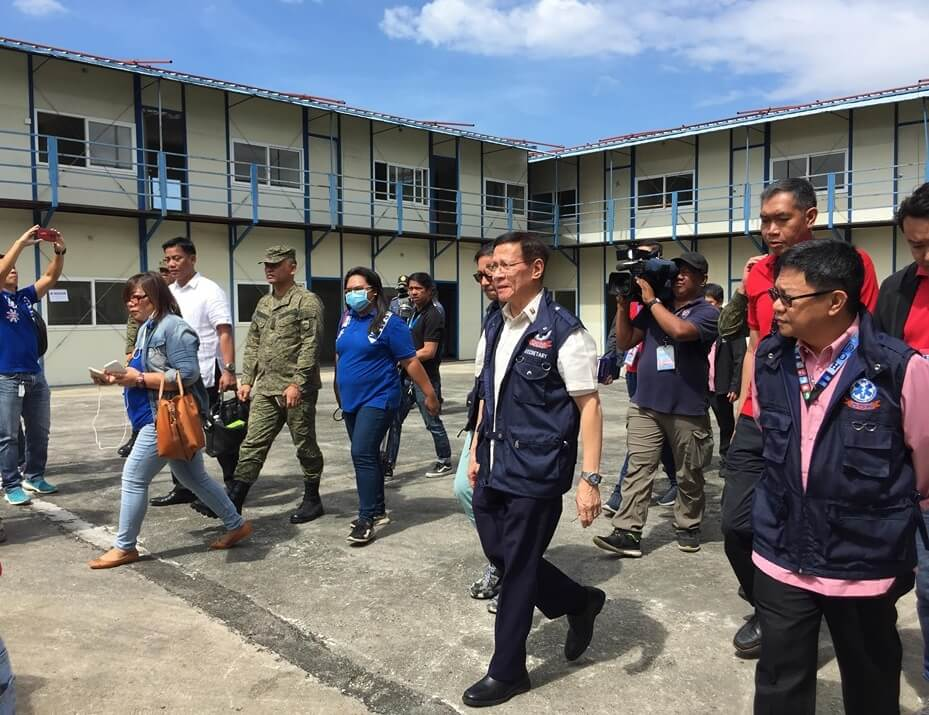
Duque III inspects the Mega DATRC for 2019-nCov repatriation.

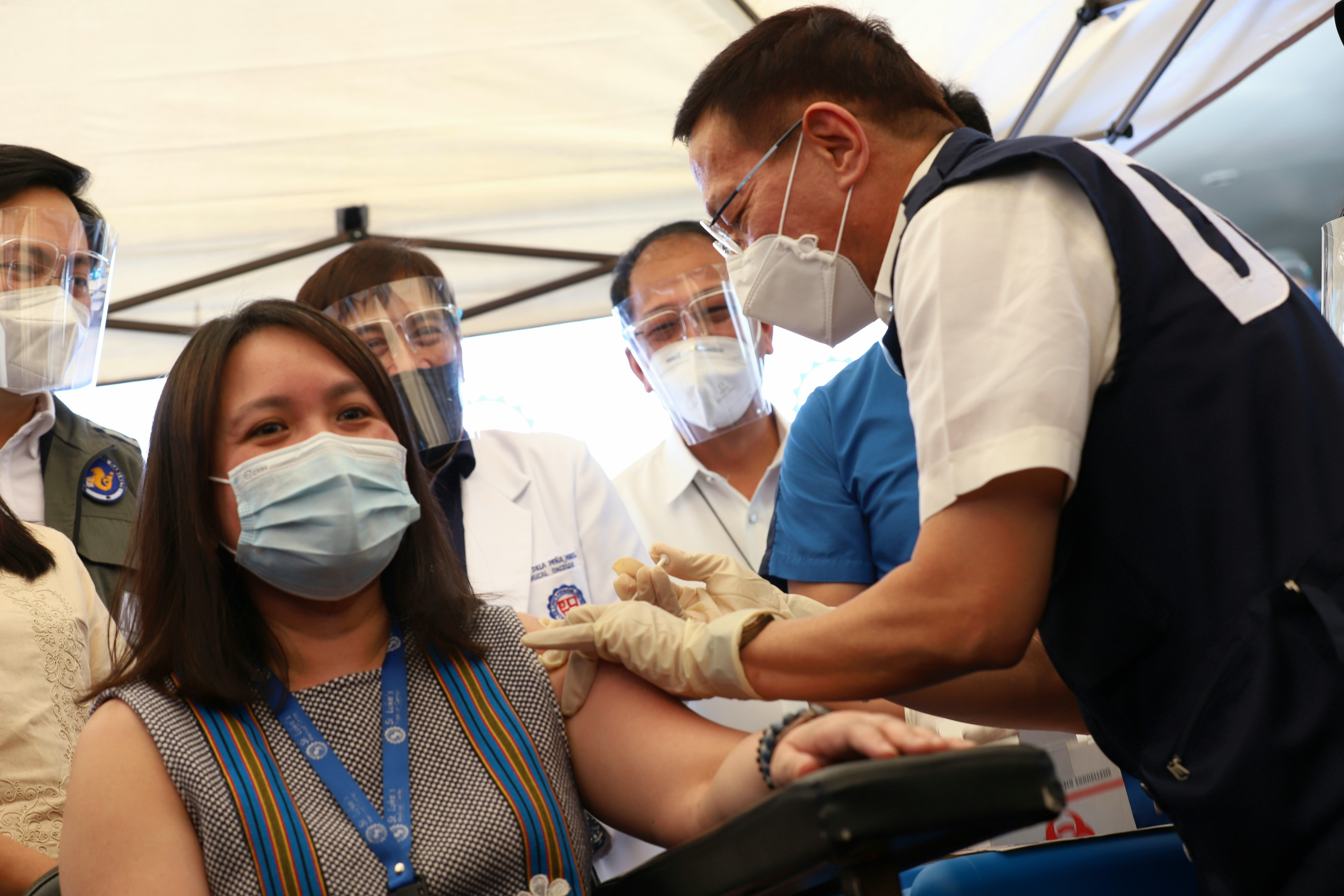
Duque III administers the CoronaVac vaccine to Dr. Deborah Ignacia Ona in March 2021.

Duque was at the helm of the Department of Health during the COVID-19 pandemic. Before the outbreak in the Philippines, while cases were surging in China, Duque told the House of Representatives that while a temporary ban on Chinese tourists has been among the options studied by the government, there may be serious "political and diplomatic repercussions" with such a move. As local transmissions increased and with limited testing capacity, he was criticized for justifying preferential treatment for VIPs and government officials, in violation of his agency's own COVID-19 testing protocols.

In a press briefing held on April 9, 2020, Duque noted that the number of confirmed COVID-19 cases in the Philippines is "relatively low" compared to other countries, despite limited testing and running contrary to earlier statements released by the Department of Health. His special assistant, Beverly Ho, earlier said in a virtual press briefing that the impact of the ECQ would only be learned by mid-April as it was too early to tell whether it had a role in curbing the spread of the coronavirus. Health Undersecretary Maria Rosario Vergeire also said that, before the "true picture" of the COVID-19 pandemic could be determined, the testing capacity of the country must first stabilize—meaning it must be able to conduct 8,000 to 10,000 COVID-19 tests a day.

On April 16, 2020, 15 senators filed Senate Resolution No. 362 calling for Duque's immediate resignation for his "failure of leadership, negligence, lack of foresight, and inefficiency in the performance of his mandate as the secretary of the Department of Health."

On June 5, 2020, Duque blamed the people of his own agency, the Department of Health, over unreleased financial compensation for health workers who died of COVID-19.

On July 31, 2020, Duque reported 38,075 recoveries in a day as an adjustment to include mild and or asymptomatic cases. Following the announcement, the keywords "mass recovery" became a trending topic on Twitter, with over 7,400 tweets as of posting time, with the majority of the posts denouncing the government for allegedly trying to deceive the public. Sorsogon governor and former senator Francis Escudero stated that the change is "only in the Philippines" and is "intolerable and insulting." Escudero also asked President Rodrigo Duterte to fire Duque.

On August 16, 2021, the health secretary accused the Commission on Audit (COA) of destroying the good image of the Department of Health with the latter's release of an audit report detailing serious adverse findings in the disbursement by DOH of the P67.32 billion worth of COVID-19 funds.

On September 1, 2021, Duque was tagged by a former PhilHealth anti-fraud officer as the "godfather" of the so-called "mafia" during a senate investigation on billion of pesos of Philhealth funds allegedly lost to corruption.

==== Pharmally scandal case ====
On May 10, 2024, the Ombudsman ordered the filing of Information against Duque III and Department of Budget and Management Procurement Service (PS) head, Lloyd Christopher Lao for violation of section 3(e), Republic Act 3019, the "Anti-Graft and Corrupt Practices Act" on their participation in the Pharmally scandal. It ruled on their irregular transfer of P41 billion of the Department of Health to PS-DBM for the procurement of COVID-19 supplies. The 49-page judgment also ordered them "dismissed them from service, with forfeiture of all their retirement benefits and perpetual disqualification from reentering government." On September 30, Duque filed with the Sandiganbayan a Motion to quash the graft charges. In October 2024, the Ombudsman dismissed the administrative charges against Duque III over Pharmally deals for mootness.

== Awards and recognition ==
- Most Outstanding Rotary President District 3790 (1993)
- Outstanding Thomasian Alumnus Leadership (TOTAL) Award in the Field of Government Service (2004)
- Albertus Magnus Science Award by the UST College of Science for his achievements in Medical Science, Public Health and Stewardship of the National Health Insurance Program (2007)

Political offices
Preceded by Manuel Dayrit	Secretary of Health; 2005–2009	Succeeded by Esperanza Cabral
Preceded by Paulyn Ubial	Secretary of Health; 2017–2022	Succeeded by Maria Rosario Vergeire (OIC)
