= Paulyn Ubial =

Filipino physician

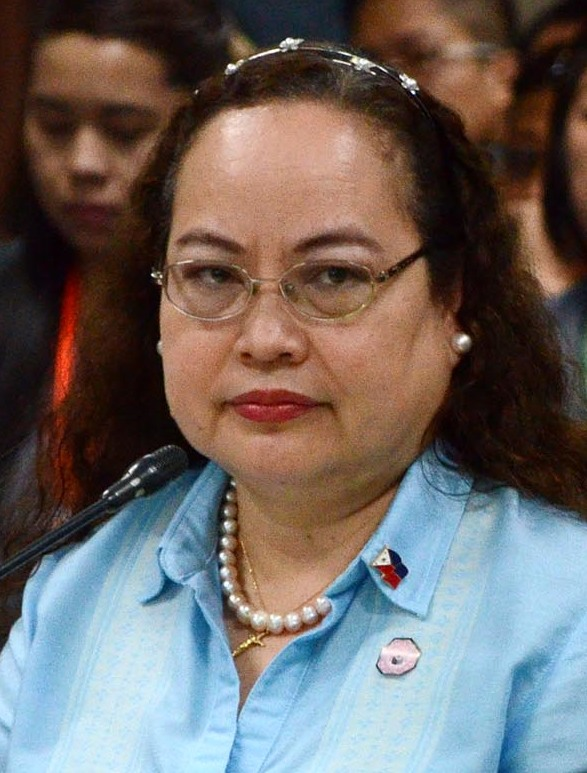
- Ubial in 2017

Secretary of Health
- Ad interim
- In office June 30, 2016 – October 10, 2017
- President: Rodrigo Duterte
- Preceded by: Janette Garin
- Succeeded by: Herminigildo Valle (OIC)

Assistant Secretary of the Department of Health
- In office April 29, 2008 – June 30, 2016
- President: Gloria Macapagal Arroyo; Benigno Aquino III
- Secretary: Francisco Duque III; Esperanza Cabral; Enrique Ona; Janette Garin

Personal details
- Born: Paulyn Jean Buenaflor Rosell; June 29, 1962 (age 63) Iloilo City, Philippines
- Spouse: Edwin F. Ubial
- Children: 1
- Education: University of the Philippines Integrated School
- Alma mater: University of the Philippines Diliman (BS); University of the East (MD); University of the Philippines Manila (M.P.H.)
- Occupation: Civil servant
- Profession: Physician

Paulyn Jean Buenaflor Rosell-Ubial (born June 29, 1962) is a Filipino physician who served as Secretary of Health on an ad interim basis under the Duterte administration. President Rodrigo Duterte nominated her in 2016, but the Commission on Appointments rejected her appointment in 2017.

She spent her entire career in public health and was an assistant secretary of the Department of Health from 2008 to 2016.

== Early life ==
Paulyn Jean Buenaflor Rosell was born on June 29, 1962, in Iloilo City. Her father, Neon Rosell, was a zoology professor at the University of the Philippines Diliman (UP Diliman), while her mother was Maria Buenaflor. For elementary and high school, she attended the University of the Philippines Integrated School in Diliman. She then earned her Bachelor of Science degree in zoology from UP Diliman in 1983, and her Doctor of Medicine degree from the University of the East in 1987. She completed her internship at the Philippine General Hospital.

Her family owns a farm in M'lang, Cotabato. Her relatives, Rodolfo Buenaflor and Luigi Cuerpo, had served as mayors of the town.

== Career ==
=== Department of Health ===
Ubial began her career as a volunteer rural physician in Kidapawan, Cotabato in 1988. The following year, she became a medical specialist for the Department of Health (DOH) and was assigned to Cotabato City. In 1990, she eventually became the assistant city health officer of Cotabato City. She was then assigned to the DOH headquarters in Manila in 1991, where she headed the Polio Eradication Unit. She also worked for other programs of the DOH, including the Communicable Disease Control Service and various women's health programs. From 2001 to 2005, she was the assistant regional director of the Western Visayas Center for Health Development, and was later promoted to regional director of Davao Center for Health Development, serving from 2006 to 2008. In Davao City, she became acquainted with then-mayor Rodrigo Duterte.

From 2008 to June 2016, she was an Assistant Secretary of the DOH.

During her stint in Manila, she earned her Master of Public Health degree from UP Manila.

=== Secretary of Health ===
After Duterte won the 2016 presidential election, Ubial was named as the incoming Secretary of Health.

She is an anti-tobacco advocate. She helped author Executive Order 26, which bans smoking in enclosed public places and transportation servicing the general population, except in designated smoking areas.

The Commission on Appointments (CA) did not approve of Ubial's appointment as Health Secretary on October 10, 2017, ending her de facto tenure. Kabayan Representative Harry Roque, lawyer Restituto Mendoza, and Potenciano Malvar, medical director of the General Miguel M. Malvar Medical Foundation officially filed opposition to her appointment. Her dealings with PhilHealth was contentious, which led 150 of the organization's employees to oppose her appointment, citing her decision to suspend the allowances and salary adjustments of Philhealth's employees which caused "extreme demoralization". Former CEO and President of PhilHealth Hildegardes Dineros disputed the nature of his departure from Philhealth. He claimed that he was forcibly removed from his post by Ubial and did not voluntary resign as she claimed.

=== Later career ===
As of October 2020, Ubial is the head of the Philippine Red Cross biomolecular laboratories.

Political offices
Preceded by Janette Garin	Secretary of Health; 2016–2017	Succeeded by Francisco Duque
