= Edwin Mercado =

Filipino physician and CEO

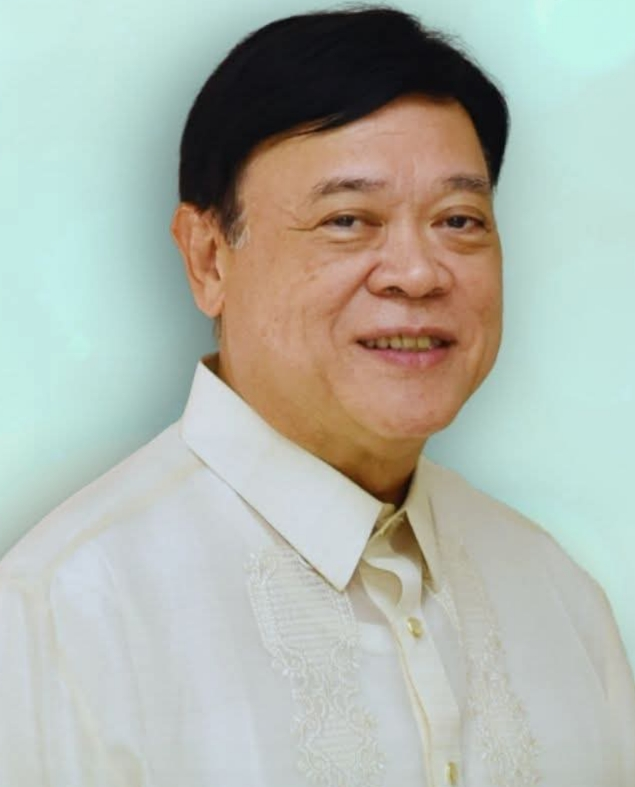
- Mercado in 2026

33rd Secretary of Health
- Ad Interim
- Assumed office August 10, 2026
- President: Bongbong Marcos
- Preceded by: Jose Pujalte Jr.

President and CEO of Philippine Health Insurance Corporation
- In office February 4, 2025 – August 10, 2026
- Preceded by: Emmanuel Ledesma Jr.
- Succeeded by: Beverley Lorraine Ho

Personal details
- Born: Edwin M. Mercado
- Education: University of the Philippines College of Medicine (BS); University of North Carolina at Chapel Hill (MS); Harvard Medical School (MMS)
- Occupation: Government Official

Edwin M. Mercado, is a Filipino physician who has served as secretary of health of the Philippines since 2026.

He previously served as President & CEO of Philippine Health Insurance Corporation from February 2025 until his appointment by President Bongbong Marcos as secretary of the Department of Health in August 2026.

== Education ==
Mercado earned his Bachelor of Science degree in Zoology in 1983 and his Doctor of Medicine degree in 1987, both from the University of the Philippines College of Medicine. He had his orthopedic training at Philippine General Hospital. He received an executive master’s degree in Healthcare Administration from University of North Carolina at Chapel Hill in 2020 and completed his Master of Medical Science degree from Harvard Medical School in 2023.

== Career ==
Mercado has collaborated with the Zuellig Family Foundation and the Department of Health’s Centers for Health Development, providing technical assistance to Provincial Health Boards in implementing Healthcare Provider Networks (HCPN).

Since March 2021, Edwin Mercado has served as the vice chairman of Mercado General Hospital/Qualimed Health Network.

From August 2022 to June 2023, Mercado served as a consultant for the Department of Health, providing guidance on the implementation of Universal Health Care (UHC).

Since July 2023, Mercado has been a fellow under Dr. Chunling Lu at Brigham and Women’s Hospital and Harvard Medical School’s Department of Social Medicine and Global Health. His research focuses on analyzing the cost of per-member payments for global inpatient service coverage and studying the application of Artificial Intelligence (AI) to assist community health workers in delivering primary care.

In addition to his administrative and advocacy roles, Mercado is involved in academia. He is a faculty lecturer at the Ateneo School of Medicine and Public Health (ASMPH). He also serves as a guest lecturer at the University of the Philippines College of Public Health, focusing on medical processes and programs.

On February 4, 2025, Mercado was appointed as the President and Chief Executive Officer (CEO) of the Philippine Health Insurance Corporation (PhilHealth) by President Bongbong Marcos.

=== Health secretary ===
On August 10, 2026, President Bongbong Marcos appointed Mercado as secretary of the Department of Health following the resignation of Jose Pujalte Jr.. His predecessor resigned for health reasons and was face allegations of graft for delaying the procurement of tuberculosis medicine for a favored supplier.

Political offices
Preceded by Emmanuel Ledesma Jr.	President and CEO of Philippine Health Insurance Corporation; 2026–present	Succeeded by Beverley Lorraine Ho
Preceded by Jose Pujalte Jr.	Secretary of Health; 2026–present	Incumbent
Order of precedence
Preceded by Gilbert Teodoro as Secretary of National Defense	Order of Precedence of the Philippines as Secretary of Health	Succeeded by Maria Cristina Aldeguer-Roque as Secretary of Trade and Industry
