= Zuellig Family Foundation =

Filipino public health nonprofit

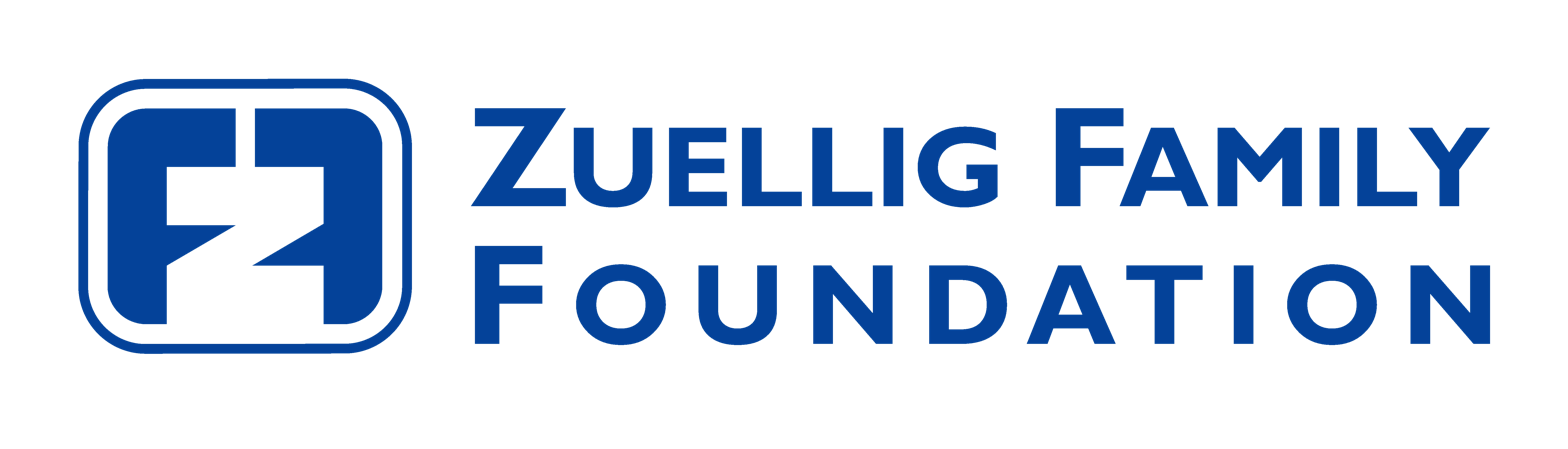
- Logo of the organization
- Formation: 2008
- Type: Non-governmental organization
- Region served: Philippines
- President and Executive Director: Austere Panadero
- Website: zuelligfoundation.com

The Zuellig Family Foundation (ZFF) is a Philippine nonprofit organization that works to improve health outcomes in poor and underserved communities, mainly through health leadership and governance training for local government leaders. It was established in 1997 as the Pharmaceutical Health and Family Foundation and was renamed to Zuellig Family Foundation in 2008. The foundation is rooted in the Zuellig family’s long history in healthcare in Asia.

== Background ==
ZFF was formally renamed in 2008 to reflect the Zuellig family's growing focus on health-centered philanthropy. Roberto Romulo, then chairman, invited former Agrarian Reform Secretary Ernesto Garilao to serve as ZFF’s founding president. Former Interior and Local Government Undersecretary Austere Panadero, who joined in 2018 as executive director, was appointed president in 2023. Former Secretary of Health Manuel Dayrit currently serves as the chairman of the Foundation.

The foundation receives financial support from the Zuellig family, contributing about PHP 150 million annually during its early years, averaging $2.3 million per year in recent years.

== Programs ==
ZFF is known for its Health Leadership and Governance Program, which focuses on training local leaders to become effective stewards of health in their communities. This is part of what ZFF calls its Health Change Model, which emphasises the importance of local leadership in addressing health system gaps.

Its approach attempts to encourage collaboration between different parts of the local health system, including provincial hospitals, municipal health officers, and barangay health workers. The foundation also partners with academic institutions to deliver its training programs.

The foundation’s initial focus was on reducing maternal deaths, aligning with the Millennium Development Goals (MDGs). From 2008 to 2013, ZFF reported dramatic improvements in maternal and child health outcomes, in which the maternal mortality ratio (MMR) of municipalities in the first training cohort fell from 167 to 42, the second cohort from 193 to 55 and the third from 141 to 41.

== Recognition ==
In 2017, Forbes Asia recognized ZFF as one of its "Heroes of Philanthropy", citing its work in improving health services in rural areas and its impact on maternal and child mortality.
