= Secretary of Health (Philippines) =

Member of the Cabinet of the Philippines

- Kalihim ng Kalusugan
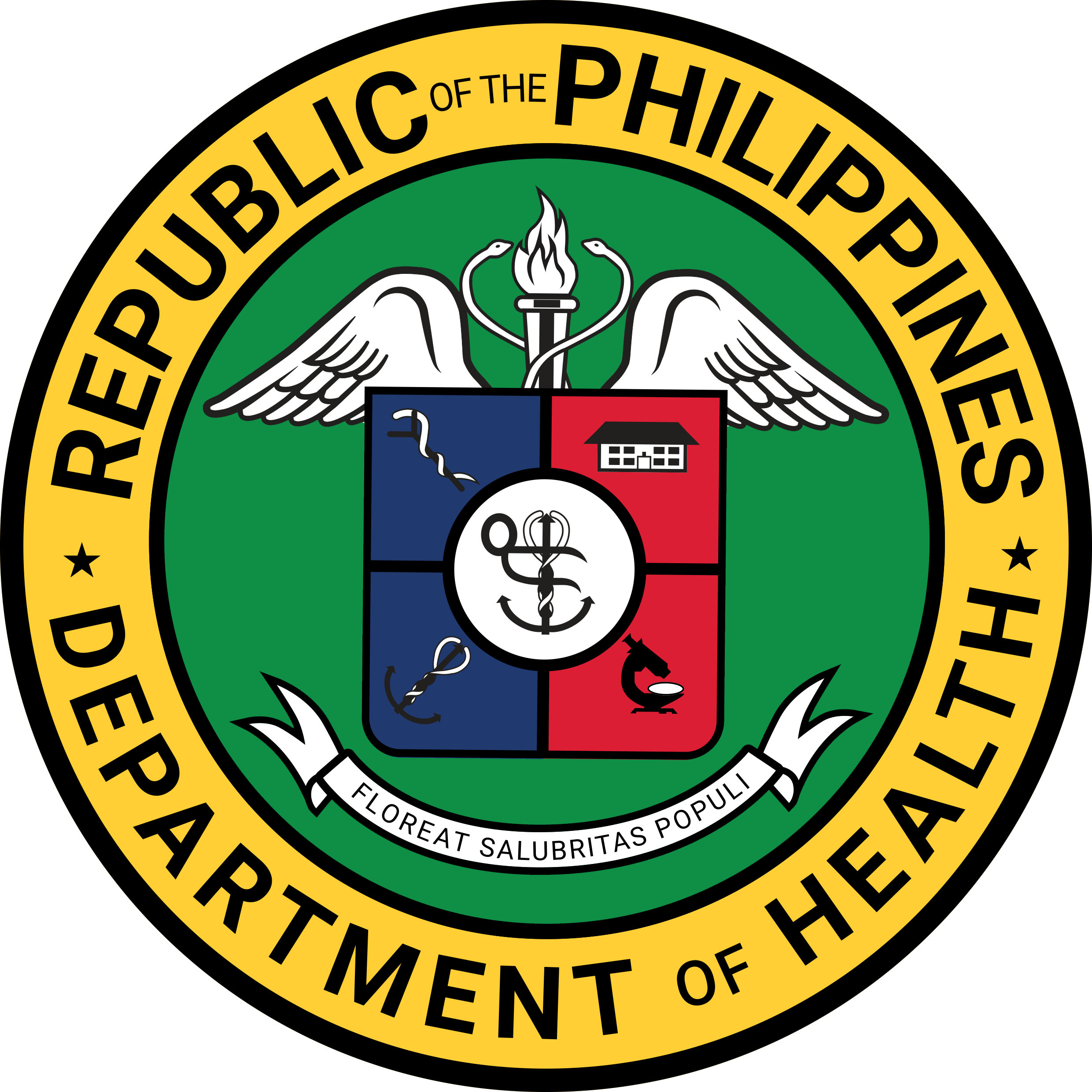
- Seal

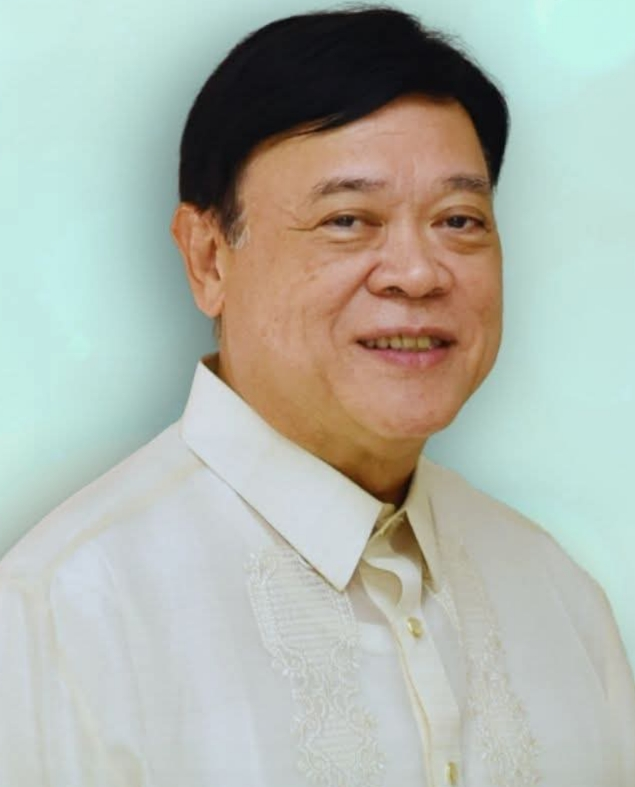
- Incumbent; Edwin Mercado (Ad interim) since August 10, 2026
- Style: The Honorable
- Member of: Cabinet
- Appointer: The president with the consent of the Commission on Appointments
- Term length: No fixed term
- Inaugural holder: Sergio Osmeña
- Formation: November 15, 1935
- Website: www.doh.gov.ph

The secretary of health (Filipino: Kalihim ng Kalusugan) is the Cabinet of the Philippines member who is in charge of the Department of Health. The secretary of health is also the ex-officio chairperson of the Philippine Health Insurance Corporation (PhilHealth).

== Functions ==
The following are the functions of a secretary:

- Advise the president on health;
- Establish policies and standards for the department's operations;
- Promulgate rules and regulations;
- Exercise supervision and control over the department;
- Delegate authority to any undersecretary or other appropriate officials of the department; and
- Perform other functions provided by law or assigned by the president.

== List of secretaries of health ==
=== Secretary of Public Instruction, Health and Welfare (1941–1944) ===
Portrait	Name (Birth–Death)	Took office	Left office	President
	Sergio Osmeña (Note: In concurrent capacity as the Vice President.) (1878–1961)	December 24, 1941	August 1, 1944	Manuel L. Quezon

=== Commissioner of Education, Health and Welfare (1942–1943) ===
Portrait	Name (Birth–Death)	Took office	Left office	Chairman of the Philippine Executive Commission
	Claro M. Recto (1890–1960)	January 26, 1942	October 14, 1943	Jorge B. Vargas

=== Minister of Education, Health and Welfare (1943–1944) ===
Portrait	Name (Birth–Death)	Took office	Left office	President
	Gabriel Mañalac; Acting	October 20, 1943	January 1, 1944	Jose P. Laurel

=== Minister of Health, Labor and Public Welfare (1944–1945) ===
Portrait	Name (Birth–Death)	Took office	Left office	President
	Emiliano Tría Tirona (1883–1952)	January 4, 1944	1945	Jose P. Laurel

=== Secretary of Health and Public Welfare (1945–1947) ===
Portrait	Name (Birth–Death)	Took office	Left office	President
	Basilio Valdes (1892–1970)	February 27, 1945	April; 1945	Sergio Osmeña
	Jose Locsin (1891–1977)	June 29, 1945	May 27, 1946	Sergio Osmeña
	Antonio Villarama	May 28, 1946	October 4, 1947	Manuel Roxas

=== Secretary of Health (1947–1978) ===
Portrait	Name (Birth–Death)	Took office	Left office	President
	Antonio Villarama	October 4, 1947	December 31, 1949	Manuel Roxas
	Antonio Villarama	October 4, 1947	December 31, 1949	Elpidio Quirino
	Juan Salcedo Jr. (1904–1988)	December 14, 1950	May; 1954	Elpidio Quirino
	Juan Salcedo Jr. (1904–1988)	December 14, 1950	May; 1954	Ramon Magsaysay
	Paulino Garcia	June; 1954	June; 1958	Ramon Magsaysay
	Paulino Garcia	June; 1954	June; 1958	Carlos P. Garcia
	Elpidio Valencia	July; 1958	December 30, 1961	Carlos P. Garcia
	Francisco Duque Jr.	December 30, 1961	July; 1963	Diosdado Macapagal
	Floro Dabu	July; 1963	December; 1964	Diosdado Macapagal
	Manuel A. Cuenco (1907–1970)	December; 1964	December 30, 1965	Diosdado Macapagal
	Paulino Garcia	December 30, 1965	August 2, 1968	Ferdinand Marcos
	Amadeo Cruz	August 2, 1968	December 25, 1971	Ferdinand Marcos
	Clemente Gatmaitan	December 25, 1971	June 2, 1978	Ferdinand Marcos

=== Minister of Health (1978–1987) ===
Portrait	Name (Birth–Death)	Took office	Left office	President
	Clemente Gatmaitan	June 2, 1978	July 23, 1979	Ferdinand Marcos
	Enrique Garcia	July 24, 1979	June 30, 1981	Ferdinand Marcos
	Jesus C. Azurin (1916–1990)	July 25, 1981	February 25, 1986	Ferdinand Marcos
	Alfredo Bengzon (1935–2026)	March 25, 1986	February 11, 1987	Corazon Aquino

=== Secretary of Health (from 1987) ===
Portrait	Name (Birth–Death)	Took office	Left office	President
	Alfredo Bengzon (1935–2026)	February 11, 1987	February 7, 1992	Corazon Aquino
	Antonio Periquet	February 10, 1992	June 30, 1992	Corazon Aquino
	Juan Flavier (1935–2014)	July 1, 1992	January 30, 1995	Fidel V. Ramos
	Jaime Galvez-Tan	January 30, 1995	July 5, 1995	Fidel V. Ramos
	Hilarion Ramiro Jr.	July 10, 1995	March 22, 1996	Fidel V. Ramos
	Carmencita Reodica	April 8, 1996	June 29, 1998	Fidel V. Ramos
	Felipe Estrella	June 30, 1998	September 13, 1998	Joseph Estrada
	Alberto Romualdez (1940–2013)	September 14, 1998	January 20, 2001	Joseph Estrada
	Manuel Dayrit	January 20, 2001	June 1, 2005	Gloria Macapagal Arroyo
	Francisco Duque III (born 1957)	June 1, 2005	September 1, 2009	Gloria Macapagal Arroyo
	Esperanza Cabral	September 1, 2009	June 30, 2010	Gloria Macapagal Arroyo
	Enrique Ona (born 1939)	June 30, 2010	December 19, 2014	Benigno Aquino III
	Janette Garin (born 1972)	February 17, 2015	June 30, 2016	Benigno Aquino III
	Paulyn Ubial (born 1962); Interim	June 30, 2016	October 10, 2017	Rodrigo Duterte
	Herminigildo Valle; Officer in Charge	October 12, 2017	October 25, 2017	Rodrigo Duterte
	Francisco Duque III (born 1957)	October 26, 2017	June 30, 2022	Rodrigo Duterte
	Maria Rosario Vergeire (born 1968); Officer in Charge	July 14, 2022	June 5, 2023	Bongbong Marcos
	Ted Herbosa (born 1959)	June 5, 2023	July 13, 2026	Bongbong Marcos
	Jose Pujalte Jr. Ad interim	July 13, 2026	August 10, 2026	Bongbong Marcos
	Edwin M. Mercado; Ad interim	August 10, 2026	Incumbent	Bongbong Marcos
