= Northern Mindanao Wellness and Reintegration Center =

- Department of Health

Geography
- Location: Malaybalay, Bukidnon, Philippines
- Coordinates: 8°08′29″N 125°06′39″E

Services
- Beds: 576

History
- Founded: 2018

The Northern Mindanao Wellness and Reintegration Center (NMWRC) is a drug rehabilitation facility in Malaybalay, Bukidnon, Philippines.

== History ==
=== Development ===
A memorandum of agreement was signed by February 2018 for the construction of a drug rehabilitation center in Malaybalay, Bukidnon. The signatories included representatives from the Department of the Interior and Local Government, the Department of Health, the Office of the President, the City Government of Malaybalay, Kitson Kho of Kinming (Xiamen) Real Estate Company, and the Friends of the Philippines Foundation. Senator Miguel Zubiri, a native of Bukidnon is also a signatory.

The local government Malaybalay donated the land for the drug rehabilitation facility. Malaybalay was chosen as the site of the facility because it was about equidistant to various key cities in Mindanao. The facility is a donation by the Friends of the Philippines Foundation and Kinming (Xiamen) Real Estate Co.

=== Construction ===
The groundbreaking took place on May 25, 2017. The ceremony was led by Philippine President Rodrigo Duterte and Chinese Ambassador to the Philippines Zhao Jianhua. The Chinese-owned and Hong Kong-based Friends of the Philippines Foundation financed the design and construction of the facility. The facility costed ₱500 million.

=== Inauguration ===
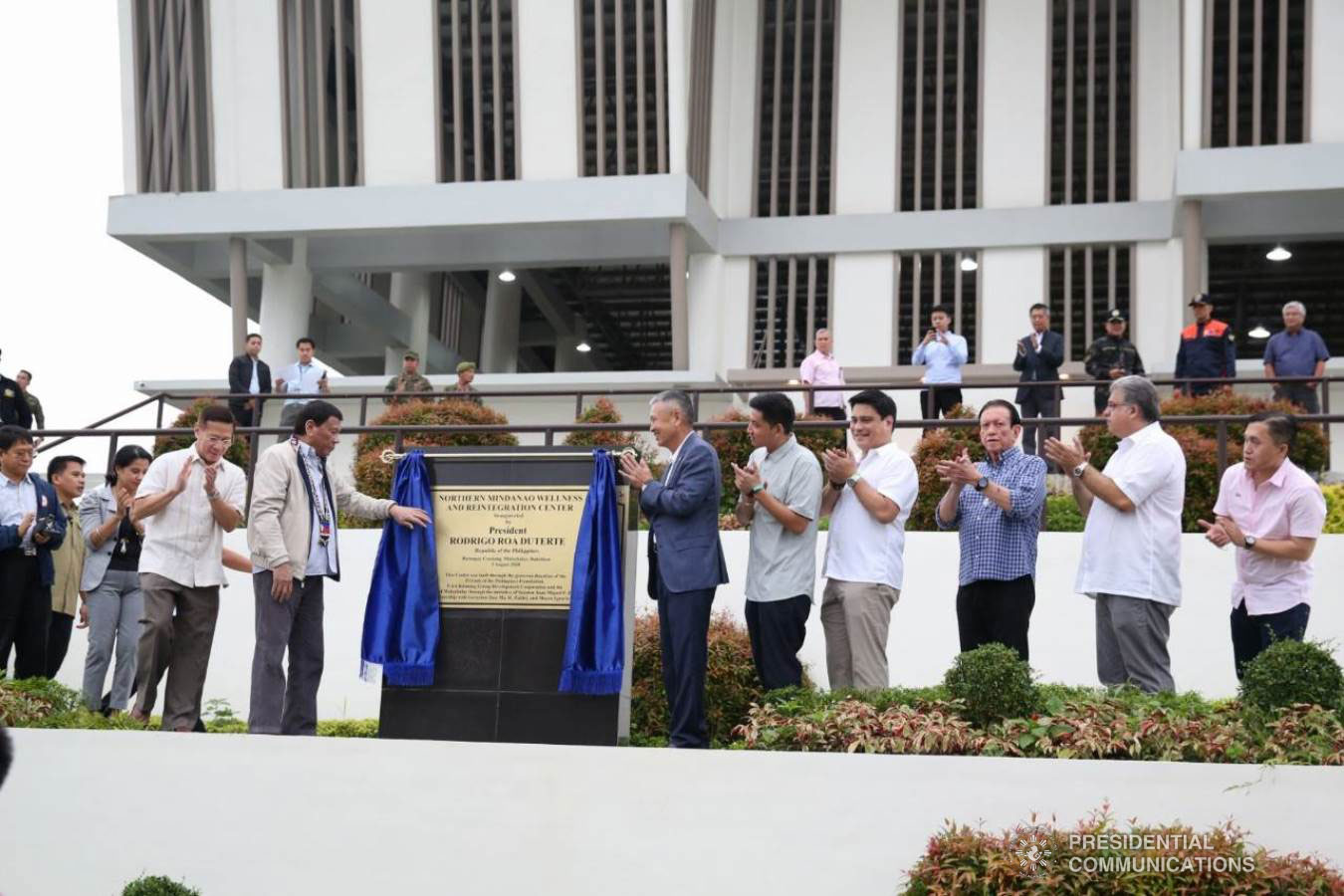
President Rodrigo Duterte (foreground, 5th from left) during the inauguration of the facility in Malaybalay, Bukidnon on August 3, 2018

President Duterte led the inauguration ceremonies on August 3, 2018, hailing the project as a product of China–Philippines relations "at its best" thanking the Chinese government for its support for his campaign against illegal drugs.

== Facilities ==
The center has a bed capacity of 576 and can accommodate 600 patients within a 6-month treatment cycle. Medical, therapeutic, and social interventions are made to patients. It has training facilities to help patients reintegrate to mainstream society by the provision of skills training and technical-vocational education which they could devise once they are discharged from the rehabilitation center. The center also aims to address other health issues related to drug use such as HIV/AIDS.

The drug rehabilitation center includes dormitories (three for patients and one for the center's staff), a training center, a medical service building, a visitors building, and a central supply building. It also has facilities for recreation such as a gymnasium, separate basketball courts, a mini amphitheater, courtyards and gardens.

== Administration ==
The center is under the operation and management of the Department of Health. Upon its completion the Friends of the Philippines Foundation will donate ₱13 million annually for the rehabilitation center's operations.

== See also ==
- Philippine drug war
- Mega Drug Treatment and Rehabilitation Center
