= Maria Rosario Vergeire =

Undersecretary of Department of Health of the Philippines

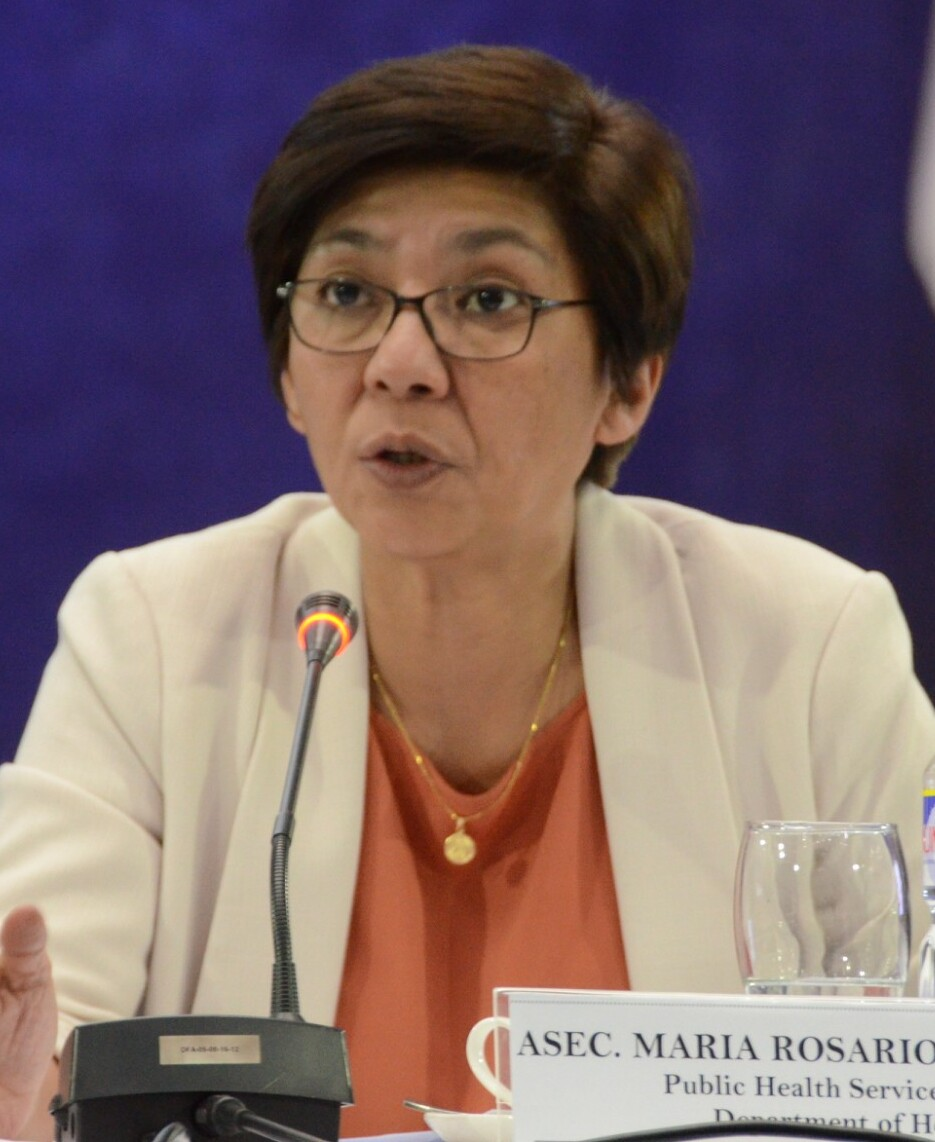
- Vergeire in 2020

Secretary of Health
- Officer in Charge
- In office July 14, 2022 – June 5, 2023
- President: Bongbong Marcos
- Preceded by: Francisco Duque III
- Succeeded by: Ted Herbosa

Undersecretary of Health
- In office June 5, 2023 – 2025
- President: Bongbong Marcos

DOH Spokesperson
- In office 2015–2022
- President: Benigno Aquino III; Rodrigo Duterte

Personal details
- Born: Maria Rosario Clarissa Dumandan Singh; November 1968 (age 57)
- Relatives: Maria Filomena Singh (sister)
- Education: University of Santo Tomas (BS); De La Salle Medical and Health Sciences Institute (MD); University of the Philippines Manila (MPH)

Maria Rosario Clarissa Singh-Vergeire (born Maria Rosario Clarissa Dumandan Singh) is a Filipino physician and public health official. She formerly served as the top undersecretary of the Department of Health from June 2023 to July 2025. She also served as the officer in charge of the department from July 14, 2022, to June 5, 2023, following her appointment by President Bongbong Marcos. She was also the department's spokesperson beginning in 2015 under the Benigno Aquino III and Rodrigo Duterte administrations, as well as the department's assistant secretary for public health services from 2015 to 2020.

== Early life and education ==
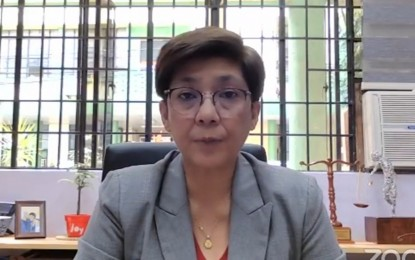
Vergeire conducting a DOH Media Forum on December 6, 2021

Maria Rosario Vergeire is the third of six children born to barangay chairman and political strategist Harry Francisco Macalanda Singh (1940–2020) and lawyer Clara Dizon Dumandan-Singh (1934–2021). Her eldest sister Maria Filomena Singh ("Monette", born 1966) is a lawyer and judge currently serving as an Associate Justice of the Supreme Court since 2022; their family lives in Marikina. Vergeire earned her bachelor's degree in zoology from the University of Santo Tomas and her Doctor of Medicine degree from De La Salle College of Medicine (now De La Salle Medical and Health Sciences Institute). She later earned a Master of Public Health degree from the University of the Philippines Manila.

== Career ==
Starting in 1996, Vergeire spent 11 years working at the Marikina City Health Office. She joined the Department of Health in 2007 as a medical officer in the Health Policy Development and Planning Bureau. She left the agency in 2025.

Political offices
Preceded by Francisco Duque III	Secretary of Health (Officer in Charge); 2022–2023	Succeeded by Ted Herbosa
