= San Beda College of Medicine =

Medical school

- Motto: Fides, Scientia, Virtus
- Type: Private
- Established: 2002
- Parent institution: San Beda University
- Religious affiliation: Roman Catholic (Benedictine)
- Dean: Fernandino Fontanilla
- Location: Manila, Philippines
- Colors: Red, White
- Website: www.sanbeda.edu.ph

The San Beda College of Medicine (abbreviated as SBCM) is the medical school of the San Beda University in Manila established in 2002.

== History ==
The San Beda College with the power of autonomy granted by CHED for five years created a consortium with the Loyola Medical College Foundation, Inc. to establish the San Beda College of Medicine. On March 9, 2002, the Board of Trustees of San Beda College approved the establishment of the fifth unit of San Beda, the San Beda College of Medicine. It offered a four-year course leading to the Degree of Doctor of Medicine. The College opened for the school term 2002–2003 at its temporary home on the 5th floor of the Summit One Tower Building, 530 Shaw Boulevard, Mandaluyong to 143 first year medical students. One year later, on June 16, 2003, the College of Medicine transferred to the San Beda College Main Campus at Mendiola Street, Manila. It occupied the St. Benedict’s Hall. By 2005–2006, the College of Medicine had the full complement of year levels with the Clinical clerks (4th year medical students).

== Performance in Medical Licensure Examination ==
Date of Licensure Exam	Passed(First Timers)	Passing Percentage
November 2020	102/109	93.58%
September 2019	88/91	96.70%
March 2019	4/4	100%
September 2018	87/88	98.86%
March 2018	6/7	85.71%
September 2017	98/99	98.99%
September 2016	57/62	91.94%
August 2015	63/65	96.92%
February 2015	4/4	100%
August 2014	45/50	90%
February 2013	4/4	100%
August 2012	31/37	83.78%

== Curriculum ==
San Beda College of Medicine offers a 4-year MD program designed according to the Commission of Higher Education’s Outcome-Based Medical Education model.

== Notable alumni ==
- Grace Arviola, MD -3rd Place, August 2014 Licensure Examination
- Mary Angeline So, MD -4th Place, February 2013 Licensure Examination

== Affiliations ==
Affiliated Hospitals	Area
Quirino Memorial Medical Center	Internal Medicine, Surgery, Pediatrics, Obstetrics and Gynecology
East Avenue Medical Center	Ophthalmology, Orthopedics, Otorhinolaryngology, Internal Medicine
National Kidney and Transplant Institute	Radiology
Makati Medical Center	Neurosciences
V. Luna General Hospital	Psychiatry
Cannosa Health and Social Center	Family and Community Medicine
