= Mega Drug Abuse Treatment and Rehabilitation Center =

- Department of Health
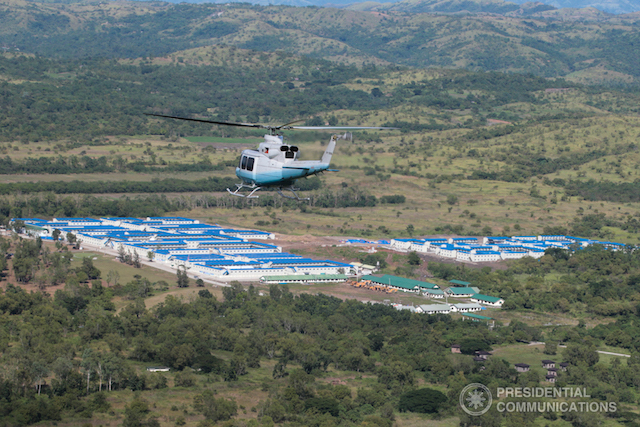

- Location within Nueva Ecija Location within Luzon Location within Philippines

Geography
- Location: Fort Magsaysay, Nueva Ecija, Philippines
- Coordinates: 15°25′35″N 121°05′41″E

Services
- Beds: 10,000

History
- Founded: October 17, 2016 (soft opening); November 29, 2016 (full opening)

Links
- Website: https://megadatrc.doh.gov.ph/

The Mega Drug Abuse Treatment and Rehabilitation Center (Mega DATRC), also known as the Mega Drug Treatment and Rehabilitation Center, is a drug rehabilitation center at Fort Magsaysay, Nueva Ecija, Philippines.

== Construction ==
The drug rehabilitation facility's construction commenced in July 2016 but construction only went full swing after Health Secretary Paulyn Jean Ubial signed a deed of donation with Chinese billionaire and philanthropist Huang Rulun in a meeting in Beijing, China. Huang previously met with President Rodrigo Duterte and talked about how could help deal with the illegal drugs problem in the Philippines. Huang met with Duterte thrice with two of the meetings conducted during his presidential campaign.

The facility was constructed in a 75,000 hectares (190,000 acres) land at Fort Magsaysay. The land where the facility is to be located was identified by the Department of National Defense (DND).

75 shipping containers of China-imported material will be used in the construction of the facility. The materials to be used are the same to those used in facilities erected as part of the rehabilitation of areas affected by Typhoon Haiyan (Yolanda). The materials are also stated to be fire-resistant and the construction project of the facility also include water and electricity works.

By October 12, 2016, the facility was stated to be 50 percent complete with the right wing of the building which can accommodate about 1,000 patients already ready to be furnished. The left wing and the female dormitory is being constructed by this time. The facility had its soft opening on October 17, 2016 with the newly hired staff of the facility set to have a "dry-run' on patient management before the facility was scheduled to begin accommodating drug dependents within the month of November 2016.

President Rodrigo Duterte is scheduled to lead the inauguration or full opening rites of the facility at 2:00 p.m. (UTC+8) on November 29, 2016. The inauguration marks the completion of the Phase I of the project.

== Facilities ==
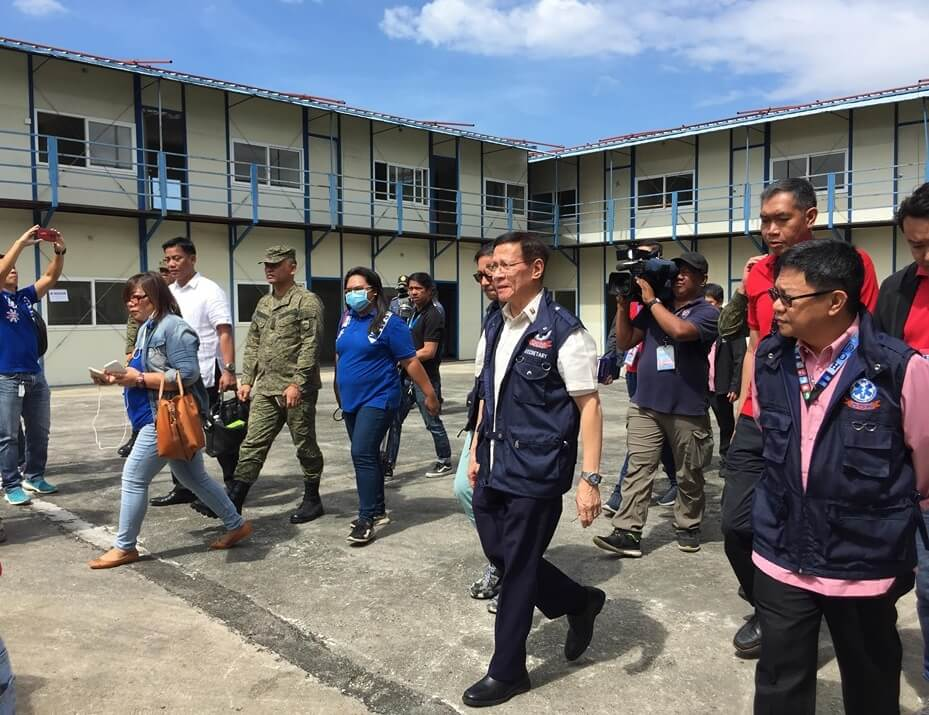
Health Secretary Francisco Duque led the inspection of the drug rehabilitation facility in February 2020. The facility was among those being considered as possible quarantine site for repatriated Filipinos from Wuhan, China due to the 2019-20 novel coronavirus outbreak.

The drug rehabilitation facility was expected host around 10,000 bed facilities in portable modular buildings. Upon its inauguration in November 2016, the facility was expected host an initial 2,500 bed facilities.

== Management ==
The drug rehabilitation facility is to be put under the Department of Health. The DOH was scheduled to turn over the facility to the military once the number of admitted drug dependents is significantly reduced. The operating expenses for the facility for 2017 is estimated to be around ₱500 million. As of mid-2022 its medical and support staff is composed of 110 personnel. In the same year, the center's therapeutic approach was modified after it adopted the standard introduced by the Japan International Cooperation Agency. Only volunteers with no criminal record can be accommodated by the center for security reasons.

== Reception ==
Dangerous Drugs Board chairman Dionisio Santiago described the facility as a "mistake" and "impractical" saying it would be better if the funds used to build the facility was used on smaller community-based rehabilitation programs that would accommodate 150 to 200 drug dependents instead which he believes would be effective. He also says it is difficult to admit patients from far-flung areas such as Batangas and Batanes. Santiago was forced to resign after President Rodrigo Duterte was irked by the remark. In June 2017, the facility had 311 residents.

Under Phases 1 and 2 of the project, the facility accommodated 1,250 residents. The capacity was reduced to 350 beds at the peak of the COVID-19 pandemic. In Phase 3 it took in 4,000 soldiers while in Phase 4 it accommodated 500 COVID-19 patients. A February 2022 report by the Department of Health concedes that it was unrealistic to run the facility at full capacity as it is only one of 30 run by the government around the Philippines. By mid 2022, the Mega DATRC helped 3,200 residents recover.

== Proposal to convert to a prison ==
In April 2022, the Department of Justice revealed plans to convert the rehabilitation center into a prison in a bid to reduce the congestion of detainees at the New Bilibid Prison in Muntinlupa.

== See also ==
- Philippine drug war
- Northern Mindanao Wellness and Reintegration Center
