= Roberto Romulo =

Filipino diplomat

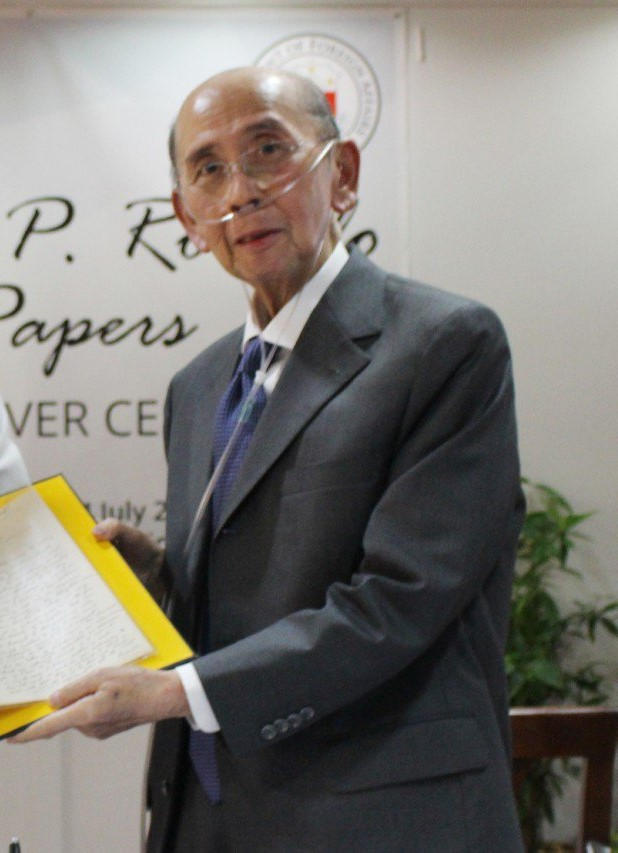
- Romulo in 2019

19th Secretary of Foreign Affairs
- In office June 30, 1992 – April 30, 1995
- President: Fidel V. Ramos
- Preceded by: Raul Manglapus
- Succeeded by: Domingo Siazon, Jr.

Personal details
- Born: December 9, 1938 Manila, Philippine Commonwealth
- Died: January 23, 2022 (aged 83)
- Education: Ateneo de Manila University
- Occupation: Diplomat

Roberto "Bobby" Romulo (December 9, 1938 – January 23, 2022) was a Filipino diplomat. He was the Secretary of the Philippines Department of Foreign Affairs from 1992 to 1995.

== Early life and education ==
Roberto Romulo was born on December 9, 1938, in Manila to Carlos P. Romulo and Virginia Llamas.

He attended the Georgetown University of the United States where he finished his primary, secondary Georgetown Preparatory School and college education before returning to the Philippines to study at the Ateneo de Manila University's College of Law to obtain his law degree.

== Career ==
=== Diplomatic career ===
Romulo under the administration of President Corazon Aquino served as Ambassador to Belgium, Luxembourg, and the Commission of the European Communities. As a diplomat, he received various honors from Belgium, Thailand, Spain, Chile, France and the Philippines.

He was appointed Secretary of Foreign Affairs in 1992 by President Fidel V. Ramos. As head of the Department of Foreign Affairs, he oversaw the case of Flor Contemplacion, a Filipino migrant worker in Singapore, who was sentenced to death for murder which human rights groups argued were coerced to admit to committing crime. Contemplacion's execution led to a diplomatic crisis with the city-state and Romulo's resignation as secretary on April 30, 1995.

=== Private sector career ===
Romulo began his career at IBM in 1965, holding management roles in New York, Thailand, and the Philippines.

After leaving government in 1995, he returned to the private sector as chairman of PLDT and vice chairman of San Miguel Corporation. Romulo later led the Carlos P. Romulo Foundation and the Zuellig Family Foundation, and contributed columns to The Philippine Star.

== Death ==
Romulo died on January 23, 2022.
