= Philippine College of Physicians =

Philippines College of Physicians
- Abbreviation: PCP
- Formation: 1953
- Headquarters: 22nd Floor One San Miguel Bldg. San Miguel Avenue, Ortigas Center, Pasig, Philippines
- Members: 13,000
- Leader: Rontgene M. Solante, MD, FPCP (President)
- Website: pcp.org.ph

The Philippine College of Physicians (PCP) is an umbrella organization, formed in 1952, of internists in the Philippines. It was founded by Dr. Gonzalo F. Austria.

Its three main aims are:

1. Continuing medical education of internists and other physicians;
2. Certification and regulation of the subspecialty of Internal Medicine;
3. Accreditation of the training institutions for Internal Medicine in the Philippines.

== An Affiliate Society of Philippine Medical Association (PMA) ==
The PCP is an affiliate society of the Philippine Medical Association and a member-society of the International Society of Internal Medicine. The College has a total of more than 12,000 members composed of fellows, diplomates and affiliate members. The title of Diplomate in Internal Medicine is awarded by the PCP to an internist who has fulfilled all the requirements set by the Philippine Specialty Board of Internal Medicine which administers the certifying examinations annually. The title of Fellow is awarded to a Diplomate in Internal Medicine who has fulfilled the requirements for membership as Fellow in the PCP. Thus, an internist who has satisfactorily passed and fulfilled the requirements of the PCP and having been certified as such, may carry the title Diplomate in Internal Medicine and Fellow of the PCP (FPCP).

== Regional chapters ==
The College has twelve regional chapters nationwide:

- PCP Northern Luzon Chapter
- PCP Northwestern Luzon Chapter
- PCP Northeastern Luzon Chapter
- PCP Central Luzon Chapter
- PCP Southern Luzon Chapter
- PCP Bicol Chapter
- PCP Western Visayas Negros Occidental Chapter
- PCP Western Visayas Panay Chapter
- PCP Central Visayas Chapter
- PCP Eastern Visayas Chapter
- PCP Northern Mindanao Chapter
- PCP Western Mindanao Chapter
- PCP Southern Mindanao Chapter

As of the present, PCP has formed additional chapters in Metro Manila and other provinces.
