= Esperanza Cabral =

Filipina cardiologist and politician

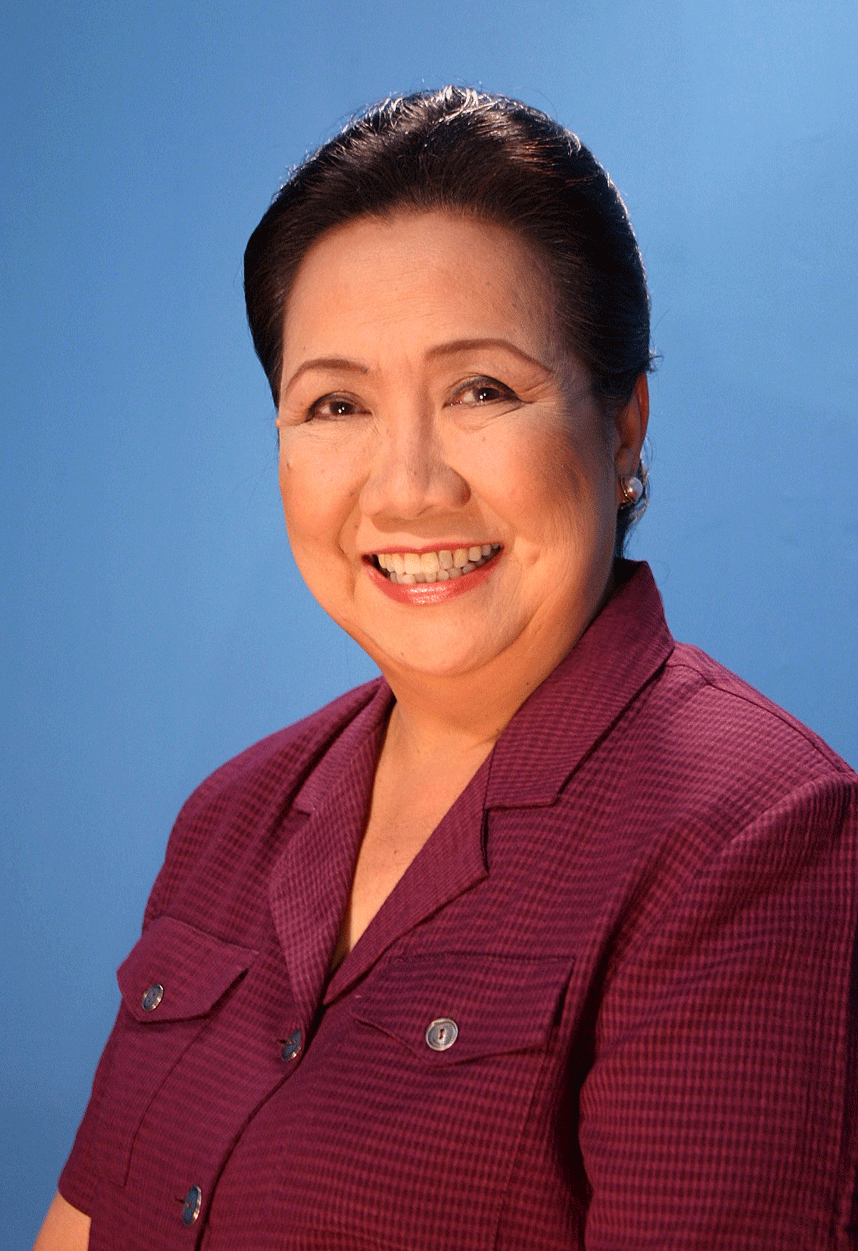

28th Secretary of Health
- In office September 1, 2009 – June 30, 2010
- President: Gloria Macapagal Arroyo
- Preceded by: Francisco T. Duque III
- Succeeded by: Enrique Ona

24th Secretary of Social Welfare and Development
- In office July 21, 2005 – August 31, 2009
- President: Gloria Macapagal Arroyo
- Preceded by: Corazon Soliman
- Succeeded by: Celia C. Yangco (OIC)

Personal details
- Born: Esperanza Alcantara Icasas; December 1
- Party: People's Reform Party
- Spouse: Bienvenido Cabral (m. 1968)
- Children: 3
- Education: University of the Philippines Diliman (BS, MD)
- Profession: Doctor

Esperanza Alcantara Icasas-Cabral is a Filipina cardiologist and clinical pharmacologist. She served as Secretary of the Department of Health in the Philippines, taking office in January 2010 to replace Dr. Francisco Duque III after his appointment as chairperson of the Civil Service Commission. Before her appointment as Secretary of Health, Cabral was previously the Secretary of the Department of Social Welfare and Development, with her establishing the Pantawid Pamilyang Pilipino Program (4Ps) in 2007. Dr. Cabral is married to Bienvenido Villegas Cabral, an ophthalmologist.

== Education ==
Cabral graduated from medical school at the University of the Philippines Manila. She extended her medical and pharmacological training at the U.P. Philippine General Hospital, Harvard Medical School, Massachusetts General Hospital, and the Joslin Clinic in Boston, Massachusetts.

== Career ==
Cabral has long served as an educator and leader in Philippine medicine. At the University of the Philippines College of Medicine, she was a professor of medicine and pharmacology. She served both as Director of the Philippine Heart Center and Chief of Cardiology of Asian Hospital and Medical Center. She authored and co-authored more than 85 scientific papers on hypertension, cardiovascular pharmacology and clinical and preventive cardiology. She educated the public as a TV show host on "HeartWatch" on IBC Channel 13 and "InfoMedico" on NBN Channel 4.

She served during the administration of President Corazon Aquino as Director of the Philippine Heart Center. She also consulted for the Dangerous Drugs Board (DDB), the Bureau of Food and Drugs (BFAD) and the Department of Health. Earlier she served as Commissioner for Science and Health on the National Commission on the Role of Filipino Women.

She has earned a number of awards.

One of her contributions as Secretary of Health was the DOH-FDA Administrative Order 2010-0008 (issued on March 18, 2010), which mandated all companies to include in all advertisements, promotional, and/or sponsorship activities or materials concerning food/dietary supplements the following phrase:

MAHALAGANG PAALALA: ANG (NAME OF PRODUCT) AY HINDI GAMOT AT HINDI DAPAT GAMITING PANGGAMOT SA ANUMANG URI NG SAKIT [Important reminder: (Name of product) is not a medicinal drug and should not be used to treat the symptoms of any disease.]

Fearing that the new directive may impact food/dietary supplement companies in a negative way, the Chamber of Herbal Industries of the Philippines (composed of over 65 firms in the country engaged in the manufacture, research and distribution of these products) filed a petition for injunction against it at the Manila Regional Trial Court Branch No. 30 in May 2010. Presiding judge Lilia Purugganan granted it, however, it was lifted on November 28, 2014, after the DOH (which was then led by Enrique Ona) won its appeal at the Court of Appeals Special Fourth Division.

In January 2010, the National Bureau of Investigation filed a libel complaint on behalf of Secretary Cabral after a blog post under the pseudonym "Ella Rose delos Santos" alleged "...that she [Sec. Cabral] and the DSWD employees are corrupt, having diverted donated goods for personal gain at the expense of the typhoon victims and [are] downright incompetent."

According to a report by Reuters, the United States military ran a propaganda campaign to spread disinformation about the Sinovac Chinese COVID-19 vaccine, including using fake social media accounts to spread the disinformation that the Sinovac vaccine contained pork-derived ingredients and was therefore haram under Islamic law. The campaign was described as "payback" for COVID-19 disinformation by China directed against the U.S. The Philippines, which had a low vaccination rate at the time, was a primary target of the campaign. Following the publication of the report in 2024, Cabral stated that she was "sure there are lots of people who died from COVID who did not need to die from COVID".

Government offices
Preceded by Francisco Duque	Secretary of Health; 2009–2010	Succeeded by Enrique Ona
