= Enrique Ona =

Filipino surgeon and public servant

29th Secretary of Health
- In office June 30, 2010 – December 19, 2014
- President: Benigno Aquino III
- Preceded by: Esperanza Cabral
- Succeeded by: Janette Garin

Executive Director of National Kidney and Transplant Institute
- In office 1999–2010
- President: Joseph Estrada; Gloria Macapagal Arroyo
- Succeeded by: Aileen Riego-Javier

Personal details
- Born: Enrique Tangonan Ona Jr. June 4, 1939 (age 87) Sagay, Negros Occidental, Commonwealth of the Philippines
- Education: University of the Philippines Manila
- Occupation: Surgeon; Government official
- Profession: Doctor

Enrique Tangonan Ona (born June 4, 1939) is a Filipino surgeon and public servant. He was the Secretary of the Department of Health from 2010 to 2014, succeeding Dr. Esperanza Cabral. Recognized as one of the top surgeons in the field of vascular surgery and organ transplantation, he earned his Doctor of Medicine (M.D.) from the University of the Philippines College of Medicine at the University of the Philippines Manila.

== Background ==
Dr. Ona hails from Pagadian City. He is the son of the first Provincial Health Officer of Zamboanga del Sur.

Before being appointed by President Benigno Aquino III to the Health secretary post, Ona was the executive director of the National Kidney and Transplant Institute (NKTI), the post he held for 11 years and has been the president of the Transplantation Society of the Philippines since 1989. He also holds a medical license in the state of Massachusetts, United States.

== Health Secretary ==
After being appointed to the Health Department post, president Benigno Aquino III has instructed him "with regard to expediting universal coverage of PhilHealth, which was one of the campaign promises of Aquino considering that health is the third priority in the platform of the Aquino administration."

== Awards and recognition ==
- The Presidential Award of Recognition in Organ Transplantation, Year 2000.
- Ten Outstanding Young Men (TOYM) awardee for Medicine in 1979.

Preceded by Esperanza Cabral	Philippine Secretary of Health; 2010 – 2014	Succeeded by Janette Garin
