= Philippine Medical Association =

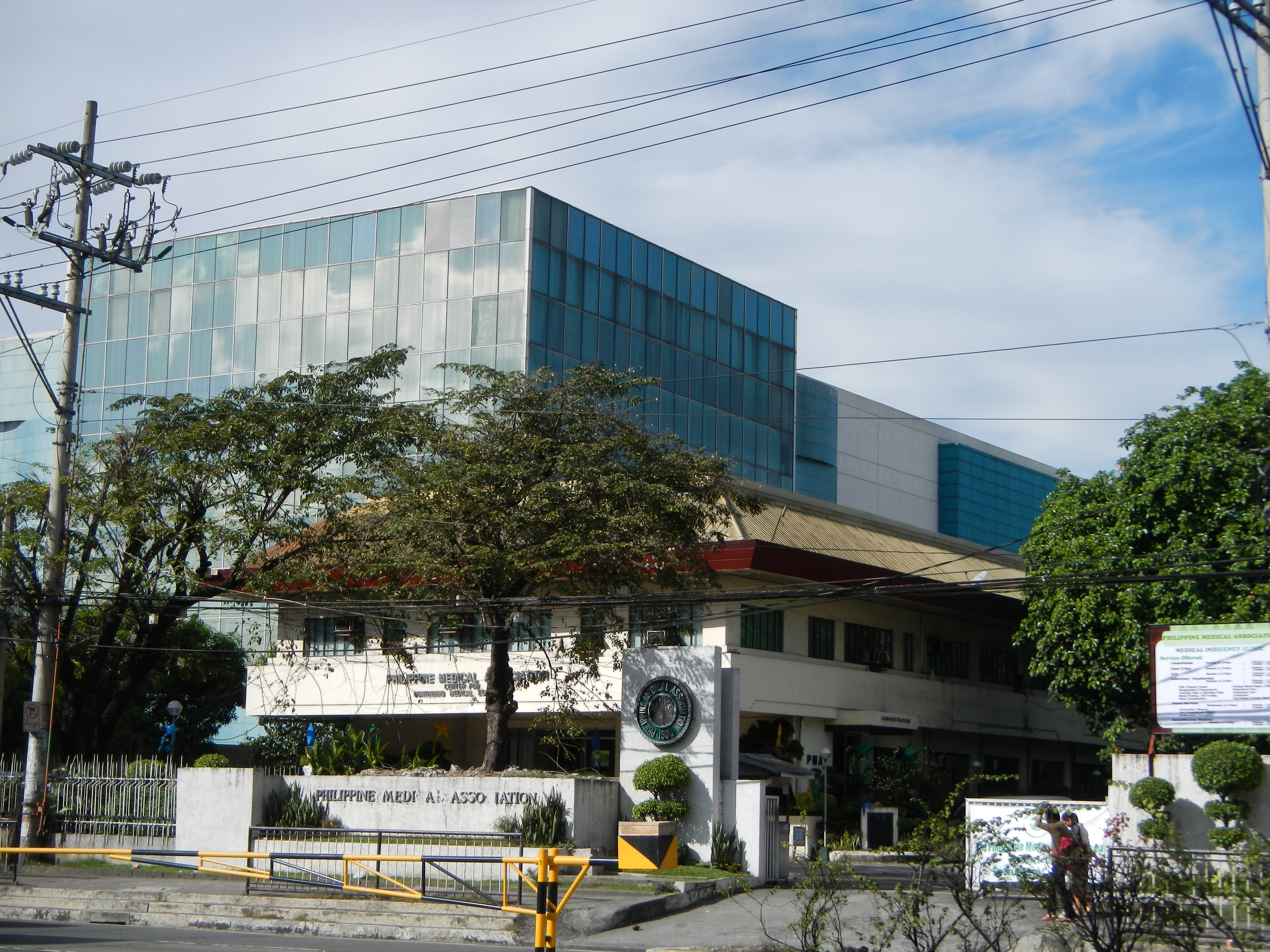
Facade of the PMA

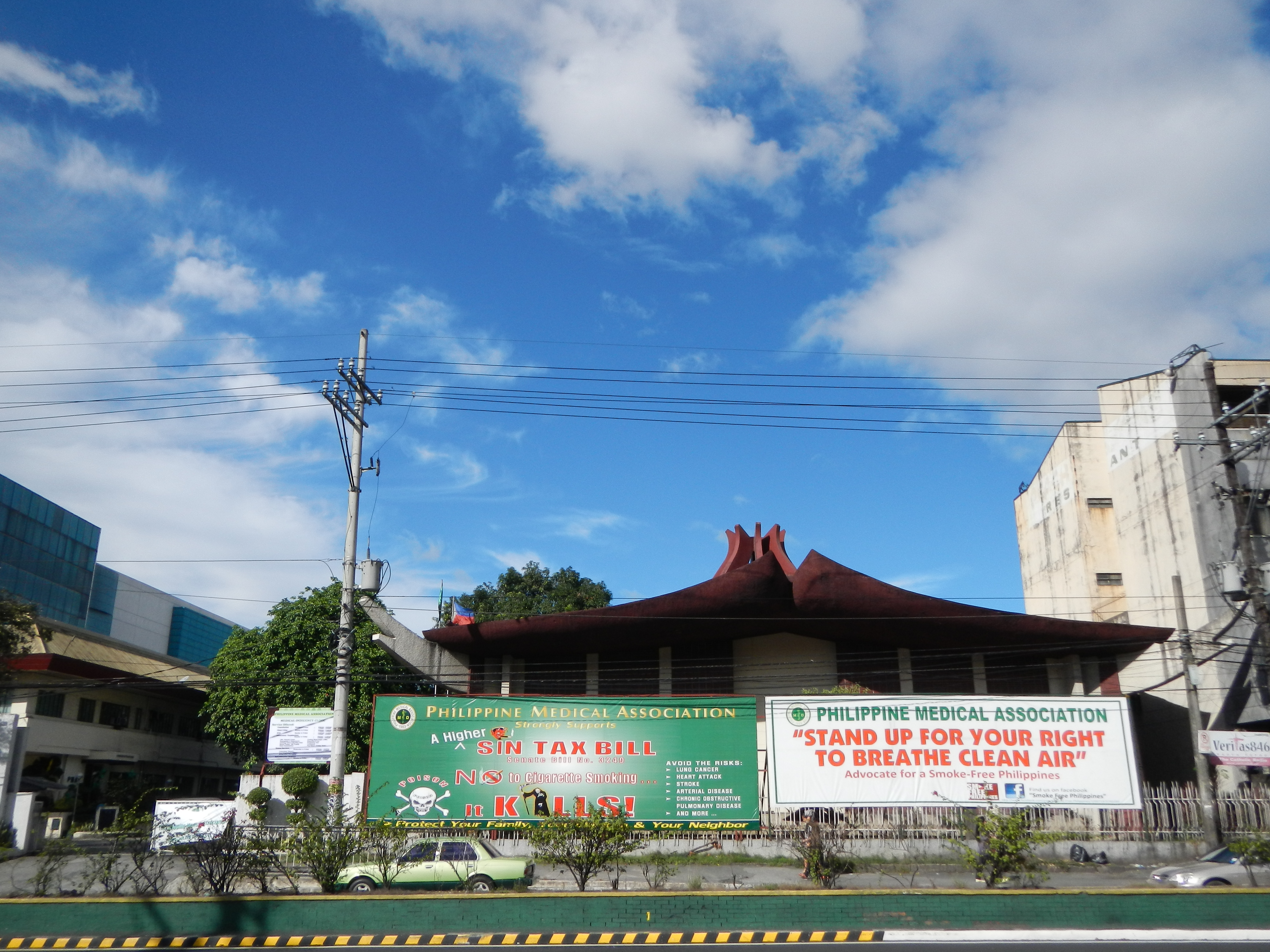
Philippine Medical Association Secretariat (PMA Bldg., North Avenue, Quezon City 1105).

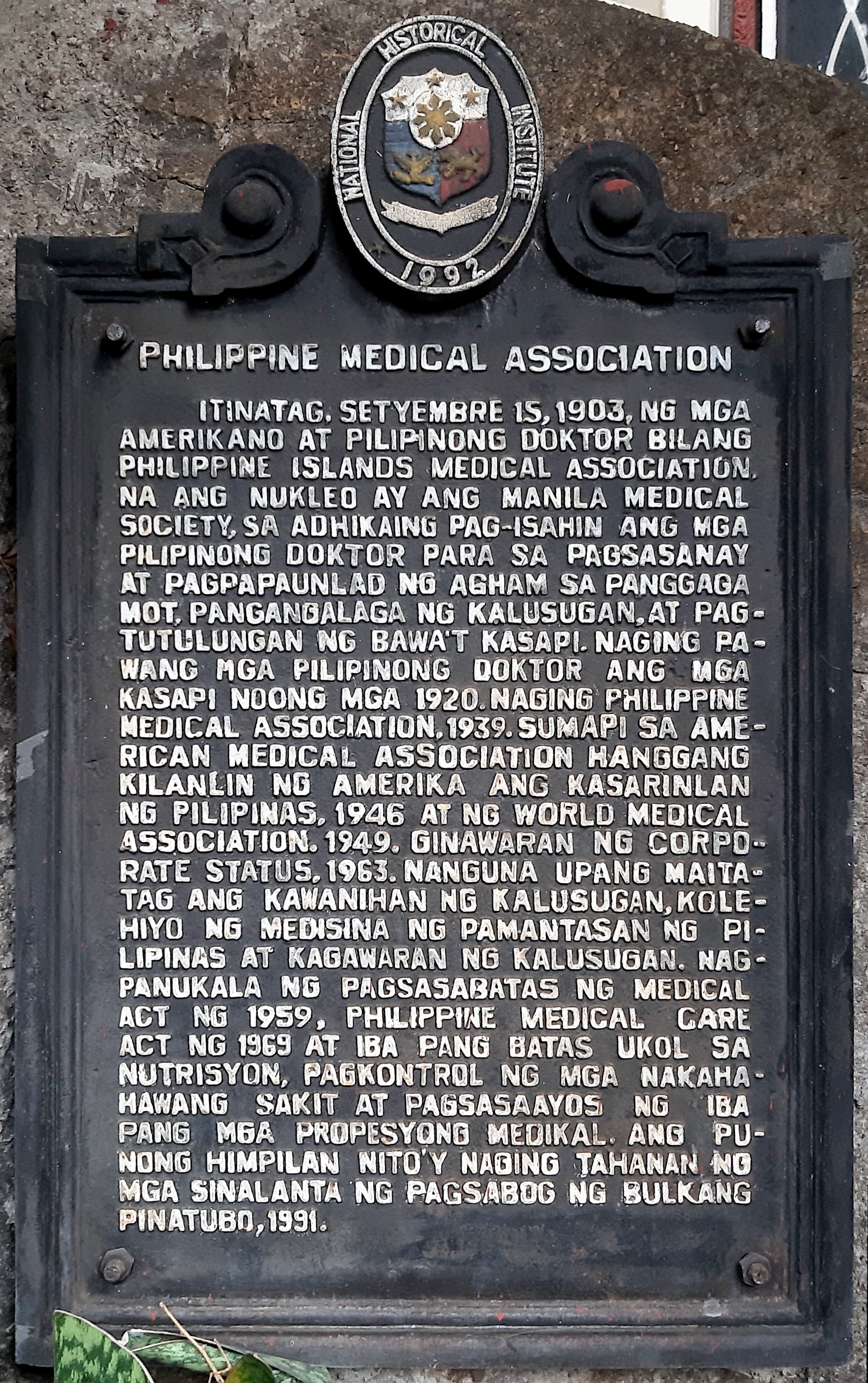
National historical marker installed in 1992

Philippine Medical Association is the primary medical association of the Philippines, covering medical practitioners and component medical groups from the entire country.

It is a member of the World Medical Association and is a co-founder of the Confederation of Medical Associations of Asia and Oceania. It is also the co-founder of Medical Associations of South East Asian Nations.

== See also ==
- Philippine College of Physicians
