= Philippine Health Insurance Corporation =

State-owned health insurance company of the Philippines

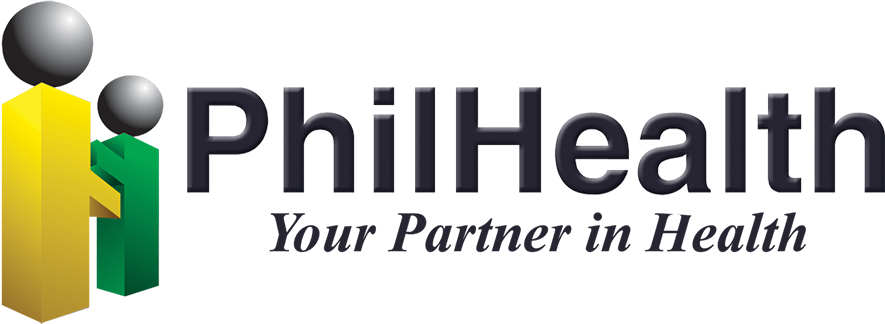
- Type: Government-owned and controlled corporation
- Industry: Insurance
- Founded: February 5, 1995; 31 years ago
- Headquarters: Citystate Centre, 709 Shaw Boulevard, Oranbo, Pasig
- Area served: Philippines
- Key people: Edwin Mercado (Chairman); Beverly Ho (President and CEO)
- Services: Health insurance, Universal health coverage
- Net income: ▼ ₱148.3 billion (2022)
- Owner: Department of Health
- Website: www.philhealth.gov.ph

The Philippine Health Insurance Corporation (PhilHealth; Filipino: Korporasyon sa Segurong Pangkalusugan ng Pilipinas) is a tax-exempt, government-owned and controlled corporation in the Philippines that provides national health insurance. PhilHeath was preceded by the Philippine Medical Care Act of 1969, which was signed by President Ferdinand Marcos and implemented in August 1971. The corporation was created in 1995 to provide universal health care in the Philippines, and is attached to the country's Department of Health.

PhilHealth's goal is to "ensure a sustainable national health insurance program for all." In 2010, it said it had achieved "universal" coverage (86 percent of the population; however, the 2008 National Demographic Health Survey indicated that only 38 percent of respondents were aware of at least one household member enrolled in PhilHealth.

Individuals who can afford health insurance pay monthly, quarterly or yearly premiums to PhilHealth, and the premium is based on employment status and salary. Individuals who cannot afford the premium are subsidized by the national or local government.

== History ==
The Philippine Medical Care Program began in 1971, following the Philippine Medical Care Act of 1969. It mandated the creation of the Philippine Medical Care Commission (PMCC). House Bill 14225 and Senate Bill 01738 became Republic Act 7875 in 1990, later known as "The National Health Insurance Act of 1995". Approved by President Fidel Ramos on February 14, 1995, it became the basis of the Philippine Health Insurance Corporation. On its 16th anniversary, the song "PhilHealth: Tapat na Serbisyo, Tapat na Benepisyo, Lahat Panalo" was introduced.

== Mandate and functions ==
PhilHealth has six membership categories, covering nearly the entire population. The "Formal" category includes workers employed by public and private companies and other institutions. "Indigents" are subsidized by the national government through the National Household Targeting System for Poverty Reduction. "Sponsored Members" are subsidized by their local governments. "Lifetime" (non-paying) members are retirees who have paid premiums for 120 months. Under Republic Act 10645, the "Senior Citizen" category makes all Filipino citizens 60 years old and older eligible for free PhilHealth coverage. The "Informal Economy" is composed of the self-employed, organized groups, Filipinos with dual citizenship, and natural-born citizens. Although treated separately, Overseas Filipino Workers (OFW) and migrant workers are part of the informal economy. Migrant workers are sub-categorized as land- or sea-based (sailors).

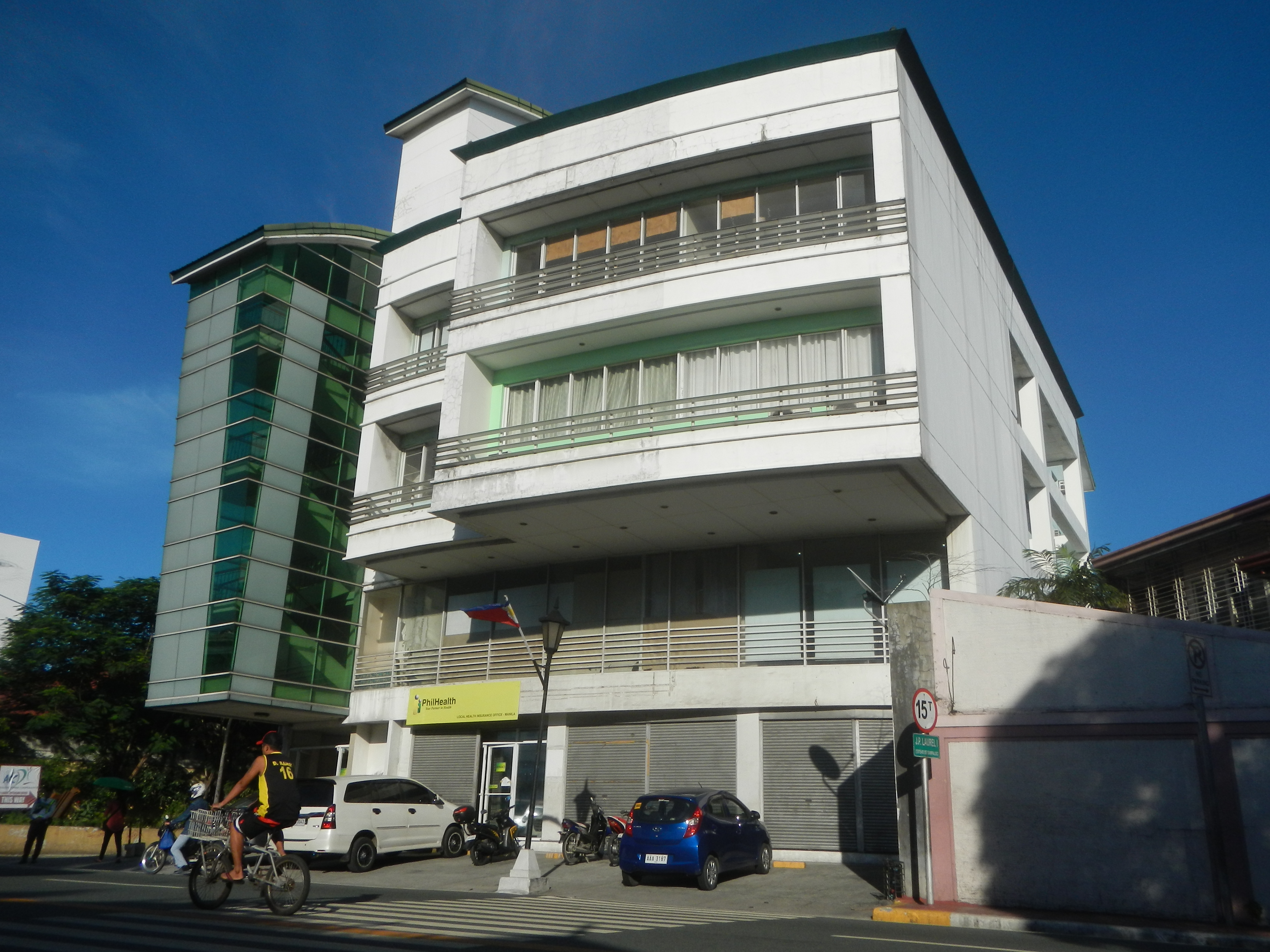
Jose Laurel Street, San Miguel, Manila

In 1996, the benefits package and delivery system changed. PhilHealth now has an outpatient and diagnostic package for indigent beneficiaries, providing nearly-comprehensive coverage. In 2011, 23 reimbursement rates (Case Rates) were introduced; two years later, all Case Rates were fully implemented. All other beneficiaries have access to nearly all comprehensive services, except for some outpatient care. PhilHealth has an accreditation program for private hospitals.

By June 2013, estimated coverage was 100 percent. The average wait time for payment to providers is estimated at 70 to 75 days, although the law requires PhilHealth to reimburse providers or members within 60 days. A December 1, 2009 move implemented a simplified reimbursement scheme, where most of a claim is reimbursed after a rapid assessment of member and provider eligibility and the remainder follows after detailed review of the claim. On average, 90 of every 100 claims are paid; three to four are denied, and six to seven are returned to healthcare providers for more information. Twenty-eight percent of claims were submitted by public providers, and 72 percent by private providers.

== Controversy ==
Philippine Senate Majority Leader Juan Miguel Zubiri alleged fraud by several hospitals in 2013, identifying cases that took millions of pesos from Philhealth. The state failed to prosecute doctors, private and public hospitals, and public officials. AFP Medical Center, St. Luke's Hospital, Philippine Orthopedic Center, University of Santo Tomas Hospital, East Avenue Medical Center, Cardinal Santos Medical Center, The Medical City, National Kidney and Transplant Institute, and General Santos Doctors Hospital (GSDH) were investigated for health-insurance fraud. In Iloilo, eye-doctor claims for 2,071 operations in 2006 (amounting to PHP16 million in professional fees) were also investigated. A hospital in Davao City noted that a janitor who was not a PhilHealth member had been lying in bed to claim benefits as a PhilHealth patient. In 2006, PhilHealth revoked the accreditation of Sara Medical Clinic in Midsayap for admitting non-existent patients.

A lawmaker learned in 2018 that Philhealth interim president Celestina Dela Serna lived in a hotel for P3,800 per night for at least a year instead of renting a condominium or apartment in Metro Manila. According to then-Negros Oriental representative Arnolfo Teves, he and then-House Speaker Pantaleon Alvarez spoke with Dela Serna during a House of Representatives event, and were surprised by her extravagant lifestyle. "She admitted to staying in the hotel for one year or more ... charged to Philhealth and she said she thought it was okay, that's why she did it," he said. Teves added that Dela Serna told him and Alvarez that she stayed at Legend Villas, where rooms cost at least ₱3,800 per night.

A Change.org petition was circulated by a group of overseas Filipino workers (OFWs) to scrap the agency's directive to increase the mandatory premium to three percent of monthly salaries. The petition referred to PhilHealth Circular 2020-0014 dated April 2, 2020, when OFW salaries were affected by the COVID-19 pandemic. President Rodrigo Duterte suspended the collections after a backlash, and the agency considered a longer payment period.

On July 24, 2020, anti-fraud legal officer Thorrsson Montes Keith resigned due to corruption and irregularities in the agency. His salary and hazard pay had been delayed, and his resignation would be effective August 31. According to presidential spokesman Harry Roque, the government would investigate alleged overpricing of a proposed IT system costing about ₱2 billion.

On August 25, 2021, Senator Richard Gordon presented a Senate committee report of its 2019 investigation of alleged fraud and corruption in the state-run health insurer. Video footage in the report included a PhilHealth regional vice president receiving a lap dance. According to Thorrsson Montes Keith, PhilHealth officials misappropriated at least ₱15 billion in overpriced IT projects, "ghost claims", and the misuse of COVID-19 funds. In Senate testimony, Keith compared PhilHealth officials to a "mafia" or "syndicate".

The following day, PhilHealth president and CEO Ricardo Morales said that he would resign. PhilHealth Senior Vice President for the Legal Sector Rodolfo del Rosario Jr. also resigned.

The Supreme Court of the Philippines invalidated the transfer of PhilHealth funds to the national treasury.

In September 2023, Philhealth was hacked with Medusa ransomware. Employee and other internal data was breached, with a possibility of member data. The hackers demanded $300,000 (about ₱17 million). Philhealth refused to pay the ransom, and the hacker group posted the stolen data on the dark web; data included hospital billing, internal memos, and identification documents. Philhealth said that member data, on a separate server, was not compromised. The National Privacy Commission began investigating the true extent of the leak.

On August 2, 2024, Senator Koko Pimentel and a public-health advocacy group filed certiorari and a writ of prohibition with a restraining order to stop the transfer of ₱89.9 billion in PhilHealth funds to the national budget. The petitioners challenged the constitutionality of Department of Finance Circular 003-2024. Secretary Ralph Recto defended the return of unused government subsidies to the national treasury, saying that the circular implements a congressional order under Section XLIII (1)(d) Republic Act No. 11975 (the General Appropriations Act 2024). In 2025, the DOH returned ₱60 billion in surplus funds to PhilHealth to strengthen its universal-healthcare program.
