= East Avenue Medical Center =

Government hospital in Quezon City, Philippines

- Department of Health

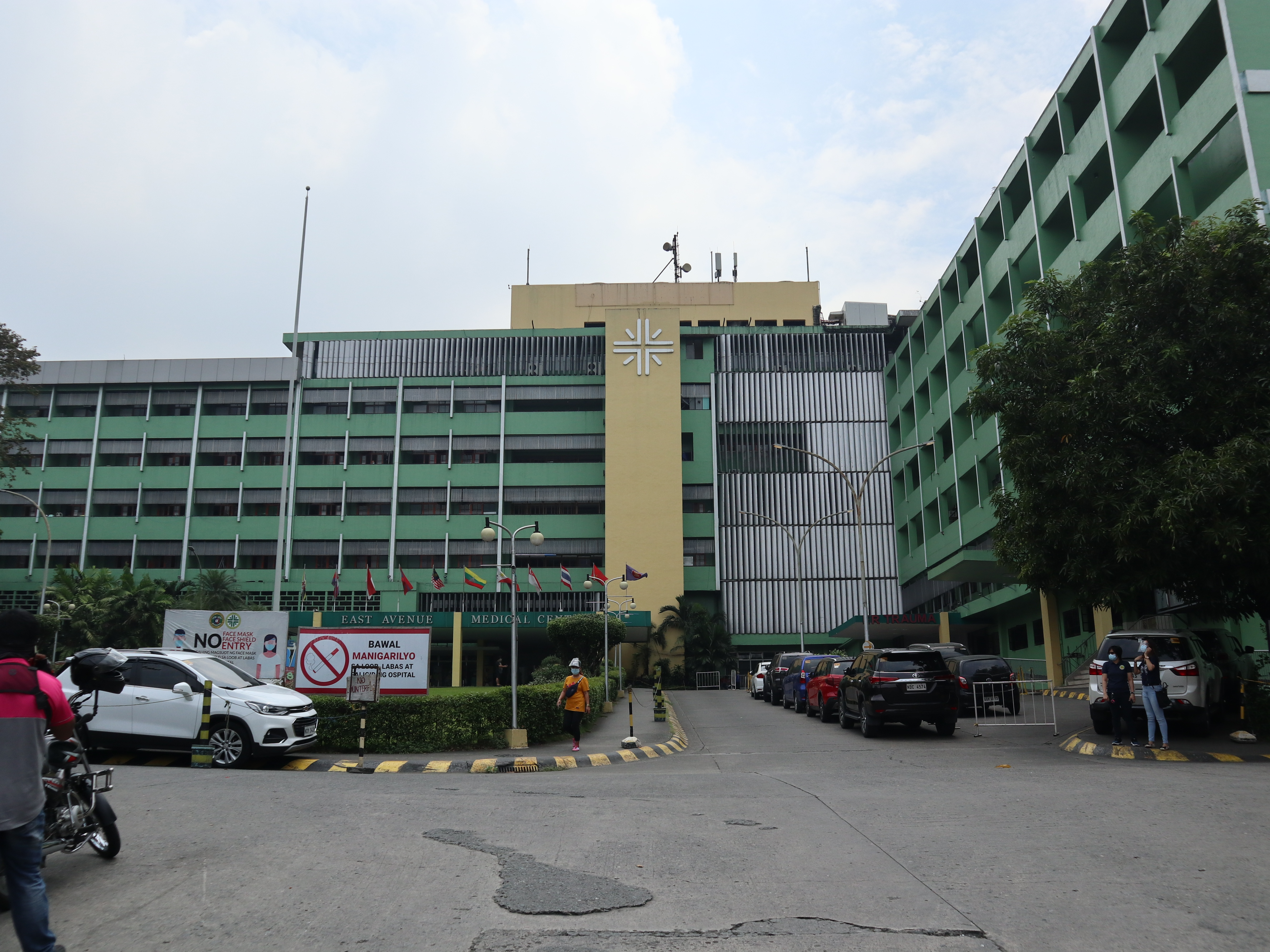
- Facade of the main building

- Location within Metro Manila Location within Luzon Location within Philippines

Geography
- Location: Quezon City, Metro Manila, Philippines
- Coordinates: 14°38′31″N 121°02′53″E

Organization
- Type: Tertiary

Services
- Emergency department: Yes
- Beds: 650

History
- Former name: Ospital ng Bagong Lipunan

Links
- Website: eamc.doh.gov.ph
- Lists: Hospitals in the Philippines

The East Avenue Medical Center (EAMC) is a government-owned tertiary general hospital located in Barangay Central, Quezon City, Philippines.

== History ==
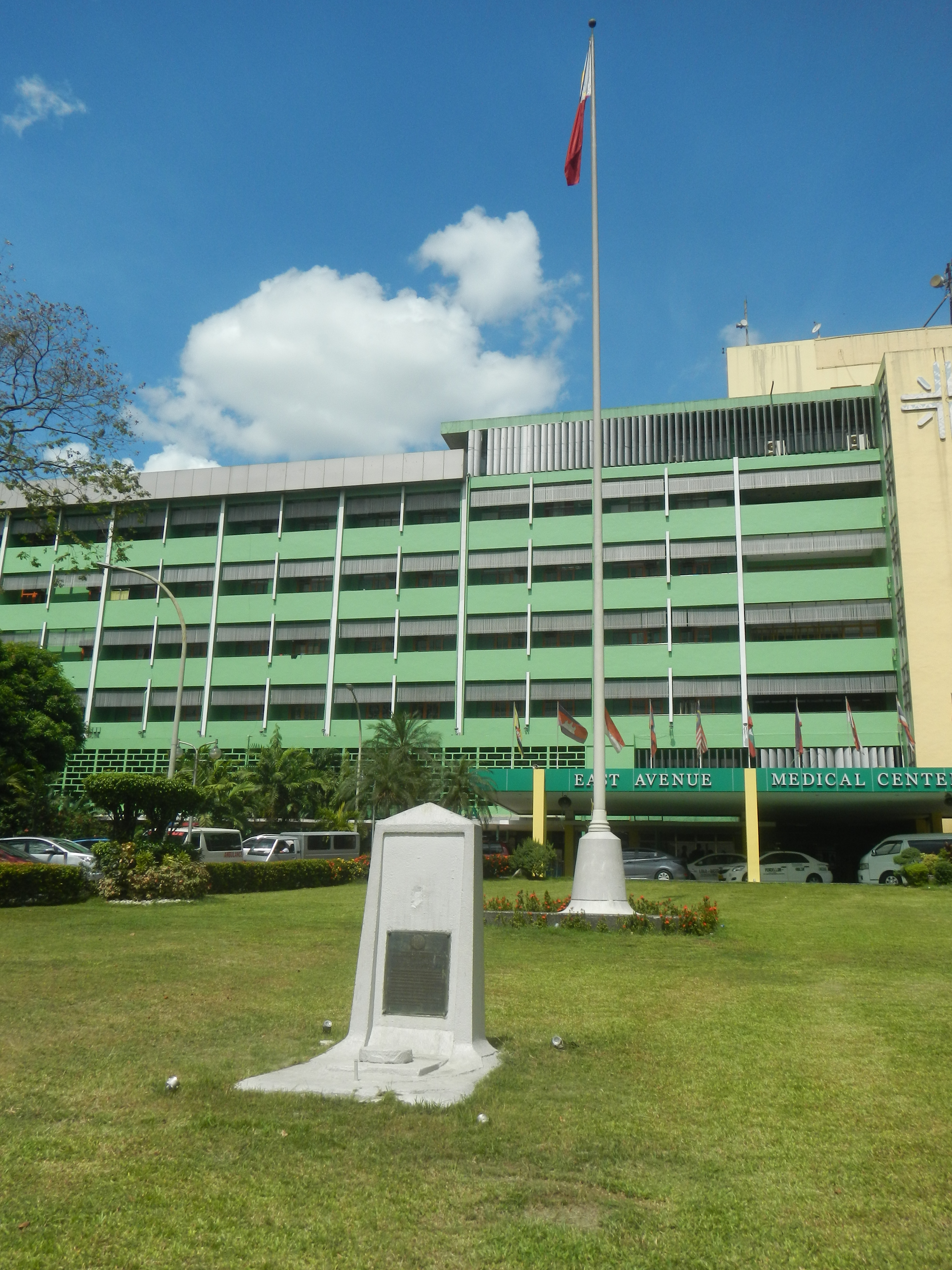
Facade and marker

The EAMC was established as the GSIS General Hospital under the Government Service Insurance System (GSIS) and was inaugurated by then President Ferdinand Marcos along with Imelda Marcos on October 8, 1969. The company operating the hospital, GSIS Hospital, Inc. was dissolved on June 9, 1978, in pursuant to Presidential Decree No. 1411 issued by President Marcos, and transferred all of the assets of the company to the Ministry of Health (now Department of Health) and the hospital was renamed Ospital ng Bagong Lipunan (transl. "New Society Hospital").

The hospital was renamed again on November 12, 1986, by then Executive Secretary Joker P. Arroyo by authority of then President Corazon Aquino, to its current name through Memorandum Order No. 48. The Republic Act No. 8345 signed on June 4, 1997, increased the authorized bed capacity of the hospital from 350 to 600. The allowed 600 bed capacity was fulfilled on August 17, 2020, when the new 250 bed capacity EAMC building was completed and inaugurated. It was used as a treatment facility during the COVID-19 pandemic. On June 24, 2021, EAMC, by virtue of Republic Act No. 11561, increased the authorized bed capacity from 600 to 1000 beds.
