= Philippine Orthopedic Center =

Government hospital in Quezon City, Philippines

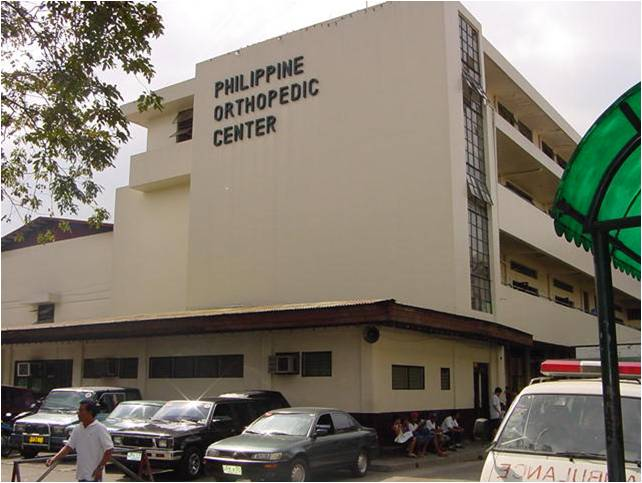
- Facade of the Philippine Orthopedic Center

- Location within Metro Manila Location within Luzon Location within Philippines

Geography
- Location: Quezon City, Metro Manila, Philippines
- Coordinates: 14°37′39″N 121°00′12″E

Services
- Emergency department: Yes
- Beds: 700

History
- Former names: Philippine Civil Affairs Unit No. 1; Mandaluyong Emergency Hospital; National Orthopedic Hospital; National Orthopedic Hospital and Rehabilitation Medical Center
- Founded: February 9, 1945; 81 years ago

Links
- Website: poc.doh.gov.ph
- Lists: Hospitals in the Philippines

The Philippine Orthopedic Center is a 700-bed tertiary special hospital under the Department of Health of the Philippines, specializing in the treatment of musculoskeletal disorders and serves as a center for trauma and orthopedics. The hospital is located at Banawe Avenue corner Maria Clara Street, Santa Mesa Heights, Quezon City.

== History ==
The Orthopedic Center was originally organized in Mandaluyong, Rizal by the American Army in 1945 as the Philippine Civil Affairs Unit (PCAU) No. 1, to take care of civilian casualties during the liberation of Manila and its suburbs. After it was turned over to the Philippine government, its functions were redirected to look after accident victims and orthopedic cases. Its name was later changed to Mandaluyong Emergency Hospital then, to National Orthopedic Hospital and Rehabilitation Medical Center.

In 1963, the hospital was relocated to Quezon City. Its authorized bed capacity was increased from 200 to 500 then to 700. The hospital through the hospital chief, Benjamin V. Tamesis, MD, pioneered the introduction of physical therapy and occupational therapy courses in the Philippines. Both courses were later absorbed by the University of the Philippines and was placed under the College of Medicine, then later became the School of Allied Medical Professions, now known as College of Allied Medical Professions.

In 1982, it was renamed National Orthopedic Hospital-Rehabilitation Medical Center, and again to Philippine Orthopedic Center in 1989, by virtue of Batas Pambansa No. 301 and Republic Act 6786, respectively.

== Services ==
The Philippine Orthopedic Center caters mainly to a patient clientele with orthopedic, musculoskeletal problems, and neuromuscular conditions. The center is also the major referral center for spinal injuries in the country.

The Medical Division consists of the Trauma Services, Adult Orthopedic Service, Children's Orthopedic service, Tumor Unit, Hand service and Spine Surgery service. The hospital also has the Anaesthesia department, Radiology Department, Rehabilitation Medicine Department, Laboratory Department, Specialty Service and Dental service.

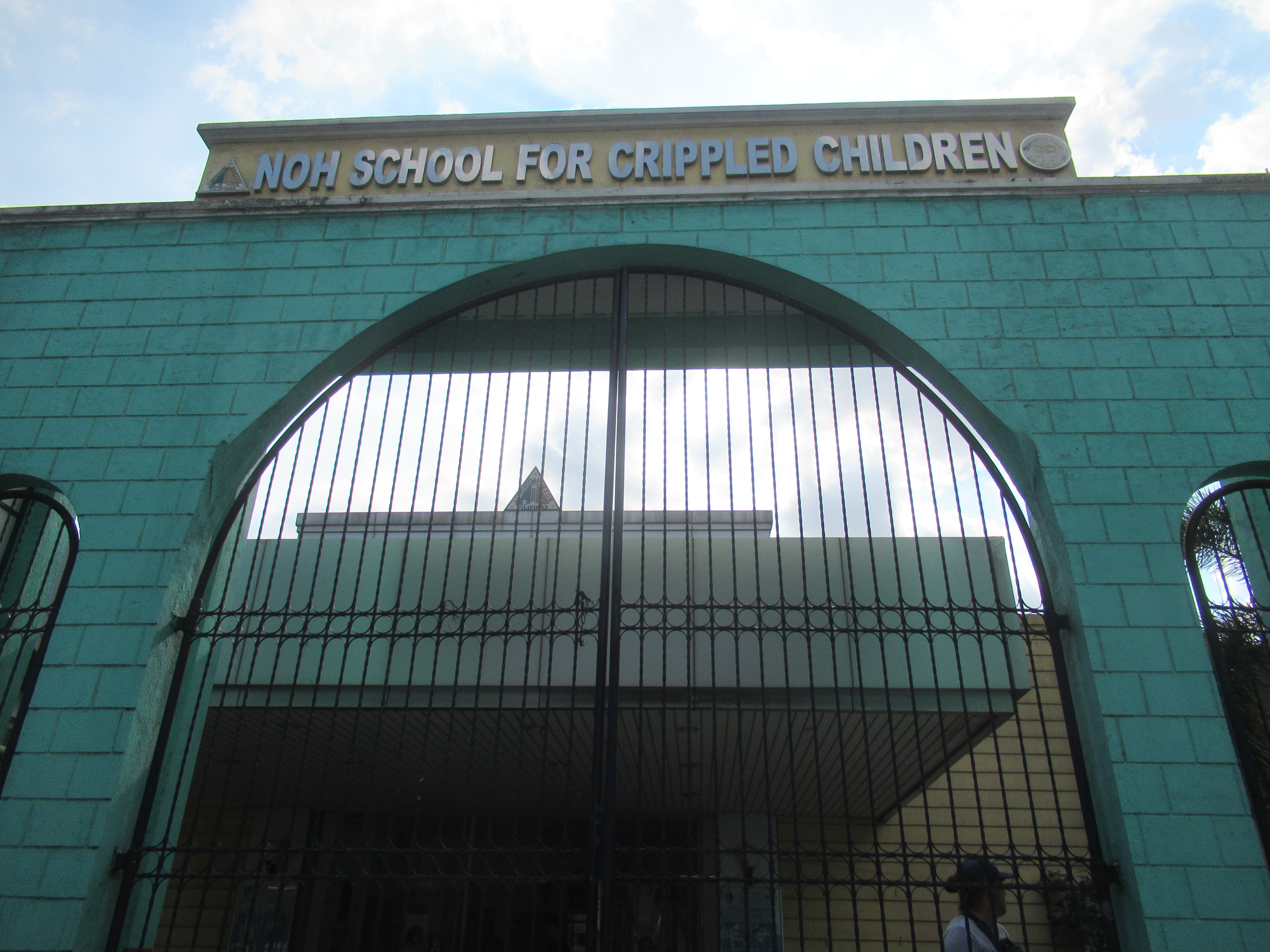
NOH School for Crippled Children

The Laboratory Department is divided into the Blood Bank, Anatomic Pathology Unit, and Clinical Pathology Unit.

Its Rehabilitation Medicine Department has the Medical Rehabilitation Service, Physical Therapy section, the Occupational Therapy Section, Psychology Section, Electrodiagnostics Unit, Neurology Service and the Prosthetics and Surgical Appliance Factory.

The specialty service includes general surgery, neurosurgery, urology, neurosurgery, internal medicine (pulmonary and cardiology) and diabetes care.

The Nursing Division comprises both the main nursing service and the nursing training service.

The Social service and Chaplaincy is being placed under the Administrative office.

== Training ==
Residency training for orthopedics, anaesthesia, and physical medicine and rehabilitation are recognized by the certifying boards of their specialties.

The hospital also provides a training ground for the physical therapy and occupational therapy students. Numerous radiologic technology interns, medical technology and nursing affiliates have been trained. the fourth year medical students (or medical clerks) have been exposed to various orthopedic and neuromuscular conditions.
