= Disability in the Philippines =

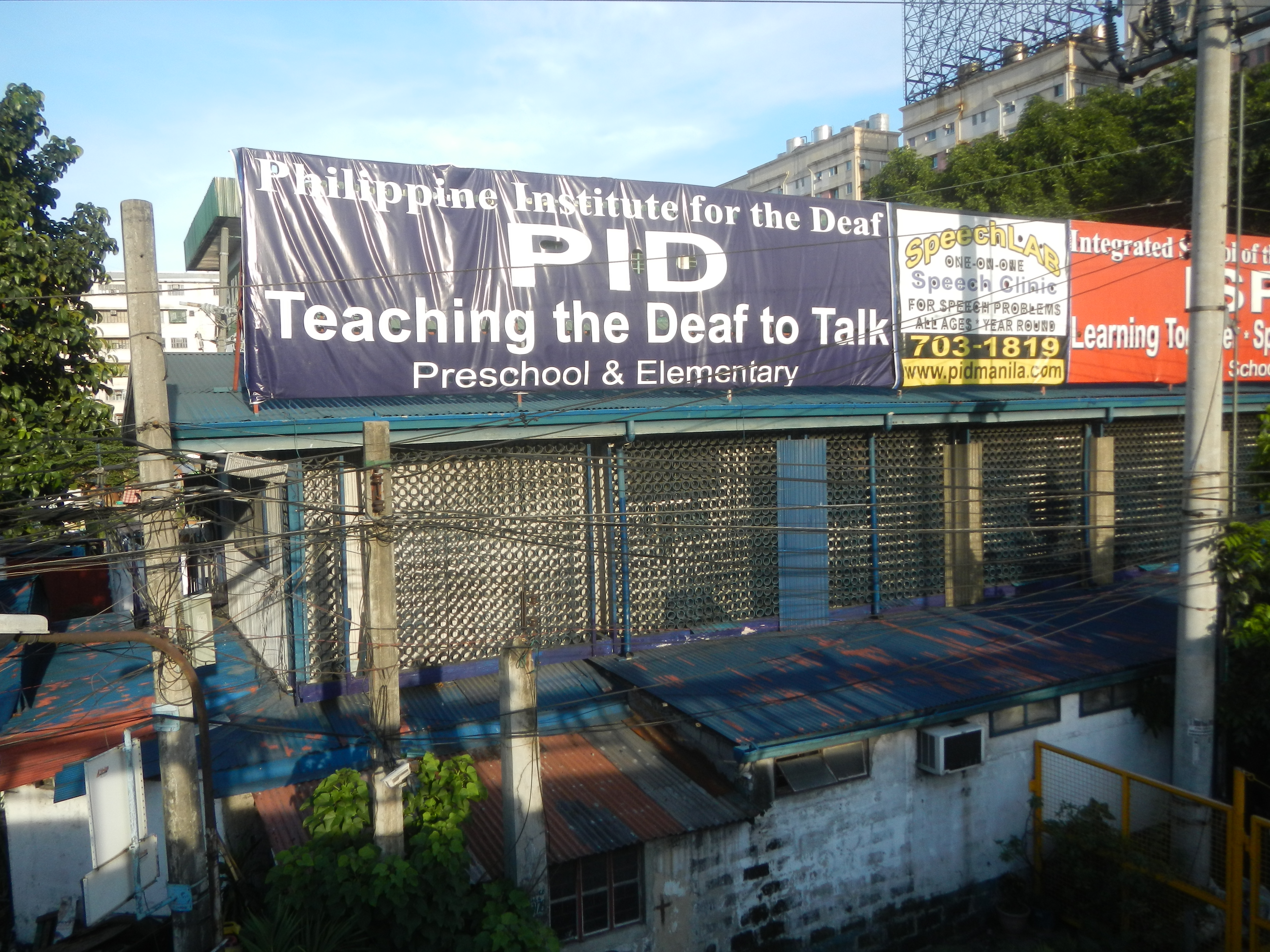
Advertisement in Metro Manila promoting services of an elementary school catering to deaf people.

In the Philippines, disability is one of the social issues affecting a portion of the Philippines' population. To ensure the equality and rights of disabled persons, there are Philippine laws and policies that were passed regarding persons with disabilities (PWDs). There are also numerous non-government associations that seeks to encourage and help improve the wellbeing of people with disabilities.

The National Council on Disability Affairs (NCDA), formerly National Council for the Welfare of Disabled Persons or NCWDP, is the government body which focuses on the activities, issues, and concerns that are related to PWDs in the country. Their priority is to track and perform laws to ensure the protection of PWDs' political and civil rights. They also handle the annual "International Day of Persons with Disabilities in the Philippines" held on December 3 to advocate the rights and privileges of PWDs.

== Legal definition ==
Section 4 of the Republic Act No. 7277 or the Magna Carta for Disabled Person lists the definition of Disability in the Philippines.

=== Disabled person ===
Disabled individuals in the Philippines are defined as individuals "suffering from restriction or different abilities, as a result of a mental, physical or sensory impairment, to perform an activity in the manner or within the range considered normal for a human being".

=== Impairment ===
Impairment is defined as "any loss, diminution or aberration of psychological, physiological, or anatomical structure of function."

=== Disability ===
Disability is defined as "(1) a physical or mental impairment that substantially limits one or more psychological, physiological or anatomical function of an individual or activities of such individual; (2) a record of such an impairment; or (3) being regarded as having such an impairment."

=== Handicap ===
Handicap is defined as "a disadvantage for a given individual resulting from an impairment or a disability, that limits or prevents the functions or activity, that is considered normal given the age and sex of the individual."

== Prevalence ==
The Philippine Statistics Authority recorded a total of 1.443 million people in the Philippines (1.57% of the total population) has disability as of 2010 and categorized them according to age group, gender, and region. In 2011, the Department of Social Welfare and Development made and published the results of the survey about Philippine households with PWDs with respect to their types of disability

The survey results are as shown below:

Household Population and Persons with Disability by Region, 2010
Region	Household Population (in 1,000)	Household Population with Disability (in 1,000)
Philippines	92,098	1,443
National Capital Region (NCR)	11,797	167
Cordillera Administrative Region (CAR)	1,612	26
Region I - Ilocos	4,743	78
Region II - Cagayan Valley	3,226	56
Region III - Central Luzon	10,118	139
Region IV-A - CALABARZON	12,583	193
Region IV-B - MIMAROPA	2,732	50
Region V - Bicol	5,412	100
Region VI - Western Visayas	7,090	138
Region VII - Central Visayas	6,785	109
Region VIII - Eastern Visayas	4,090	72
Region IX - Zamboanga Peninsula	3,398	46
Region X - Northern Mindanao	4,285	67
Region XI - Davao	4,453	71
Region XII - Soccsksargen	4,103	59
Autonomous Region in Muslim Mindanao (ARMM)	3,249	35
Region XIII - Caraga	2,425	38

Household Population with Disability by Broad Age Group and Sex, 2010
Age group	Persons with Disability (in 1,000) by Sex			Sex Ration
Age group	Total	Male	Female	Sex Ration
All Ages	1,443	734	709	104
0 - 14	272	149	123	121
15 - 49	578	312	266	117
50 - 64	274	141	133	103
65 years and over	319	132	187	70

Households with Disability by Disability Type, 2011
Household	Total	Percentage
Household Surveyed	4,446,649	100%
Household with PWDs	302,421	6.77%
Household with Hearing Loss	27,972	0.63%
Household with Vision Impairment	53,034	1.19%
Household with Speech Disability/Communication Disorder	28,259	0.63%
Household with Orthopedic Disaboloty	41,551	0.93%
Household with Intellectual/Learning Disability	28,610	0.64%
Household with Other types of disabilities	77,599	1.74%

== Non-government organizations ==
The National Council on Disability Affairs regulates a list of non-government organizations officially partnered with the government. There are 8 NGOs recognized by the NCDA that cater to Filipino PWDs on a national level. Local government units also keep track of local non-government agencies or associations that cater to PWDs. Every city or municipality maintains a PWD Affairs Office under the office of the City Mayor that facilitates the needs of its constituents in the area. Some cities like Baguio City have required all their barangays to maintain a PWD Desk or Committee in order to efficiently reach out to their PWD constituents.

== Government policies and legislation ==
The recognition of PWDs is stated in the 1987 Philippine Constitution. Article XIII, Section 13 states that "[t]he State shall establish a special agency for disabled person for their rehabilitation, self-development, and self-reliance, and their integration into the mainstream of society." The established agency was named the National Council on Disability Affairs or NCDA. Some of the laws concerning PWDs include Republic Act No 7277 (Magna Carta for Disabled Persons), Batas Pambansa Blg. 344 (Accessibility Law), Republic Act 6759 (White Cane Act) and ILO Convention No. 159 (Vocational Rehabilitation of Persons With Disability).

=== Republic Act No. 7277 ===
This law, the Magna Carta for Disabled Persons, is "an act providing for the rehabilitation, self-development and self-reliance of disabled persons and their integration into the mainstream of society and for other purposes." It outlines the rights and privileges of disabled persons and the prohibition on discrimination of PWDs. It was ratified on March 24, 1992.

=== Batas Pambansa Blg. 344 ===
The Accessibility Law is an act enhancing the mobility of disabled persons that requires buildings, institutions, establishments and public utilities to install some facilities and other devices. This law requires the installation of sidewalks, ramps and railings for the PWDs in public spaces. It was ratified on December 7, 1982.

=== Republic Act 6759 ===
The White Cane Act declares August 1 of every year as White Cane Safety Day in recognition of the visually impaired PWDs' need for assistance and as a reminder for the public of their duty to care for and respect them. The act was ratified on September 18, 1989.

=== Republic Act No. 10754 ===
The Republic Act No. 10754 is an expansion of the benefits and privileges of PWDs in the Philippines as an amendment to the Magna Carta for Disabled Persons. It highlights the basic and societal benefits and privileges of PWDs. It was signed on December 1, 2016.

=== Qualifications ===
Persons with Disability (PWD) are those who have long-term physical, mental, intellectual or sensory impairments which in interaction with various barriers may hinder their full and effective participation in society on an equal basis with others. Identification Cards shall be issued to any PWD with permanent disabilities due to any one or more of the following conditions: psychosocial, chronic illness, learning, mental, visual, orthopedic, speech and hearing conditions. This includes persons with disabling diseases resulting to the person's limitations to do day-to-day activities as normally as possible such as but not limited to those undergoing dialysis, heart disorders, severe cancer cases and such other similar cases resulting to temporary or permanent disability.

=== Benefits ===
Under R.A. 10754, the benefits of persons with disabilities (PWDs) are the following:

1. 20% Discount and Value Added Tax Exemption on the purchase of certain goods and services such as Lodging Establishments, Restaurants, Recreation Centers, Purchase of Medicines and Foods for Special Medical Purposes, Medical and Dental Services, Diagnostic and Laboratory Fees and Professional Fees of Attending Doctors, Domestic Air and Sea Travel, Land Transportation Travel, Funeral and Burial Services for the Death of a PWD
2. Educational Assistance
3. Benefits from GSIS, SSS and Pag-Ibig based on their respective charters
4. Special Discounts in Special Programs
5. Express Lanes

=== Tax benefits ===
The Bureau of Internal Revenue provides tax benefits and privileges to qualified persons with disability (PWD) as well as their benefactor or someone who cares and lives with the PWD under Revenue Regulations 5–2017. The BIR already provides tax benefits as early as 2009 through RR 1–2009.

The beneficiaries of BIR's regulation entitles PWD and their benefactors to at least 20 percent discount on the sale of select goods and services. RR 5-2017 specifically stated that benefactors regardless of citizenship must have fourth civil degree of consanguinity or affinity with the PWD while the previous regulation, RR 1-2009 did not have this restriction.

== Education ==
The RA 7277 ensures that Persons with Disabilities (PWDs) have adequate access and opportunities to quality education. Under this Magna Carta for Disabled Persons, it is unlawful for any learning institution "to deny a disabled person admission to any course it offers by reason of handicap or disability." In formulating educational policies and programs, the State should take into consideration special needs or requirements for PWDs, and it shall also encourage learning institutions to do the same. Financial assistance such as scholarships, student loan programs, subsidies, and other incentives are also granted by the State to "economically marginalized but deserving disabled students pursuing post secondary or tertiary education" in both public and private schools. At least five percent of the allocation of the Private Education Student Financial Assistance Program is set aside for students studying vocational and technical degree courses.

Implementation of the Special Education program is also funded by the National Government, which shall ensure a complete, adequate, and integrated system of the program for disabled persons.

=== Special education ===
The Department of Education (DepEd) currently recognizes 648 Special Education (SPED) centers and regular schools in the Philippines offering the SPED program. Out of the 648, 471 cater to elementary students while 177 cater to High School students. Among the government or public special schools are Jose Fabella Memorial School, NOH – School for Crippled Children, Philippine National School for the Blind, and Philippine School for the Deaf. The SPED program offered by DepEd caters to learners with visual impairment, intellectual disability, learning disability, autism spectrum disorder, communication disorder, physical disability, emotional and behavioral disorder, multiple disability with visual impairment, and those who are orthopedically disabled, chronically ill, and gifted and talented.

A SPED program may include a Self-contained/Special Class which is a separate class for one type of exceptionality, Itinerant Teaching or where a teacher provides direct consultations with the student at home or at school, or Inclusion wherein all children with different types of disabilities are taught together in one classroom. Enrolling a child with disability into a regular class may also be done through what is called Mainstreaming or Integration. Under Partial Integration, a student in a special needs class joins regular students in non-academic activities such as physical education, arts programs, and work education. If qualified, the student can eventually join in regular academic subjects. On the other hand, a child with special needs going through Full Integration takes part in both regular academic and non-academic classes.

For universities and colleges, the National Council on Disability Affairs maintains a list of institutions which accept students with disabilities.

University of the Philippines (UP) also has a special UP College Admission Test (UPCAT) which accommodates PWDs who wish to take the examination by providing materials such as a Braille test booklet and even sign language interpreters as well. Students with disabilities may take the exam under the circumstance that they pass the cut-off grade set by each campus.

== Equal employment ==
There are government policies that aims to promote the equal opportunity for employment of PWDs. Republic Act (RA) No. 10524 and Implementing Rules and Regulations (IRR) of RA 10524 ensures that a qualified employee with disability shall have the same terms and conditions of employment and the same compensation, privileges, benefits, fringe benefits, incentives or allowances as a qualified non-disabled person. Also, person with disability shall not be discriminated on the basis of disability that involves matters concerning all forms of employment, including conditions of recruitment, hiring and employment, continuance of employment, career advancement, and safe and healthy working conditions. To ensure that PWDs also get an opportunity in government agencies, offices, or corporal ions, one percent (1%) of all positions are reserved for persons with persons with disability and private corporations with more than a hundred (100) employees are encouraged to reserve at least one percent (1%) of all positions for PWDs. In accordance to this, the welfare of the PWDs must also be upheld and must not create or impose any burden on the PWD being employed. Republic Act No. 1179 is an act that aims to help the blind and other PWDs in terms of employment. Through the establishment of the Vocational Rehabilitation Office, provides vocational rehabilitation services to PWDs to prepare them for suitable employment by adopting and maintaining the Vocational Rehabilitation Plan to facilitate the rehabilitation of disable individuals including the census and placement of employment opportunities.

There are also studies about the employment of PWDs. In one study on the employment of PWDs in selected regions of the Philippines, most PWDs are being employed by private institutions, particularly PWD institutions that provide training and equip PWDs with necessary skills for jobs. Among these institutions are Vibes massage clinics, owned and managed by blind massage therapists and Tahanang Walang Hagdan, a rehabilitation center for physically impaired individuals. Tahanang Walang Hagdan provides projects wherein they have a metal craft workshop and manufactures wheelchairs, educational toys, bags, and other novelty items. However, there are also companies that include hiring PWDs in their Corporate Social Responsibilities (CSR) like the Lamoiyan Corporation in Parañaque and economic zones like the Clark Development Corporation (CDC). The Asia Foundation's Fully Abled Nation (FAN) program through the partnership of The Australian Embassy and The Asia Foundation in the Philippines also created a campaign, "May 1% Ka Ba" whose goal is to improve the employment percentage of PWDs through the promotion of inclusive employment in accordance to RA 10524.

In September 2015, United Nations (UN) set the Sustainable Development Goals (SDG) as a set of goals to be accomplished by the year 2030 and Philippines is one among the 149 countries that are participating in this global call of action. The SDGs aim to build on the work of the previous Millennium Development Goals (MDG) in order to address poverty, inequality and climate change. SDG Goal 8: Decent Work and Economic Growth aims to promote the equal employment for all. The goal is by 2030, everyone including young people and persons with disabilities achieve full and productive employment as well as an equal pay for work of equal value.

=== Employment incentives ===
RA 10524 and its IRR aims to provide equal work opportunities to PWDs, promote rehabilitation, self-development, self-reliance and affirmation of PWDs as productive members of society while providing benefits for the private sector. Private corporations that employ PWDs receive an additional deduction of 25% from the private corporation's gross income of the total amount paid as salaries and wages to PWDs. In order to receive this deduction they must submit a proof of employing PWDs registered in the Department of Labor and Employment (DOLE) and Department of Health (DOH). There is also an additional deduction from their net income if their modified facilities cater to PWDs given that these modifications are separate from the requirement of Batas Pambansa (BP) Blg, 344, or the Act to Enhance the Mobility of Disabled Persons.

== Sports ==
Disabled sports or parasports in the Philippines are handled by the Philippine Paralympic Committee (PPC, previously the Philippine Sports Association for the Differently Abled—National Paralympic Committee of the Philippines or PHILSPADA—NPC). The country boasts a men's national wheelchair basketball team which has competed in tournaments around Asia. The country has also participated in the Summer Paralympic Games since 1988. The first medal of the country in the Games was a bronze by weightlifter, Adeline Dumapong who competed at the 2000 Summer Paralympics in the women’s up-to‑82.5 kg powerlifting event, lifting 110 kg.

== See also ==
- Deafness in the Philippines
