= José Fabella =

Filipino physician and public health advocate

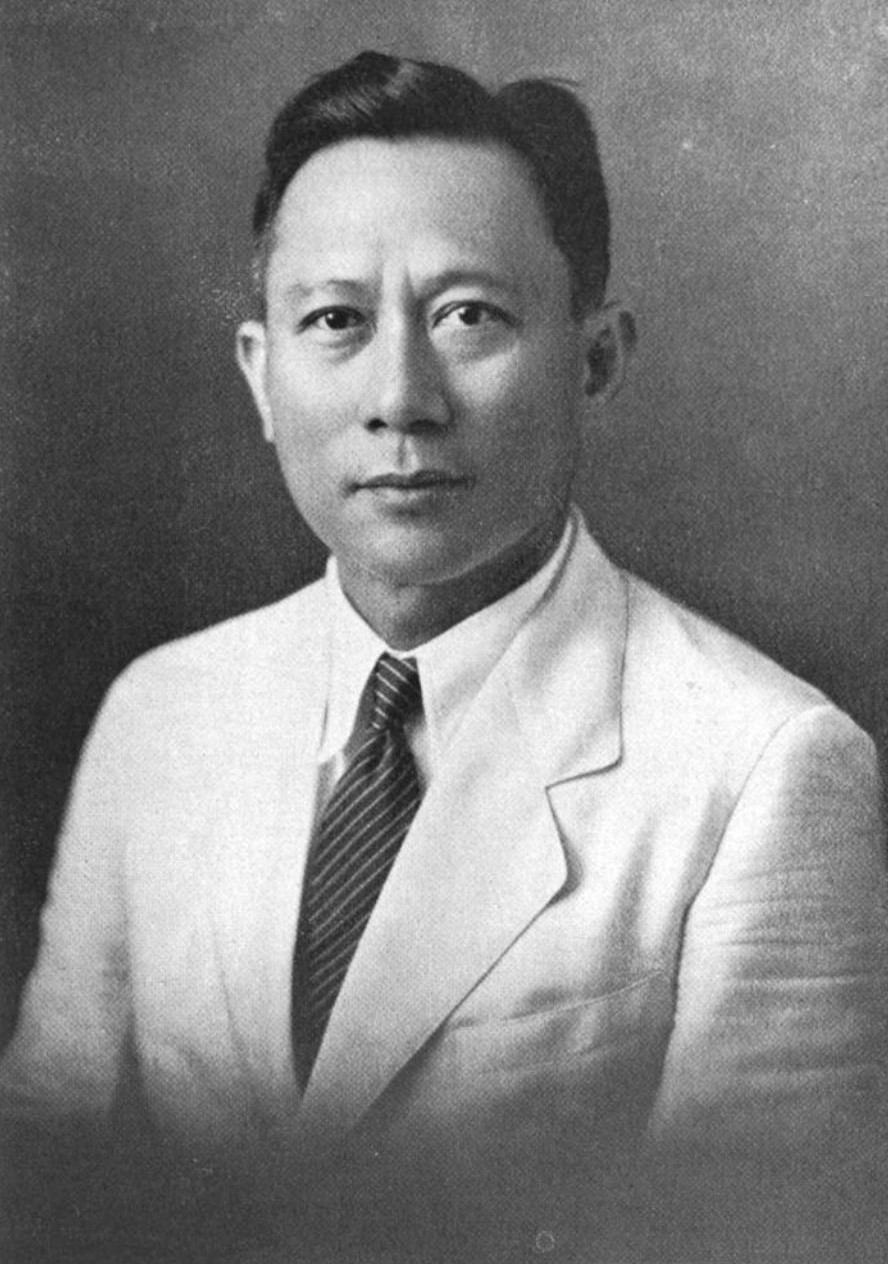
- Fabella, c. 1941

Commissioner of Public Welfare
- In office November 15, 1921 – November 15, 1935
- Preceded by: Position established
- Succeeded by: Juan Nolasco (as Secretary of Public Instruction, Health, and Public Welfare)

Personal details
- Born: José Fernández Fabella; October 26, 1888 Pagsanjan, Laguna, Captaincy General of the Philippines
- Died: January 16, 1945 (aged 56) Manila, Philippine Commonwealth
- Spouse: Esperanza Barcelo
- Children: Jose Fabella, Jr. Juan Fabella; Esperanza Fabella; Evelyn Fabella; Jaime Fabella; Erlinda Fabella
- Parent(s): Juan Fabella (father); Damiana Fernandez (mother)
- Relatives: Patis Tesoro (granddaughter)
- Education: Philippine Normal College; Rush Medical College

José Fernández Fabella (October 26, 1888 – January 16, 1945) was a Filipino physician and a public health advocate described in a biography as the "father of public health and social welfare in the Philippines."

== Early life and education ==
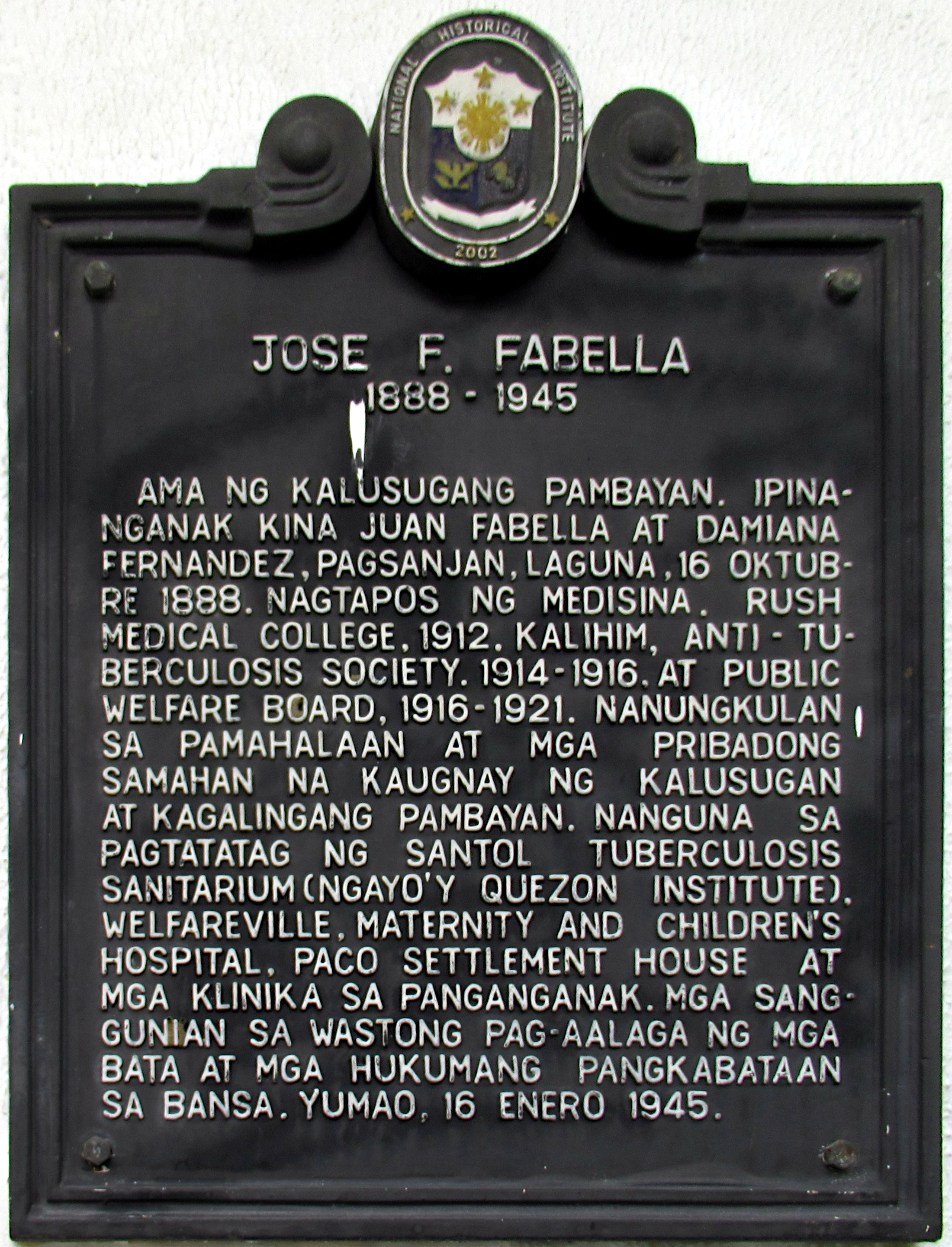
Historical marker of Jose Fabella in Rizal Ave., Santa Cruz, Manila issued in 2002.

Jose Fabella was born in Pagsanjan, Laguna to Juan Lavadia Fabella and Damiana Cabarrubias Fernandez. He finished his primary education at Liceo de Manila in Intramuros and his secondary education at Ateneo de Manila. Then, he enrolled at the Philippine Normal College for a preparatory course in medicine. He went to the United States and studied at Rush Medical College, formerly affiliated with the University of Chicago, where he obtained his medical degree in 1912. He worked as an intern, and later, as resident physician at Children's Free Hospital in Milwaukee, Wisconsin. He took postgraduate courses in infant and children's diseases at Charité Krankenhaus in Berlin, Germany in 1914 and at the New York Post Graduate Medical School in 1920.

== Medical career ==
On his return to the Philippines, Fabella was appointed to various government positions. From 1914 to 1916, he was appointed secretary of the Philippine Islands Anti-Tuberculosis Society. He also served as the first secretary, and later as executive director of the Public Welfare Board from 1914 to 1921 and Public Welfare Commissioner before he became the first chief of Bureau of Health in 1936 and first secretary of Department of Health and Public Welfare in 1941. During his stint in government, he initiated the coordination and regulations of various welfare services including operation of puericulture centers. In 1922, he opened a midwifery training school in Sta. Cruz, Manila which was the progenitor of Maternity and Children's Hospital which is now the Dr. Jose Fabella Memorial Hospital. He also initiated the development of a children's village called Welfareville in Mandaluyong, Province of Rizal where the government's child-caring institutions were established. The first child health surveys and studies of Filipino diet were conducted under his leadership.

He served as a member of the Philippine Board of Censorship for Motion Picture and the Tuberculosis Commission, first vice president of the Philippine Islands Anti-Tuberculosis Society, director of Philippine Islands Anti-Leprosy Society, vice president of Associated Charities and councilor of La Proteccion de la Infancia.

In recognition of his contributions to public health and social welfare, he was appointed delegate of the Philippines to the Second Oriental Conference of the League of Red Cross Societies held in Tokyo, Japan in 1926. He also represented the Philippines in the Seventh Congress of Tropical Medicine held in Calcutta, India in 1927 and in the International Tuberculosis Congress held in Oslo, Norway in 1930.

He was also a member of the Wack-Wack Golf Club, Philippine Columbian Association and Colegio Medico-Farmaceutico.

In 1942, at the beginning of Japanese occupation of the Philippines, Fabella was one of only three prominent Filipinos who refused to serve in the Japanese-sponsored Philippine Executive Commission to help administer the country. As a consequence, the Japanese authorities put him under house arrest.

== Personal life ==
Fabella was married to Esperanza Barcelo of Jaro, Iloilo, with whom he had six children: Jose Jr., Juan, Esperanza, Evelyn, Jaime and Erlinda.

One of her grandchildren is Patis Tesoro, a Filipino fashion designer and textile artist, who was declared a National Artist of the Philippines for Fashion Design.

He was the brother of Vicente F. Fabella, considered as the first Filipino certified public accountant, and founder of Jose Rizal University.

== Legacy ==
In honor of Fabella and his contributions in the field of public health and social welfare, various government institutions and a public road were named after him:

- Dr. Jose Fabella Memorial Hospital, the National Maternity Hospital, a tertiary newborn hospital in Santa Cruz, Manila recognized by the World Health Organization-Western Pacific Region Office as a role model "for its newborn care programs which have been proven to reduce infant morbidity and mortality."
- Dr. Jose Fabella Memorial Hospital School of Midwifery, a training school for midwifery in Santa Cruz, Manila established in 1922.
- Jose Fabella Memorial School, a public special school located in Welfareville Compound, Mandaluyong established in 1925
- Jose Fabella Center, an institutional care facility located in Correctional Road, Mandaluyong that provides temporary shelter to strandees, transients, vagrants and mendicants.
- Dr. Jose Fabella Road, a two-lane undivided street circumventing portions of the Welfareville Compound, Mandaluyong.
