= Philippine Normal University =

Public university in the Philippines

- Pamantasang Normal ng Pilipinas (Filipino)
- Former names: Philippine Normal School (1901–1949); Philippine Normal College (1949–1991)
- Motto: Truth. Excellence. Service.
- Type: Public Nonsectarian Research higher education institution
- Established: January 21, 1901 (125 years and 64 days)
- Accreditation: AACCUP
- Academic affiliations: ASAIHL; AUAP; AsTEN; AUPF; CAPEU; PASUC; APNIEVE; 3NS; SMIIC
- Budget: ₱1,563,269,000 (2026)
- Chairman: Shirley Agrupis
- President: Bert J. Tuga
- Vice-president: Marilyn U. Balagtas (academics)
- Academic staff: 334 (all campuses, 2020)
- Administrative staff: 304 (all campuses, 2020)
- Location: Manila, Philippines (main campus); 14°35′16″N 120°58′59″E
- Campus: Urban Main: Ermita, Manila 3.7 hectares (37,000 m^{2}) Satellite: North Luzon (Alicia, Isabela) 5 hectares (50,000 m^{2}); South Luzon (Lopez, Quezon); Visayas (Cadiz, Negros Occidental); Mindanao (Prosperidad, Agusan del Sur) 15.4 hectares (154,000 m^{2})
- University Hymn: O, Alma Mater Ko (Hail, Alma Mater! Hail!)
- Colors: Royal blue & gold
- Sporting affiliations: SCUAA-NCR
- Website: www.pnu.edu.ph

The Philippine Normal University (PNU; Filipino: Pamantasang Normal ng Pilipinas) is a public coeducational teacher education and research university in the Philippines. It was established in 1901 through Act No. 74 of the Philippine Commission "for the education of natives of the Islands in the science of teaching". It has campuses in Manila, North Luzon, South Luzon, Visayas, and Mindanao. Pursuant to Republic Act No. 9647, it is the country's National Center for Teacher Education.

In addition to the powers and functions provided for in its charter, the university is mandated to conduct researches, build and develop a database of education policies, and provide technical support to the Department of Education and the Commission on Higher Education, as well as assistance to the Congress of the Philippines, in the design and analysis of programs, projects, and legislative proposals concerning teacher training, teacher education, continuing professional education of teachers and academic supervisors, teacher education curricula, and other issues affecting teacher education.

== History ==
=== Early history ===
The Philippine Normal University was originally established as the Philippine Normal School (PNS), an institution for the training of teachers, by virtue of Act No. 74 of the Philippine Commission enacted on January 21, 1901. It opened on September 1, 1901, on the site of a former Spanish normal school in the Escuela Municipal in Intramuros.

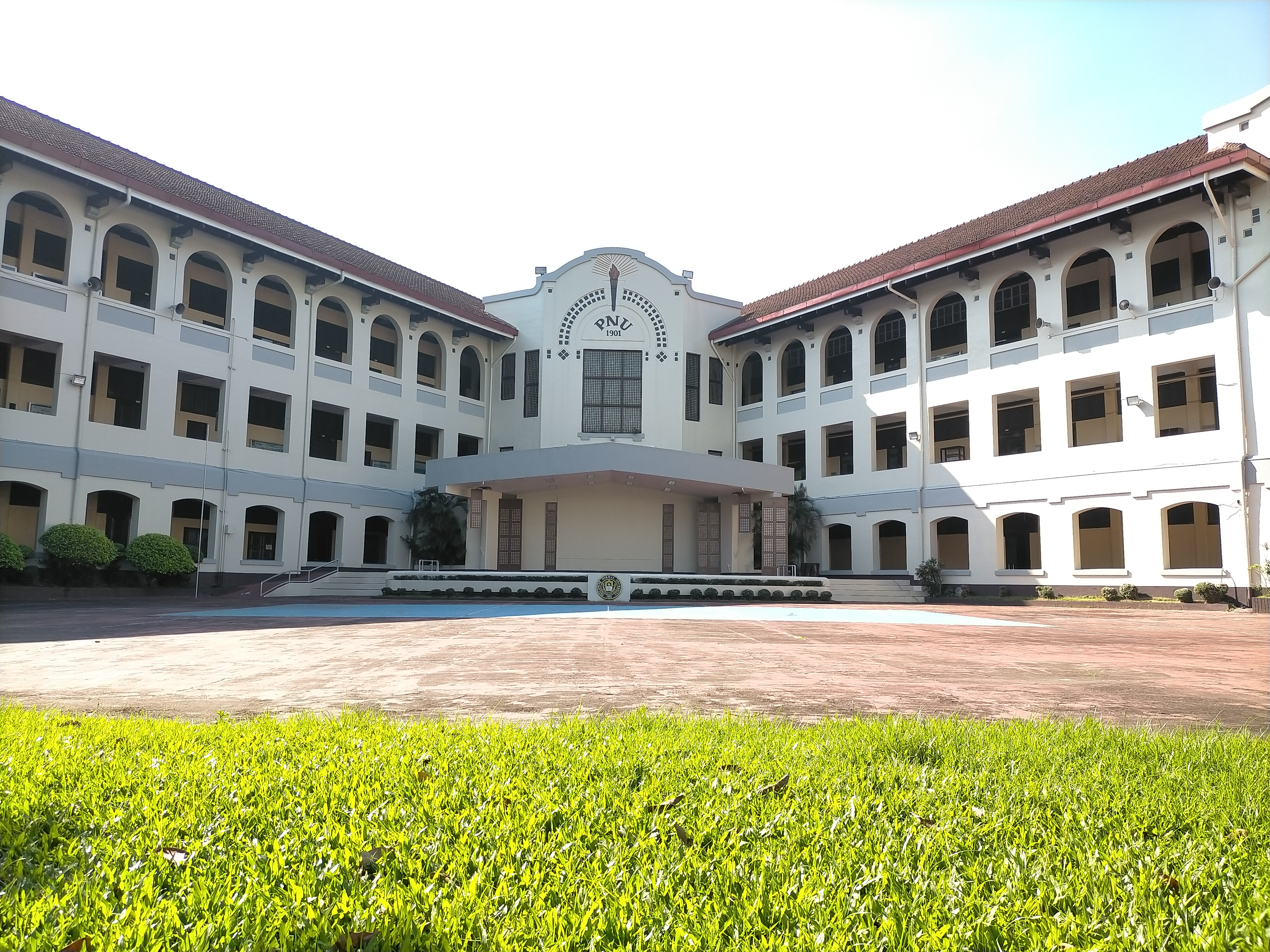
The main building of the Philippine Normal University Manila (renamed Geronima T. Pecson Hall in early 2000s) was built in 1912.

Provincial normal schools were also established in different parts of the country as branches of the PNS such as the Cebu Normal School (1902), Iloilo Normal School (1902; present-day West Visayas State University and Iloilo National High School), Zamboanga Normal School (1904), and an experimental vacation school in Laoag (1917) that became the North Luzon State College in 1976 (which was merged with the Mariano Marcos Memorial College of Science and Technology to form the Mariano Marcos State University in 1978).

For more than two decades, PNS offered a two-year general secondary education program. In 1928 it became a junior college offering a two-year program to graduates of secondary schools.

In 1944, during World War II, the PNS building (now Geronima T. Pecson Hall) housed the National Library of the Philippines after the Legislative Building (now the National Museum of Fine Arts) was occupied by Japanese soldiers. However, after two weeks, the PNS building was also occupied and some of the collections were moved to the Manila City Hall. The war-damaged school buildings were reconstructed under the Philippine Rehabilitation Act of 1946.

=== Conversion into college ===
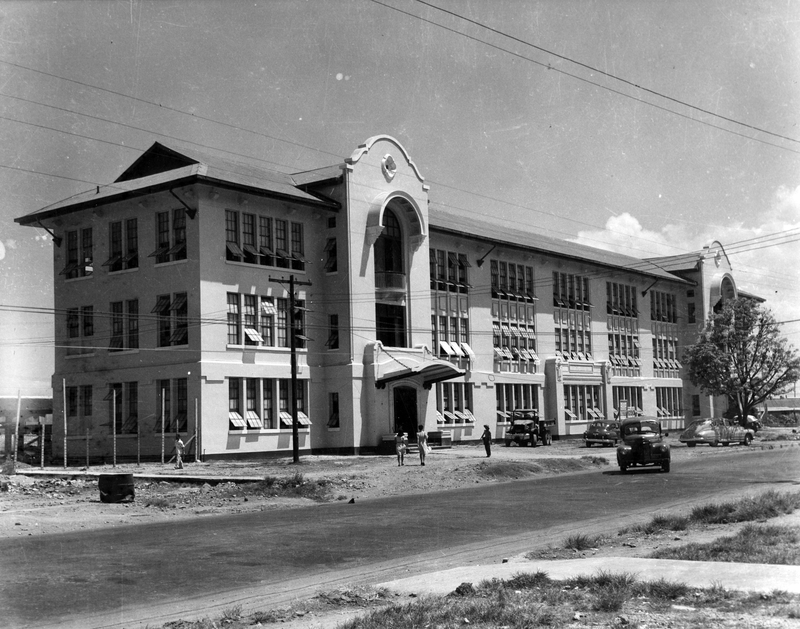
The reconstructed Training Department Building (now the PNU Manila Faculty Center) in 1950

When PNS was converted into the Philippine Normal College (PNC) in 1949 through Republic Act No. 416 (also known as the PNC Charter), the four-year Bachelor of Science in Elementary Education (BSEE) program was introduced. Subsequently, other undergraduate programs started, such as the Bachelor of Science in Education (BSE) with specialization in Elementary Education; a BSEE major in Home Economics; and a three-year Combined Home Economics diploma.

In 1953, the Graduate School was established. PNC included the Master of Arts (MA) in Education curriculum in the academic program. The organization of a full-fledged Graduate School came five years later.

PNC established branches in Negros Occidental, Agusan del Sur, and Isabela by virtue of Republic Act No. 4242 of 1965. The law also called for the establishment of branches in the Jolo-Tawi-Tawi area and Marinduque but it was not realized.

In 1970 the Bachelor of Science in Education curriculum, offering major and minor subjects, was introduced. The passage of Republic Act No. 6515 in July 1972, which amended Republic Act No. 416, paved the way for the offering of the Doctor of Education (Ed.D.) and the Doctor of Philosophy (Ph.D.) degrees and the provision of other academic programs relevant to the in-service training of teachers, school supervisors, administrators, researchers, and other education specialists and personnel.

Aside from the creation of campuses, the college expanded its services, most significant of which was its designation as the Curriculum Development Center for Communication Arts (English and Filipino) under the Language Study Center-Educational Development Projects Implementing Task Force (LSC-EDPITAF) Project and afterward as Center of Excellence (CENTREX) in English, Filipino and Values Education. Its major functions included the development of English and Filipino textbooks and teacher manuals for use in public elementary and secondary schools nationwide, and the conduct of national level trainers-training programs for the Bureau of Secondary Education, Department of Education, Culture and Sports, and the Fund for Assistance to Private Education.

=== University status ===
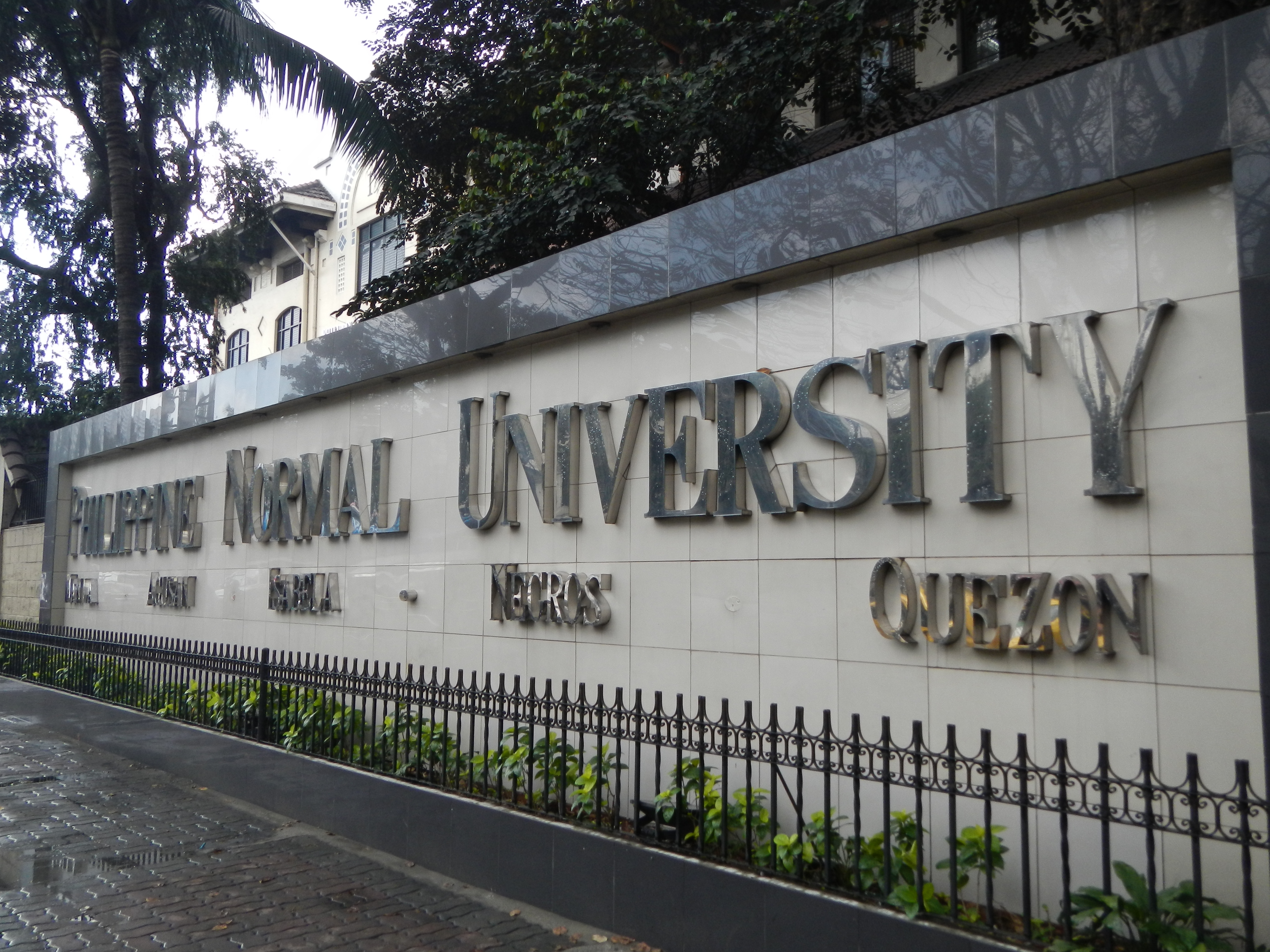
The welcome marker of the Philippine Normal University in Manila

The school was elevated to university status on December 26, 1991, by Republic Act No. 7168.

A fourth campus was constructed in Quezon province in 1993. The university was designated as Center of Excellence in Teacher Education (COE) for the National Capital Region and Center of Excellence in Filipino at the national level.

On September 1, 2001, the university celebrated its centennial founding anniversary.

In 2008, it was declared as the country's National Center for Teacher Education by virtue of Republic Act No. 9647.

In 2011, PNU convened a group of state universities that were founded as normal schools during the American period – Bicol University, Bukidnon State University, Cebu Normal University, Leyte Normal University, Mariano Marcos State University, Palawan State University, Pangasinan State University, West Visayas State University, and Western Mindanao State University – to establish the National Network of Normal Schools (3NS). The group aims to promote collaboration and cooperation in research, professional development, extension, and a local student Erasmus Mundus program.

In 2014, PNU, together with other teacher education institutions in Southeast Asia, established the Association of Southeast Asian Teacher Education Network (AsTEN) which became an entity associated with ASEAN on March 29, 2021. The current members of the organization include Seri Begawan Religious Teachers University College, the National Institute of Education (Cambodia), Indonesia University of Education, National University of Laos, Sultan Idris Education University, Yangon University of Education, the National Institute of Education of the Nanyang Technological University, Kasetsart University, and the University of Social Sciences and Humanities (Vietnam).

== Campuses ==
Location of the five campuses

The university has five campuses. The flagship and oldest campus is in Manila while the four non-autonomous branches are in different parts of the country.

Republic Act No. 4242, approved on June 19, 1965, established the North Luzon (Isabela), Visayas (Cadiz), and Mindanao (Agusan) branches. The South Luzon (Lopez) branch started through a consortium with the Polytechnic University of the Philippines in 1980.

In 2012, the regional branches were designated as university hubs for specific advocacies in response to regional demands and were later renamed in 2014.

As of May 2018, three campuses are recognized by the Commission on Higher Education as Centers of Excellence in Teacher Education.

Campus	Location	Opened	Designation
Manila	Manila	1901	Main Campus; Center of Excellence in Teacher Education
North Luzon	Alicia, Isabela	1971	Indigenous Peoples Education Hub; Center of Excellence in Teacher Education
South Luzon	Lopez, Quezon	1980	Technology and Livelihood Education and Technical and Vocational Education and Training Hub
Visayas	Cadiz, Negros Occidental	1968	Environment and Green Technology Education Hub
Mindanao	Prosperidad, Agusan del Sur	1968	Multicultural and Peace Education Hub; Center of Excellence in Teacher Education

=== PNU Manila ===
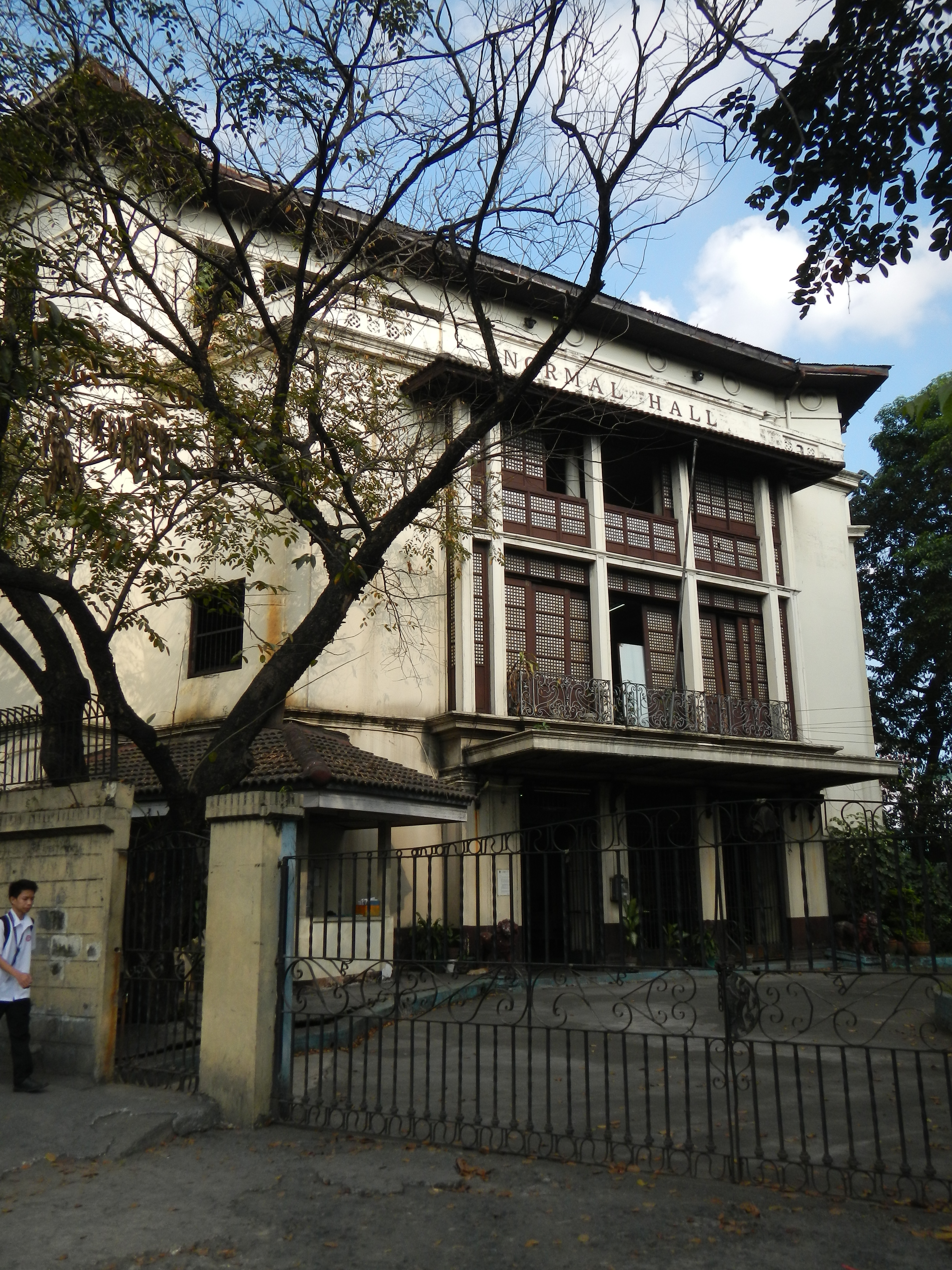
Normal Hall, the main student dormitory of PNU Manila built in 1914

PNS first occupied the building of the Escuela Municipal in Intramuros then moved to the old Exposition Grounds in Ermita, now occupied by the Philippine General Hospital, after a year. In 1912, it transferred to its present location at the corner of Taft Avenue and Ayala Boulevard.

The campus occupies a 3.7-hectare lot in Ermita, the civic center of Manila. Within its vicinity are the Manila City Hall, SM City Manila, the main campus of the Technological University of the Philippines, Rizal Park, the National Museum of Anthropology, and the National Museum of Fine Arts.

Its two oldest buildings, the Geronima T. Pecson Hall (now the main building) and Normal Hall, were designed by American architect William E. Parsons using the California Mission style. The construction was then budgeted at ₱374,000. The main building was built in 1912 and was originally called the Philippine Normal School Building. The Normal Hall, meanwhile, was constructed in 1914 and served as a student dormitory. In addition, the university's Faculty Center was the former Training Department Building, reconstructed in 1950 and used as a training center for teachers.

These 3 buildings were declared National Cultural Treasures by the National Museum of the Philippines in 2018.

=== PNU North Luzon ===
PNU North Luzon (formerly known as PNU Alicia or PNU Isabela) is the third regional branch of the university established by Republic Act No. 4242, principally authored by then-Isabela Lone District Representative Delfin Albano.

The branch was housed at the Home Economics Building of Alicia Central School when it opened on July 26, 1971. After a year, it moved to its present 5-hectare site in Brgy. Aurora donated by Rev. Cornelio Tomas of the United Church of Christ in the Philippines and by the Abuan family.

=== PNU South Luzon ===
The campus started through a consortium program in Teacher Education with a then-emerging campus of PUP (now the Lopez branch of the Polytechnic University of the Philippines). When the consortium agreement expired in 1993, a memorandum of agreement was signed by PNC, the provincial government of Quezon, the municipal government of Lopez, and the then Department of Education, Culture and Sports (now the Department of Education), to continue the operation of the PNU Teacher Education Program.

The branch stayed in the compound of the Lopez National Comprehensive High School from 1993 to 1999 before moving to its present site donated by the provincial and municipal governments.

=== PNU Visayas ===
PNU Visayas (formerly known as PNC Cadiz) opened on July 22, 1968, through the effort of Negros Occidental First District Representative Armando C. Gustilo and Cadiz Mayor Heracleo Villacin.

From Bachelor of Elementary Education and Bachelor of Secondary Education, its program offerings expanded to include master's degrees and, more recently, doctorate. For a few years, it also offered engineering courses in consortium with Technological University of the Philippines – Visayas.

=== PNU Mindanao ===
The Mindanao branch opened on August 12, 1968, as the second regional branch of PNC. It sits on a 15.4-hectare donated lot along the Gibong River in Prosperidad, Agusan (now part of Agusan del Sur after the division of the province) secured by then-Agusan Lone District Representative Jose C. Aquino.

It provides leadership in cultural activities for the preservation of folk arts: the music, dance, and rituals of the Manobos and Higaonons of the province.

== Academics ==
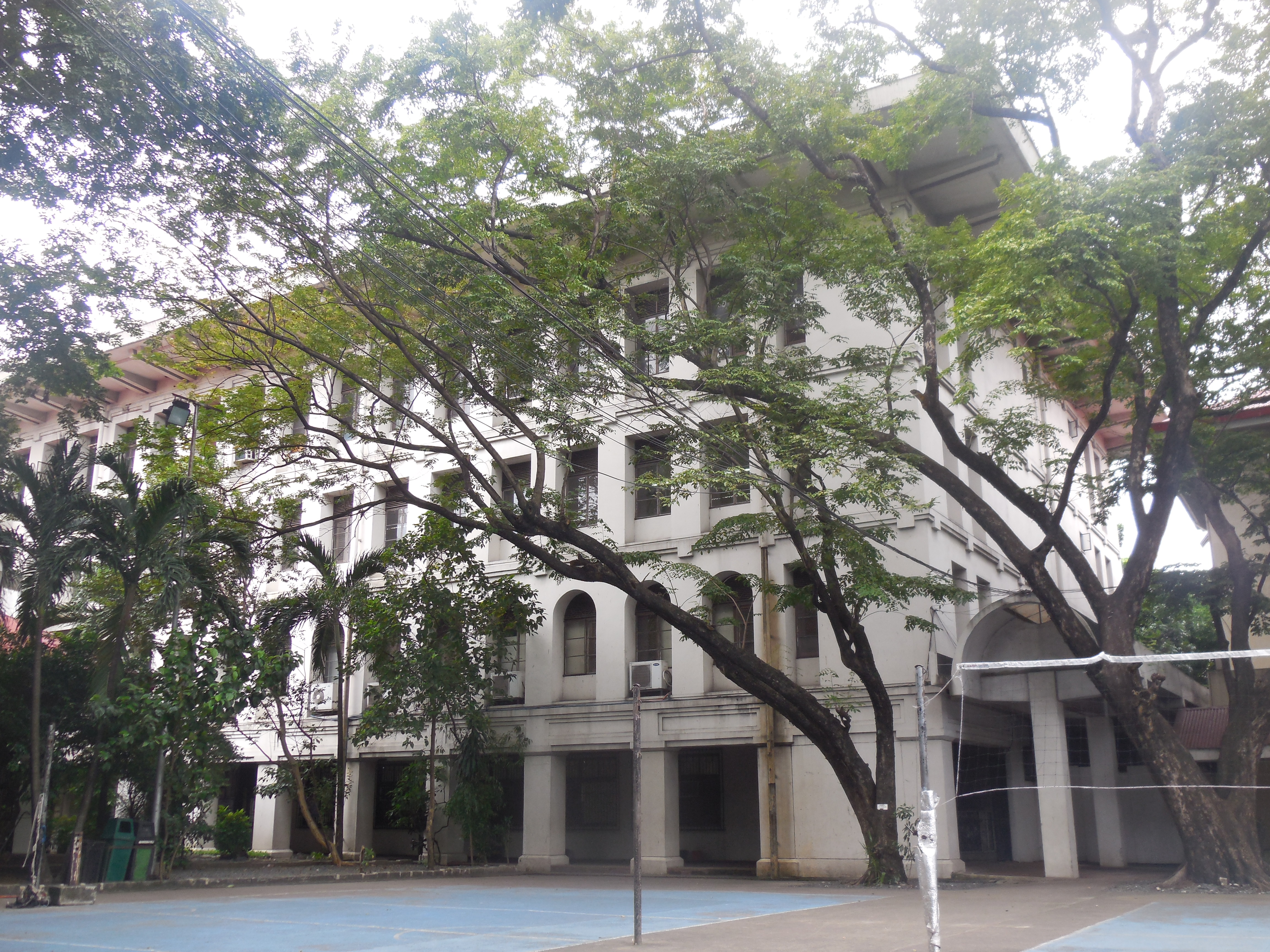
The Edilberto P. Dagot Hall houses the university library .

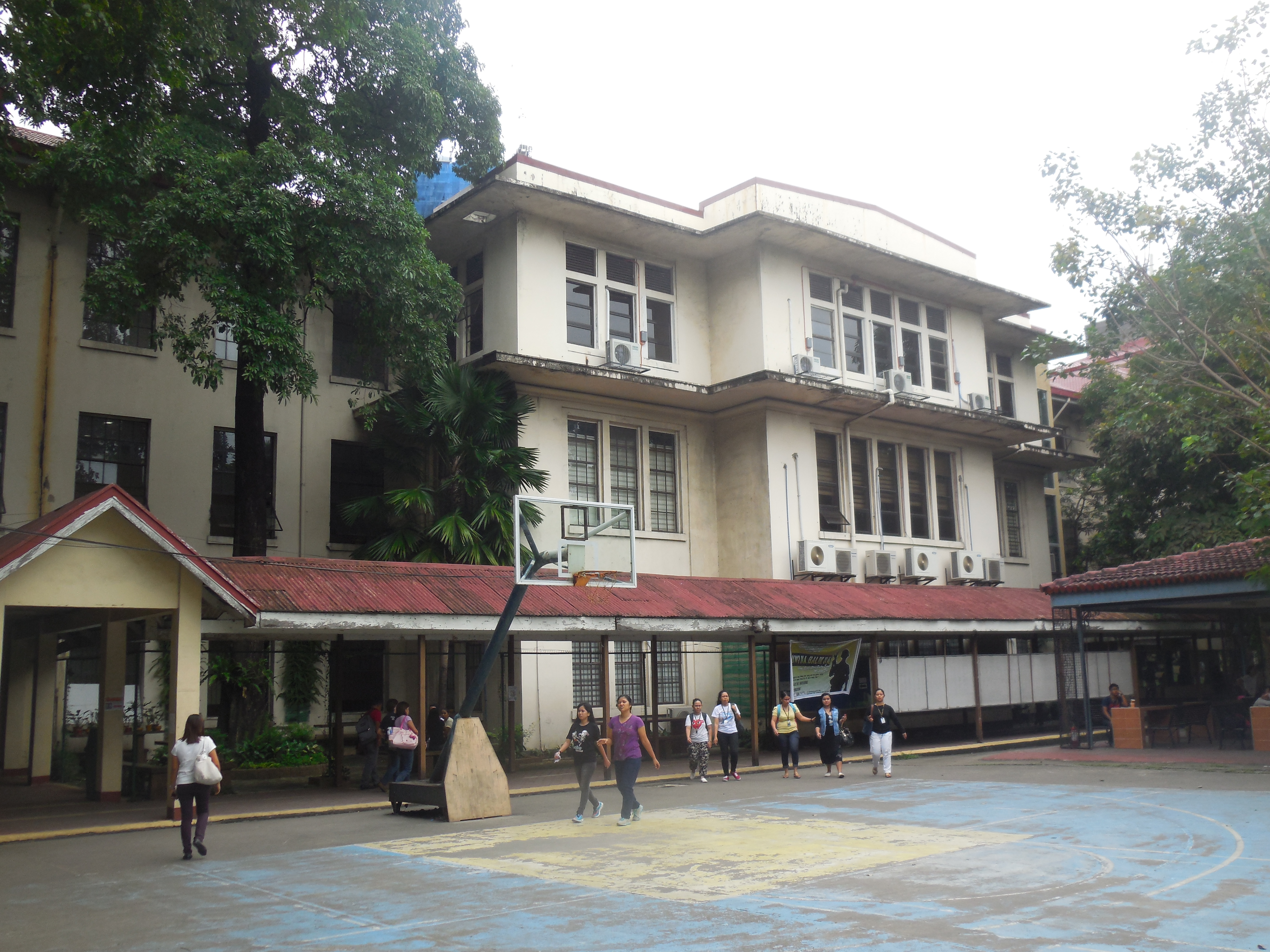
The Faculty Center (formerly College of Education Building)

PNU offers programs in elementary, secondary, and tertiary levels. However, the majority of the undergraduate and graduate programs are offered only on the Manila campus. The undergraduate programs follow an outcomes-based teacher education curriculum that puts emphasis on content specialization.

In 2014, PNU was identified by a study of the Philippine Business for Education as one of the top-performing schools in the licensure examination for teachers in both elementary and secondary levels. The five-year study analyzed the passing rates of 1,025 institutions that offer an elementary education program and 1,259 institutions that offer a secondary education program.

=== Colleges and institutes ===
==== College of Flexible Learning and e-PNU (CFLex) ====
The College of Flexible Learning and e-PNU functions as a degree and non-degree college that manages the University's online undergraduate and graduate degree programs, and continuing education programs.

==== College of Graduate Studies and Teacher Education Research (CGSTER) ====
The College of Graduate Studies and Teacher Education Research of the Philippine Normal University is the largest graduate school of education in the country with 12 doctorate programs and 62 masters programs in fields of specialization. It has only one faculty, the Graduate Teacher Education Faculty. CGSTER is in the Pedro Orata Hall of the University.

==== College of Teacher Development (CTD) ====
The College of Teacher Development is the undergraduate school of the University that offers bachelor's degree in early childhood, elementary, and secondary education with fields of specialization. The College Dean is assisted by five associate deans of faculties — Languages and Literature (FLL) that houses the fields of English and Filipino; Behavioral and Social Sciences (FBeSS) that houses the fields of Psychology, Social Sciences, and Values Education; Education and Information Sciences (FEIS) that houses the fields of Early Childhood Education, Library and Information Sciences, and Technology and Livelihood Education with Specialization in Information Technology; General Education and Experiential Learning (FGEEL) that manages the freshmen students and the 4th year students that are taking Field Study 1 and 2, and Practice Teaching; and Science, Technology and Mathematics (FSTeM) that houses the fields of Biology, Chemistry, Mathematics, Mathematics and Science Elementary, and Physics.

==== Institute of Creative Expressions and Human Movement Education (ICEHME) ====
The Institute of Creative Expressions and Human Movement Education offers the bachelor's degree in Physical Education and Culture and Arts Education that spearheads the athletic, recreation, and dance events in the University.

==== Institute of Teaching and Learning (ITL) ====
The Institute of Teaching and Learning is the basic education unit of the University. It houses the kindergarten, grade school and junior high school students and serves as the training ground for the Field Studies and Practice Teaching of the pre-service teachers of the University.

== Organization and administration ==
Superintendents of the Philippine Normal School
Name	Tenure of office
Elmer B. Bryan	1901-1903
George Beattie	1903-1909
Andrew W. Cain	1911-1913
Harvey Albert Bordner	1915-1918
Charles W. Franks	1918-1920
Homer L. Nearpass	1920-1922
Scott McCormick	1922-1924
Roy K. Gilmore	1924-1929
Mary E. Polley	1929
Roy Gilmore	1929-1939
Manuel Escarilla	1939
Apolonio M. Ramos	1946-1947
Venancio Trinidad	1947
Antonio A. Maceda	1949-1950
Presidents of the Philippine Normal College
Name	Tenure of office
Macario Naval	1950-1958
Emiliano Ramirez	1958-1970
Gregorio Borlaza	1971–1972
Bonifacio P. Sibayan	1972-1981
Edilberto P. Dagot	1981-1990
Presidents of the Philippine Normal University
Name	Tenure of office
Gloria Salandanan	1991–1998
Lilia S. Garcia	1998–2002
Nilo L. Rosas	2002–2006
Lutgardo B. Barbo	2006-2010
Fe A. Hidalgo (OIC)	2010
Ester B. Ogena	2010–2017
Ma. Antoinette C. Montealegre (OIC)	2018-2019
Bert J. Tuga	2019–present
References

=== Board of Regents ===
The highest decision-making body of the university is the Board of Regents. It is vested with general powers of administration and the exercise of title powers of the corporation. As of January 31, 2025, its members are:

Position	Board Member	Designation
Chairperson	Dr. Shirley C. Agrupis	Chairperson, Commission on Higher Education
Vice Chairperson	Bert J. Tuga	President, Philippine Normal University
Member	Senator Loren Legarda	Chairperson, Senate Committee on Higher, Technical and Vocational Education
Member	Rep. Jude A. Acidre	Chairperson, House Committee on Higher and Technical Education
Member	Girlie Grace J. Casimiro-Igtiben	Director, Social Development Staff, Department of Economy, Planning, and Development
Member	Dr. Rodrigo D. Abenes	President, Federation of PNU Faculty Unions
Member	Arnold D. Monticalvo	Chairperson, PNU National Union of Student Governments
Member	Teresita G. Domalanta	Executive Director, NCTE-PNU Alumni Association, Inc.
Member	Jorge A. Garcia	Private Sector Representative

The University and Board Secretary is Mr. Janir T. Datukan.

The members serve without compensation but they are reimbursed for necessary expenses incurred in their attendance of meetings of the Board or in connection with their official business authorities by resolution of the Board.

=== Administration ===
The administration of the university is vested in the president, who is appointed to a four-year renewable term, by the Board of Regents upon the recommendation of a search committee. As provided by law, the PNU President also sits as a member of the Literacy Coordinating Council. The incumbent University President is Bert J. Tuga who was appointed on December 10, 2019.

The University President is assisted by four vice presidents - for academics; finance and administration; research, planning, and quality assurance; and university relations and advancement.

Each regional branch is headed by an executive director and provost appointed by the Board of Regents upon the recommendation of the University President.

Campus	Head	Designation	Faculty (2020)	Administrative Personnel (2020)	Total
Manila	Bert J. Tuga	University President	200	226	426
North Luzon	Leticia N. Aquino	Executive Director and Provost	38	20	58
South Luzon	Leah Amor S. Cortez	Executive Director and Provost	14	12	26
Visayas	Denmark L. Yonson	Executive Director and Provost	40	16	56
Mindanao	Adelyne M. Costelo-Abrea	Executive Director and Provost	42	30	72

=== Budget and finance ===
As a state university, funding for PNU primarily comes from the government subsidy allocated in the national budget or General Appropriations Act. Under Republic Act No. 10931 or the Universal Access to Quality Tertiary Education Act, PNU students are exempted from tuition and other school fees.

For 2026, the university was appropriated with ₱1,563,269,000 in the General Appropriations Act.

For 2023, the university was appropriated with ₱874,529,000 (from ₱880,462,000 in 2022) in the General Appropriations Act broken down as follows: ₱620,184,000 for Personnel Services; ₱190,427,000 for Maintenance and Other Operating Expenses; and ₱25,000,000 for Capital Outlays. For 2024, the proposed budget for PNU is ₱925,474,000.

In 2020, PNU reported a total of ₱54,118,968.41 in revenues and ₱622,266,184.05 in expenses.

In 2016, PNU budget was decreased by ₱132 million (19%) from its 2015 budget of ₱690 million due to a one-time congressional insertion in 2015 of ₱100M and its low utilization rate.

== Student publication ==
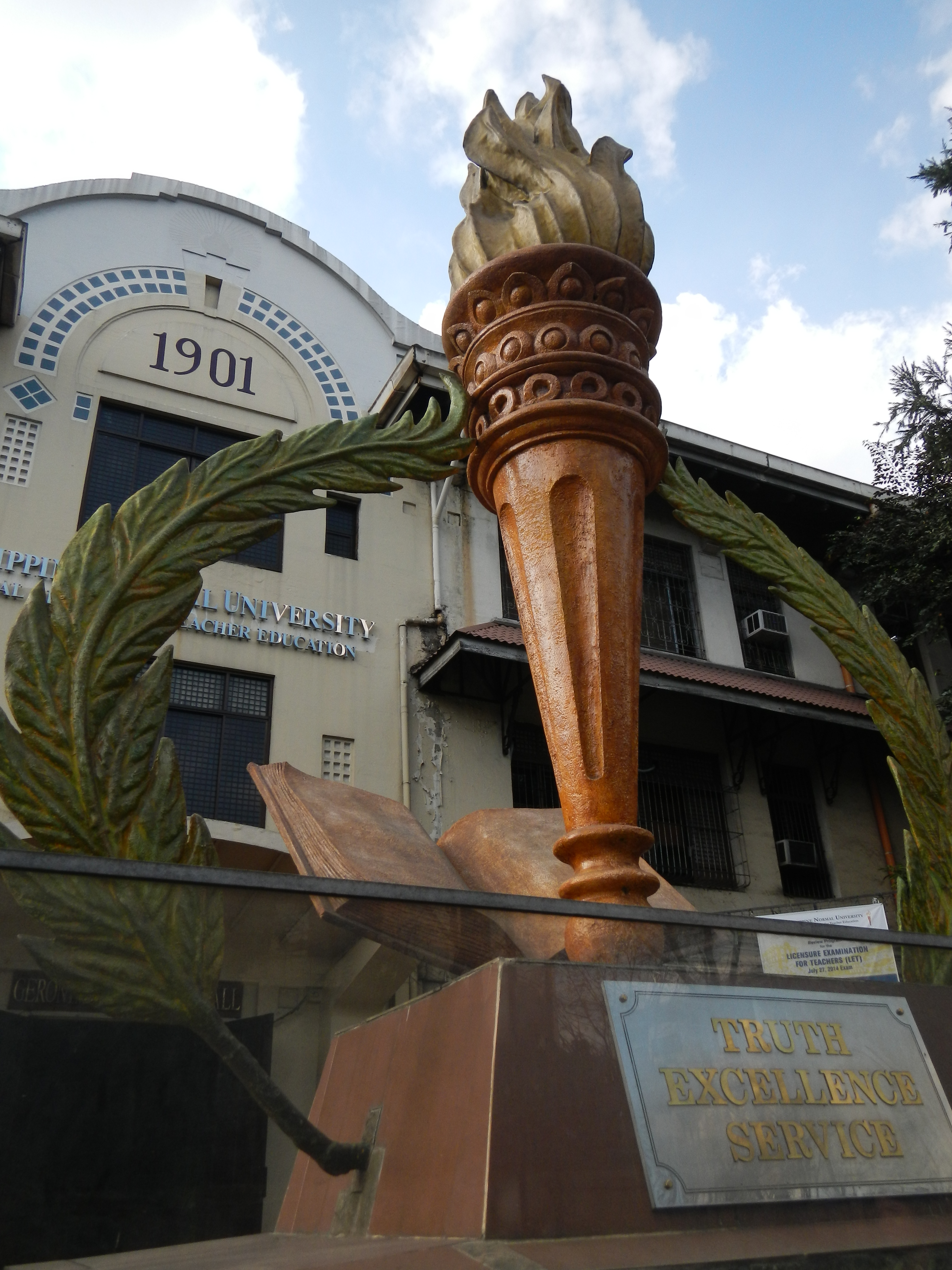
The Torch, the official symbol of the university and name of its official publication

NHCP historical markers of the university
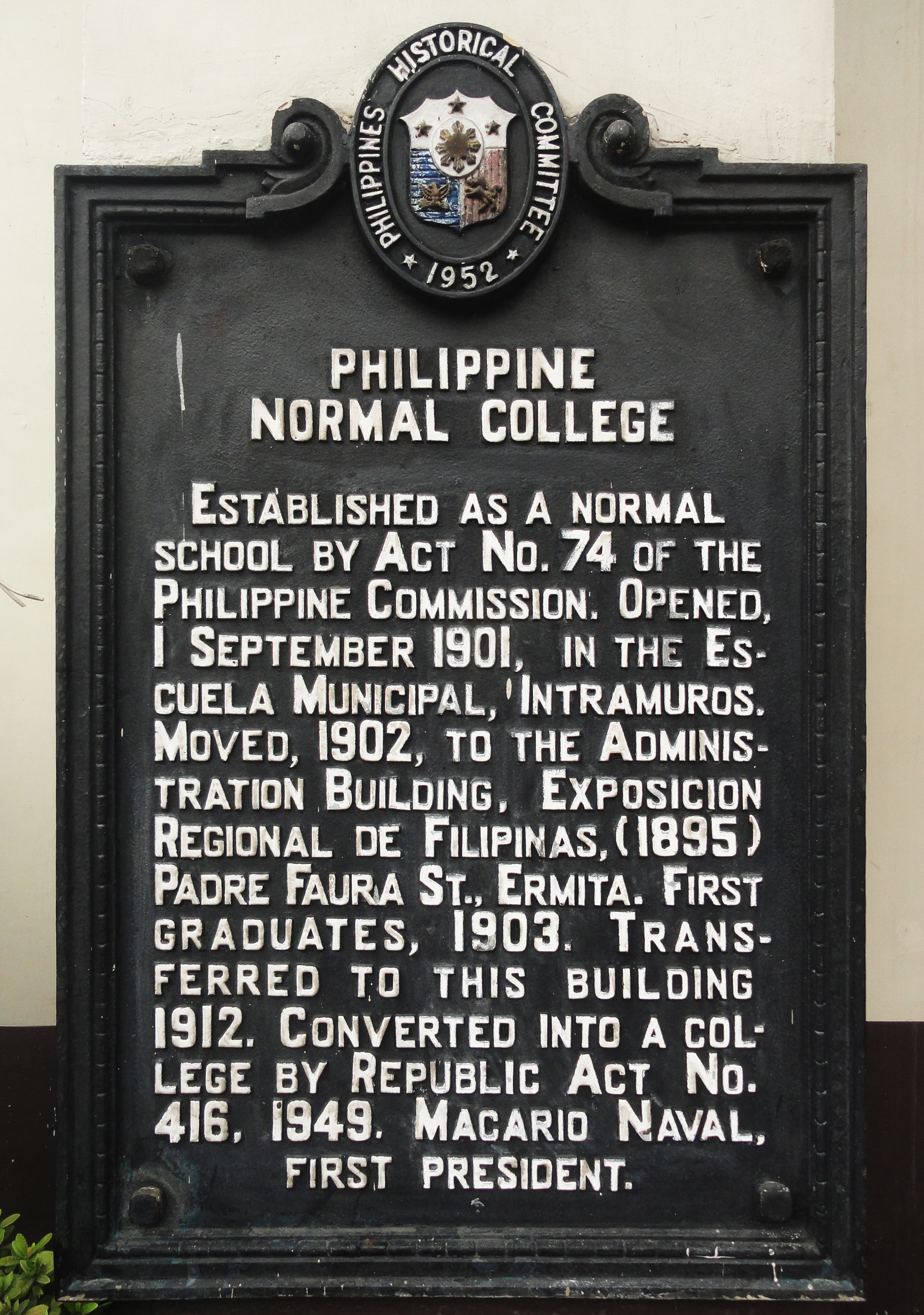
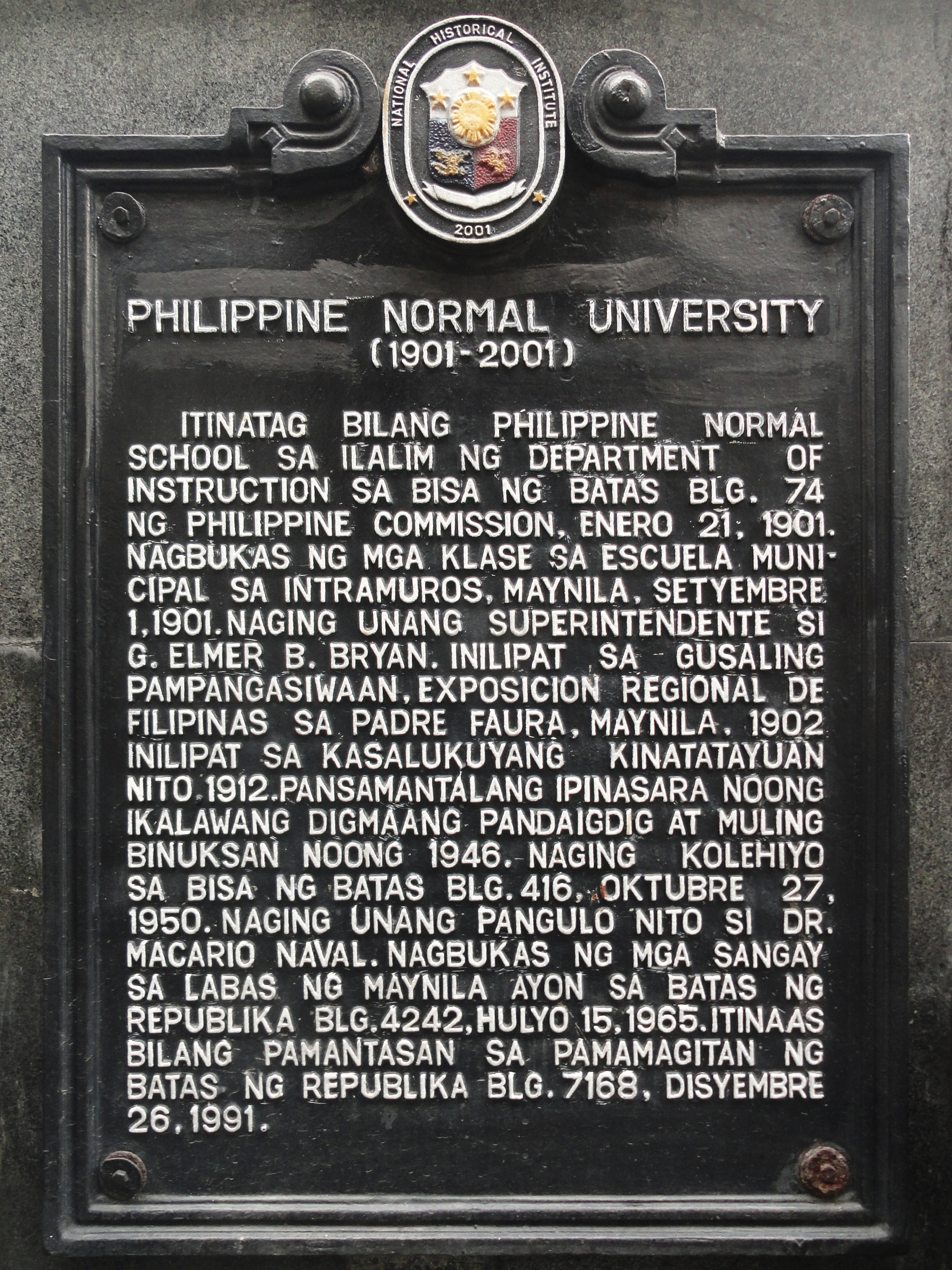

Founded in 1912, The Torch (Filipino: Ang Sulo) is the official student publication of the university. It publishes periodicals and other printed materials funded, managed, and written by the students. The Torch publishes at least seven issues annually with the option of supplements, a special Filipino issue, called Ang Sulo, and a literary folio, called Aklas.

It also holds activities, contests, and events, such as the annual "Liyab", a citywide journalism training seminar for high school publications, the "LitSem" or Literary Seminar workshop, and the Gawad Genoveva Edroza-Matute.

The publication is a member of the Progresibong Lupon ng mga Manunulat ng PNU (PLUMA-PNU) and the College Editors Guild of the Philippines (CEGP).

== Notable faculty and alumni ==
=== Education and social work ===
- Edwin Bingham Copeland, founder of the UP College of Agriculture
- Josefa Llanes Escoda, patriot and founder of the Girl Scouts of the Philippines
- Aurora Aragon Quezon, first Chairperson of the Philippine Red Cross; former First Lady
- Conrado Benitez, founder of the Philippine Women's University
- Francisca Benitez, founder of the Philippine Women's University
- Pedro Orata, proponent of barrio high schools and 1971 Ramon Magsaysay Awardee
- Soledad Duterte, teacher and activist; mother of President Rodrigo Duterte

=== Politics and government service ===
- Vicente Barros, Army Major, officer of the Philippine Scouts and Philippine Constabulary
- Vicente Lim, Army Brigadier General; World War II hero
- José Fabella, physician and first Secretary of Health
- Mariano Marcos, former Congressman of Ilocos Norte; father of Late President Ferdinand Marcos
- Esteban Abada, former Senator and Undersecretary of Education
- Cecilio Putong, former Secretary of Education
- Salvador Escudero, former Minister of Agriculture and Congressman of Sorsogon
- Jejomar Binay, former Mayor of Makati and former Vice President of the Philippines
- Amy Lazaro-Javier, 182nd Associate Justice of the Supreme Court
- Magnolia Antonino, former Senator
- France Castro, Member, House of Representatives for ACT Teachers Party-list

=== Arts, literature, and media ===
- Severino Montano, National Artist for Theater, former Dean of Instruction of Philippine Normal College
- Ismael Mallari, essayist and lyricist of the PNU Hymn (English)
- Maria Odulio de Guzman, lexicographer and translator of Noli Me Tangere and El Filibusterismo
- Genoveva Edroza-Matute, fiction writer, Palanca Awardee, former Dean of Instruction and lyricist of the PNU Hymn (Filipino)
- Ama Quiambao, theater, film, and television actress
- Eros Atalia, Palanca Award-winning writer
