= Dr. Jose Fabella Memorial Hospital =

Government hospital in Manila, Philippines

- Department of Health
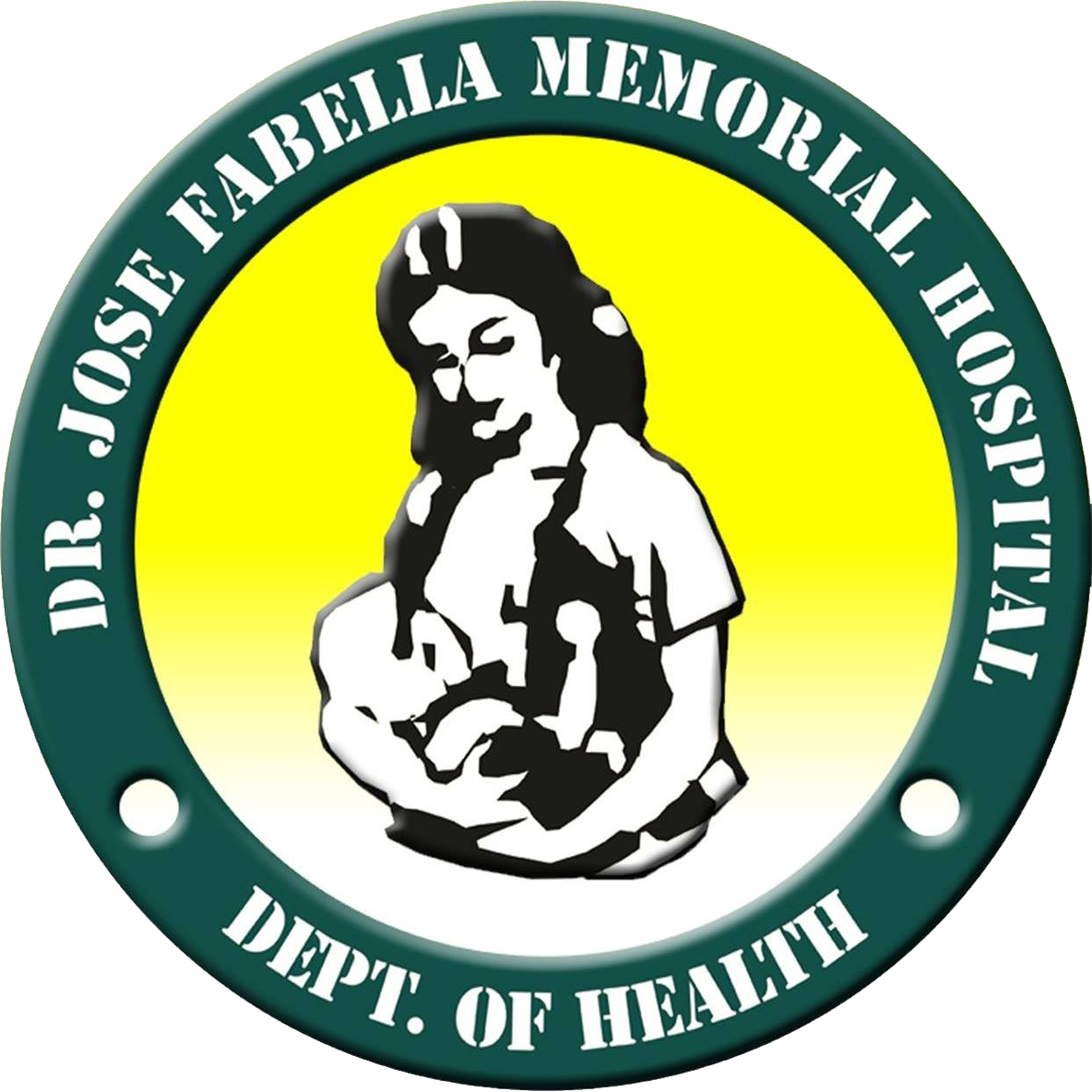

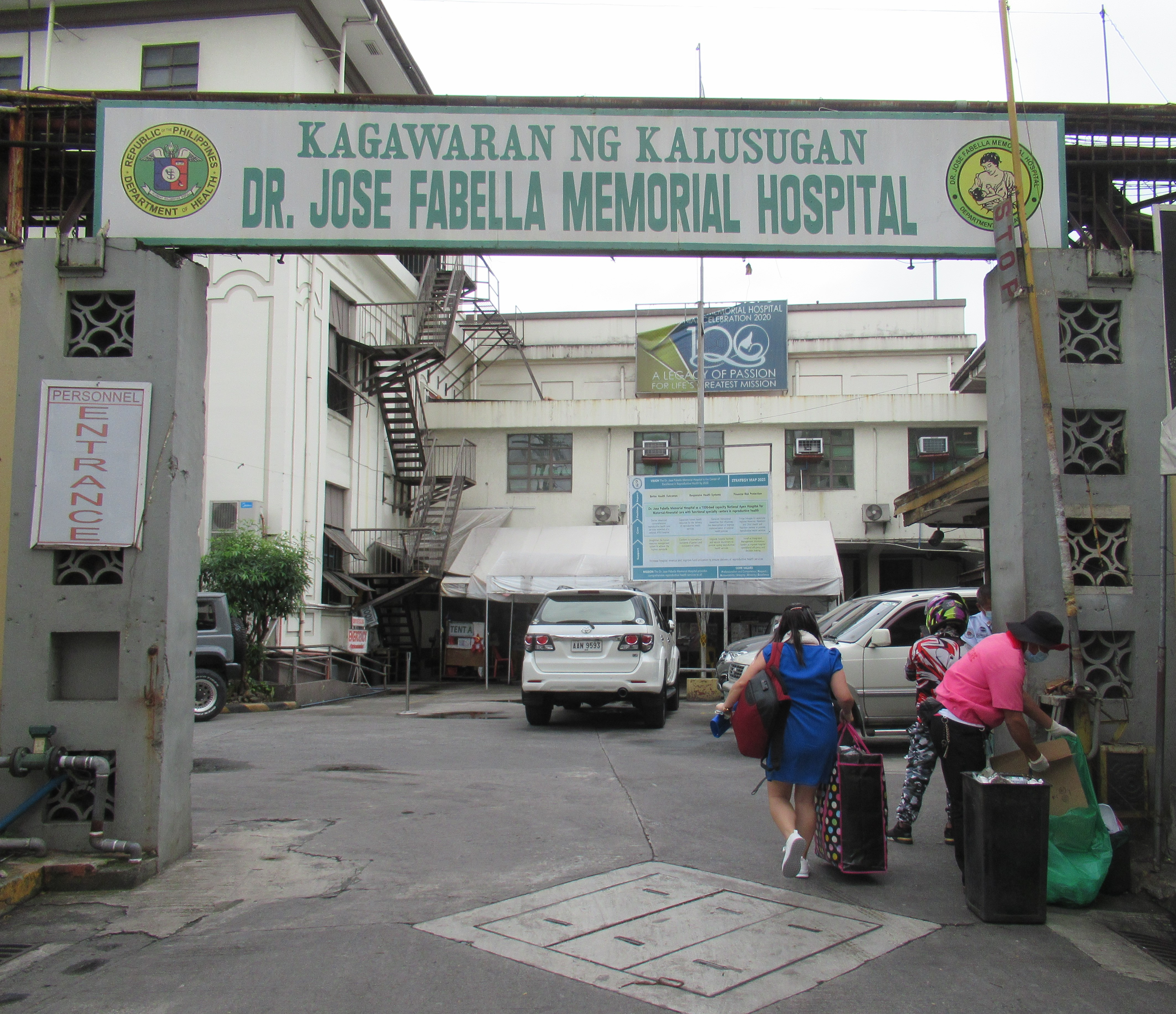
- Facade of the Hospital

- Location in Metro Manila

Geography
- Location: Tayuman Street, Santa Cruz, Manila, Philippines
- Coordinates: 14°36′22″N 120°59′03″E

Organization
- Type: Specialist

Services
- Beds: 800
- Speciality: Obstetrics; Gynecology; Pediatrics

History
- Opened: November 9, 1920; 105 years ago

Links
- Website: fabella.doh.gov.ph
- Lists: Hospitals in the Philippines

Dr. Jose Fabella Memorial Hospital, the National Maternity Hospital, is a maternal and newborn tertiary hospital located in Santa Cruz, Manila in the Philippines. It also houses the Jose Fabella Memorial Hospital School of Midwifery, an institute recognized by the Professional Regulation Commission in the Midwife Licensure Examinations for its performance. In 2015, the World Health Organization recognized the hospital "as a role model of the World Health Organization-Western Pacific Region Office for its essential newborn care programs, which have been proven to reduce infant morbidity and mortality".

== History ==
Dr. Jose Fabella Memorial Hospital started as a six-bed clinic called the "Maternity House" on November 9, 1920. The clinic, which was founded by then Chairman of Public Welfare Board, Jose F. Fabella, was originally located along Isabel Street in Sampaloc, Manila. It was taken over by the Public Welfare Commission the following year. In 1922, the clinic added a pediatric section and a school of midwifery. In 1931, the control of the clinic was handed over to the Bureau of Health and in 1947 to the Bureau of Hospitals. In 1951, the clinic moved to its present location at the Old Bilibid compound at Santa Cruz, Manila.

Unlike other Philippine government hospitals, there was no legislative act that permitted the creation of the hospital. Its present location was only legitimized by Administrative Order no. 140, which was issued by President Manuel L. Quezon on February 19, 1941. The Administrative Order recommended that the Bilibid Hospital be used as a maternity hospital. On June 15, 1968, the Maternity and Children's Hospital was renamed Dr. Jose Fabella Memorial Hospital in honor of the hospital's founder. To date, it has an authorized bed capacity of 700.

The Jose Fabella Memorial Hospital School of Midwifery is housed within the hospital. It is a government institution managed by the Department of Health.

The hospital is considered a "baby factory" and a "ground zero for the Philippines’ overpopulation crisis." As a result, there are not enough beds for patients, so 4 to 5 mothers share one bed. The hospital also suffers from extreme heat during the summer.

In May 2022, the hospital was moved to a new building on Tayuman Street, Sta Cruz, Manila. The new building has a capacity of 800 beds.
