= Patis Tesoro =

Filipino fashion designer (born 1950)

- Born: Maria Beatriz Pamintuan; 1950 (age 75–76); Iloilo, Philippines
- Occupations: Fashion designer, textile artist
- Known for: Contemporary Filipiniana and piña textiles
- Relatives: José Fabella (maternal grandfather)
- Awards: Order of National Artists of the Philippines, Fashion design (2026)

Maria Beatriz Pamintuan Tesoro (born 1950), known as Patis Tesoro, is a Filipino fashion designer and textile artist. She is known for contemporary interpretations of Filipiniana and for using piña, embroidery, beadwork, appliqué and other Philippine textile traditions in her work. In 2026, she was proclaimed a National Artist of the Philippines for Design as part of the 2025 roster.

== Early life and education ==
Tesoro was born Maria Beatriz Pamintuan in Iloilo in 1950. She grew up around her dressmaker mother's business. "Patis" is a childhood nickname formed as a play on "Beatriz". Her maternal grandfather is José Fabella of Pagsanjan, Laguna, who is widely considered as "father of public health and social welfare in the Philippines." She learned embroidery while attending Assumption Iloilo, where she was taught by a nun, Sister Maria Paz.

She studied art education at Marygrove College in Detroit and later attended Maryknoll College, now Miriam College, after returning to the Philippines. She did not complete a degree, leaving college after she married into the Tesoro family.

== Career ==
=== Fashion and textile work ===
Tesoro began selling handmade embroidered garments in a section of her mother-in-law's shop, Tesoro's: The House of Philippine Treasures, and was working in ready-to-wear fashion by the age of 19. During the 1970s she supplied terno separates and voile garments to ShoeMart and later opened her own dress shop. She also attended the Madonna School of Fashion to learn cutting and pattern making. By the late 1980s and 1990s, her label was particularly associated with made-to-order bridal and formal wear based on Filipiniana forms. She later expanded her ready-to-wear output, including looser clothing that she described as Filipino Bohemian and Gypsy.

After observing that piña cloth was becoming scarce, Tesoro began making trips to Aklan in 1986. She worked with weavers and local officials and advocated weaving programmes for younger people. Fashion historian Mina Roces likewise records that Tesoro travelled to Kalibo in the mid-1980s for the purpose of reviving piña weaving. Tesoro subsequently worked with artisans and craft communities in areas including Lumban, Abra, Ifugao, Bulacan and Iloilo. These projects involved piña production, natural dyeing, embroidery and the weaving of abacá, jusi and patadyong.

Her designs combine forms such as the baro't saya, terno, kimona and barong tagalog with embroidery, appliqué, beadwork, hand-painting and repurposed cloth. She has also adapted textiles and silhouettes encountered during travel elsewhere in Asia. Her 34-piece La Collection Rouge, presented for Rustan's at Sofitel Manila in February 2015, combined handwoven piña with painted, embroidered, beaded and upcycled material.

Tesoro moved her residence and atelier from San Juan to San Pablo, Laguna, in 2016. She has continued to train artisans there in embroidery and related techniques.

=== Visual art and exhibitions ===
In addition to clothing, Tesoro produces coloured illustrations and textile tapestries. Her tapestries combine reused piña, upholstery, batik, malong and other cloth with appliqué and embroidery. In March 2022, Finale Art File in Makati presented Busisi, an exhibition of more than 130 of her textile works and illustrations. The exhibition had been assembled beginning in 2019 but was delayed during the COVID-19 pandemic.

Tesoro's career was documented in the 2025 book and documentary Filipiniana Is Forever. The project surveyed five decades of her designs and textile work.

== Personal life ==
Patis Tesoro’s husband is the late lawyer, historian, law professor Jose Claro “Tito” Tesoro who passed away in 2016 after 46 years of marriage. They had four children.

== Recognition ==
On September 1, 2026, she was proclaimed National Artist of the Philippines for Fashion Design by President Bongbong Marcos, by virtue of Proclamation No. 1414.
