= Ismael Mallari =

Ismael Villanueva Mallari was one of the early Filipino writers in English. He was primarily an essayist. He is ranked as the leading literary and art critic in the Philippines.

== Education ==
From his hometown, Malabon, in Rizal Province, Mallari went to the Philippine Normal School in Manila, then he went as a government pensionado to the University of Wisconsin (USA) for further studies in English, Education and Library Science. For his accomplishments, Mallari was included in the Pan-Pacific Who's Who and the Who's Who library Science. He taught in the Department of Library Science. Later, he worked for the United Nations Educational, Scientific, and Cultural Organization (UNESCO) in Manila, the capital of the Philippines.

== Personal life ==
Ismael Villanueva Mallari married Natividad "Nati" Dolores Quidato Sanglap of San Joaquin, Iloilo in April 1932. On 27 December 1932, their daughter, named Vita Araceli Sanglap Mallari, was born. Two years later, Ismael and Nati separated.

== Writings ==
He wrote widely and covered a broad range of subjects. His books were usually published under the name I.V. Mallari. His works include "When I Was A Little Boy," "Values," "Tales from the Mountain Province," and "Footprints on the Sand".

== Opinions ==
In his The Filipino IN English: A Critical Study with Anthology of Representative Essays (1912–1941), Prof. Leopoldo Yabes of the University of the Philippines says: "While he (Mallari) could not be ranked among the abler critics of the older school, he was conceded by a number of informed persons to be the best writer on problems of Architecture and city planning. He wrote on Architecture with the understanding and skill of a truly artistic temperament." Another noted literature, Puro Santillan Castrence, has this to say "One of the country’s most reliable essayist in English . . . Mallari’s forte in his essays was in his use of simple words neatly and economically. He wrote poems, too."
