= María Odulio de Guzmán =

Filipino teacher, educator, principal, writer and author

María Odulio de Guzmán (born 1895) was a Filipino teacher, educator, principal, writer, and author.

She was the first Filipino female principal of a secondary school in the Philippines. She worked as a teacher at the Nueva Écija High School in the province of Nueva Écija from 1918 to 1928.

She graduated in 1930 from Radford State Teachers' College (now Radford University), located in Radford, Virginia, United States. She was a professor at the Philippine Normal College.

She was a compiler and author of several multilingual dictionaries in Filipino, Spanish, and English. She was also a translator of José Rizal's Noli Me Tangere and a co-translator of El filibusterismo, another novel by Rizal.

== Works ==
Among the dictionaries M.O. de Guzman authored include:

- English-Tagalog-Spanish and Tagalog-English Vocabulary, (with co-author Domingo de Guzman, Quezon City, Pressman, 1963, 228 pages)
- An English-Tagalog and Tagalog-English Dictionary (1966)
- New Tagalog-English English-Tagalog (1966)
- New English-Filipino Filipino-English Dictionary (1968)
- English-Tagalog and Tagalog-English Dictionary (1966)
- New English-Tagalog and Tagalog-English Dictionary (1968)
- The New Filipino-English/English-Filipino Dictionary (January 1, 1968)
- Bagong Diksiyonaryo: Pilipino-Ingles, Ingles-Pilipino (1968)
- Diksiyunaryo Pilipino-Ingles Pilipino (Pilipino-English-Pilipino Dictionary) (1970)
- An English-Tagalog and Tagalog-English Dictionary (1979)
- English-Tagalog and Tagalog-English Dictionary (1982)
- An English-Tagalog and Tagalog-English Dictionary (January 1, 1988)
- English-Tagalog and Tagalog-English Dictionary (January 1, 1993)
- English-Tagalog and Tagalog-English (2000)
- New Tagalog-English Dictionary (2006)
- Bagong Talatinigan: Pilipino-Ingles Ingles-Pilipino ISBN 971-08-1745-0

Translated works / Mga Akdang Isinalin

- El filibusterismo ni Dr. Jose Rizal
- Noli Me Tangere ni Dr. Jose Rizal
