= Jose Fabella Memorial School =

- Pang-alaalang Paaralang Jose Fabella

Location
- Welfareville Compound; Mandaluyong, Metro Manila 1550; Philippines
- Coordinates: 14°35′06″N 121°02′04″E

Information
- Other name: Welfareville School
- Type: Public
- Established: December 3, 1925 (100 years and 81 days)
- Founder: Jose Fabella
- Oversight: Department of Education
- Principal: Roberto P. Redobante
- Faculty: 75 (2015)
- Grades: K to 12
- Enrollment: 2,622 (2014)
- Language: English, Filipino
- Campus: Urban
- Colors: Green and yellow
- Song: The JFMS March
- Nickname: Fabellan
- Newspaper: The Fabellan Journal
- Website: jfms.depedmandaluyong.org

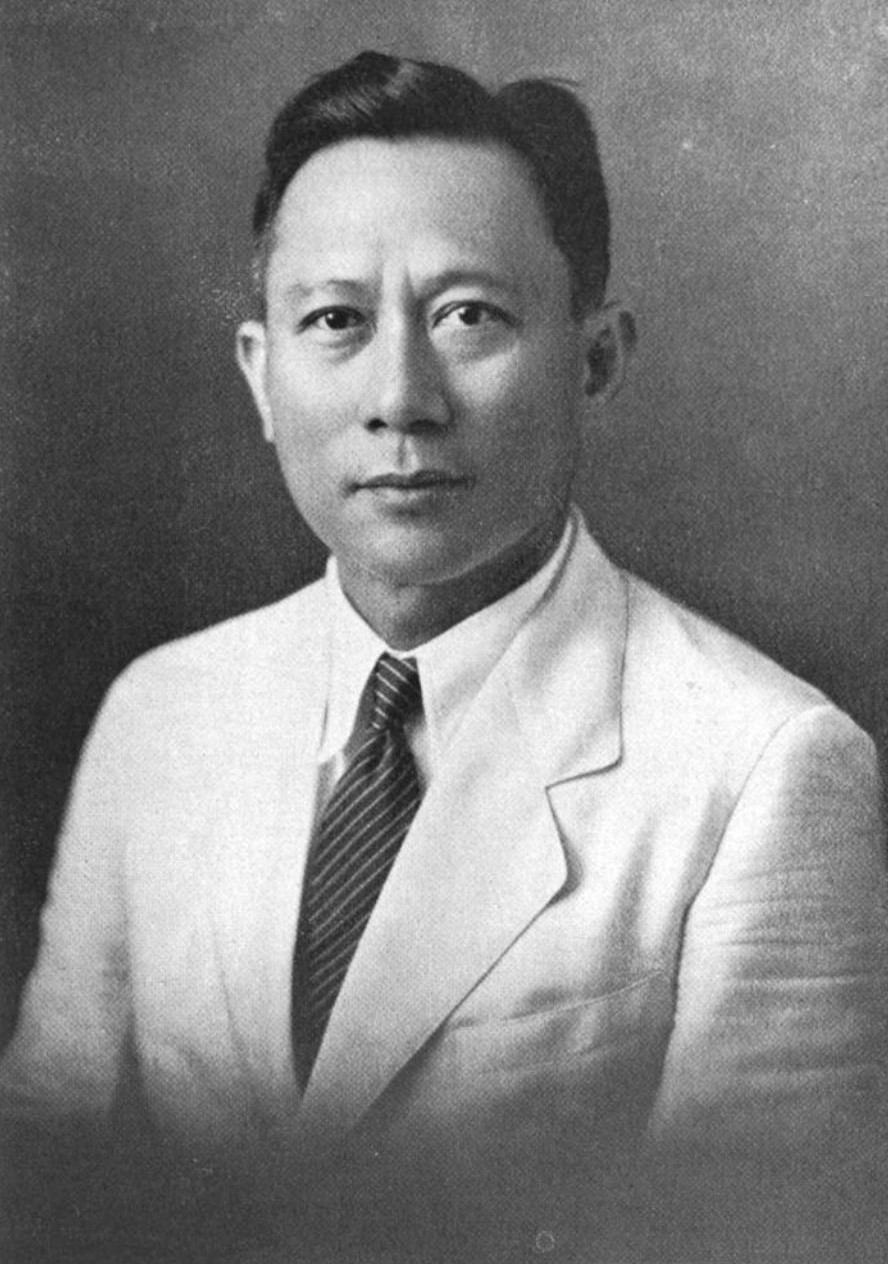
Dr. Jose Fabella, the Father of Public Health and Social Welfare in the Philippines.

The Jose Fabella Memorial School (Filipino: Pang-alaalang Paaralang Jose Fabella; abbreviated as JFMS and commonly known as Fabella) is a public integrated special school located in Welfareville Compound, Mandaluyong in Metro Manila, Philippines. Founded on December 3, 1925 as the Welfareville School, it is one of the oldest educational institutions in Mandaluyong and currently one of the four public special schools in the Philippines. It serves as the umbrella organization of 12 special education units located in different parts of Metro Manila and Rizal and offers kindergarten, elementary, secondary (junior and senior high school), alternative learning system, and special education to regular learners and learners with special education needs.

== History ==
The history of JFMS traces its roots to Act No. 2671 enacted by the Philippine Legislature on January 10, 1917 which established the first government orphanage and marked the beginning of the national child welfare program in the Philippines. On December 3, 1924, Act No. 3203 was passed, placing "public institutions intended for the care, custody, correction, education and training of orphans, homeless, neglected, abused, defective and delinquent children under the administration and supervision of the Bureau of Public Welfare". On January 6, 1925, the Bureau of Public Welfare purchased a 56-hectare land in the municipality of San Felipe Neri, Province of Rizal, where the government's child-caring institutions were established on December 3, 1925 and collectively called Welfareville Institutions. It originally consisted of 1) the Philippine Training School for Boys and the Philippine Training School for Girls, which catered to delinquent boys and girls; 2) orphanage, to provide for the care of destitute children and children of leprous parents; 3) nursery for non-leprous children below two years of age, to provide care of children of leprous parents born in Culion; 4) home for the mentally-defective children, to provide care and treatment of boys and girls who are mentally defective; and 5) home for the aged and the infirm, to provide institutional care for such persons who are destitute. A school was also established, called Welfareville School, to provide academic instruction and vocational training to orphans and wards of Welfareville Institutions.

Due to the increasing number of orphans and other beneficiaries admitted to Welfareville Institutions, a sum of ₱60,000 was appropriated by the end of 1929 for the construction of additional buildings for orphans, invalids, and aged people. A sum of ₱21,000 was also appropriated by virtue of Commonwealth Act No. 61 enacted on October 20, 1936 for the continued operation and maintenance of Welfareville Institutions.

On December 11, 1958, President Carlos P. Garcia issued Executive Order No. 326 reorganizing the Social Welfare Administration (an agency created following the abolition of Bureau of Public Welfare) which used to administer and supervise the Welfareville Institutions. This resulted to the transfer of oversight of Welfareville School to the Department of Education. Under this arrangement, the Welfareville School provided formal education to orphans and wards of Welfareville Institutions which it subsequently called "special education units,'' with the Social Welfare Administration retaining jurisdiction of the institutions.

For many years since its establishment, there have been calls to change the name of the school to remove the stigma associated with it as the "dumping ground of society's rejects." On June 21, 1963, Republic Act No. 3576 was passed changing the name of Welfareville School to Jose Fabella Memorial School. This was in honor of Dr. Jose Fabella, the first Commissioner of the Bureau of Public Welfare, at times described as the Father of Public Health and Social Welfare in the Philippines, who laid the plan for the development of Welfareville Institutions.

Following an agreement between the Philippine government and the United Nations Children's Fund to upgrade the child welfare services in the Philippines, Republic Act No. 5260 was enacted on June 15, 1968 which called for the dispersion and decentralization of the Welfareville Institutions. This led to the dispersal of the special education units of JFMS in Metro Manila and outskirts. On August 11, 2011, Republic Act No. 9155 was passed which placed JFMS under the Schools Division Office of Mandaluyong.

At present, JFMS is one of the four public special schools in the Philippines and consists of a flagship campus in Mandaluyong which caters to regular learners and learners with learning disabilities and behavioral problems and 12 special education units located in different parts of Metro Manila and Rizal which cater to learners with various special education needs.

=== JFMS Units ===
Unit	Location	Learners' Profile
Nayon ng Kabataan	Welfareville Compound, Mandaluyong	abused, orphaned, abandoned, neglected and exploited children aged 7 to 17 years old
Bagong Sinag Special School	National Center for Mental Health, Mandaluyong	mentally-handicapped patients
Jose Fabella Center	Correctional Road, Mandaluyong	strandees, transients, vagrants and mendicants
Dangerous Drugs Board—European Union Treatment and Rehabilitation Center	Diliman, Quezon City	people with drug dependence
CRIBS Foundation, Inc.	Industrial Valley, Marikina	abandoned, neglected, surrendered and female minor survivors of child abuse
Special Learning Center	City Hall, Quezon City	children with behavioral problems
Department of Health Treatment and Rehabilitation Center	Bicutan, Taguig	children and adults with drug addiction
Elsie Gaches Village	Alabang, Muntinlupa	abandoned and neglected children with mild to severe mental disorders
National Training School for Girls	Alabang, Muntinlupa	abandoned female street children
National Training School for Boys	Tanay, Rizal	male juveniles in conflict with the law aged 9 to 17 years old
Haven for Children	Alabang, Muntinlupa	boys aged 7 to 13 recovering from substance abuse
Molave Youth Homes	Diliman, Quezon City	children with behavioral problems

== Administration ==
School Principals of
Jose Fabella Memorial School
Balbino T. Jesusa
Maximo C. Songco
Ignacio F. Lim
Ignacio N. Alcantara
Gerardo A. Consolacion
Fortunata A. Rabang
Aida S. Damian*
Alicia B. Reyes*
Arsenia C. Lara*
Erdelinda G. Diaz*
Olivia L. Pagurayan
Corazon R. Regino
Roberto P. Redobante

*served as Officer-in-Charge of the Office of the Principal

Since its establishment as Welfareville School on December 3, 1925, the school was governed by Bureau of Public Welfare under the Department of Public Instruction from 1925 to 1938 and under the Department of Health and Public Welfare from 1939 to 1946. On October 4, 1947, the administration and supervision of Welfareville School was transferred to the Social Welfare Commission which replaced the Bureau of Public Welfare after its abolition. On January 3, 1951, President Elpidio Quirino issued Executive Order No. 396 converting the Social Welfare Commission into Social Welfare Administration, thereby making it the governing agency of Welfareville School. Following the reorganization of the Social Welfare Administration on December 11, 1958, the oversight of Welfareville School was transferred to the Special Subjects and Services Division, and later to the Special Education Unit of the Department of Education.

At present, JFMS is directly supervised by the Schools Division Office of Mandaluyong which oversees all public and private elementary and secondary educational institutions, including alternative learning systems in its jurisdiction. JFMS is headed by a Special Education Principal with the assistance of three Assistant Principals, for Grade School, Junior High School, and Senior High School, all of whom are designated by the Schools Division Office. The special education units of JFMS are headed by Teachers-in-Charge designated by the principal.

JFMS is broadly organized into three departments: Grade School, Junior High School, and Senior High School, each headed by a department head; 12 grade levels: Grades 1 to 12, each headed by a grade level chairperson; and eight subject areas for Grade School and Junior High School, each headed by a subject area coordinator.

As of 2015, JFMS had a total of 104 personnel complement, including 39 elementary and 36 secondary special education teachers.

== Campus ==
The main campus of JFMS sits on a portion of 56-hectare government land which is now the sprawling Welfareville Compound. Other government agencies located along the vicinity of JFMS include the Nayon ng Kabataan (front), Welfareville Commission (left) and Commission on Population (right). The units of JFMS are located in Metro Manila, except for the National Training School for Boys which is situated in Tanay, Rizal.

== People ==
People affiliated with JFMS as students, graduates, and teaching and non-teaching personnel are called "Fabellans." Graduates of the school are inducted annually as members of the Jose Fabella Memorial School Alumni Association.

== Gallery ==
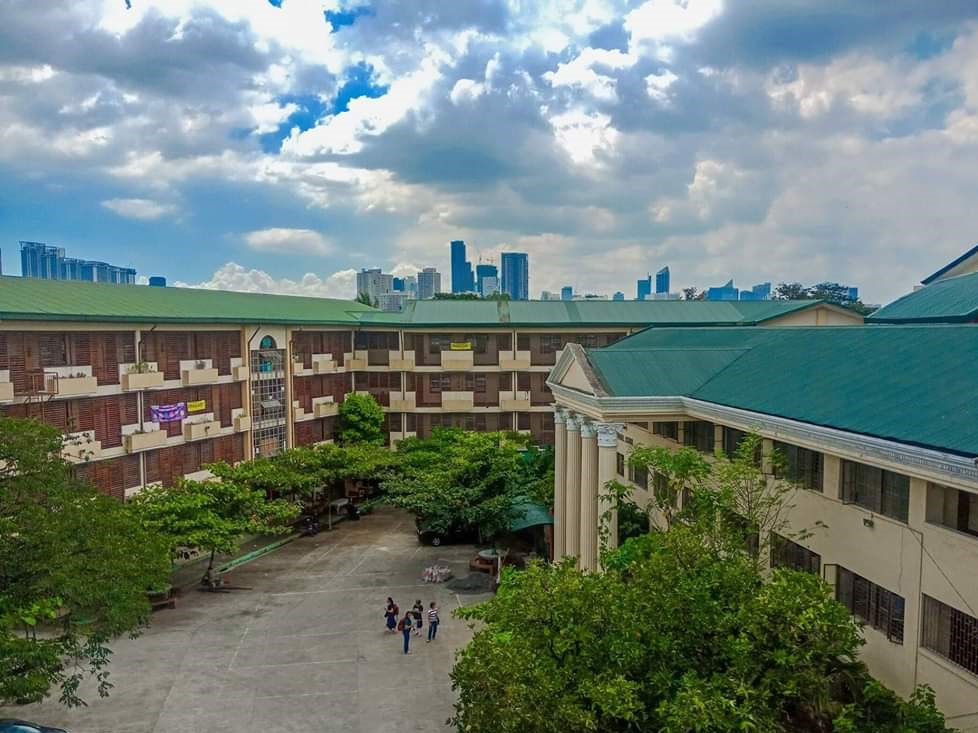
JFMS quadrangle facing the administration building

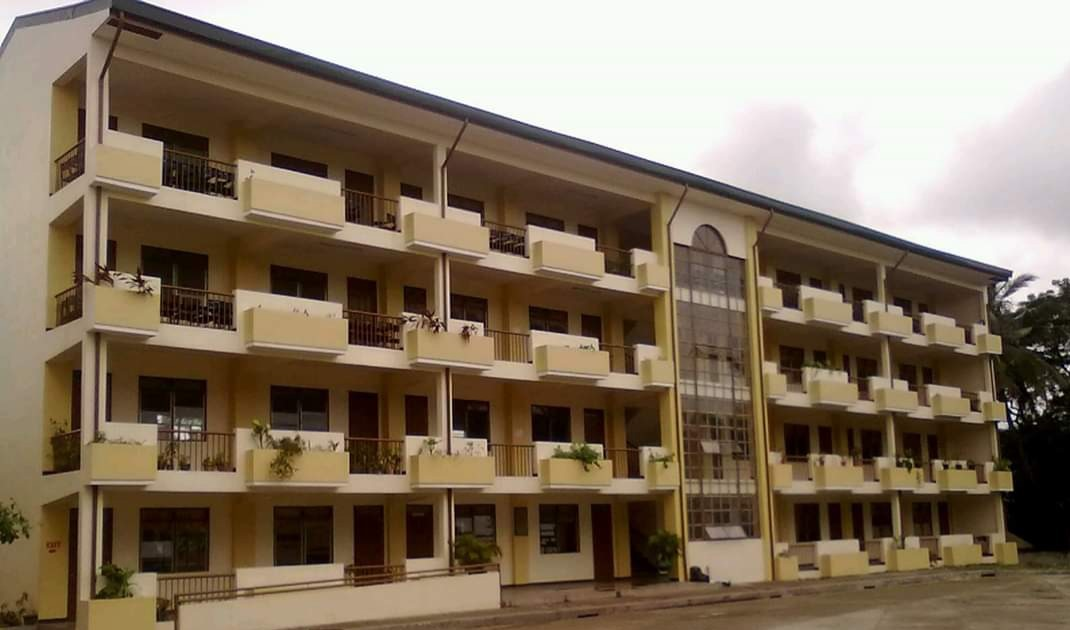
One of the high school buildings

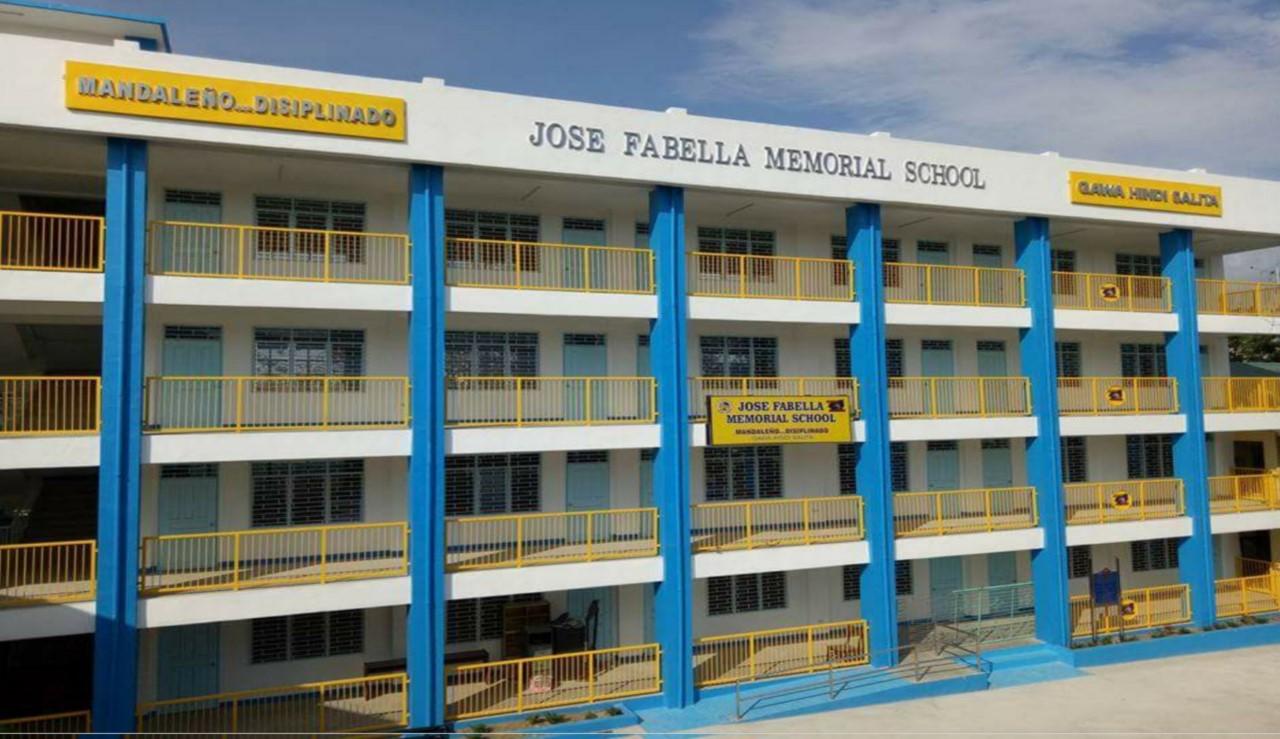
Special education building

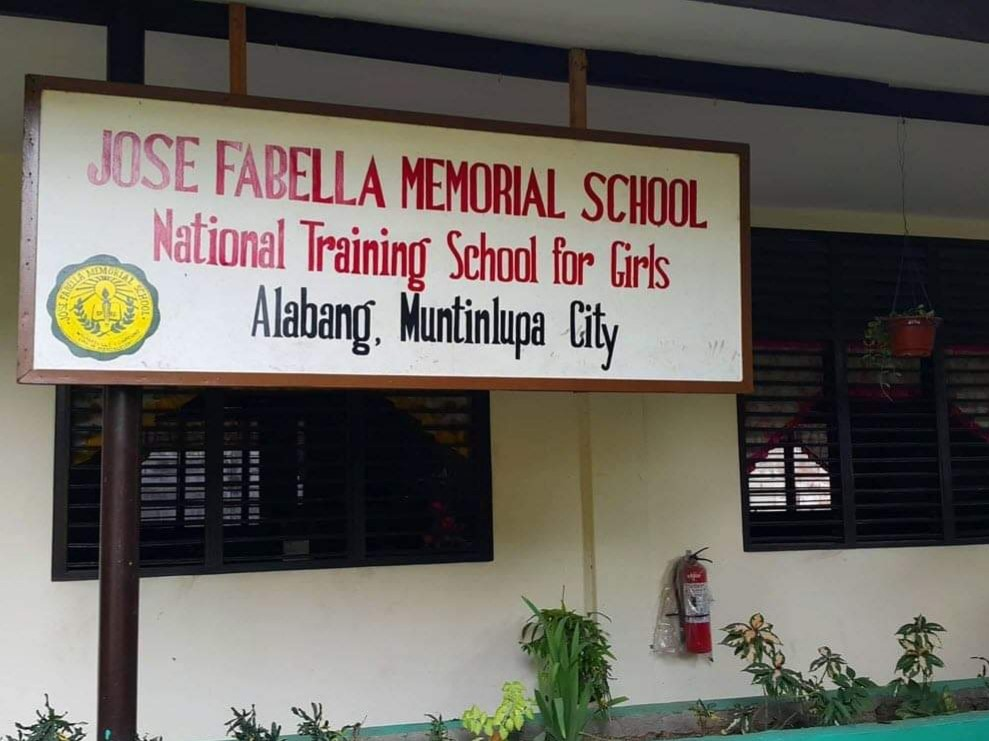
National Training School for Girls in Alabang, Muntinlupa

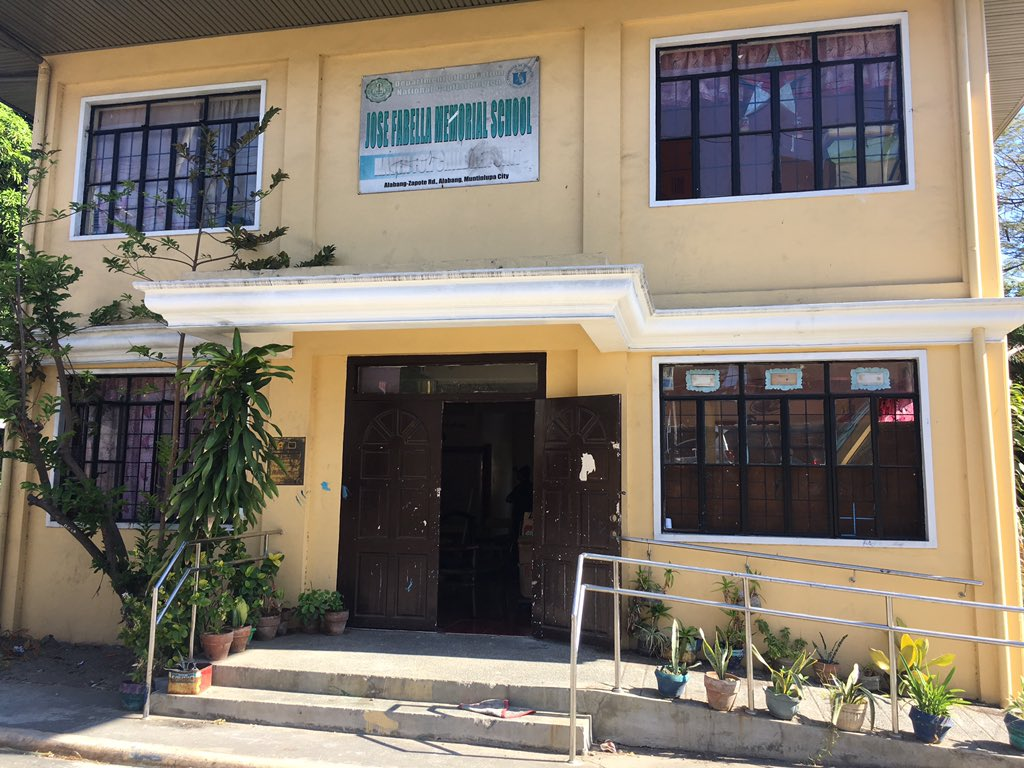
Haven for Children in Alabang, Muntinlupa

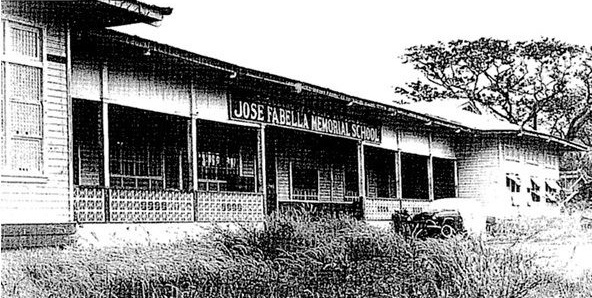
Former Gabaldon building, ca. 1980s
