= List of hospitals in Metro Manila =

The following is a list of notable hospitals in Metro Manila, Philippines.

== Manila ==
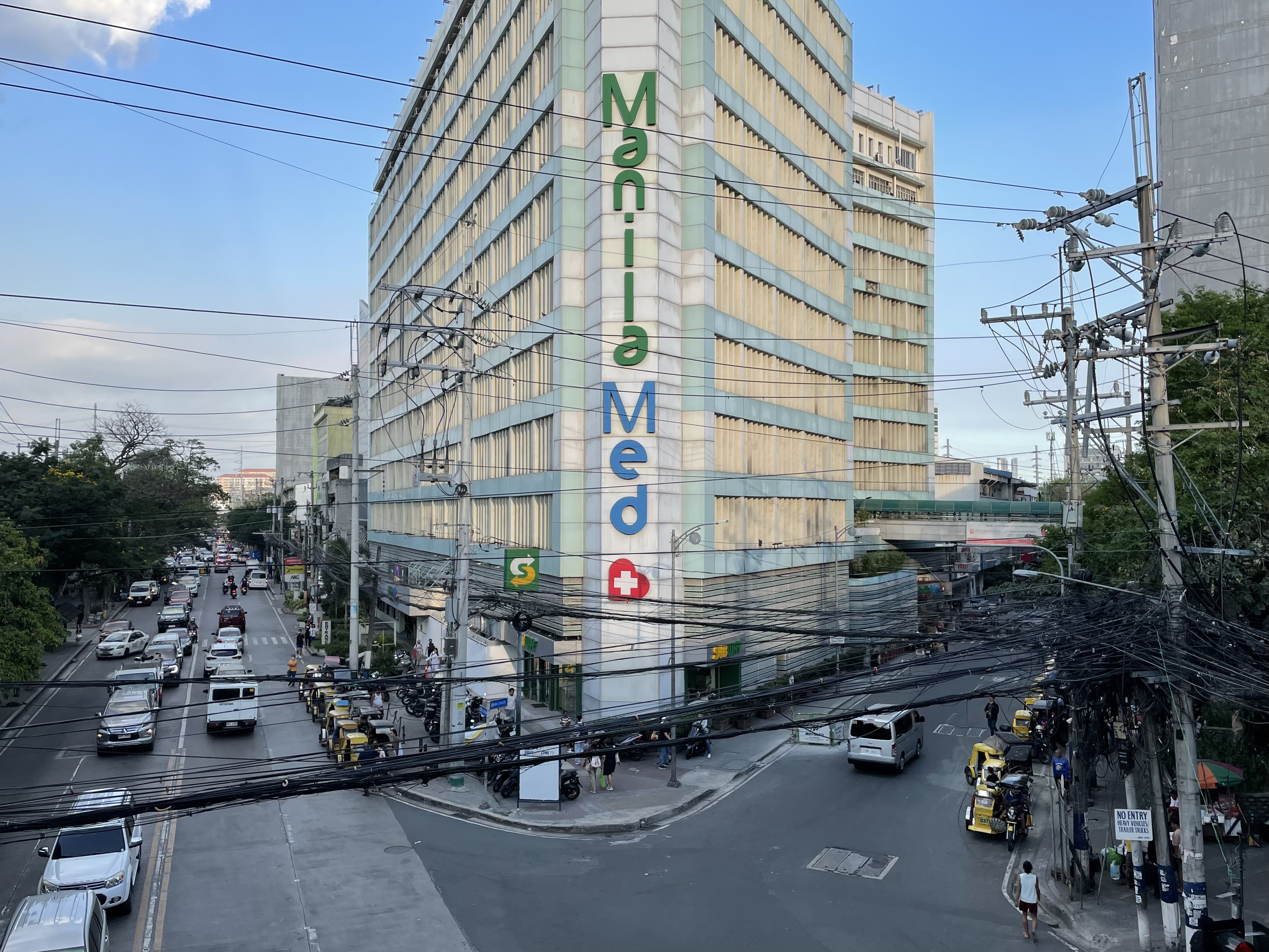
ManilaMed (formerly Medical Center Manila) in 2026

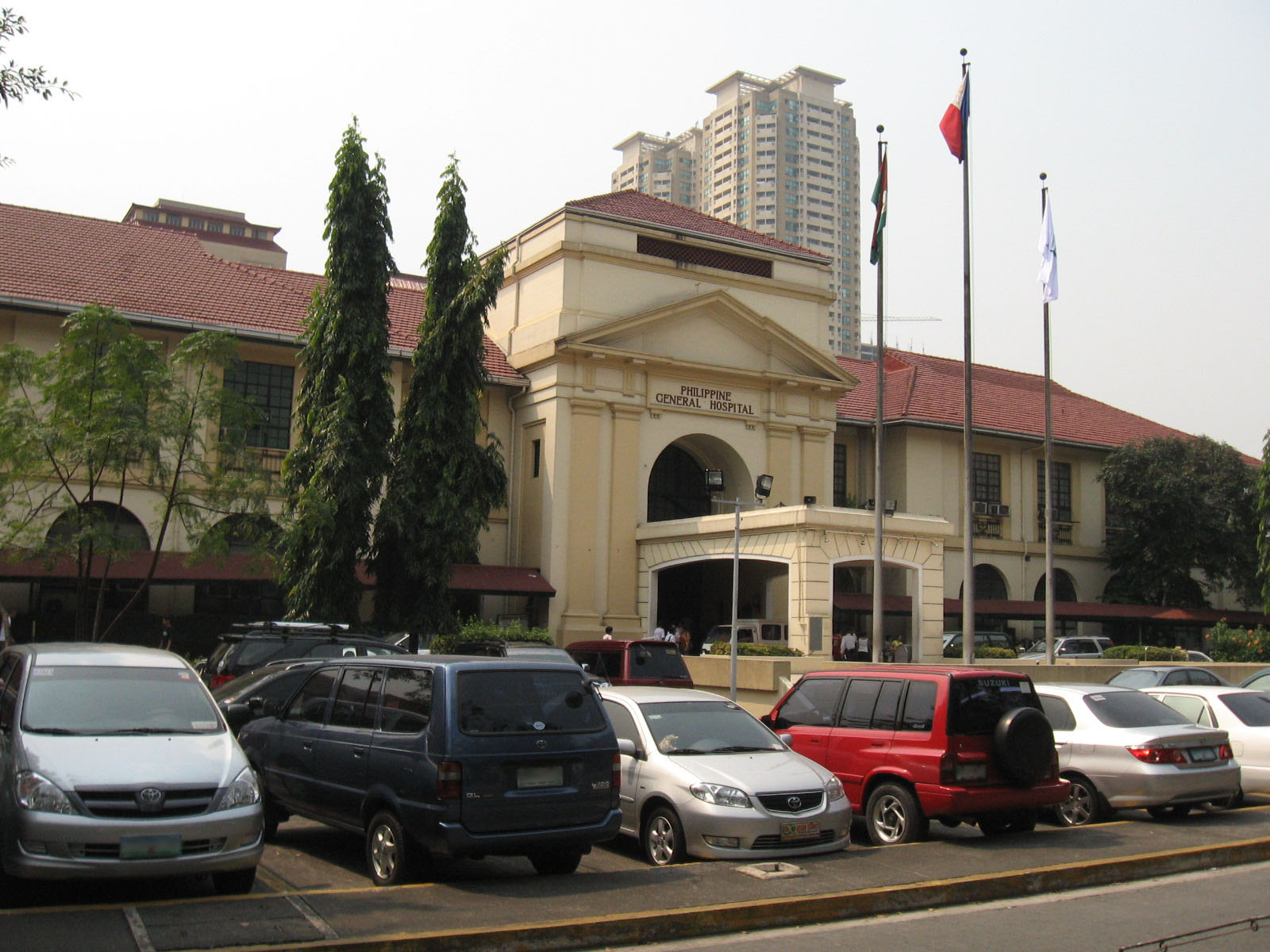
Philippine General Hospital

- Amisola Maternity Hospital – Hermosa Street, Manuguit, Tondo
- Canossa Health and Social Center Foundation, Inc. – E. Jacinto Street, Magsaysay Village, Tondo
- Chinese General Hospital and Medical Center – Blumentritt Road, Santa Cruz
- Clinica Arellano General Hospital – Doroteo Jose Street, Santa Cruz
- De Ocampo Memorial Medical Center – Nagtahan Street, Santa Mesa
- Dr. Jose Fabella Memorial Hospital – Lope de Vega Street, Santa Cruz
- Dr. Mirando Unciano, Sr. Medical Center – V. Mapa Street, Santa Mesa
- Esperanza Health Center – Santa Mesa
- F. Lanuza Health Center and Lying–in Clinic – Alvarez Street, Santa Cruz
- GAT Andres Bonifacio Memorial Medical Center – Delpan Street, Tondo
- Hospital of the Infant Jesus – Laong Laan Street, Sampaloc
- Jose R. Reyes Memorial Medical Center – San Lazaro Compound, Rizal Avenue, Santa Cruz
- Justice Jose Abad Santos General Hospital – Numancia St. Binondo Manila
- Manila Doctors Hospital – 667 United Nations Avenue, Ermita
- Maria Clara Health Center and Lying–in Clinic – Maria Clara corner Prudencio Streets, Sampaloc
- Mary Chiles General Hospital – Dalupan Street, Sampaloc
- Mary Johnston Hospital – Juan Nolasco Street, Tondo
- ManilaMed* (formerly Medical Center Manila) – General Luna Street, Ermita
- Metropolitan Medical Center – Masangkay Street, Tondo
- New Manila District Hospital – Pad. Peo, Santa Cruz
- Nephrology Center of Manila – San Andres Street corner Leon Guinto Street, Malate
- Ospital ng Maynila Medical Center – Quirino Avenue corner Roxas Boulevard, Malate
- Ospital ng Sampaloc – Geronimo Street, Sampaloc
- Ospital ng Tondo – Jose Abad Santos Avenue, Tondo
- Our Lady of Lourdes Hospital – P. Sanchez Street, Santa Mesa
- Pedro Gil Health Center and Lying–in Clinic – A. Francisco Street corner Perlita Street, San Andres
- Perpetual Help Hospital – Laong Laan Street, Sampaloc
- Perpetual Succor Hospital – Cayco Street, Sampaloc
- Philippine General Hospital – Taft Avenue, Ermita
- Presidential Security Group Station Hospital – Malacañang Park
- Saint Jude Hospital and Medical Center – Don Quijote corner Dimasalang Streets, Sampaloc
- San Lazaro Hospital – Quiricada Street, Santa Cruz
- Santa Ana Hospital – New Panaderos Street, Santa Ana
- Seamen's Hospital – Cabildo corner San Jose Streets, Intramuros
- The Family Clinic, Inc. – Maria Clara Street, Sampaloc
- Tondo Foreshore Health Center – Pacheco Street corner Santa Fe Street, Tondo
- Tondo Health Center – Gagalangin, Tondo
- Tondo Medical Center – Kalakal Street, Balut, Tondo
- Trinity Woman and Child Center "The Birthplace" – New Panaderos Street, Santa Ana
- Unciano General Hospital
- United Doctors Medical Center – near Mabuhay Rotonda
- University of Santo Tomas Hospital – Arsenio Lacson Avenue, Sampaloc

== Caloocan ==
- Acebedo General Hospital – Gen. Luis Street, Bagbaguin, JRM
- Baesa Advent Polyclinic and General Hospital – Retiro Street corner Baesa Road
- Bazarte Well Family Midlife Clinic – San Isidro, Camarin
- Col. Salvador T. Villa Memorial Hospital – Caimito Road
- Committee of German Doctors – Phase 8A, Bagong Silang
- Dante's Well Family Midlife Clinic – Bagong Silang
- Dr. Jose N. Rodriguez Memorial Hospital – Administration Site, Tala
- Fernandez General Hospital – F. Roxas, Grace Park
- Francisca dela Cruz Well Family Midwife Clinic – Caybiga
- Jean Demegillo Maternity and Lying–in Clinic – J. P. Ramoy Street, Talipapa
- John Paul Hospital – M. Ponce Street, Tirad Pass
- Lady of Lourdes Hospital of Caybiga, Inc. – Caybiga
- MCU–Filemon Dionisio Tanchoco Medical Foundation Hospital – EDSA
- Martinez Memorial Hospital – Mabini Street
- Nephrology Center of Caloocan Dialysis Center, Inc. – Barangay 86, District II, Calaanan East
- Nodado General Hospital – Area A, Camarin
- North Caloocan Doctors Hospital – Bangkers Village 2, Quirino Highway
- Our Lady of Grace Hospital – 8th Avenue corner F. Roxas Street, Grace Park
- President Diosdado Macapagal Memorial Medical Center – Mabini Street
- Ronn–Carmel Hospital and Fertility Control Center – Ponce Street
- San Lorenzo General Hospital – Barangay 170, Zone 15, Deparo
- Fabella

== Las Piñas ==
- Perpetual Help Medical Center - Alabang-Zapote Road, Brgy. Pamplona III
- Las Piñas Doctors Hospital - J. Aguilar Avenue, Brgy. Pulanglupa II
- Las Piñas General Hospital and Satellite Trauma Center - Brgy. Pulanglupa II
- Pope John Paul II Hospital and Medical Center - Alabang-Zapote Road, Brgy. Talon I
- Las Piñas City Medical Center - Marcos Alvarez Avenue, Brgy. Talon I
- Christ the King Medical Center - Unihealth Las Piñas - Alabang-Zapote Road, Brgy. Pamplona II
- Pamplona Hospital & Medical Center - Alabang-Zapote Road, Brgy. Pamplona I

== Makati ==
- Centuria Medical Makati
- Makati Life Medical Center – Bel-Air, Makati
- Makati Medical Center – Amorsolo Street, Legazpi Village
- St. Claire's Medical Center – Dian Street cor. Boyle Street, Palanan

== Malabon ==
- Malabon Hospital and Medical Center
- Ospital ng Malabon
- San Lorenzo Ruiz General Hospital

== Mandaluyong ==
- Asia Renal Care Philippines, Inc. – EDSA corner Reliance Street
- Jocson Well Family Midwife Clinic – Barangka Drive, Barangka
- Health Delivery Systems, Inc. (UNILAB DOTS Center) – Shaw Boulevard
- Mandaluyong City Medical Center – Boni Avenue
- National Center for Mental Health – Nueve de Pebrero Street
- Nephro Systems Philippines, Inc. – Eastgate Center, EDSA
- Perez–Mendoza Birthplace Lying–in Clinic – Blue Mansion Building, Boni Avenue
- Unciano General Hospital (Mandaluyong Branch) – Boni Avenue
- Victor R. Potenciano Medical Center – EDSA
- Divine Mercy The Home That Cares Inc. Psychiatric Custodial Hospital – Boni Avenue

== Marikina ==
St. Vincent General Hospital

- Amang Rodriguez Memorial Medical Center – Sumulong Highway, Santo Niño
- Garcia General Hospital – Bayan-Bayanan Avenue, Marikina Heights
- Immaculate Concepcion Hospital – Katipunan Street, Concepcion Dos
- Marikina Doctors Hospital and Medical Center – Evangelista Avenue, Calumpang
- Marikina Valley Medical Center – Sumulong Highway, Santo Niño
- Noah Medical Center – J. P. Rizal Street, Nangka
- San Ramon Hospital – General Ordoñez Avenue, Marikina Heights
- SDS Medical Center, Inc. – Katipunan Street, Concepcion Dos
- St. Anthony Medical Center – Gil Fernando Avenue, San Roque
- St. Victoria Hospital – J. P. Rizal Street, Santo Niño
- St. Vincent General Hospital – Bayan-Bayanan Avenue, Concepcion Uno
- VT Maternity Hospital – Guerilla Street, Santo Niño

== Muntinlupa ==
- Alabang Medical Center – Alabang–Zapote Road
- Alabang Medical Clinic–Muntinlupa Branch – National Highway, Putatan, Muntinlupa
- Asian Hospital and Medical Center – Civic Drive, Filinvest City, Alabang
- Babaran–Echavez Medical and Psychiatric Clinic – Amparo Street, Poblacion, Muntinlupa
- Beato Cauilan Hospital – Villa Carolina, National Highway
- Clinic Systems, Inc. – Montillano Street, Alabang
- League of Government Information Practitioners of the Philippines, Inc. – Alabang
- Medical Center Muntinlupa – National Road, Putatan, Muntinlupa
- New Bilibid Prisons Hospital – Bureau of Corrections (Philippines)
- Ospital ng Muntinlupa – Filinvest Civic Drive, Filinvest City, Alabang
- Research Institute for Tropical Medicine – Filinvest City, Alabang
- San Roque Medical Clinic – Montillano Street, Alabang

== Parañaque ==
- Medical Center Paranaque – Dr. A. Santos Avenue, Sucat Road
- Olivarez General Hospital – Dr. A. Santos Avenue, Sucat Road
- Ospital ng Parañaque – Quirino Avenue, La Huerta, Parañaque
- Our Lady of Peace Hospital – Coastal Road, San Dionisio, Parañaque
- Protacio Medical Services – Quirino Avenue, Tambo, Parañaque
- South Superhighway Medical Center – West Service Road, South Superhighway
- Sta. Rita de Baclaran Hospital – G. Cruz Street, Baclaran
- Sto. Niño de Cebu Maternity Hospital – Sucat Road
- UHBI – Parañaque Doctors' Hospital – Doña Soledad Avenue, Better Living Subdivision
- Unihealth Paranaque Hospital and Medical Center – Dr. A. Santos Avenue, Sucat Road (front of San Antonio Valley 1 Village)

== Pasay ==
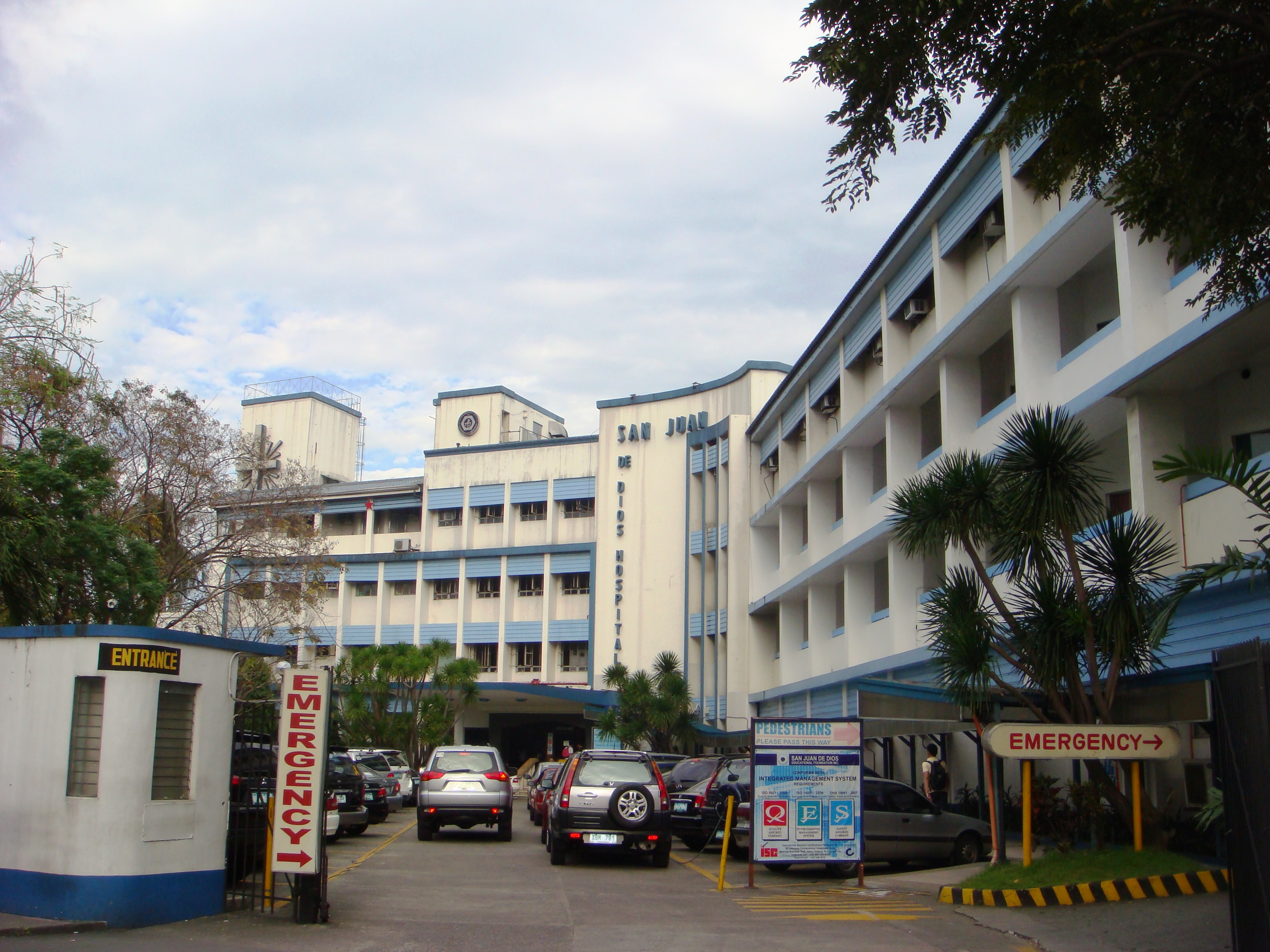
San Juan de Dios Hospital

- Adventist Medical Center Manila – Donada Street
- Metro Pasay Hospital and Medical Center – 808 M. Dela Cruz Extension
- Pasay City General Hospital – P. Burgos Street
- San Juan de Dios Hospital – 2772 Roxas Boulevard

== Pasig ==
- Alfonso Specialist Hospital – P. Sixto Antonio Avenue
- Glen Eagles Healthcare – San Miguel Avenue, Ortigas Center
- Health Solutions Corporation – San Miguel Avenue, Ortigas Center
- Javillonar Clinic and Hospital – Dr. Pilapil Street, Sagad
- John F. Cotton Hospital – Ortigas Avenue
- Medcor Pasig Hospital and Medical Center – Santolan, 10 Evangelista St., Pasig, NCR, Philippines
- Metro Psych Facility – P. Sixto Antonio Avenue
- Mission Hospital – Ortigas Avenue, Rosario
- Mother Regina Hospital – Madona Street, Doña Juana Subdivision, Rosario
- Pasig City General Hospital – F. Legazpi Street, Maybunga
- Pasig Doctors Medical Center – 254 A. Rodriguez Avenue, Manggahan
- Pasig Medical and Maternity Hospital Foundation – London Street, Pasig Green Park, Manggahan
- Rizal Medical Center – Pasig Boulevard
- Sabater General Hospital – Caruncho Avenue
- Salve Regina General Hospital – Marcos Highway, De la Paz
- Saint Threse Hospital – C. Raymundo Avenue, Maybunga
- St. Camillus Medical Center, Amang Rodriguez Avenue, Santolan
- The Medical City – Ortigas Avenue
- Wellness Pro, Inc. – San Miguel Avenue corner Lourdes Street

== Pateros ==
- Allied Care Experts (ACE) Medical Center – Pateros, Inc. – 884 P. Herrera St., Aguho

== Quezon City ==
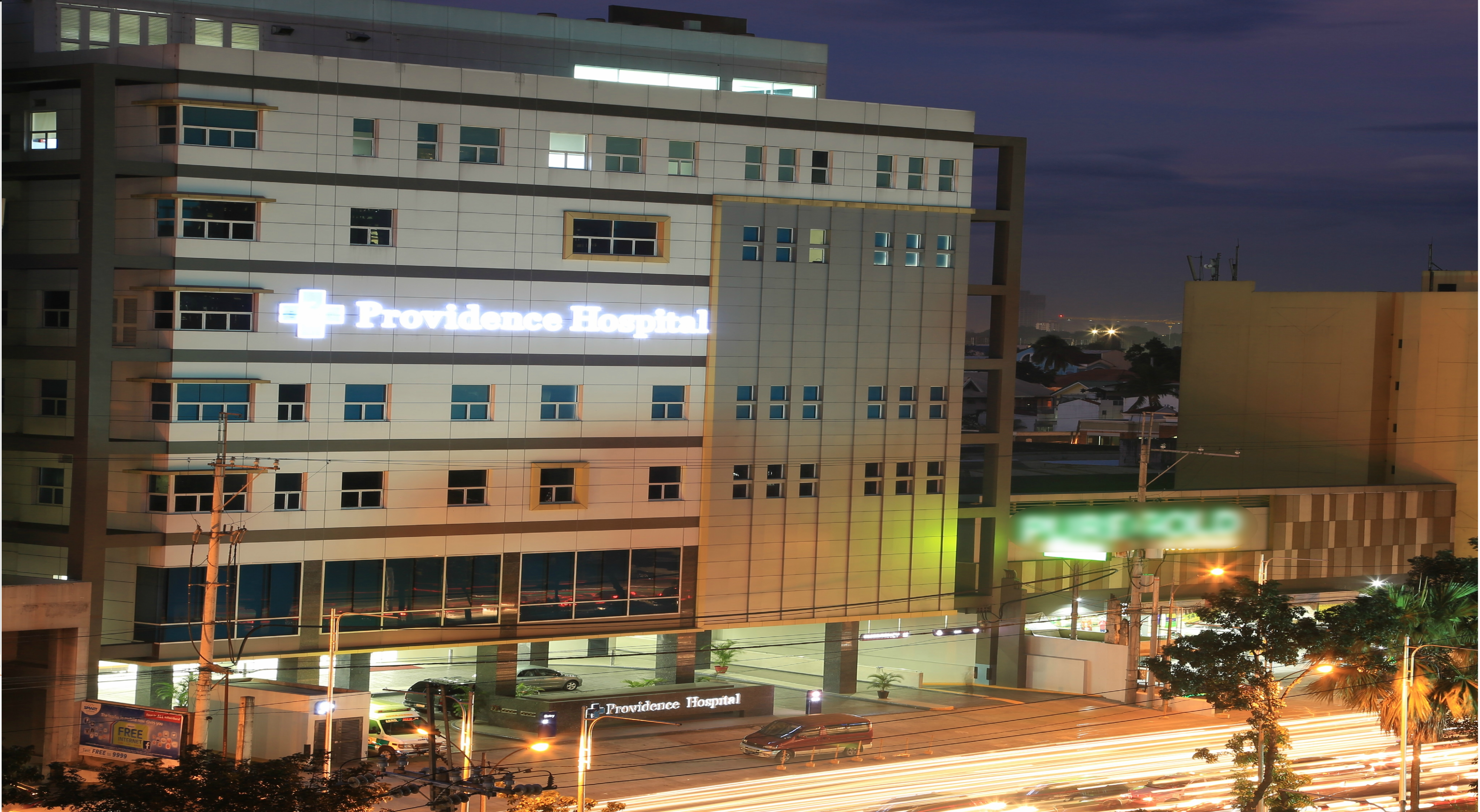
Providence Hospital - Quezon Ave.

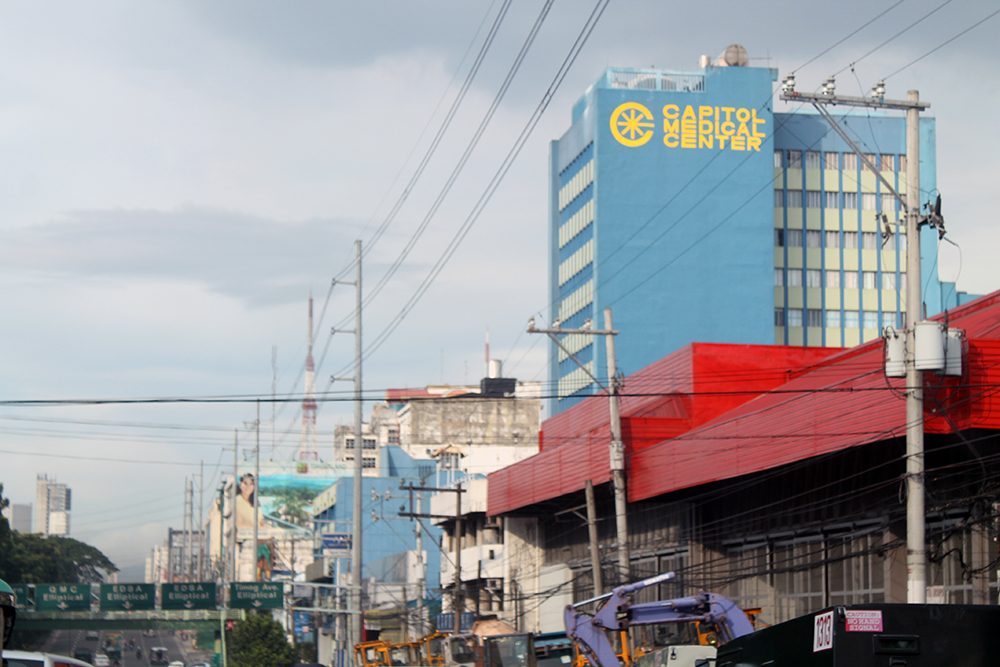
Capitol Medical Center

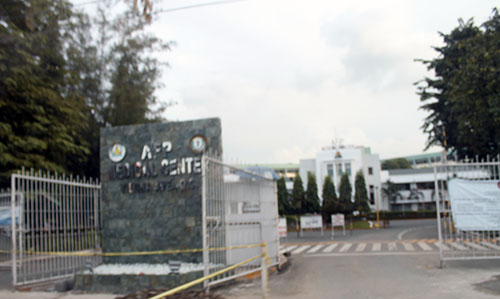
Armed Forces of the Philippines Medical Center

- Ann Francis Maternity Hospital – Quirino Highway, Novaliches
- AFP Medical Center – V. Luna Road, Barangay Central
- Bernardino General Hospital – Quirino Highway, San Bartolome, Novaliches
- Bernardino General Hospital II – Kaligayahan, Novaliches
- Camp General Emilio Aguinaldo Station Hospital – Camp General Emilio Aguinaldo (Camp Aguinaldo)
- Capitol Medical Center – Quezon Avenue corner Scout Magbanua Street, Diliman
- Casaul General Hospital – Tandang Sora Avenue, Sangandaan, Novaliches
- Commonwealth Hospital and Medical Center – Commonwealth Avenue
- Cruz–Dalida Maternity Hospital – Jordan Plain, Novaliches
- De Los Santos–STI Medical Center – E. Rodriguez Boulevard
- Dihmesco General Hospital – General Luna Street
- Diliman Doctors Hospital – Commonwealth Avenue
- Dr. Fe del Mundo Medical Center Foundation Philippines – Banawe Street
- Dr. Carlos Lanting Hospital – Novaliches
- Dr. Jesus C. Delgado Memorial Medical Center – Kamuning Road
- Dr. Montano Ramos General Hospital – Bukidnon Street, Bagong Bantay
- East Avenue Medical Center – East Avenue, Diliman
- Fairview General Hospital – Fairview Avenue corner Mercury Street, Fairview
- Far Eastern University – Nicanor Reyes Medical Foundation Medical Center – Regalado Avenue, West Fairview
- General Miguel Malvar Medical Foundation Hospital – Commonwealth Avenue
- J. P. Sioson General Hospital and Colleges, Inc. – Bukidnon Street, Bagong Bantay
- Lung Center of the Philippines – East Avenue
- National Children's Hospital – E. Rodriguez Boulevard
- National Kidney and Transplant Institute – East Avenue
- Neopolitan General Hospital – Quirino Highway, Lagro
- New Era General Hospital – Commonwealth Avenue, New Era
- Nodado General Hospital – Zabarte Subdivision, Kaligayahan, Novaliches
- Novaliches District Hospital – Quirino Highway, San Bartolome, Novaliches
- Novaliches General Hospital – Quirino Highway, Gulod, Novaliches
- OCW General Hospital – Tandang Sora Avenue, Culiat
- PNP General Hospital – Camp Crame, EDSA
- PNP General Hospital Annex – Camp Panopio B. Tuazon
- Pascual General Hospital – Baesa
- Philippine Children's Medical Center – Quezon Avenue
- Philippine Heart Center – East Avenue, Diliman
- Philippine Orthopedic Center – Maria Clara corner Banawe Streets, Santa Mesa Heights
- Philippine Oncology Center Corporation – Dahlia Street, West Fairview
- Providence Hospital – Quezon Ave., West Triangle
- Quezon City General Hospital – Seminary Road
- Queensberry Hospital – Ramirez Street, Novaliches
- Quezon Institute – E. Rodriguez Boulevard
- Quirino Memorial Medical Center – Project 4, P. Tuazon corner Katipunan Avenue
- St. Luke's Medical Center – E. Rodriguez Boulevard
- Saint Agnes General Hospital – Roosevelt Avenue
- San Lorenzo General Hospital – Pasong Putik, Novaliches
- Santa Teresita General Hospital – D. Tuazon Street
- United Doctors Medical Center – España Boulevard corner Ramirez Streets
- University of the East Ramon Magsaysay Memorial Medical Center – Aurora Boulevard
- University of the Philippines Medical Services – Diliman
- Valdez–Padron Hospital – Gulod, Novaliches
- Villarosa Hospital – Salalilla Street, Project 4
- Veterans Memorial Medical Center – North Diliman
- World Citi Medical Center – Aurora Boulevard

== San Juan ==
- Cardinal Santos Medical Center – Wilson Street, Greenhills West, Greenhills, San Juan
- Saint Martin de Porres Charity Hospital – A. Bonifacio Street
- San Juan Medical Center – N. Domingo Street

== Taguig ==
- Bicutan Medical Center – Manuel L. Quezon Street, New Lower Bicutan
- Cruz–Rabe General Hospital – General Luna Street, Tuktukan
- Dr. Sabili General Hospital and Health Services – General Santos Avenue, Lower Bicutan
- Holy Mary Family Hospital – Manuel L. Quezon Street, Bagumbayan, Taguig
- Jovince Medical Hospital – East Service Road, Western Bicutan
- St. Luke's Medical Center – Global City – Bonifacio Global City
- Manila Naval Hospital – Lawton Avenue, Bonifacio Naval Station, Fort Bonifacio
- Medical Center Taguig – Cayetano Boulevard, Ususan
- Ospital ng Makati - Sampaguita Street, Embo, Taguig
- Philippine Army General Hospital – General M. Castañeda Street, Fort Bonifacio
- Recuenco General Hospital - Sampaloc Extension, North Signal Village
- Taguig Doctors Hospital – Dr. A. Bunye Street, Bagumbayan, Taguig
- Taguig City General Hospital – C-6 Road, Hagonoy, Taguig
- Taguig–Pateros District Hospital – East Service Road, Western Bicutan

== Valenzuela ==
- Angelus Medical and Maternity Clinic – Que Grande Street, Ugong
- Calalang General Hospital – R. Valenzuela Street
- Carlos Clinic – Palasan Street
- Fatima Medical Center – MacArthur Highway
- F and P Hernandez Maternity and Lying–in Clinic – MacArthur Highway, Marulas
- Pasolo Maternity and Medical Clinic – Pasolo Street
- Saint John's Hospital – Malinta
- Sanctissimo Rosario General Hospital – Espiritu Street, Marulas
- Valenzuela City Emergency Hospital – Poblacion, Polo
- Valenzuela City General Hospital – Padrigal Street, Karuhatan
- Vian Family Hospital – Que Grande Street, Ugong

== See also ==
- List of hospitals in the Philippines
