= Department of Health (Philippines) =

Executive department of the Philippine government

- Kagawaran ng Kalusugan
- Seal

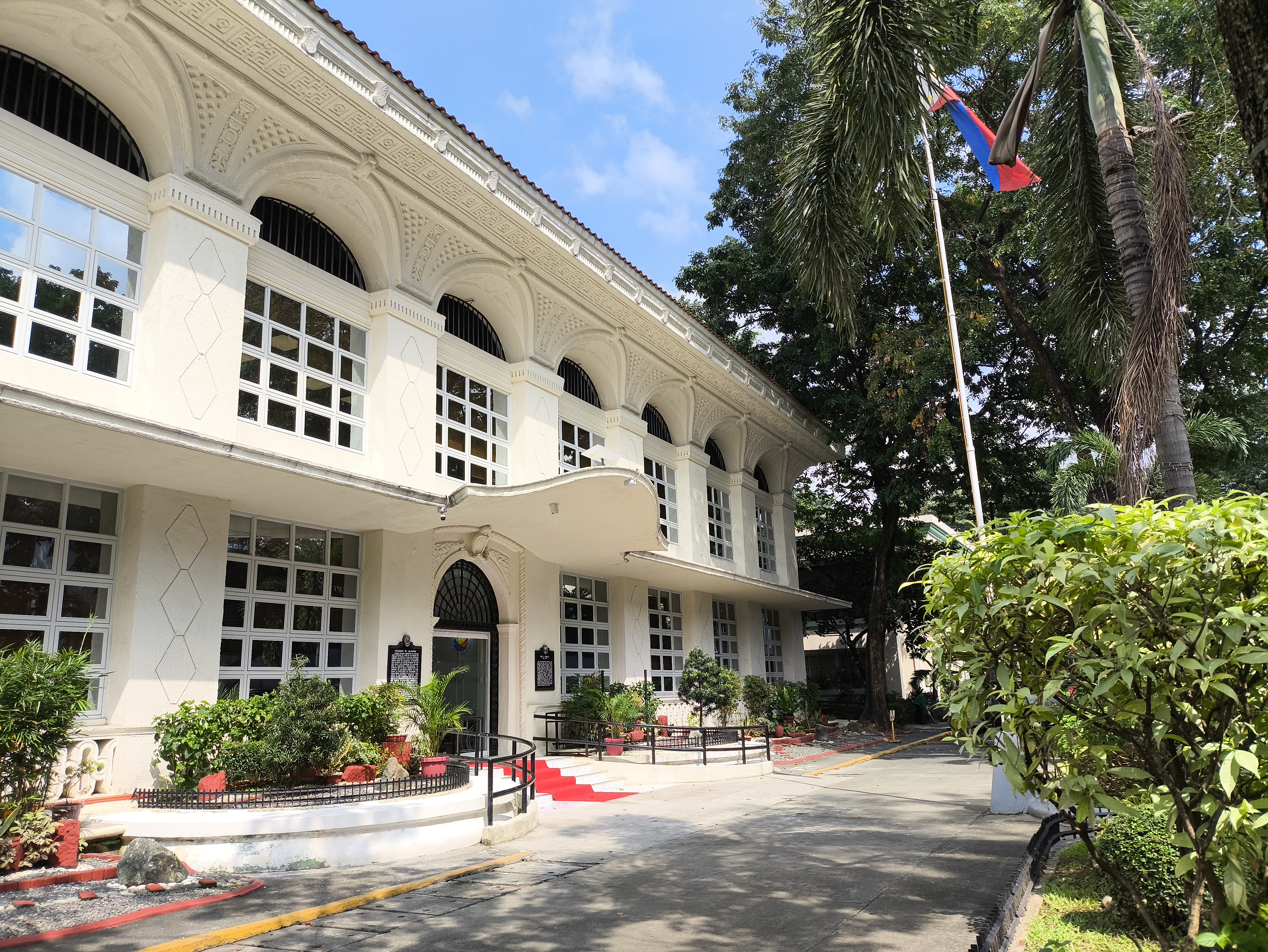
- Department of Health Central Office

Department overview
- Formed: September 10, 1898; 128 years ago
- Headquarters: San Lazaro Compound, Rizal Avenue, Santa Cruz, Manila; 14°36′55.95″N 120°58′54.99″E
- Motto: Floreat Salubritas Populi ("Promotion of Health for the People")
- Employees: 76,830 (2024)
- Annual budget: ₱296.3 billion (2023) ▲
- Department executives: Edwin Mercado, Secretary of Health; Usec. Gloria J. Balboa, Senior Undersecretary; Asec. Albert Francis E. Domingo, Spokesperson
- Website: doh.gov.ph

The Department of Health (DOH; Filipino: Kagawaran ng Kalusugan) is the executive department of the Philippine government responsible for ensuring access to basic public health services by all Filipinos through the provision of quality health care, the regulation of all health services and products. It is the government's over-all technical authority on health. It has its headquarters at the San Lazaro Compound, along Rizal Avenue in Manila.

The current head of the department is Sec. Edwin Mercado. The health secretary is also a member of the Cabinet.

== History ==
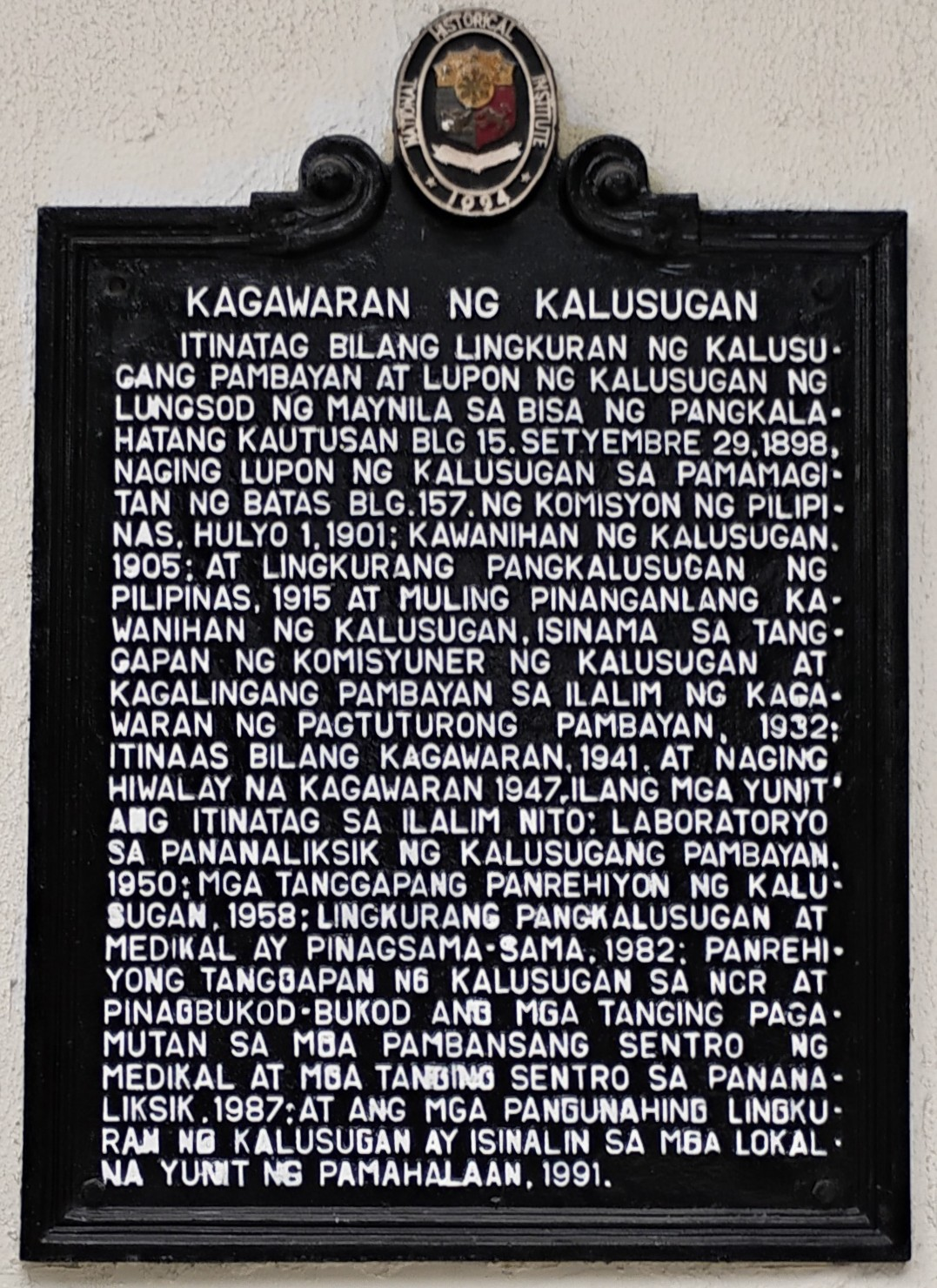
Department of Health (Kagawaran ng Kalusugan) Historical Marker

Americans assembled a military Board of Health on September 10, 1898, with its formal organization on September 29. Upon its creation, Dr. Frank S. Bourns is assigned as president while Dr. C. L. Mullins was assigned as assistant surgeon. The purpose of this Board of Health was to care for injured American troops but as hostilities between Filipinos and Americans waned in 1901, a civilian Board of Health was now deemed appropriate with Dr. Louis M. Maus as the first health commissioner.

In the early 1900s, 200,222 lives including 66,000 children were lost; three percent of the population was decimated in the worst epidemic in Philippine health history. In view of this, the Americans organized and erected several institutions, including the Bureau of Governmental Laboratories, which was built in 1901 for medical research and vaccine production.

The Americans, led by Dean Worcester built the UP College of Medicine and Surgery in 1905, with Johns Hopkins University serving as a blueprint, at the time, for one of the best medical schools in the world. By 1909, nursing instruction was also beginning at the Philippine Normal School. In terms of public health, Americans improved on the sewer system and provided a safer water supply.

In 1915, the Bureau of Health was reorganized and renamed into the Philippine Health Service. During the succeeding years leadership and a number of health institutions were already being given to Filipinos, in accordance with the Organic Act of 1916. On January 1, 1919, Dr. Vicente De Jesus became the first Filipino to head the Health portfolio.

In 1933, after a reorganization, the Philippine Health Service reverted to being known as the Bureau of Health. It was during this time that it pursued its official journal, The Health Messenger and established Community Health and Social Centers, precursors to today's Barangay Health Centers.

By 1936, as Governor-General Frank Murphy was assuming the post of United States High Commissioner, he would remark that the Philippines led all oriental countries in terms of health status.

When the Commonwealth of the Philippines was inaugurated, Dr. Jose F. Fabella was named chief of the Bureau of Health. In 1936, Dr. Fabella reviewed the Bureau of Health's organization and made an inventory of its existing facilities, which consisted of 11 community and social health centers, 38 hospitals, 215 puericulture centers, 374 sanitary divisions, 1,535 dispensaries and 72 laboratories.

In the 1940s, the Bureau of Health was reorganized into the Department of Health and Public Welfare, still under Fabella. During this time, the major priorities of the agency were tuberculosis, malnutrition, malaria, leprosy, gastrointestinal disease, and the high infant mortality rate.

When the Japanese occupied the Philippines, they dissolved the National Government and replaced it with the Central Administrative Organization of the Japanese Army. Health was relegated to the Department of Education, Health and Public Welfare under Commissioner Claro M. Recto.

In 1944, President Manuel Roxas signed Executive Order (E.O.) No. 94 into law, calling for the creation of the Department of Health. Dr. Antonio C. Villarama as appointed Secretary. A new Bureau of Hospitals and a Bureau of Quarantine was created under DOH. Under E.O. 94, the Institute of Nutrition was created in 1948 to coordinate various nutrition activities of the different agencies.

On February 20, 1958, Executive Order 288 provided for the reorganization of the Department of Health. This entailed a partial decentralization of powers and created eight Regional Health Offices. Under this setup, the Secretary of Health passed on some of responsibilities to the regional offices and directors.

One of the priorities of the Marcos administration was health maintenance. From 1975 to the mid-1980s, four specialty hospitals were built in succession. The first three institutions were spearheaded by First Lady Imelda Marcos. The Philippine Heart Center was established on February 14, 1975, with Dr. Avelino Aventura as director. Second, the Philippine Children's Medical Center was built in 1979. Then in 1983, the National Kidney and Transplant Institute was set up. This was soon followed by the Lung Center of the Philippines, which was constructed under the guidance of Health Minister Dr. Enrique Garcia.

With a shift to a parliamentary form of government, the Department of Health was transformed into the Ministry of Health on June 2, 1978, with Dr. Clemente S. Gatmaitan as the first health minister. On April 13, 1987, the Department of Health was created from the previous Ministry of Health with Dr. Alfredo R. A. Bengzon as secretary of health.

On December 17, 2016, Health Secretary Paulyn Jean Rossel-Ubial announced that in 2017 the government will start paying the hospital bills and medicines of poor Filipinos. She said that the Department of Health (DOH) is capable of taking care of the hospital bills and medicines of poor Filipinos owing to its bigger budget starting in 2017.

A total of ₱96.336 billion was allocated to the DOH in the 2017 national budget, which includes funds for the construction of additional health facilities and drug rehabilitation centers. Ubial said poor patients in government hospitals do not even have to present PhilHealth cards when they avail of assistance. She added that poor patients will no longer be billed by government hospitals.

Senator Loren Legarda, chair of the Senate committee on finance said that the proposed ₱3.35-trillion national budget for 2017 will provide healthcare assistance to all Filipinos, and an additional ₱3 billion was allocated to the Philippine Health Insurance Corporation (PhilHealth) to ensure coverage for all Filipinos. “The Department of Health (DOH) said there are some eight million Filipinos still not covered by PhilHealth. It is our duty, in serving the public, to extend basic healthcare protection to all our people. That is why we pushed for the augmentation of the PhilHealth’s budget so that in 2017, we achieve universal healthcare coverage,” she said. Legarda said universal healthcare coverage means that any non-member of PhilHealth will automatically be made a member upon availing of healthcare services in a public hospital.

=== Philippine government response to the COVID-19 pandemic ===
In early January 2020, the Philippines confirmed its first case of Novel coronavirus disease. Two months later, the Philippines implemented national lockdowns, mask mandate, and social distancing. In February 2021, COVID-19 vaccines reached the Philippines and began to be administered.

The Department of Health was criticized in a 2021 study saying that the Philippines was 2nd to the last in the world in terms by how effective the Philippine government did respond to the pandemic. It was heavily criticized by DOH Secretary Francisco Duque III.

== Attached agencies and hospitals ==
=== Attached agencies ===
The following agencies and councils are attached to the DOH for policy and program coordination:

- Food and Drug Administration (FDA)
- National Nutrition Council (NNC)
- Philippine Health Insurance Corporation (PHIC; PhilHealth)
- Philippine Institute for Traditional and Alternative Health Care (PITAHC)
- Philippine National AIDS Council (PNAC)

=== Retained hospitals ===
The following hospitals are directly under the DOH:

DOH Hospitals	Specialty Hospitals
Amang Rodriguez Medical Center; Amai Pakpak Medical Center; Bicol Medical Center; Davao Regional Medical Center; Dr. Jose Fabella Memorial Hospital; Corazon Locsin Montelibano Memorial Regional Hospital; East Avenue Medical Center; José R. Reyes Memorial Medical Center; Mayor Hilarion A. Ramiro Sr. Medical Center; National Center for Mental Health; National Children's Hospital; Northern Mindanao Medical Center; Philippine Orthopedic Center; Quirino Memorial Medical Center; Research Institute for Tropical Medicine; Rizal Medical Center; San Lazaro Hospital; Southern Philippines Medical Center; Tondo Medical Center; Baguio General Hospital and Medical Center; Maria L. Eleazar General Hospital; Joni Villanueva General Hospital; Lung Center of the Philippines; National Kidney and Transplant Institute; Philippine Children's Medical Center; Philippine Heart Center; Reproductive Health Clinic (9 branches)

== Statistics ==
=== Budget ===
View chart definition.
