= National Children's Hospital (Philippines) =

Government hospital in Quezon CIty, Philippines

- Department of Health
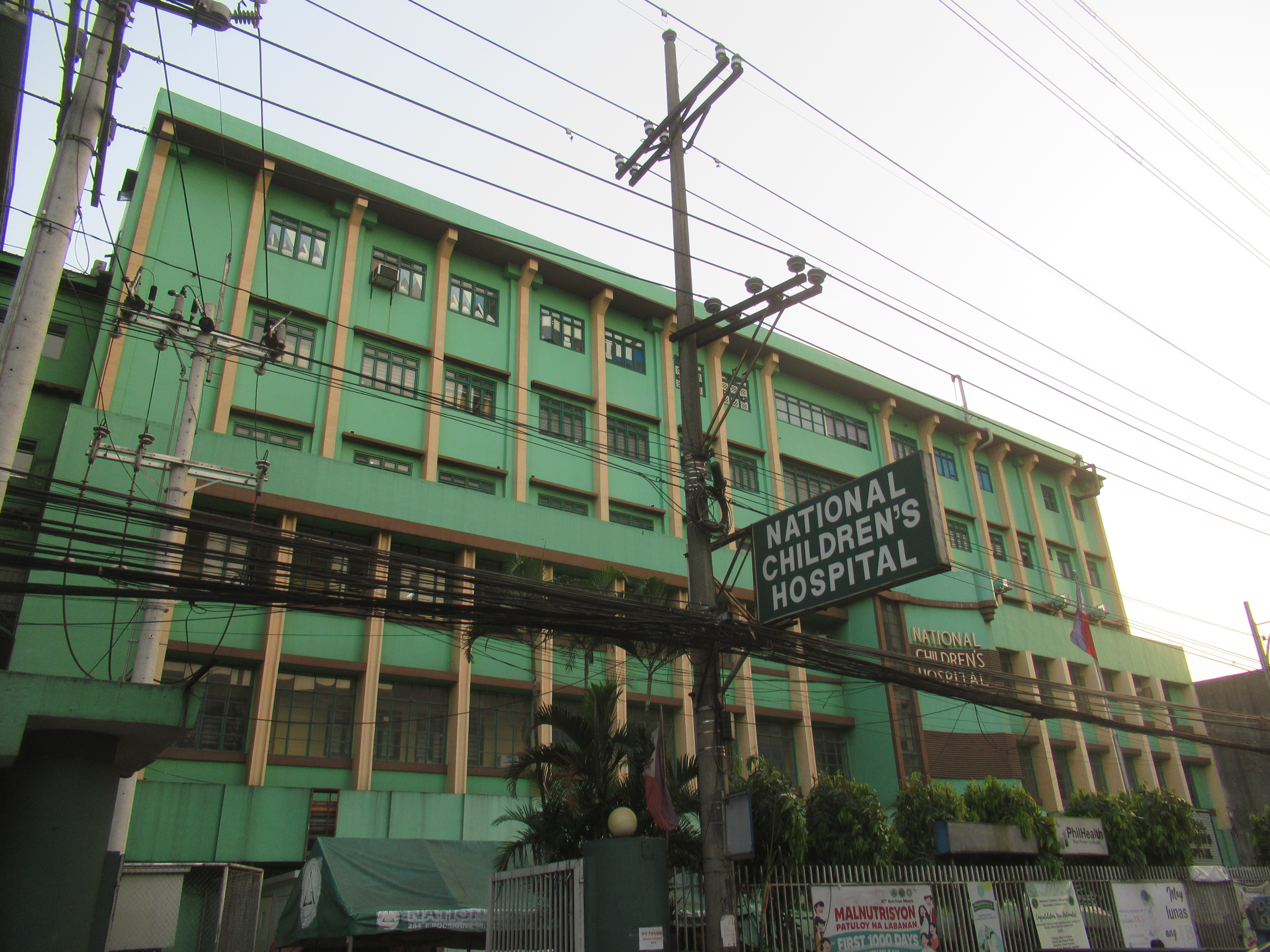

Geography
- Location: E. Rodriguez Sr. Avenue, Quezon City, Metro Manila, Philippines
- Coordinates: 14°37′13″N 121°01′15″E

Organization
- Type: Children's hospital

Services
- Beds: 250

History
- Former names: Indigent Children's Clinic (1945–1952); National Indigent Children's Hospital (1952–1955)
- Opened: February 11, 1945

Links
- Website: nch.doh.gov.ph
- Lists: Hospitals in the Philippines

The National Children's Hospital is a tertiary health facility in Quezon City, Metro Manila, Philippines. It is a 250-bed capacity training and specialty hospital.

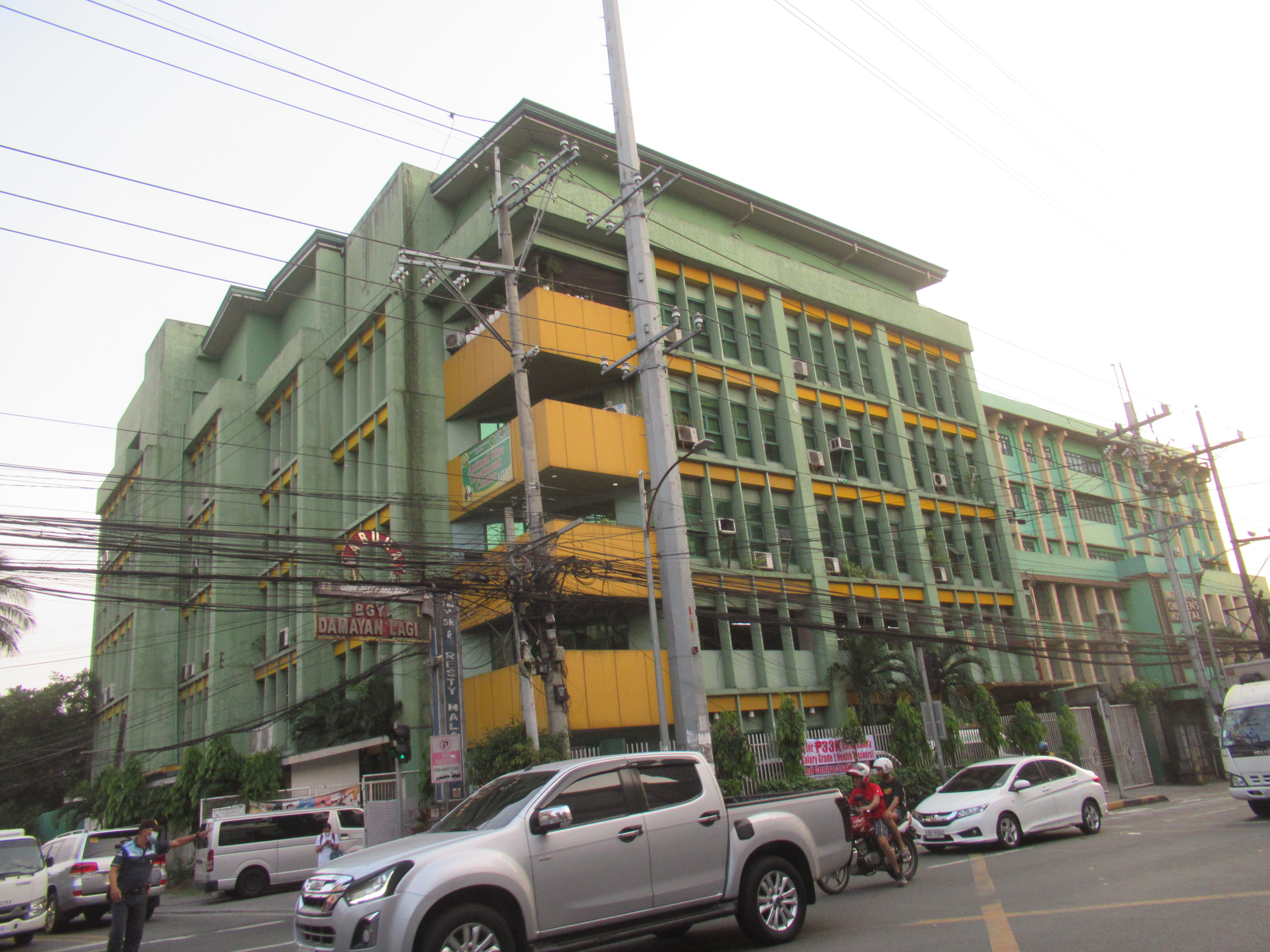
Facade in April 2023

== History ==
The National Children's Hospital (NCH) was established on February 11, 1945 as the Indigent Children's Clinic under the Emergency Civilian Administration and is intended to cater war refuges, the sick and undernourished children. It was initially located along San Rafael Street, Manila and had Victoria Kalaw-Linan as its first hospital director.

The health facility was moved to the España Extension (now E. Rodriguez Sr. Avenue) in Quezon City under Presidential Proclamation No. 43 issued in 1952 by President Elpidio Quirino. Under the Republic Act No. 731 which became law on June 18, 1952, the clinic became the National Indigent Children's Hospital.

The National Indigent Children's Hospital was abolished under Republic Act No. 1340 which was enacted as law in 1955 under the administration of President Ramon Magsaysay and was replaced by the National Children's Hospital.

Under NCH director Peregrino Paulino, the construction of a two-storey building for the hospital was realized on April 26, 1958. Under Director Isabelita S. Vital-Gozon's watch, the construction of 6-storey and 7-storey buildings for the NCH was made possible in 1993 and 2001 respectively.

== See also ==
- Philippine Children's Medical Center
