= Taguig–Pateros District Hospital =

Government hospital in Taguig, Philippines

Geography
- Location: East Service Road, Western Bicutan, Taguig, Metro Manila, Philippines
- Coordinates: 14°30′39″N 121°02′03″E

Organization
- Type: General

Services
- Beds: 100

History
- Opened: 1994

Links
- Lists: Hospitals in the Philippines

The Taguig–Pateros District Hospital (TPDH) is a public hospital located in Western Bicutan, Taguig, Philippines. It is classified as a Level 1 hospital by the Department of Health.

== History ==
The Taguig–Pateros District Hospital was established by virtue of Republic Act No. 7842, which was passed into law on December 16, 1994, as a 100-bed hospital under the Department of Health. The hospital was turned-over to the City of Taguig in September 2006 by virtue of Executive Order No, 567, s. 2006. It is one of the two city-owned hospital, the other being the Taguig City General Hospital.

In 2016, TPDH opened its intensive care unit (ICU), with 10 beds for adults, 6 for children, and 12 for newborns. In 2019, the Out-Patient Department of TPDH was inaugurated.

== Facilities ==
TPDH was expanded in 2022 with the construction of the Taguig Center for Women and Children, a new five-storey building that focuses on women and children's health, including chemotherapy and breast clinics, as well as a drop-in center for social hygiene. It contains the city's human milk bank.

== See also ==
- Taguig City General Hospital
