= Ospital ng Makati =

Government hospital in Taguig, Philippines

- City Government of Makati
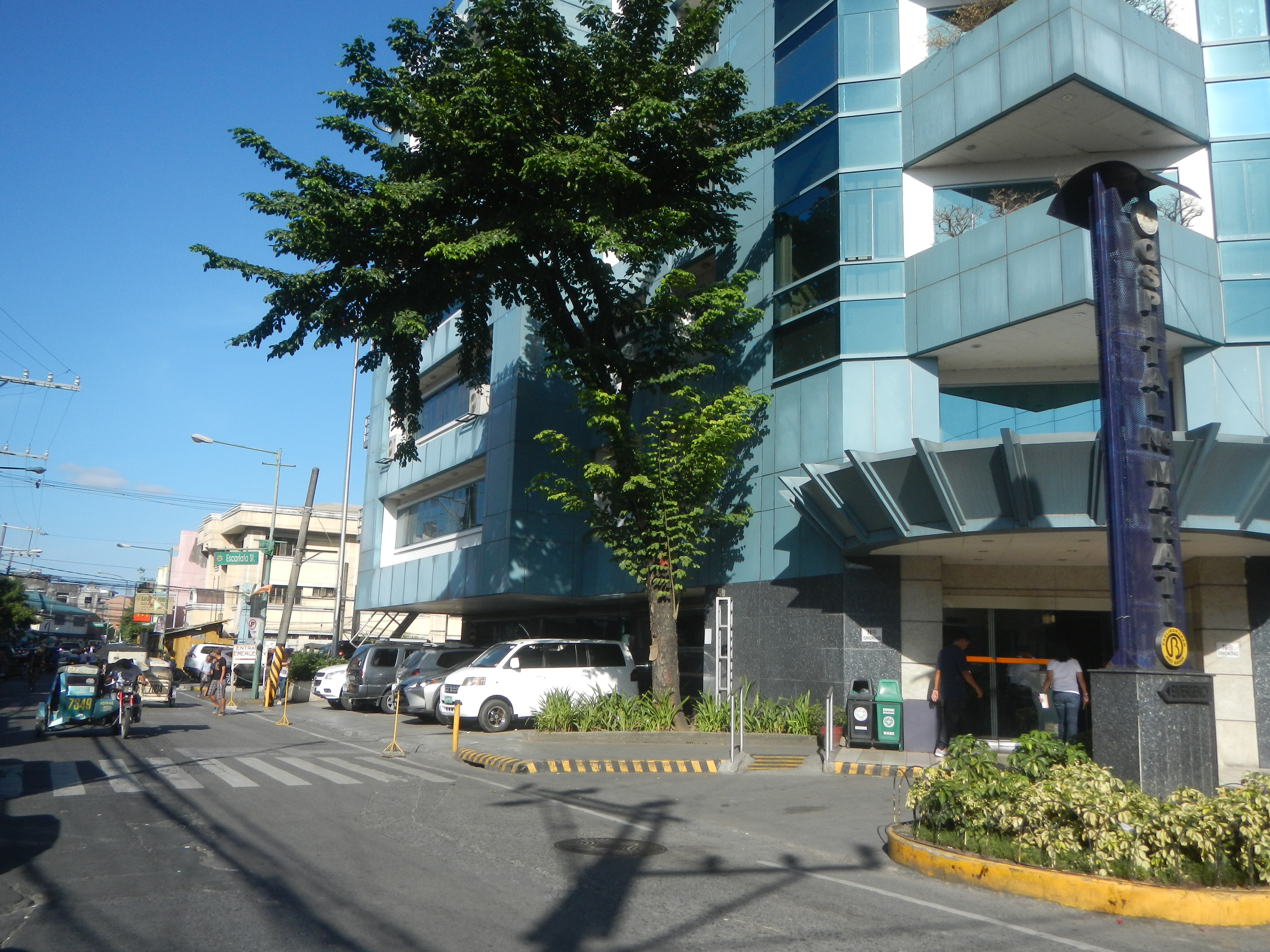
- Facade

Geography
- Location: Sampaguita Street cor. Dahlia and Gumamela Streets, Pembo, Taguig, Metro Manila, Philippines
- Coordinates: 14°32′47″N 121°03′43″E

Organization
- Care system: MHP Yellow card, Philheath accredited
- Type: General
- Affiliated university: Makati Life Medical Center, University of Makati

Services
- Emergency department: Level III
- Beds: 300

History
- Opened: 1988

Links
- Lists: Hospitals in the Philippines

The Ospital ng Makati (lit. 'Hospital of Makati'; abbreviated OsMak) is a tertiary hospital in located Pembo, Taguig.

Ownership of its land and hospital building are currently disputed between the cities of Makati and Taguig following the resolution of the Makati–Taguig territorial dispute which favors Taguig. The city government of Makati runs the hospital itself.

== History ==
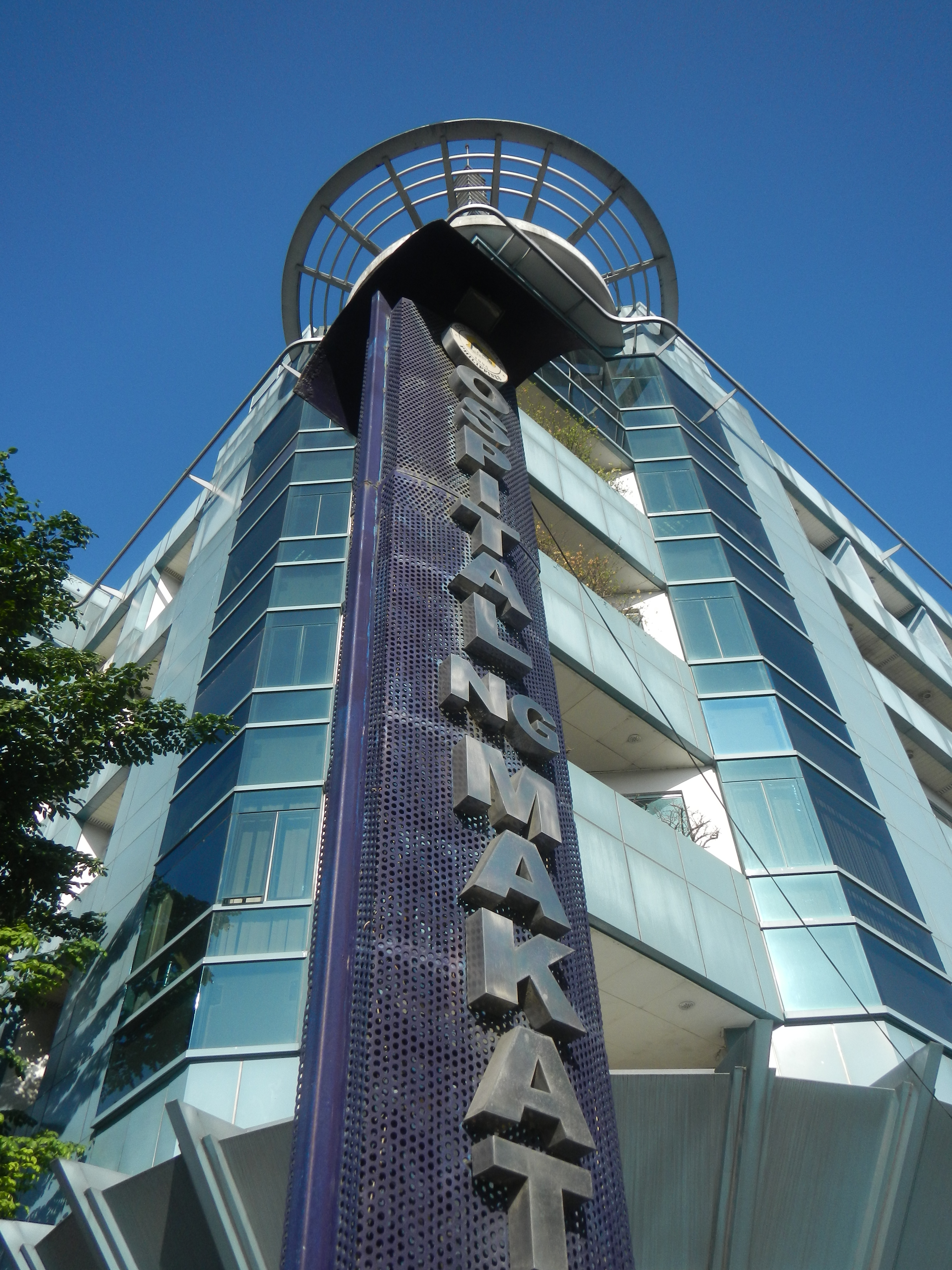
The Hospital Facade

The hospital was established in 1988, during the administration of then Makati Mayor Jejomar Binay. The hospital has a bed capacity of 300. It also has its own Eye Center. Following the Supreme Court ruling that asserted Taguig's territorial jurisdiction over the Embo barangays, the hospital became subject to ownership dispute.

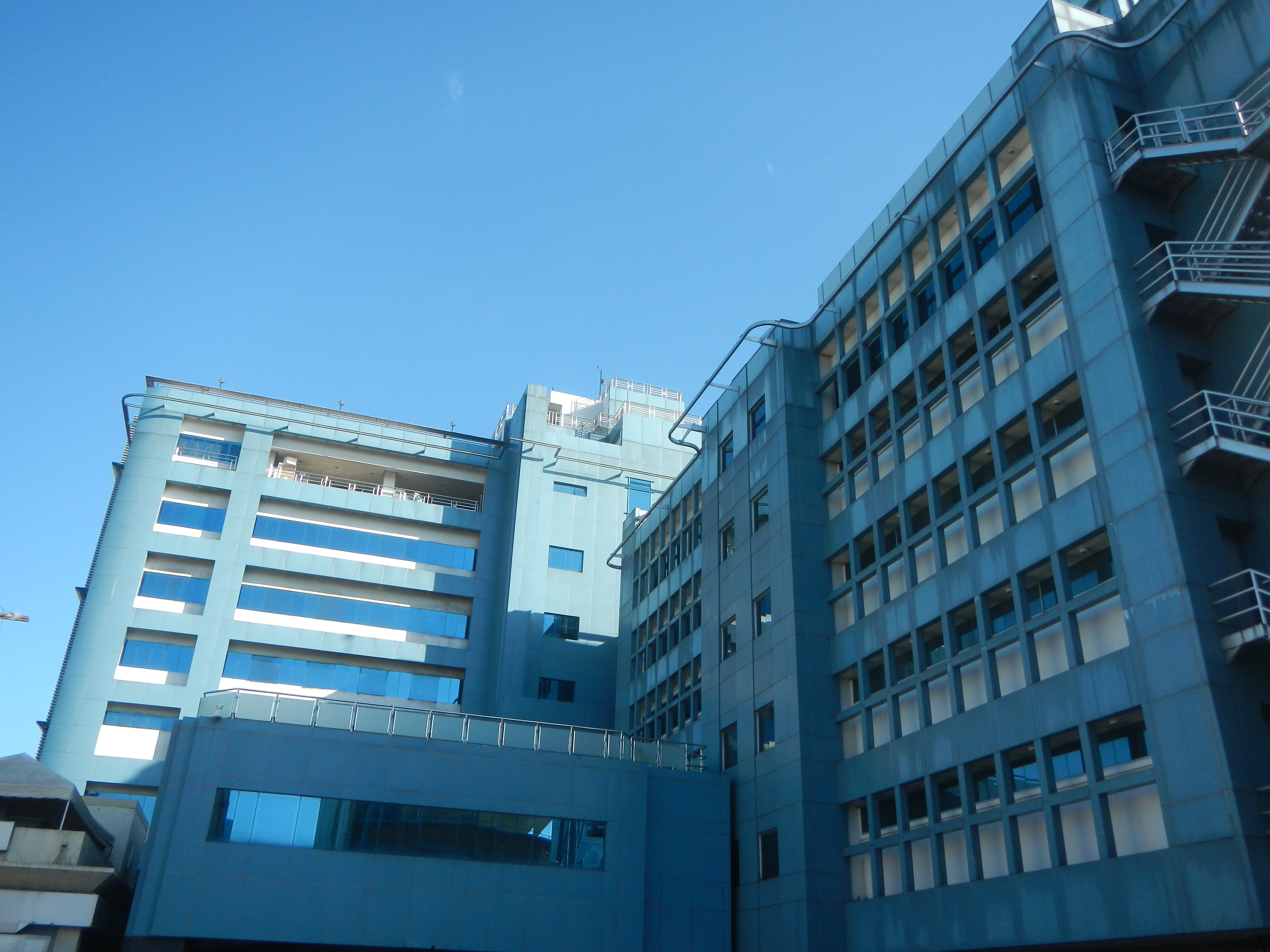
Ospital ng Makati Annex Building circa 2017

On September 25, 2023, Makati City Administrator Claro Certeza alleged that the Taguig City Government rejected the deals regarding the transfer of 8 health centers, the Ospital ng Makati, and patient data in the areas affected by the territorial dispute between the cities. The Makati City Government proposed a credit line for Taguig and offered Taguig the option to lease or purchase the facilities it built on the contested areas. However, Taguig countered the proposed deals and memorandums with Makati, asserting that the Makati City Government is acting on bad faith and their proposed deals were founded on the baseless claim that Makati owns the land and the health centers erected on it. Taguig also accused Makati of violating the agreement with the Department of Health (DOH), which stated that both Taguig and Makati shall not take up ownership of existing land and buildings while the transition discussions are ongoing.

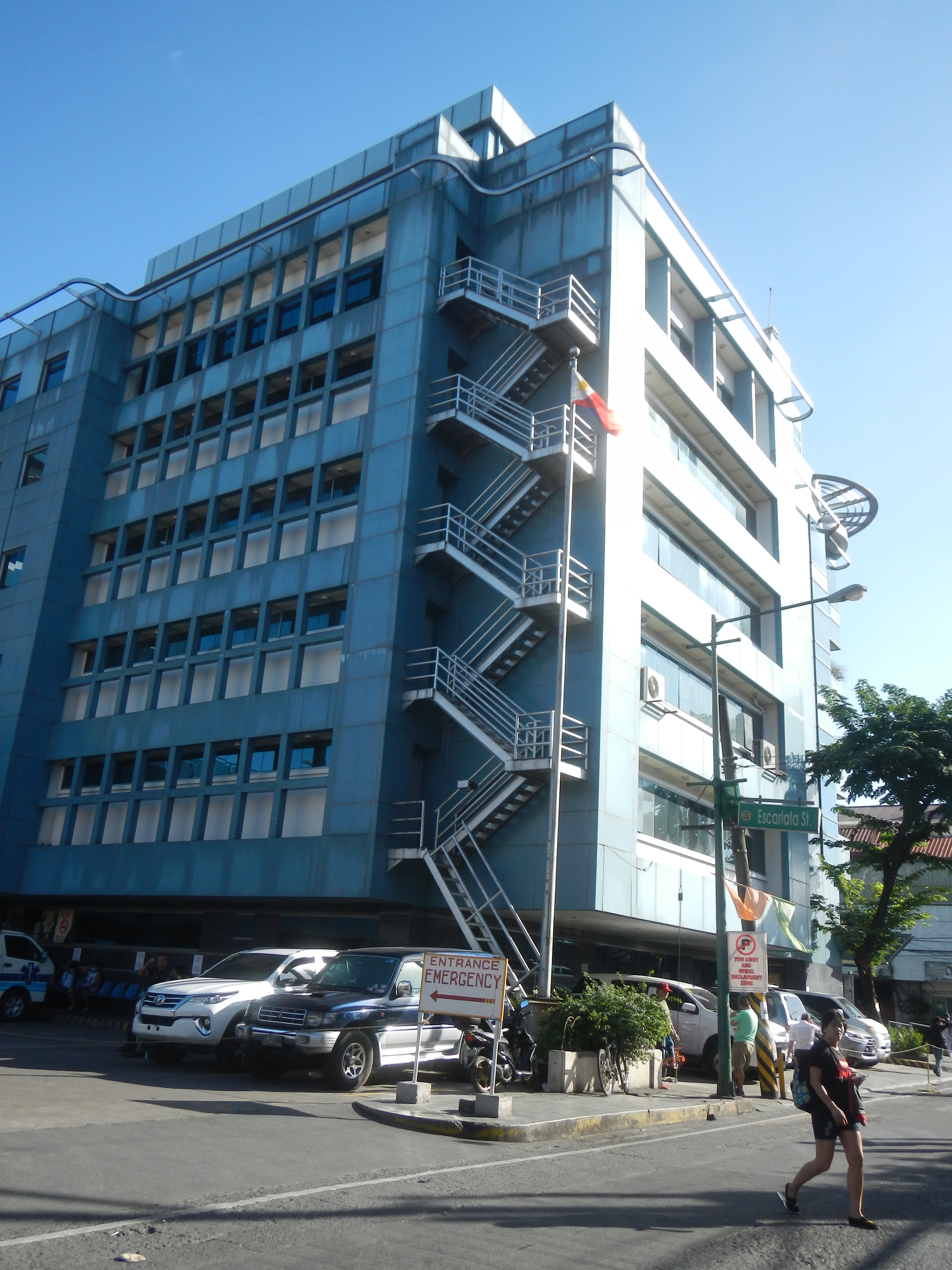
Ospital ng Makati Main Building circa 2017

In response to a query from DOH Secretary Ted Herbosa who sought to determine whether the Supreme Court's 2023 ruling also transferred ownership of the buildings and structures located in the Embo barangays, the Department of Justice (DOJ) said in a legal opinion that buildings and structures located in the said barangays previously part of Makati are under the jurisdiction of Taguig.

As of March 2025, the Makati city government still manages the hospital despite the ownership and management dispute and Makati no longer subsidizing healthcare for Embo residents.

== Finance ==
The Makati city government allotted a budget of ₱2.36 billion for the hospital in 2024.

== Facilities ==
The Department of Health classifies the Ospital ng Makati as a Level 3 hospital. It has a bed capacity for 300 people, has a blood bank and an ambulatory surgical clinic.

== Affiliate hospital ==
In 2021, the Makati city government announced plans to construct the Ospital ng Makati 2. This hospital was opened in 2023 in Bel-Air as the Makati Life Medical Center.
