= Joni Villanueva General Hospital =

Government hospital in Bulacan, Philippines

Geography
- Location: Igulot, Bocaue, Bulacan, Central Luzon, Philippines
- Coordinates: 14°47′48″N 120°56′37″E

Organization
- Type: General

Services
- Beds: 100

History
- Constructed: 2018
- Founded: December 12, 2022

Links
- Website: jvgh.doh.gov.ph Appoint-Q Portal

The Joni Villanueva General Hospital is a government hospital in the Philippines. It is located in barangay Igulot, Bocaue, Bulacan.

== History ==
The facility started as the vision of Senator Joel Villanueva and Mayor Joni Villanueva-Tugna as they narrate that the people of Bocaue dream of having a public hospital in their municipality. A total lot area of 9,425 square meters near the Philippine Arena was donated by the Villanueva Family to fulfill this aspiration of putting up the first government hospital in the municipality of Bocaue. In 2017, this dream further took shape with the allocation of Php 75 million (Php 50 million for Phase I and Php 25 million for Phase II) under the Health Facilities Enhancement Program (HFEP). Phase I Construction began on 2017 December 27. It was structurally designed as a three (3) storey building, with a minimum capacity of one hundred (100) beds. Initially named as the Bocaue Public Hospital, it had its groundbreaking ceremony last 2018 July 16 and was envisioned as a hospital extension of the Jose B. Lingad Memorial General Hospital (JBLMGH), either as a trauma-capable or a trauma- receiving facility.

Further allocation in 2019 (Php 115 million for Phase III) and in 2020 (Php 50 million for Phase IV) was provided for the continuous infrastructure works for the establishment of a hospital. On the other hand, an amount of Php 65 million was provided to procure hospital equipment. On 2021 May 28, the hospital was inaugurated as the Joaquin Villanueva Medical Center, named after the grandfather of Senator Joel Villanueva, a veteran of World War II and an olympic sprinter who represented the country at the Far Eastern Games for four consecutive years in the 1920s. The date – May 28 – was chosen in commemoration of the death anniversary of Mayor Joni Villanueva-Tugna who was serving her second term as Mayor of Bocaue when she died the year before. Construction of the first four phases of the facility was completed in September 8, 2021. During this time, with the ongoing COVID-19 pandemic, it served as a Hospital Extension Facility of JBLMGH under the name, Jose B. Lingad Memorial General Hospital – COVID-19 Field Extension with license number No. 03-0001-22-H3-1 with extended validity until 2022 December 17.

On 2022 April 29, President Rodrigo Roa Duterte approved and signed into law Republic Act (RA) No. 11720: An Act Establishing in the Municipality of Bocaue, Province of Bulacan, a General Hospital to Be Known as the Joni Villanueva General Hospital, and Appropriating Funds Therefor. In commemoration of the service of the late Mayor Joni Villanueva who was also one of the facility’s visionaries, the facility was officially named after her. This RA is the culmination of House Bill No. 6859 introduced by Rep. Alan Peter Cayetano; House Bill No. 8606 introduced by Representatives Cayetano, Noel Rivera, and Eddie Villanueva; Senate Bill No. 1060 introduced by Senator Sonny Angara; and the DOH Position Paper citing Department Memorandum (D.M.) No. 2020-0448: DOH ExeCom Directives on the Establishment of Potential and Existing Extension Health Facilities of the DOH as Separate Health Facilities. With the initiative of the Congress and the evaluation of the DOH, Joni Villanueva General Hospital was established as a separate entity from the JBLMGH and is envisioned as the level 2 general hospital managed by DOH in the province of Bulacan.

Thereafter, Administrative Order (AO) No. 2022-0027: Implementing Rules and Regulations (IRR) of RA 11720 was approved and signed on 2022 August 02. Through this AO, the Director of the Central Luzon Center for Health Development (CLCHD) – Director Corazon Flores – was tasked to act as the Officer-in-Charge of the JVGH in her concurrent capacity. A separate committee, the Joni Villanueva General Hospital (JVGH) Transition Committee, was also established through Regional Personnel Order (RPO) No. 2022-2404, to ensure the efficient and effective planning and establishment of JVGH.

With the guidance of the whole DOH community, the CLCHD eventually decided that JVGH is ready to apply to become a full-pledged infirmary. A Department Personnel Order (DPO) dated 2022 November 25 designated Dr. Lailani P. Mangulabnan as the OIC-Medical Center Chief I in her concurrent capacity as the OIC-Director III of the CLCHD. This was done to facilitate the licensing requirements of the JVGH. Subsequently, another DPO was issued designating Dr. Joy Aiza Ramos- Sombillo, department head of the JBLMGH Emergency Medicine and Emergency Room Service, as the OIC-Medical Center Chief I. With her hospital expertise, Dr. Sombillo will be able to guide JVGH through its initial operations.

On December 12, 2022, a ribbon-cutting ceremony marked the opening of JVGH as an infirmary. By September 2024, it had been accredited as a Level 2 general hospital under the leadership of Dr. Renely P. Tungol, Medical Center Chief I.

== Facility and services ==
The hospital is located in barangay Igulot, Bocaue, Bulacan and accessible from the North Luzon Expressway via the Ciudad de Victoria exit. Initially with 29 beds, the hospital's capacity was extended to 69 beds in June 2024. A Malasakit Center branch, the fourth to be established in Bulacan province, was opened on March 11, 2024. In May 2026, the hospital implemented Appoint-Q, a digital appointment and queue management system designed to improve outpatient scheduling, patient flow, and queue monitoring services. The platform supports online appointment booking, appointment confirmation, and kiosk-based queue assistance for hospital visitors. In July 2026, the hospital launched CALL-JONI, a digital referral and command center platform developed to support patient referral coordination, emergency communication, and inter-facility collaboration. The system enables participating healthcare facilities to submit electronic referrals, monitor referral status, exchange patient information securely, and facilitate coordination between referring facilities and the hospital's Command Center. CALL-JONI complements the hospital's digital health initiatives by integrating referral management with outpatient follow-up through the Appoint-Q platform.
