= Taguig City General Hospital =

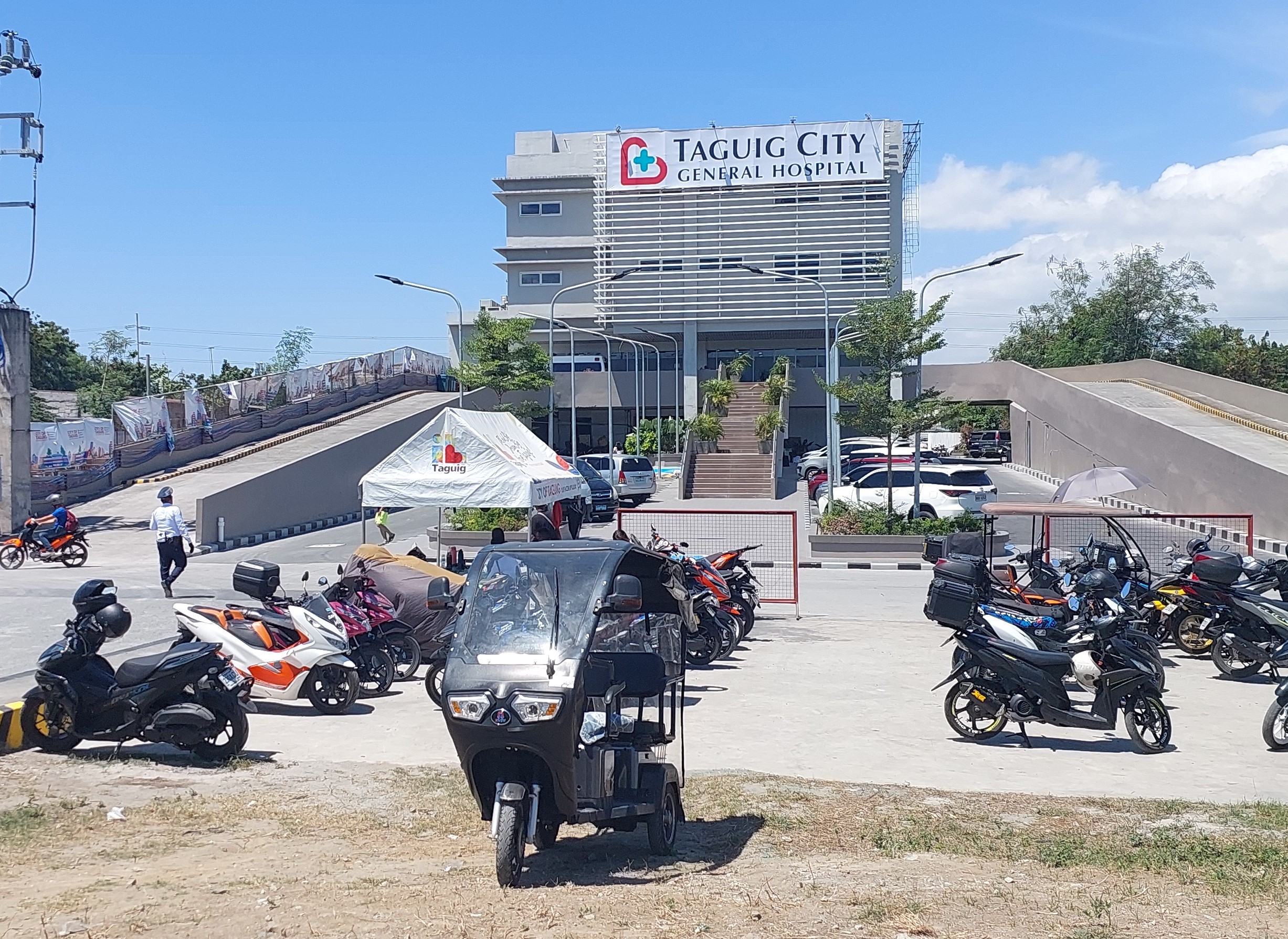

Geography
- Location: 506, C6 Road, Hagonoy, Taguig, Metro Manila, Philippines
- Coordinates: 14°30′50″N 121°04′22″E

Organization
- Type: General

History
- Opened: January 30, 2025

Links
- Lists: Hospitals in the Philippines

The Taguig City General Hospital (TCGH) is a public general hospital located along C6 Road in Barangay Hagonoy, Taguig, Philippines. It is one of the two city-owned hospitals, the other being the Taguig–Pateros District Hospital, and its primary concern is the admission and treatment of patients who are bona fide residents of the city.

== History ==
The TCGH Outpatient Department (OPD) was opened to the public on January 30, 2025, and was the second city-owned hospital to open after the Taguig–Pateros District Hospital (TPDH). TCGH aims to be a Level 2 hospital, and the opening of its OPD was viewed as its first step to be upgraded.

== Design ==
The hospital was designed by Archion Architects. The four-storey hospital has a total floor area of 19,013.78 square meters (204,662.6 sq ft).

== See also ==
- Taguig–Pateros District Hospital
