= Maria L. Eleazar General Hospital =

Government hospital in Quezon, Philippines

Geography
- Location: Tagkawayan, Quezon, Southern Tagalog, Philippines
- Coordinates: 13°57′59″N 122°32′35″E

Organization
- Funding: Government hospital
- Type: tertiary level hospital

The Maria L. Eleazar General Hospital (MLEGH) is a tertiary level government hospital in the Philippines. It is located in Tagkawayan, Quezon.
