= Philippine Children's Medical Center =

Government hospital in Quezon City, Philippines

- Department of Health

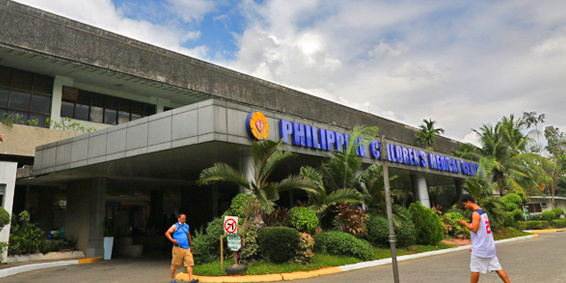

Geography
- Location: Quezon Avenue, Quezon City, Metro Manila, Philippines
- Coordinates: 14°38′51″N 121°02′29″E

Organization
- Type: Children's hospital

Services
- Beds: 200–300

History
- Founded: June 23, 1980

Links
- Website: pcmc.gov.ph
- Lists: Hospitals in the Philippines

The Philippine Children's Medical Center (Filipino: Sentrong Pagamutan ng mga Bata sa Pilipinas) is a government-run children's hospital in Quezon City, Metro Manila, Philippines. The hospital as a government-owned and controlled corporation is attached to the Department of Health.

== History ==
The Philippine Children's Medical Center was established as the Lungsod ng Kabataan (LNK; 'Children's City') on August 10, 1979, through Presidential Decree No. 1631 issued by President Ferdinand Marcos. The decree was issued during the International Year of the Child. The Lungsod ng Kabataan was inaugurated on April 29, 1980, in a ceremony attended by Princess Margaret of the United Kingdom. On June 23, 1980, under the Ministry of Human Settlements, led by First Lady Imelda Marcos, the hospital became operational.

The hospital adopted its current name on January 12, 1987, during the administration of President Corazon Aquino through Memorandum Order No. 2.

PCMC began with 47 active medical staff composed of recognized pediatricians and pediatric surgeons who pioneered the four clinical services initially offered, to wit: Ambulatory, In-Patient Care, Surgery, and Critical Care. At about the same time, the Department of Laboratories and the Physical Rehabilitation Unit were also established and became fully operational.

From 1983 to 1985, PCMC expanded its activities in patient care services, Residency and Fellowship training, and continuing medical education. Improvement in physical infrastructure and the creation of more service components became the focus in the late 1980s. Pediatric subspecialties such as Neonatology, Pulmonology, Nephrology, Cardiology, Hematology, and Allergology under the Department of Pediatric Medicine, as well as Anesthesia under the Department of Pediatric Surgery were subsequently established.

In line with the PCMC vision to be the premier Pediatric Center of the country, the Child Neuroscience Department, the Center for Developmental Intervention, Perinatology Department and Research Department were likewise created. With the goal of strengthening the tertiary care facilities of the institution, Pediatric Dentistry and Child Psychiatry were formed in 1989. Throughout the 1990s, PCMC continued to improve its operations. Various innovative activities under the Committee of Primary Preventive and Promotive Programs were organized. Institutional highlights during the turn of the century introduced new Fellowship Training Programs such as Pediatric Radiology and Pediatric Gynecology.

Under the leadership of Dr. Julius Almario Lecciones, who has been executive director since 2006, the PCMC has maintained Level IV training hospital accreditation, with an authorized 212-bed capacity, serving patients from newborn to 19 years old, as well as high-risk pregnant women.

== Facilities and services ==
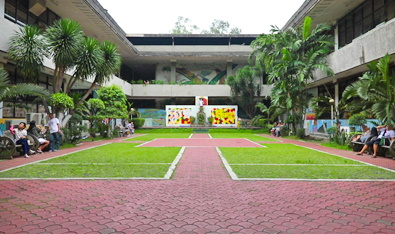
Santo Niño Atrium

The Philippine Children's Medical Center has a 200–300 bed capacity. It is a specialty center catering to people 19 years of age and below as well as high-risk pregnant women. The institution specializes in pediatric care and research.

The PCMC host the largest ICU for children in the Philippines. It has the biggest neonatal intensive care unit (NICU) that is integral to the Perinatal Care and Neonatology Center. Its Child Neurology and Neurosurgery Service Program is inclusive of a neurodevelopment center. It has a pediatric rehabilitation facility and a pediatric multi-specialty for inpatients, as well as for clinic service to out-patients and referrals. Among these are the Cancer and Hematology Center; Adolescent Center (Teen Republic); Pediatric Lung, Heart, Kidney and Liver Center; Pediatric Critical Care Center, and; the Clinical Centers for General Pediatric Services and Surgical & Allied Medical Services, respectively.

In July 2013, the newly constructed OPD building was finally opened to accommodate the increasing number of service patients being referred to PCMC for specialty care.

PCMC also partnered with Rotary Club Makati West – Gift of Life, an international non-government organization, which give way for two open-heart surgery missions for service patients with congenital heart diseases.

Later this year, it began its hospital-wide retrofitting, a strong infrastructure improvement.

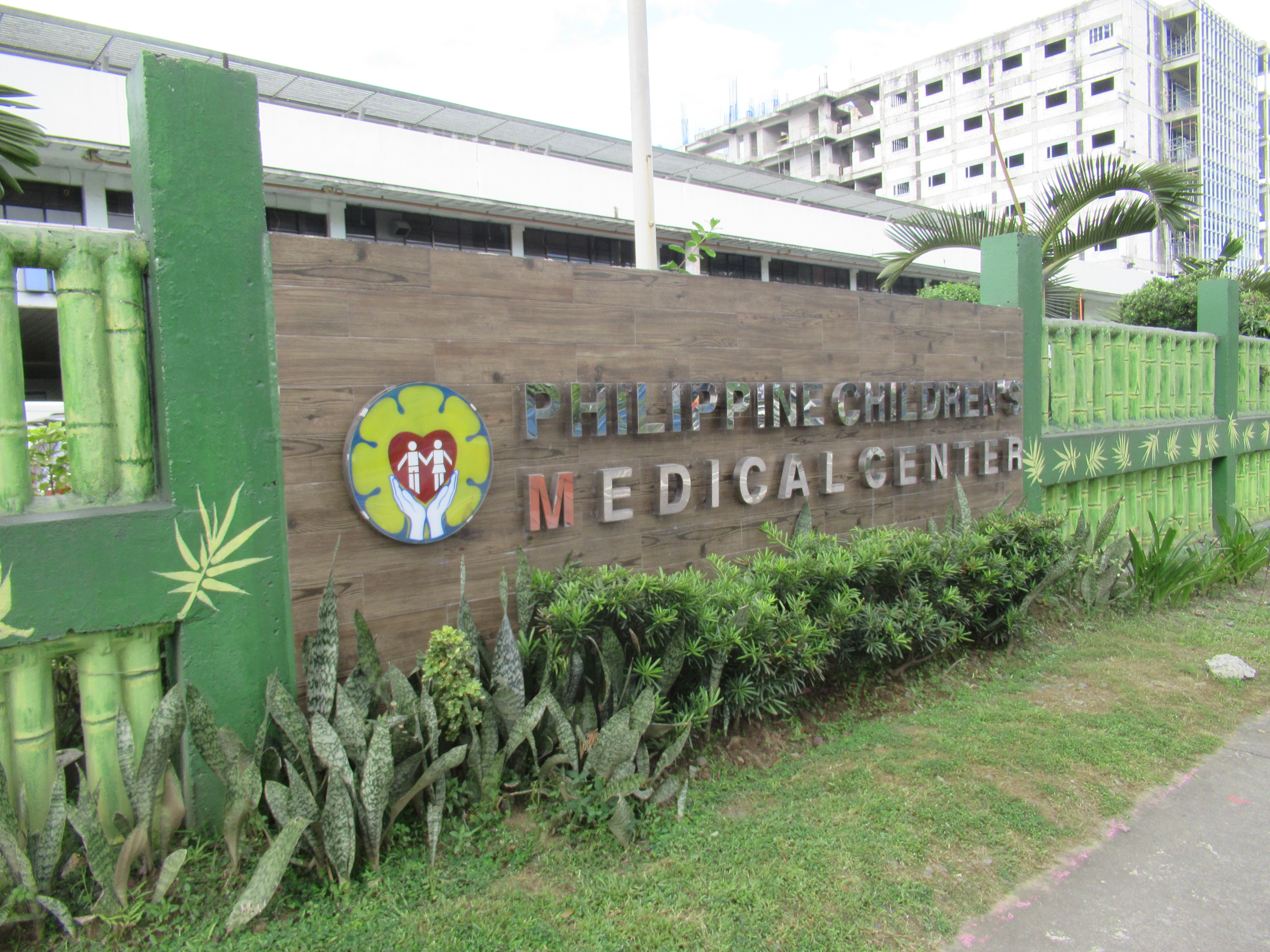
Gate

== Administration ==
The Philippine Children's Medical Center is managed as a government-owned and operated corporation (GOCC) which is attached to the Department of Health. The hospital's government firm shares Board of Trustees with the other three specialty hospitals (Philippine Heart Center, Lung Center of the Philippines, and the National Kidney and Transplant Institute). This setup is pursuant to Executive Order No. 119 issued in 1987.

== See also ==
- National Children's Hospital (Philippines)
