= Makati Life Medical Center =

Private hospital in Makati, Philippines

- LifeNurture Inc.

Geography
- Location: Bel-Air, Makati, Metro Manila, Philippines
- Coordinates: 14°33′47″N 121°01′04″E

Services
- Emergency department: Yes
- Beds: 360 (planned)

History
- Former name: Ospital ng Makati 2
- Opened: May 8, 2023; 3 years ago

Links
- Website: makatilife.com

The Makati Life Medical Center is a private tertiary hospital located in Makati, Metro Manila, Philippines.

== History ==
The Makati Life Medical Center, formerly known as the Ospital ng Makati 2 (OsMak2), was built to mainly serve residents of Makati in the first district. It is meant to complement the Ospital ng Makati in the second district.

The construction of the Makati Life Medical Center was funded under a public-private partnership between the Makati city government and private firm LifeNurture Inc. The joint venture was finalized in April 2021.

The hospital project costed around ₱9.77-billion. ₱5 billion of the funding came from syndicated loans from the Development Bank of the Philippines, Land Bank and Union Bank.

On May 8, 2023, the health facility was formally opened with the start of operations of the outpatient department. The hospital is projected to be fully operational by early 2024.

== Facilities ==
The Makati Life Medical Center is a consortium between the Makati city government and LifeNurture. Makati Life itself is a fully private tertiary hospital. The hospital is designed to accommodate 360 beds and 190 doctor's clinics.
