= Las Piñas General Hospital and Satellite Trauma Center =

Government hospital in Las Piñas, Philippines

Las Piñas General Hospital and Satellite Trauma Center (LPGHSTC)
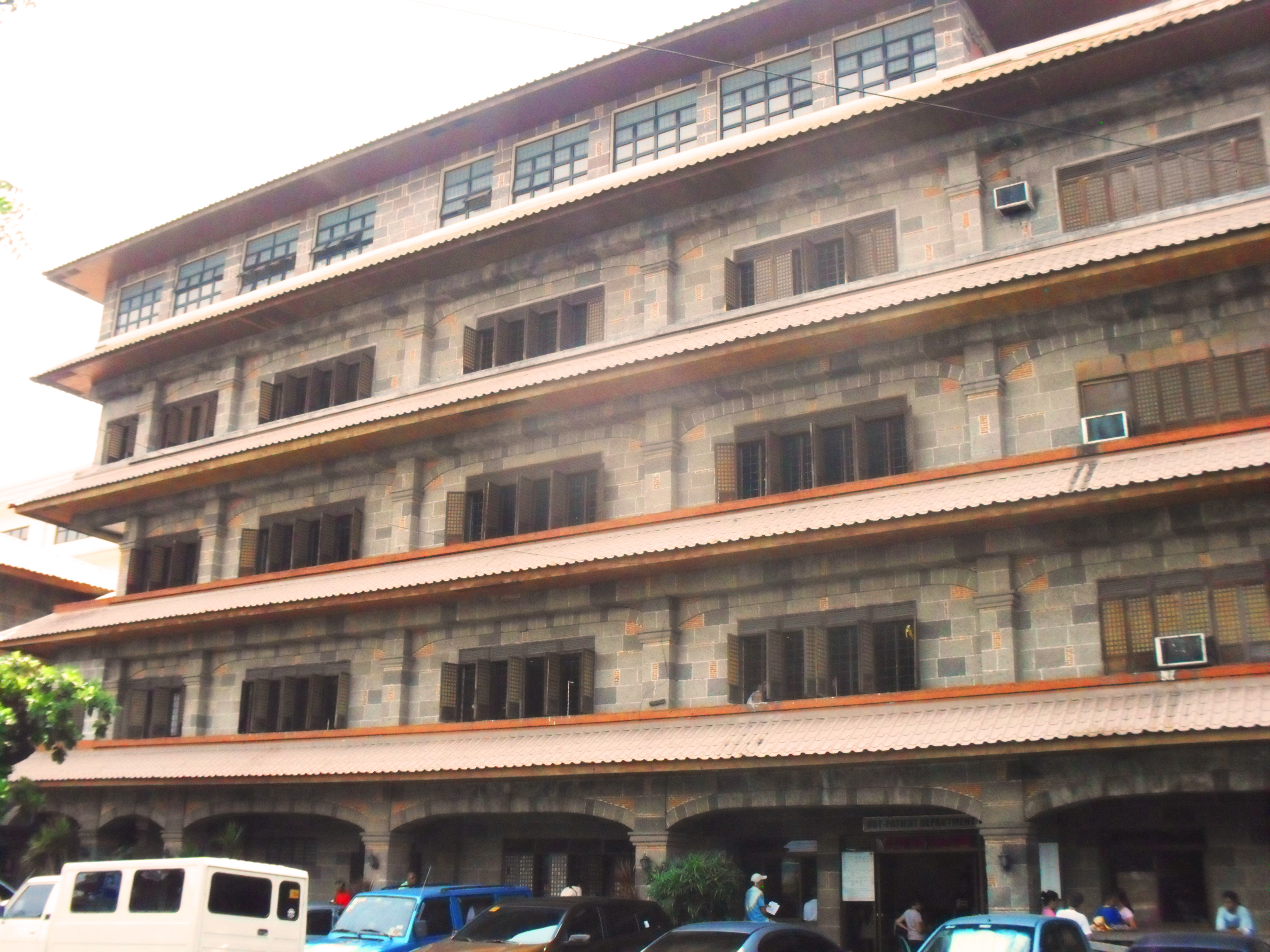

Geography
- Location: Las Piñas, Metro Manila, National Capital Region, Philippines
- Coordinates: 14°28′18″N 120°58′25″E

Organization
- Type: Level 3 hospital

Services
- Beds: 500

History
- Former names: Las Piñas Emergency Hospital (1977–1984); Las Piñas District Hospital (1984–2004)

Links
- Website: lpghstc.doh.gov.ph

The Las Piñas General Hospital and Satellite Trauma Center (LPGHSTC; formerly known as the Las Piñas Emergency Hospital and the Las Piñas District Hospital) is a tertiary level government hospital in the Philippines with an authorized bed capacity of five hundred (500). It is located along Diego Cera Avenue, Bernabe Compound, Pulanglupa I, Las Piñas, Metro Manila.
