= Corazon Locsin Montelibano Memorial Regional Hospital =

Government hospital in Bacolod, Philippines

Corazon Locsin Montelibano Memorial Regional Hospital (CLMMRH)
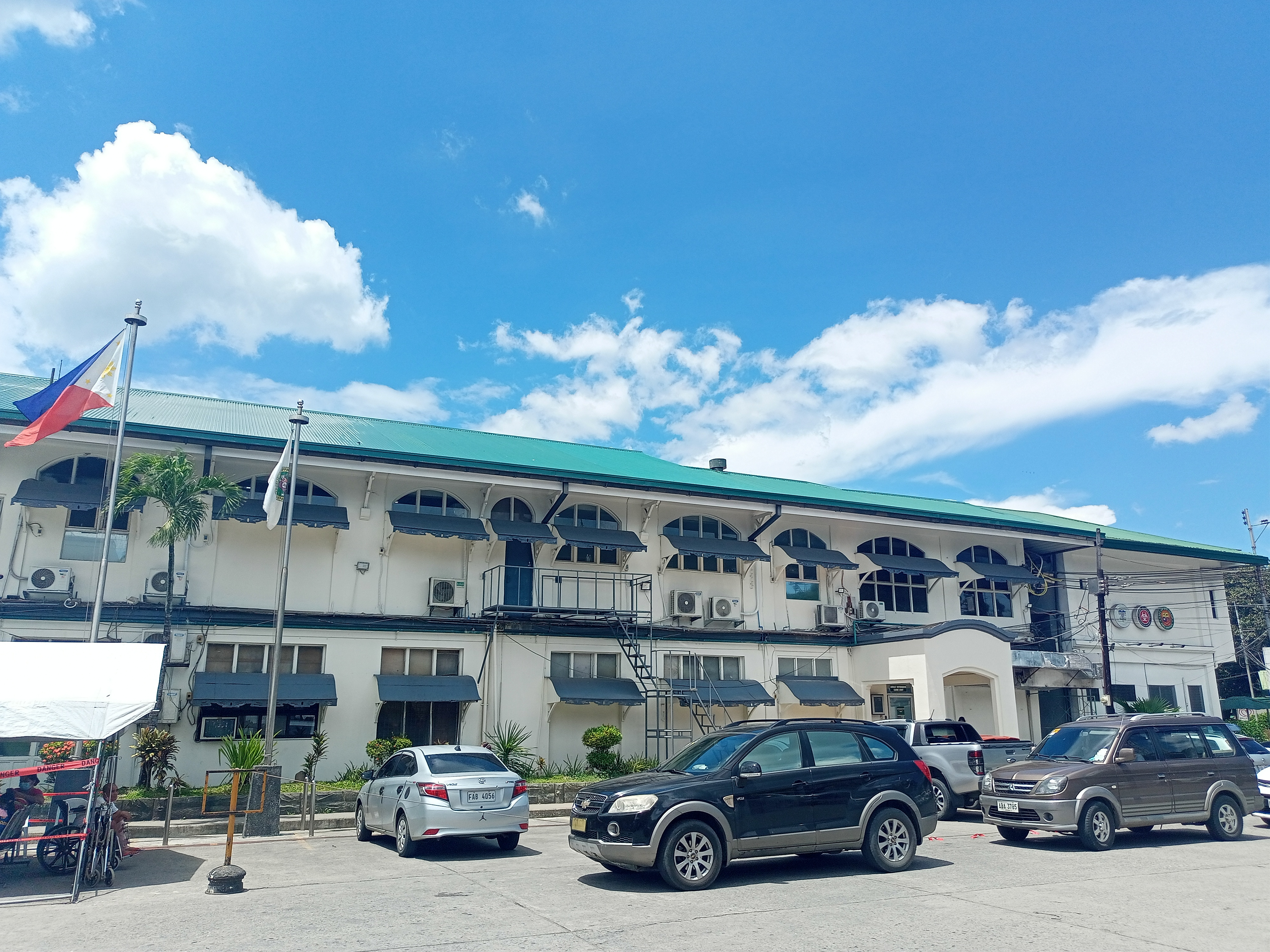

Geography
- Location: Bacolod, Negros Occidental, Negros Island Region, Philippines
- Coordinates: 10°40′19″N 122°57′03″E

Organization
- Type: tertiary level hospital

Services
- Beds: 1000

History
- Founded: March 24, 1926; 99 years ago

Links
- Website: clmmrh.doh.gov.ph

The Corazon Locsin Montelibano Memorial Regional Hospital (CLMMRH) is a tertiary level government hospital in the Philippines with an authorized bed capacity of one thousand (1000). It is located along Lacson Street, Bacolod, Negros Occidental.

== History ==
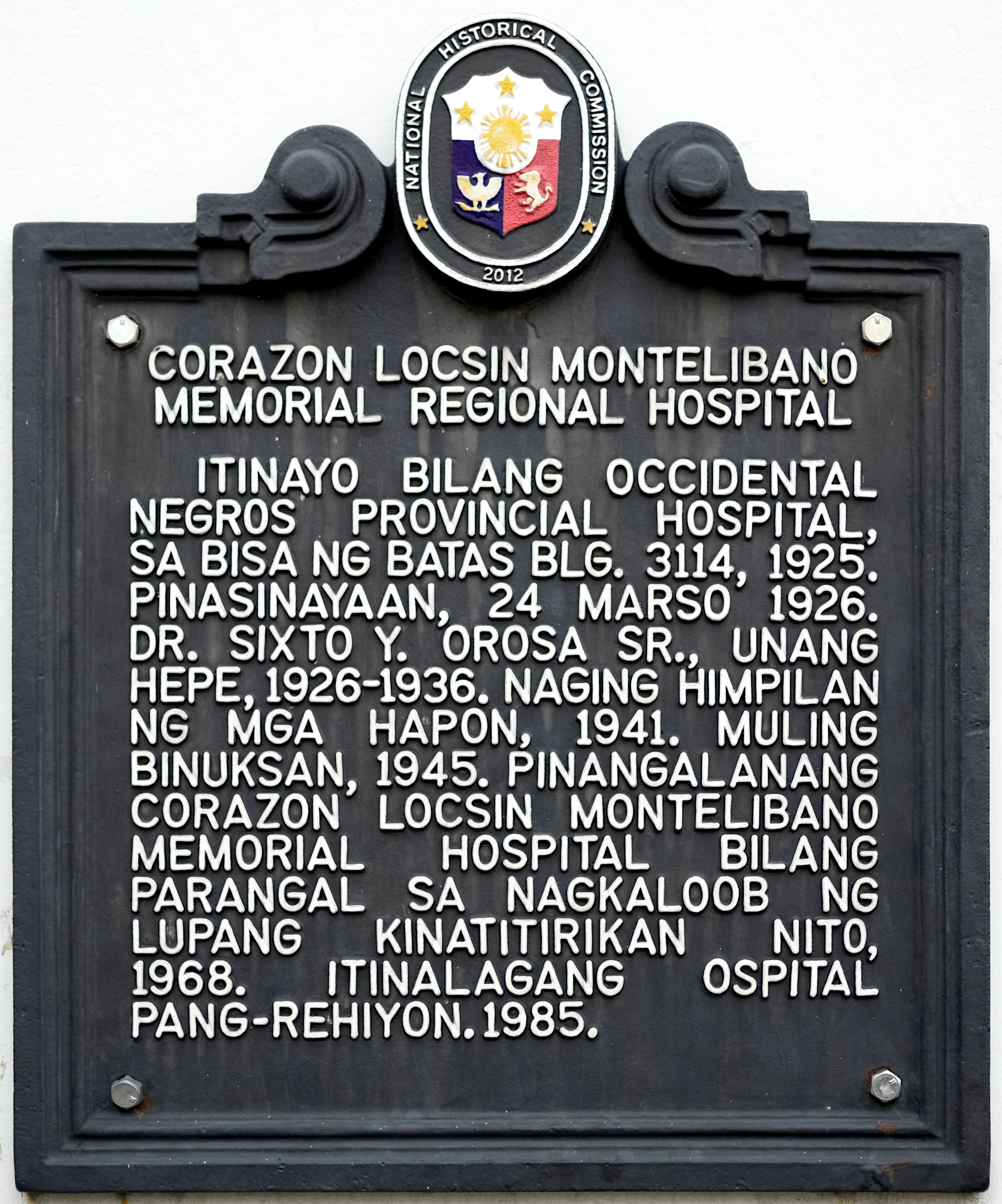
Historical marker installed in 2012

The Corazon Locsin Montelibano Memorial Regional Hospital (CLMMRH) formerly called the Occidental Negros Provincial Hospital (ONPH), was founded on March 24, 1926, with a 25-bed capacity. It is located at Lacson-Burgos Street, Bacolod City, Negros Occidental, Philippines. Its first Chief of Hospital was Dr. Sixto Y. Orosa Sr who authored the landmark Philippine Provincial Act. In 1937, the bed capacity was increased to 100.

When the war broke out in 1941, the hospital was closed to the public and the building was occupied by the Japanese Imperial Forces. In June 1942, thee hospital reopened but was transferred to the old Maternity Hospital. After the war, in February 1945, the hospital returned to its present site with its bed capacity increased to 150.

In 1962, ONPH was designated as one of the training government hospitals for nurses in Western Visayas. On June 7, 1968, the name ONPH was changed to Corazon Locsin Montelibano Memorial Hospital in honor of the donor of the lot on which it stands. In 1977, the bed capacity was increased to 300. By virtue of Batasang Pambansa Bilang 118 dated January 21, 1991, its bed capacity was increased to 400; However, there was no corresponding increase in plantilla positions until 2013.

On July 3, 1984, it was reclassified into a regional hospital by virtue of Ministry of Health Administrative Order No. 95 and was renamed Western Visayas Regional Hospital. The name of the hospital was further changed to Corazon Locsin Montelibano Memorial Regional Hospital as it appeared in the General Appropriation Act of 1985.

On May 30, 2012, the National Historical Commission of the Philippines installed the historical marker at the CLMMRH Heritage Building, declaring it a national site because of its strong American architecture and is more than fifty years old.

On May 6, 2014, CLMMRH was officially awarded with the ISO 9001:2008 certificate on Patient care management and another certificate on Residency training program on April 29, 2015, by Anglo Japanese American (AJA) Registrars.

On May 19, 2017, CLMMRH was ISO re-certified on Patient Care Management and on Residency Training program on ISO 9001:2015.

On August 28, 2019, Republic Act No. 11441, an act increasing the bed capacity of Corazon Locsin Montelibano Memorial Regional Hospital from 400 to 1,000 beds was approved and signed into law by President Rodrigo Roa Duterte, authorizing the increase of its personnel and appropriating funds therefore.

The CLMMRH is a tertiary teaching-learning hospital. Thirteen (13) departments are accredited by their respective societies, namely: General Surgery, Internal Medicine, Obstetrics and Gynecology, Ophthalmology, Family and Community Medicine, Pediatrics, Anesthesiology, Otolaryngology-Head and Neck Surgery, Orthopedics and Traumatology, Pathology, Diagnostic Imaging and Radiologic Sciences, Urology, and Emergency Medicine. It serves as the sole end referral government hospital for the city of Bacolod, the entire province of Negros Island, and the neighboring provinces within the Negros Island Region and Western Visayas.
