= Rizal Medical Center =

Government hospital in Pasig, Philippines

Rizal Medical Center (RMC)

Geography
- Location: Pasig, Metro Manila, NCR, Philippines
- Coordinates: 14°33′50″N 121°03′57″E

Organization
- Funding: Government hospital

Services
- Beds: 500

Links
- Website: rmc.doh.gov.ph

Rizal Medical Center, also known by its initials RMC, is a government hospital in the Philippines with an authorized bed capacity of five hundred beds. It is located at 425 Pasig Boulevard, Bagong Ilog, Pasig City.
