= List of diplomatic missions of Poland =

This is a list of diplomatic missions of Poland

Excluding from this listing are honorary consulates, cultural institutes, and trade missions. On the other hand, the Polish Office in Taipei is included, as it serves as a de facto embassy to Taiwan, with which Poland does not have formal diplomatic relations.

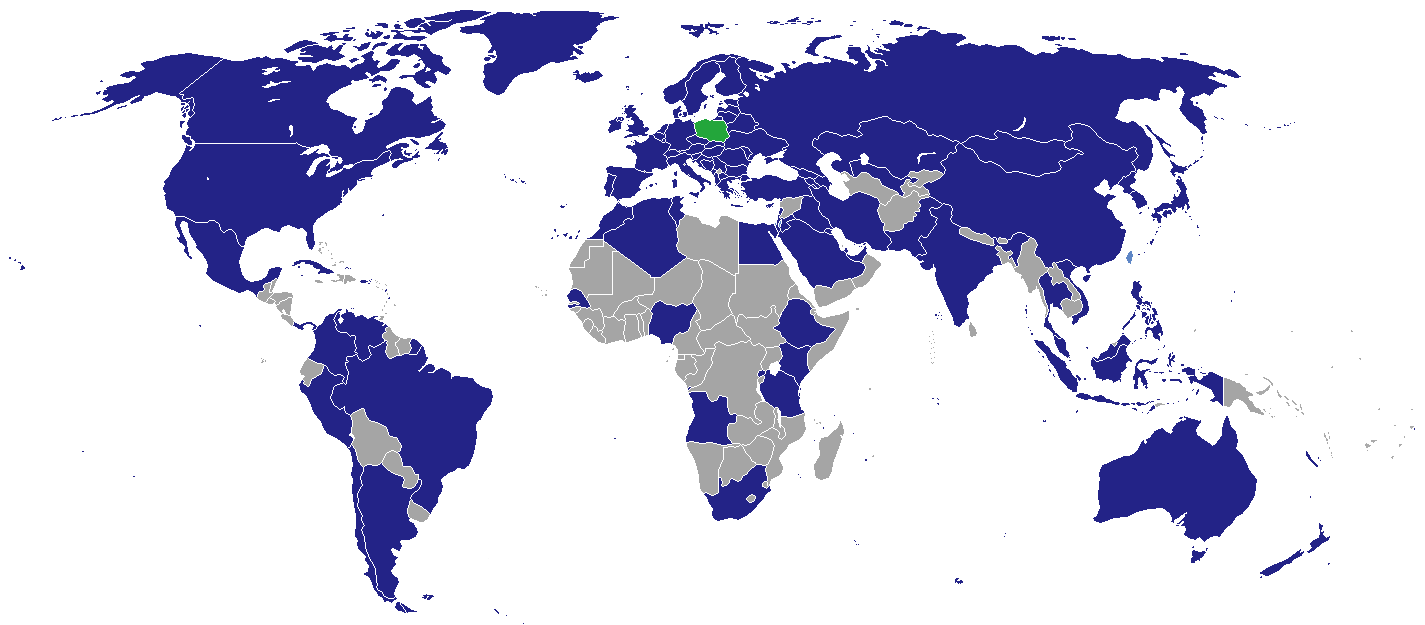
Republic of Poland Countries that host Polish embassies Countries that host only Polish missions that serve as de facto embassies

== Current missions ==
=== Africa ===
Host country	Host city	Mission	Concurrent accreditation	Ref.
Algeria	Algiers	Embassy	Countries: Chad; Niger	
Angola	Luanda	Embassy	Countries: Central African Republic; Congo-Brazzaville; Congo-Kinshasa; Gabon; São Tomé and Príncipe	
Egypt	Cairo	Embassy	Countries: Eritrea; Sudan	
Ethiopia	Addis Ababa	Embassy	Countries: Djibouti; South Sudan; International Organizations: African Union	
Kenya	Nairobi	Embassy	Countries: Madagascar; Mauritius; Seychelles; Somalia; Uganda	
Morocco	Rabat	Embassy	Countries: Mauritania	
Nigeria	Abuja	Embassy	Countries: Benin; Cameroon; Equatorial Guinea; Ghana; Liberia; Sierra Leone; Togo	
Rwanda	Kigali	Embassy		
Senegal	Dakar	Embassy	Countries: Burkina Faso; Cape Verde; Gambia; Guinea; Guinea-Bissau; Ivory Coast; Mali	
South Africa	Pretoria	Embassy	Countries: Botswana; Eswatini; Lesotho; Mozambique; Namibia; Zambia; Zimbabwe	
Tanzania	Dar es Salaam	Embassy	Countries: Burundi; Comoros; Malawi; Consular jurisdiction only: Rwanda (Note: The Polish Embassy in Kigali, Rwanda, was established in December of 2022. However it has yet to be fully operational. Until then, all consular matters are under the jurisdiction of the Polish Embassy in Dar Es Salaam)	
Tunisia	Tunis	Embassy	Countries: Libya	

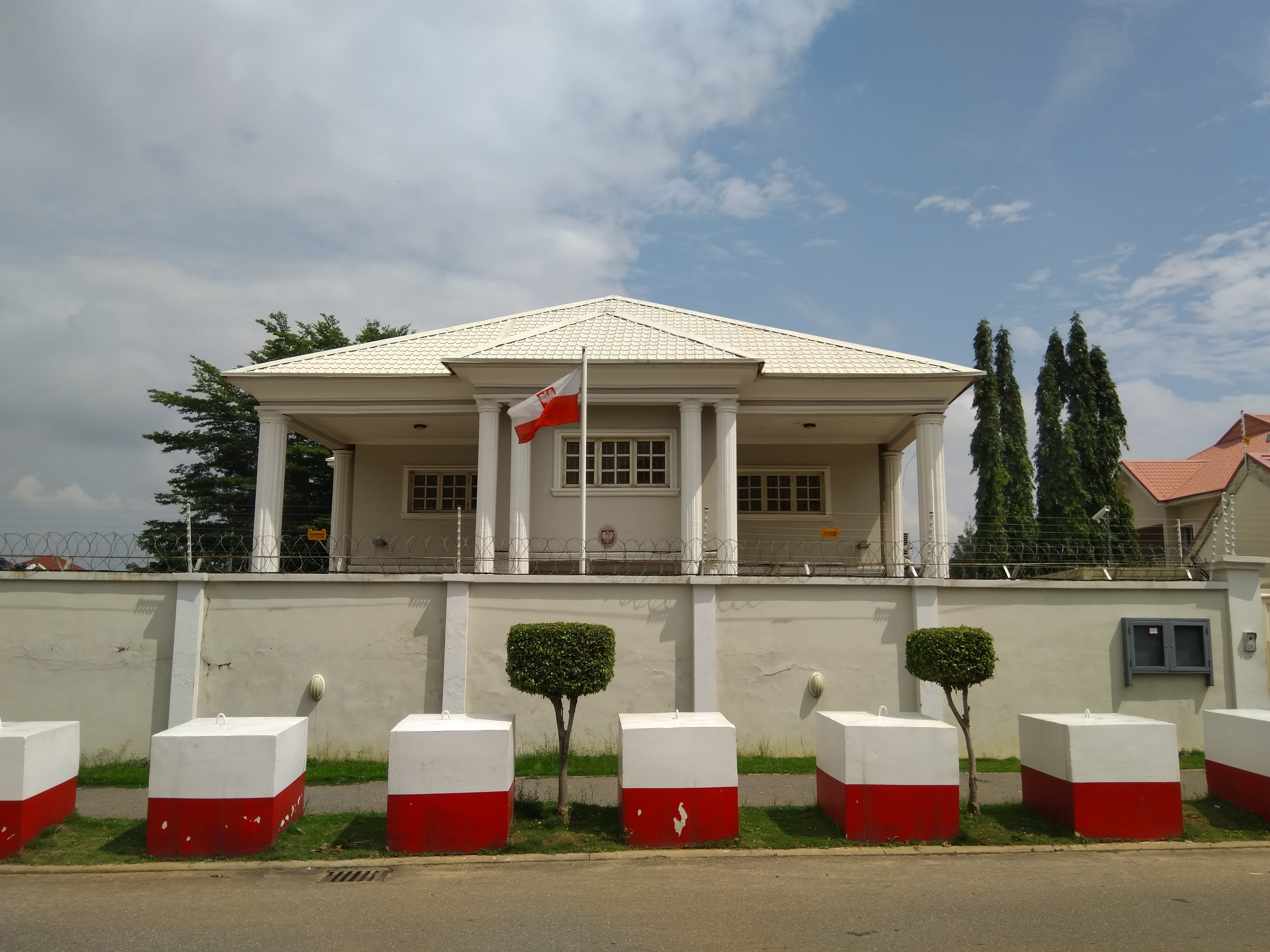
Embassy in Abuja

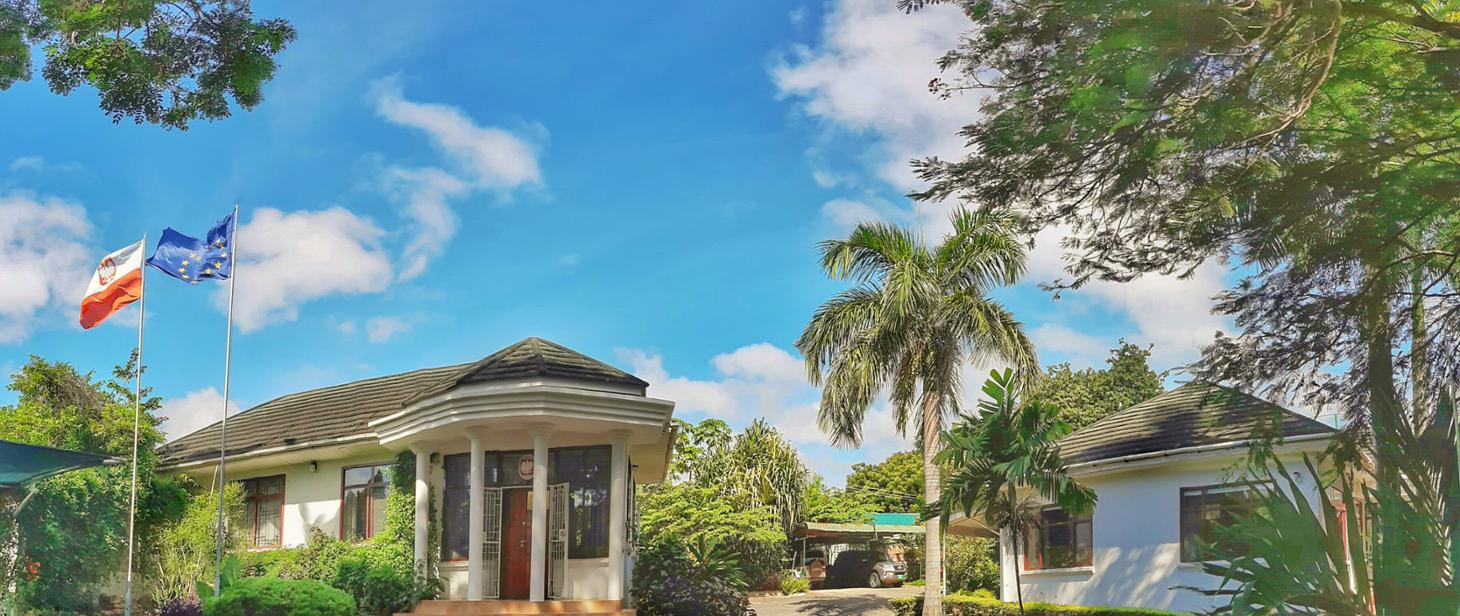
Embassy in Dar es Salaam

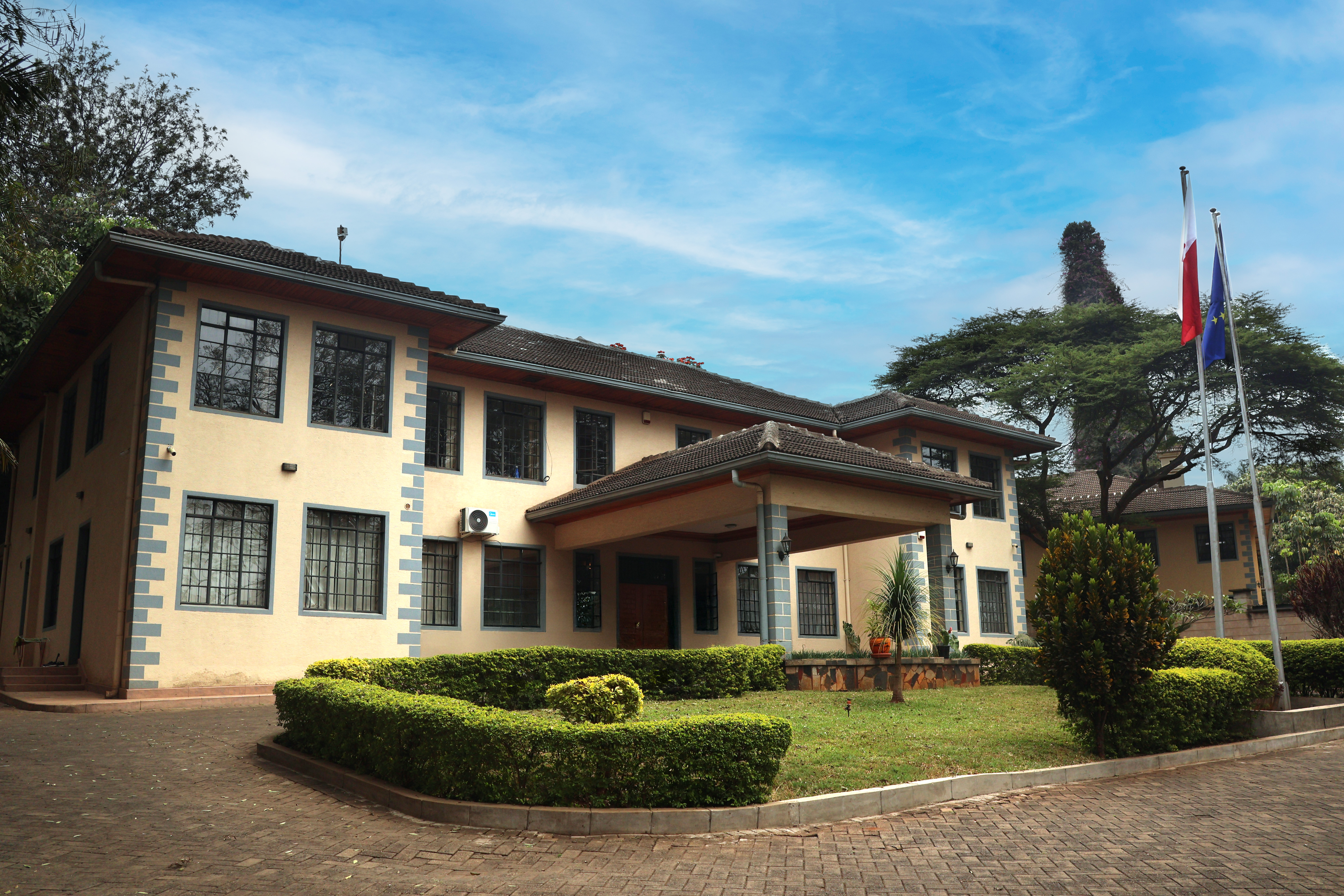
Embassy in Nairobi

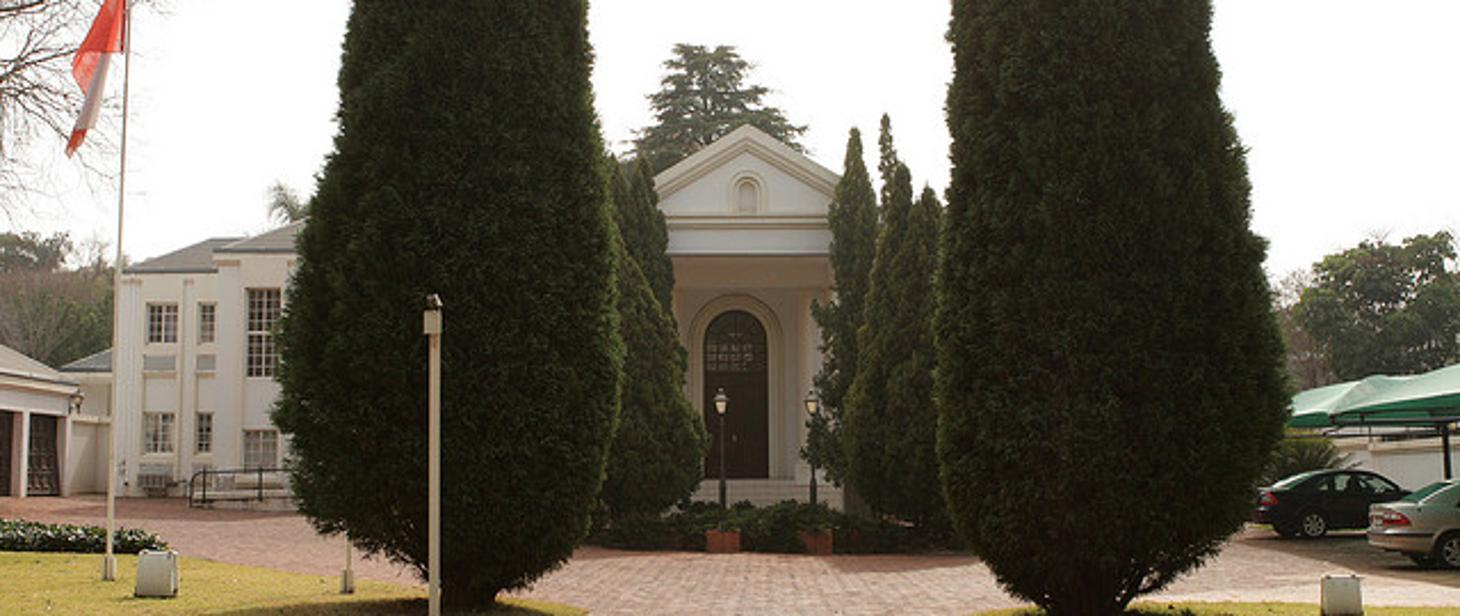
Embassy in Pretoria

=== Americas ===
Host country	Host city	Mission	Concurrent accreditation	Ref.
Argentina	Buenos Aires	Embassy	Countries: Paraguay; Uruguay	
Brazil	Brasília	Embassy		
Brazil	Curitiba	Consulate-General		
Canada	Ottawa	Embassy		
Canada	Montreal	Consulate-General		
Canada	Toronto	Consulate-General		
Canada	Vancouver	Consulate-General		
Chile	Santiago de Chile	Embassy		
Colombia	Bogotá	Embassy	Countries: Antigua and Barbuda; Saint Lucia	
Cuba	Havana	Embassy		
Mexico	Mexico City	Embassy	Countries: Costa Rica	
Panama	Panama City	Embassy	Countries: Belize; El Salvador; Dominican Republic; Guatemala; Haiti; Honduras; Nicaragua	
Peru	Lima	Embassy	Countries: Bolivia; Ecuador	
United States	Washington, D.C.	Embassy	Countries: Bahamas; International Organizations: Organization of American States (Note: Accredited as an observer mission.)	
United States	Chicago	Consulate-General	Countries: Bahamas; International Organizations: Organization of American States	
United States	Houston	Consulate-General	Countries: Bahamas; International Organizations: Organization of American States	
United States	Los Angeles	Consulate-General	Countries: Bahamas; International Organizations: Organization of American States	
United States	New York City	Consulate-General	Countries: Bahamas; International Organizations: Organization of American States	
Venezuela	Caracas	Embassy	Countries: Barbados; Dominica; Grenada; Guyana; Jamaica; Saint Kitts and Nevis; Saint Vincent and the Grenadines; Suriname; Trinidad and Tobago	

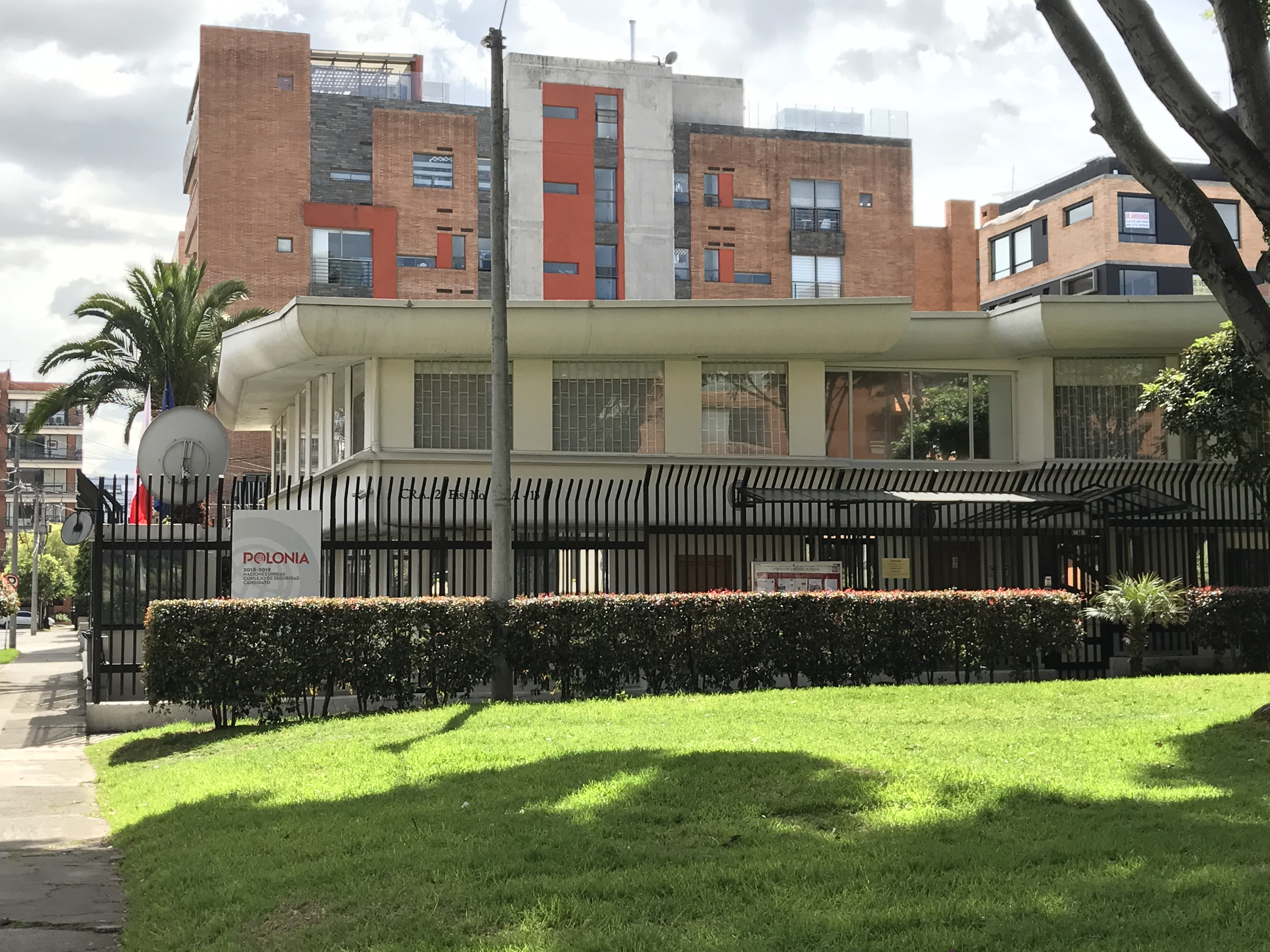
Embassy in Bogotá

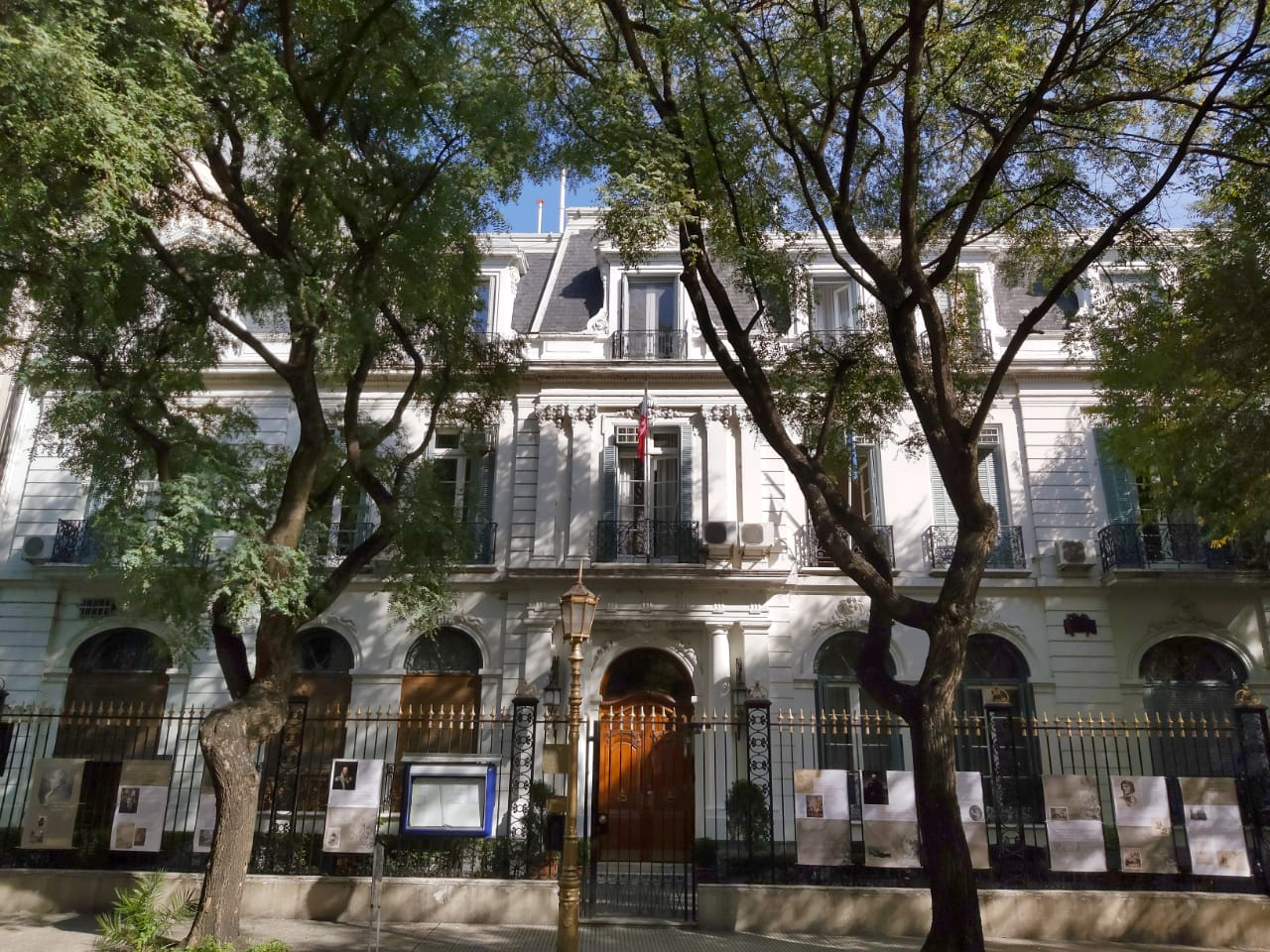
Embassy in Buenos Aires

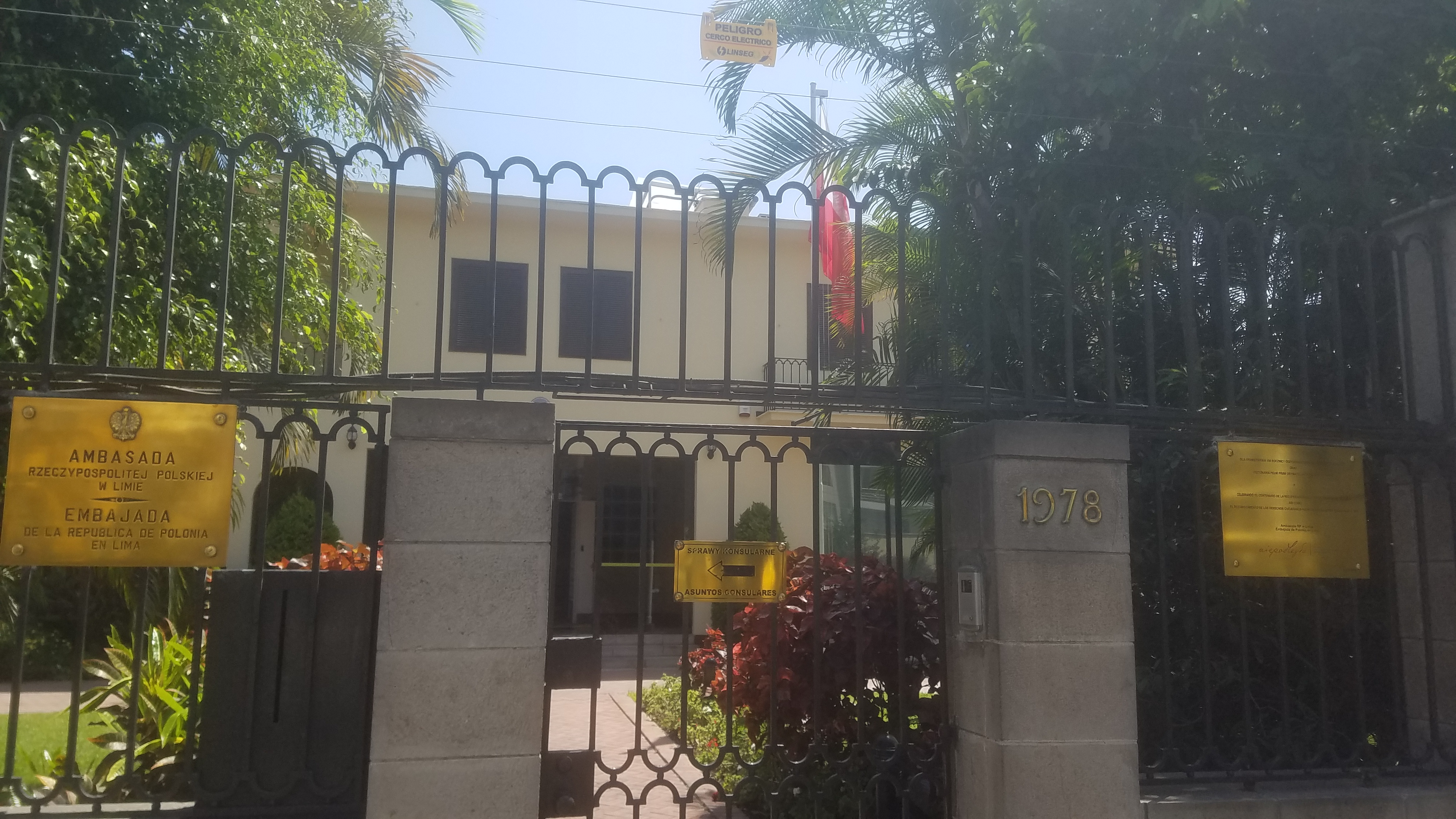
Embassy in Lima

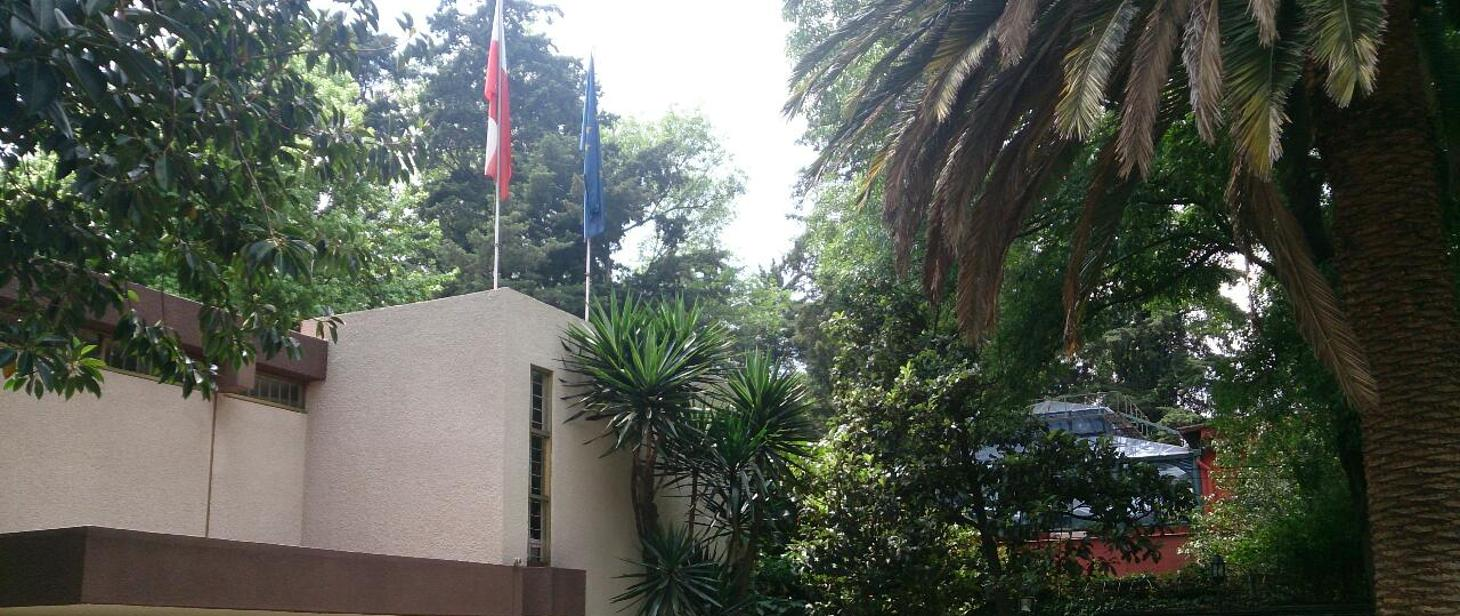
Embassy in Mexico City

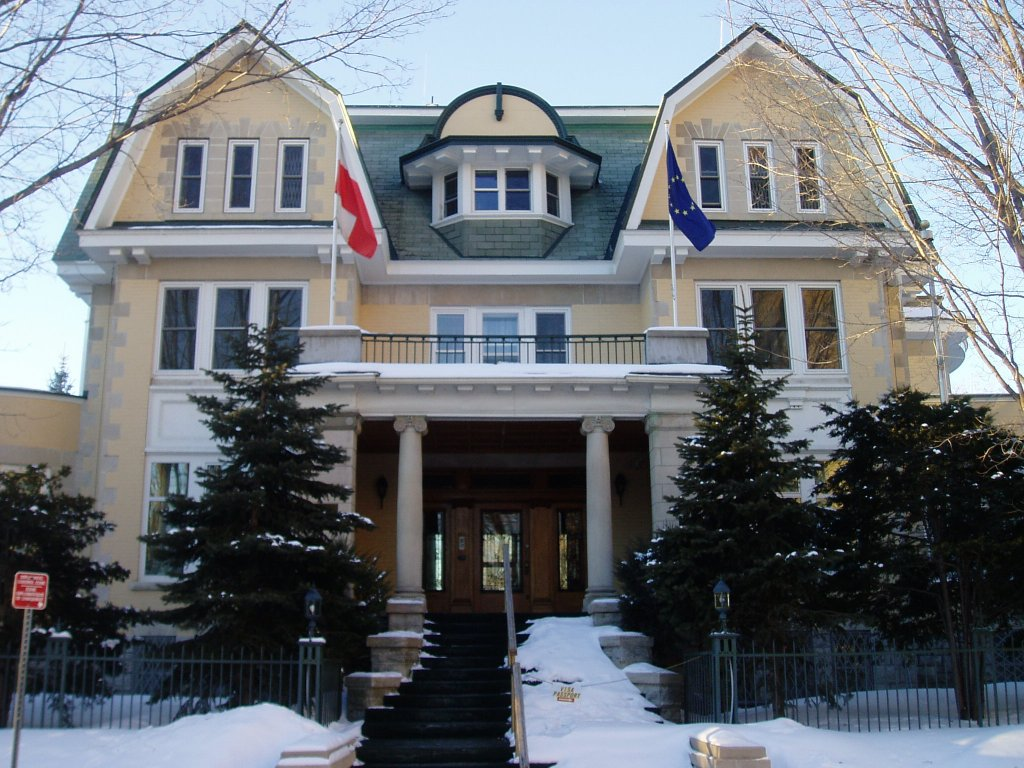
Embassy in Ottawa

Consulate-General in Montreal

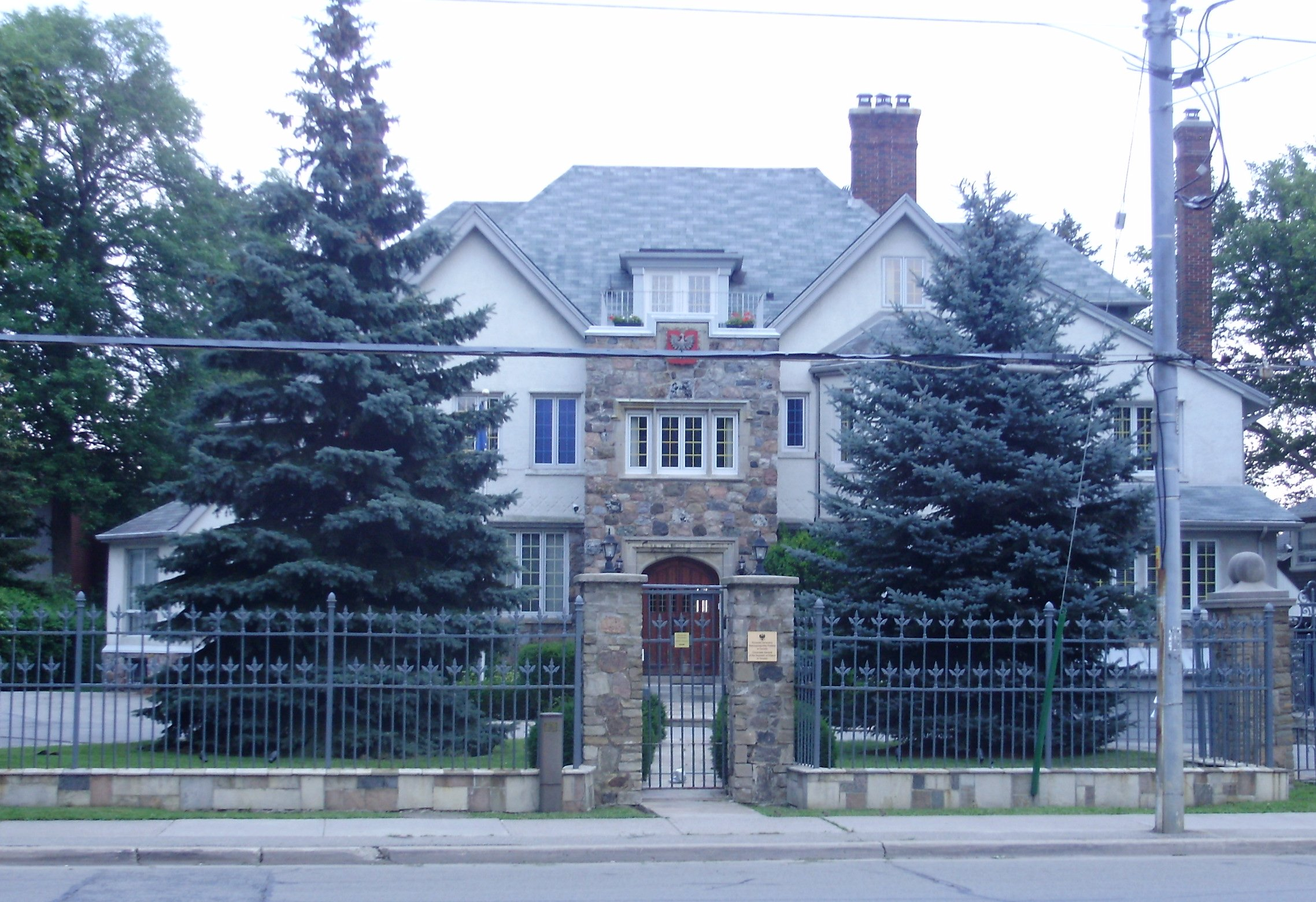
Consulate-General in Toronto

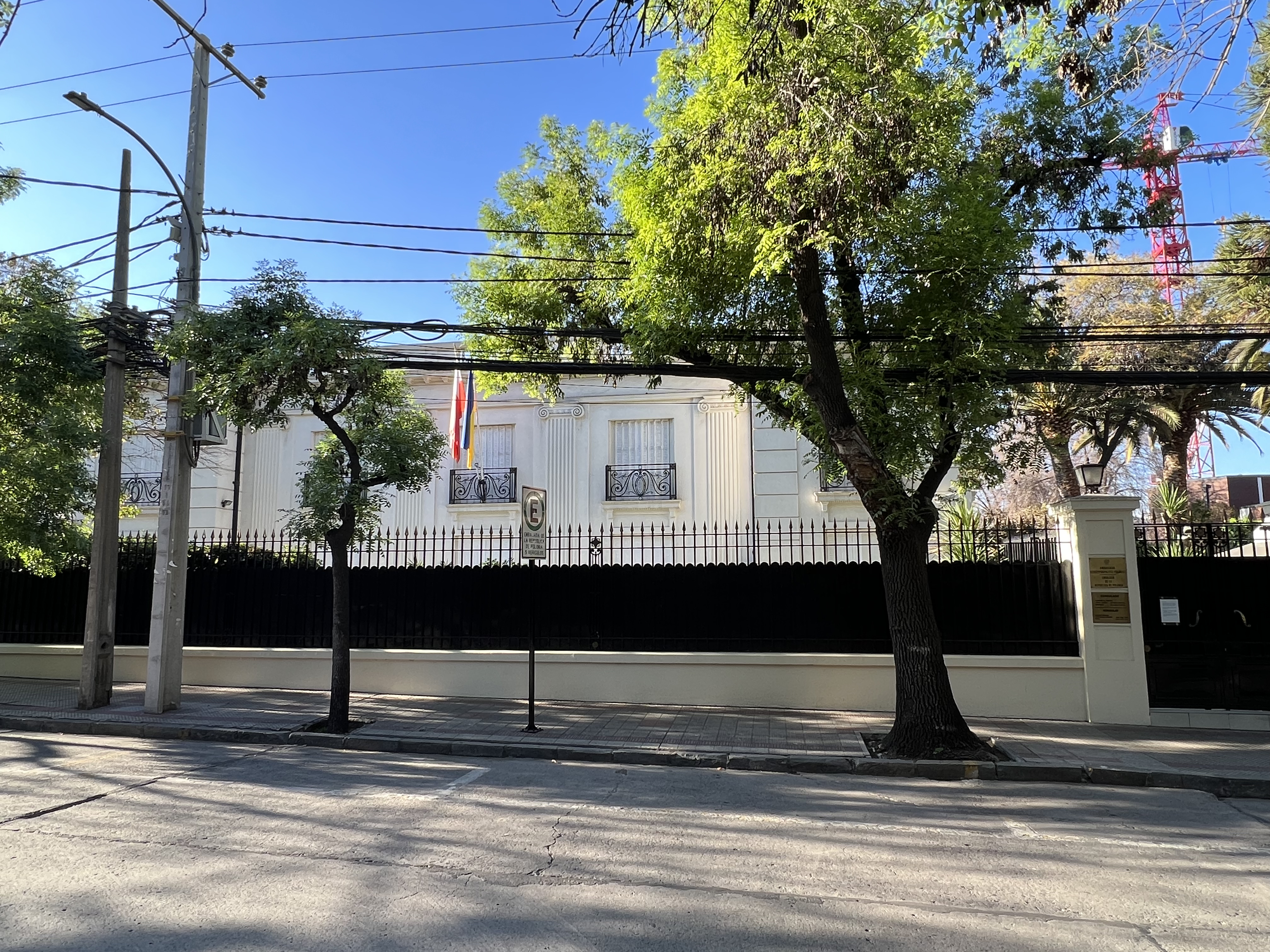
Embassy in Santiago

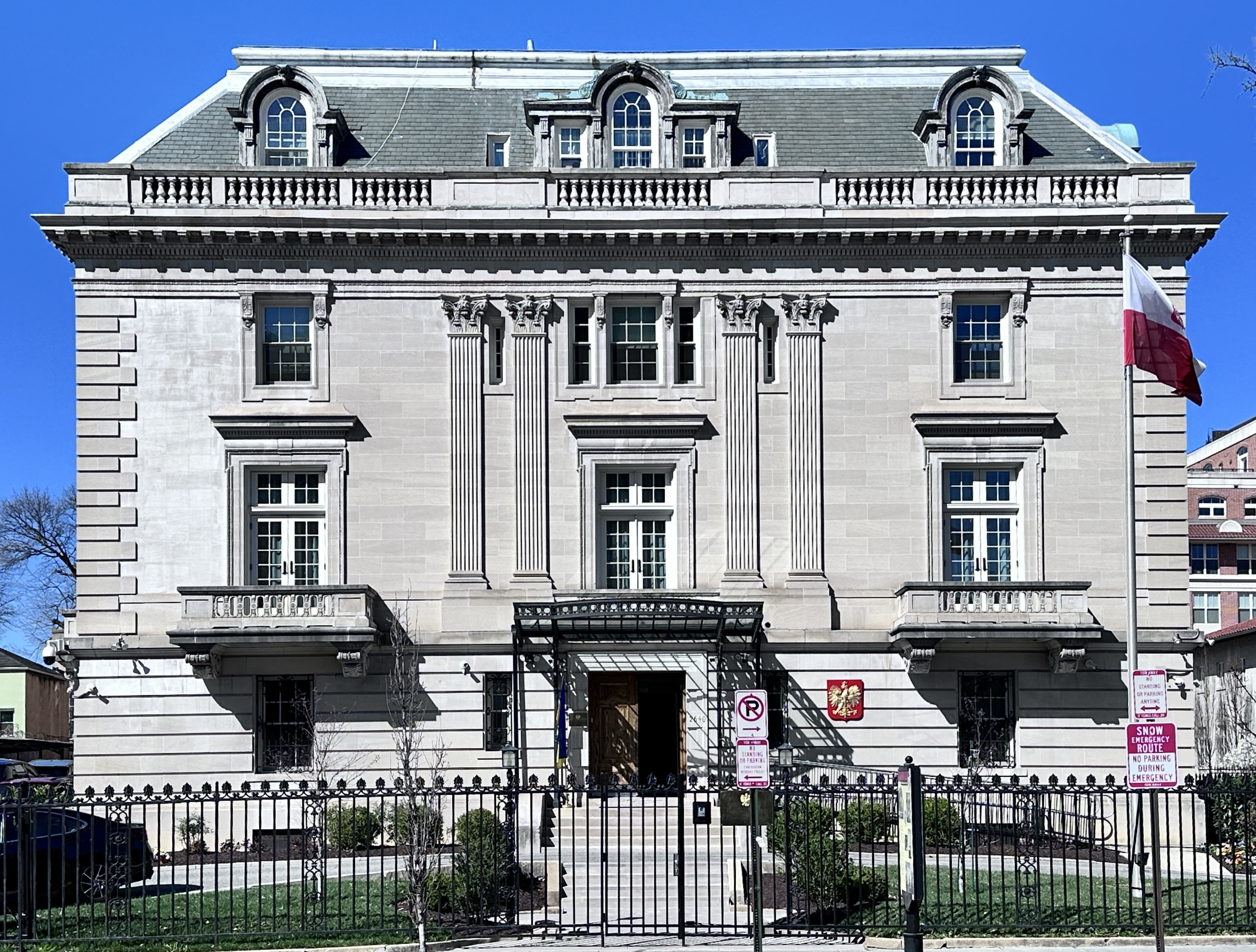
Embassy in Washington, D.C.

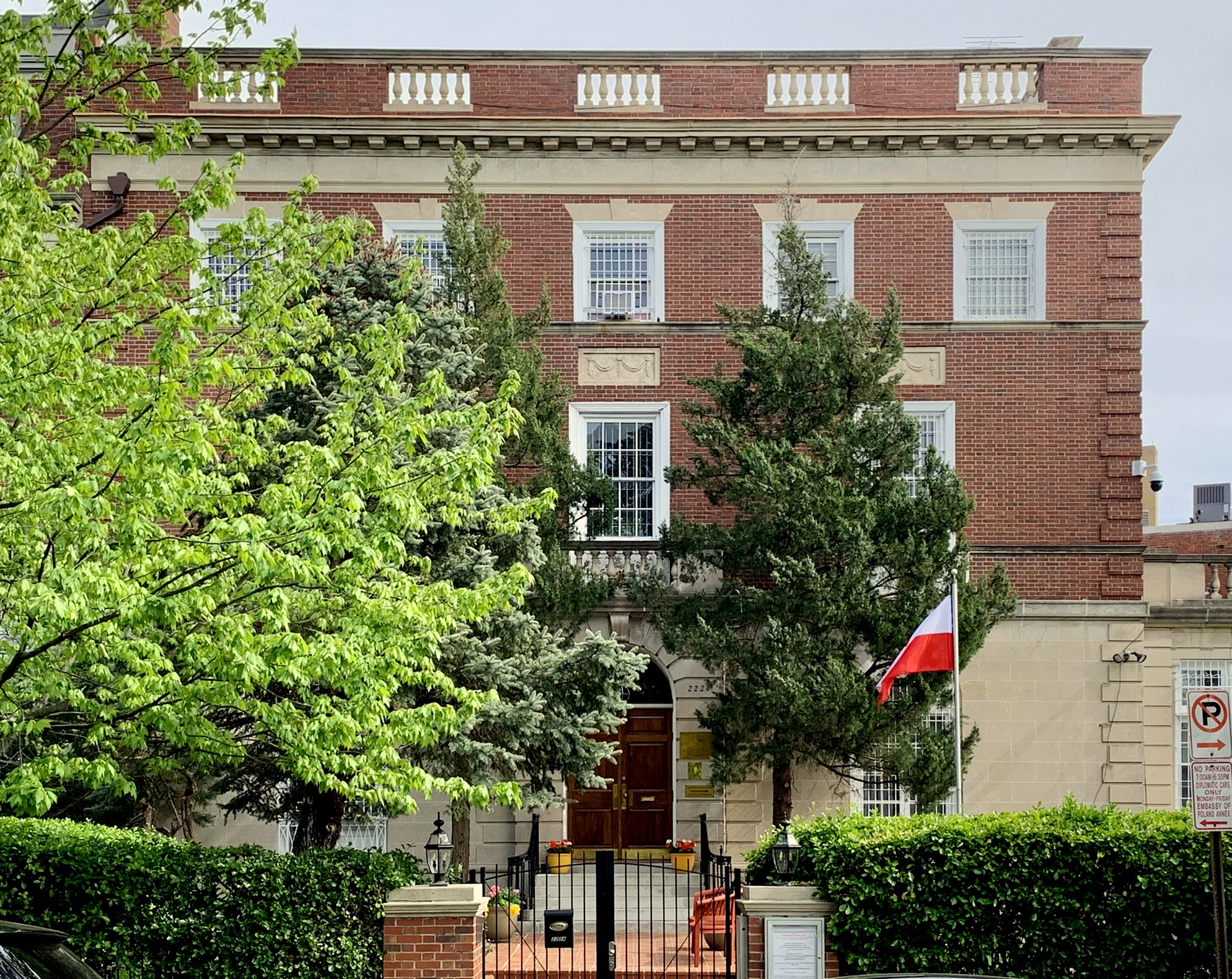
Consular Section of the Embassy in Washington, D.C.

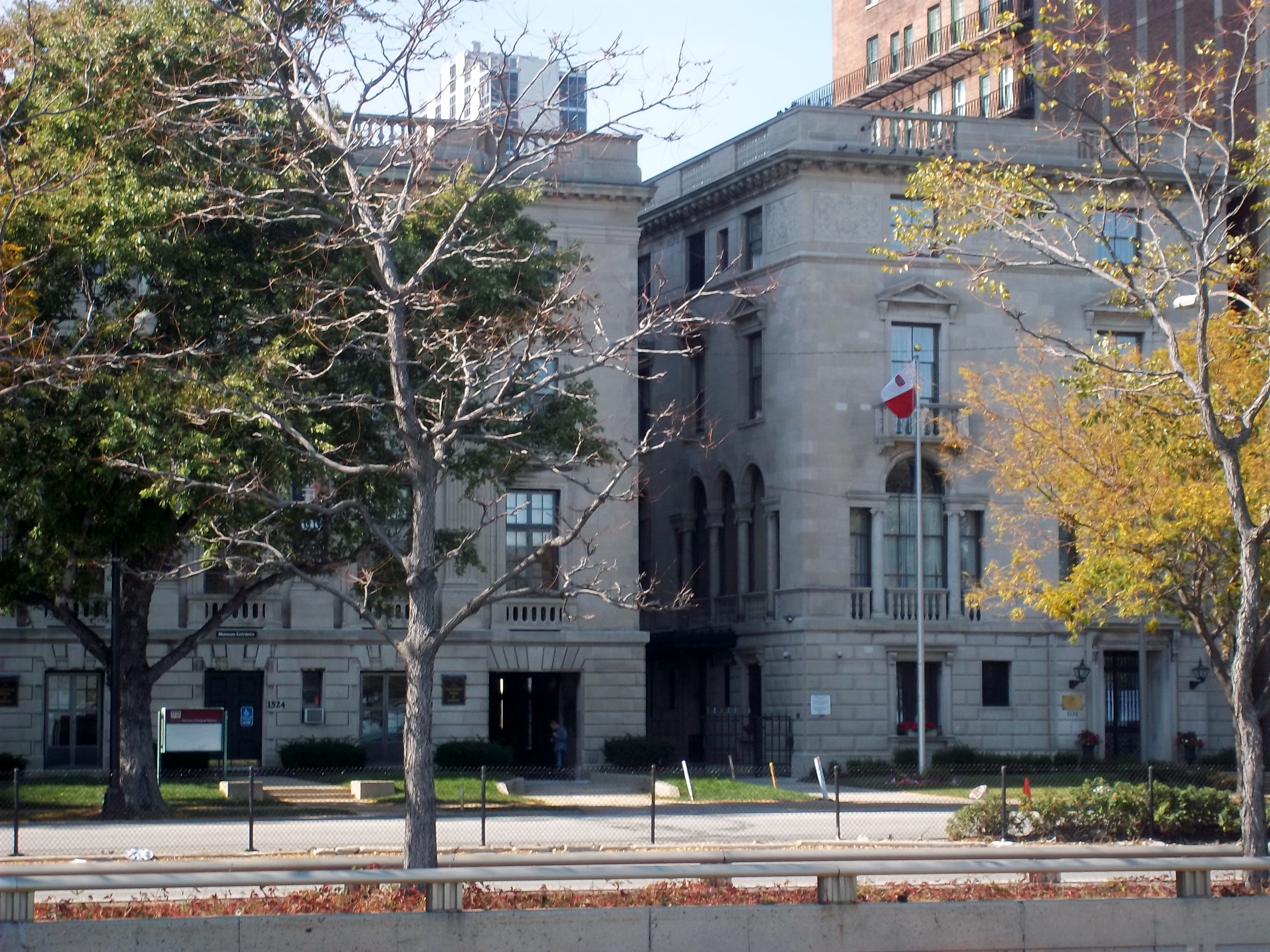
Consulate-General in Chicago

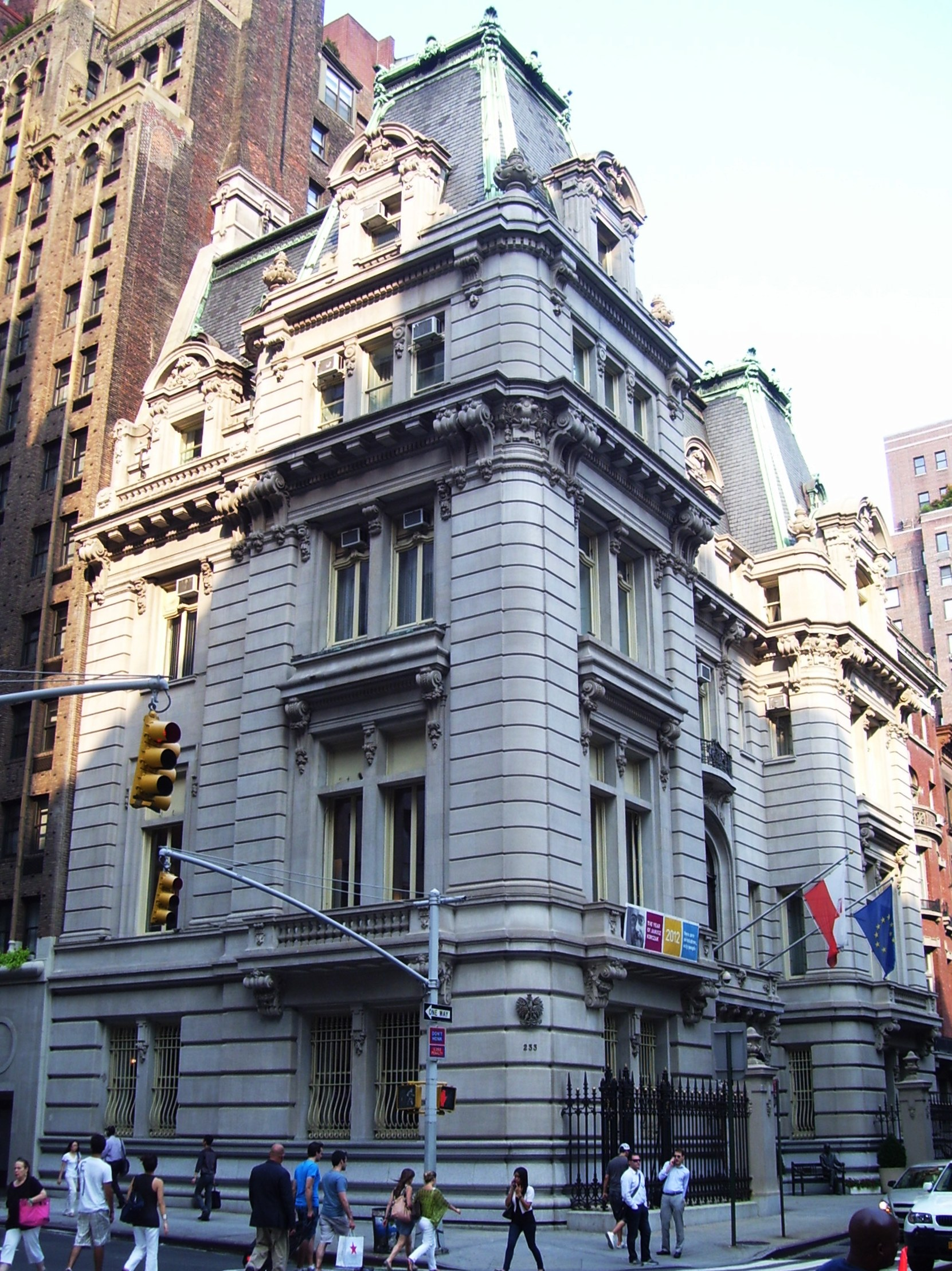
Consulate-General in New York City

=== Asia ===
Host country	Host city	Mission	Concurrent accreditation	Ref.
Armenia	Yerevan	Embassy		
Azerbaijan	Baku	Embassy	Countries: Turkmenistan	
China	Beijing	Embassy		
China	Guangzhou	Consulate-General		
China	Hong Kong	Consulate-General		
China	Shanghai	Consulate-General		
Georgia	Tbilisi	Embassy		
India	New Delhi	Embassy	Countries: Afghanistan; Bangladesh; Bhutan; Maldives; Nepal; Sri Lanka	
India	Mumbai	Consulate-General	Countries: Afghanistan; Bangladesh; Bhutan; Maldives; Nepal; Sri Lanka	
Indonesia	Jakarta	Embassy	Countries: Timor-Leste; International Organizations: Association of Southeast Asian Nations	
Iran	Tehran	Embassy		
Iraq	Baghdad	Embassy		
Iraq	Erbil	Consulate-General		
Israel	Tel Aviv	Embassy		
Japan	Tokyo	Embassy		
Jordan	Amman	Embassy		
Kazakhstan	Astana	Embassy	Countries: Kyrgyzstan	
Kazakhstan	Almaty	Consulate-General	Countries: Kyrgyzstan	
Kuwait	Kuwait City	Embassy	Countries: Bahrain	
Lebanon	Beirut	Embassy		
Malaysia	Kuala Lumpur	Embassy	Countries: Brunei	
Mongolia	Ulaanbaatar	Embassy		
North Korea	Pyongyang	Embassy		
Pakistan	Islamabad	Embassy		
Palestine	Ramallah	Representative office		
Philippines	Manila	Embassy	Countries: Palau	
Qatar	Doha	Embassy		
Saudi Arabia	Riyadh	Embassy	Countries: Oman; Yemen	
Singapore	Singapore	Embassy		
South Korea	Seoul	Embassy		
Syria	Damascus	Embassy		
Republic of China (Taiwan)	Taipei	Office		
Thailand	Bangkok	Embassy	Countries: Cambodia; Laos; Myanmar	
Turkey	Ankara	Embassy		
Turkey	Istanbul	Consulate-General		
United Arab Emirates	Abu Dhabi	Embassy		
Uzbekistan	Tashkent	Embassy	Countries: Tajikistan	
Vietnam	Hanoi	Embassy		

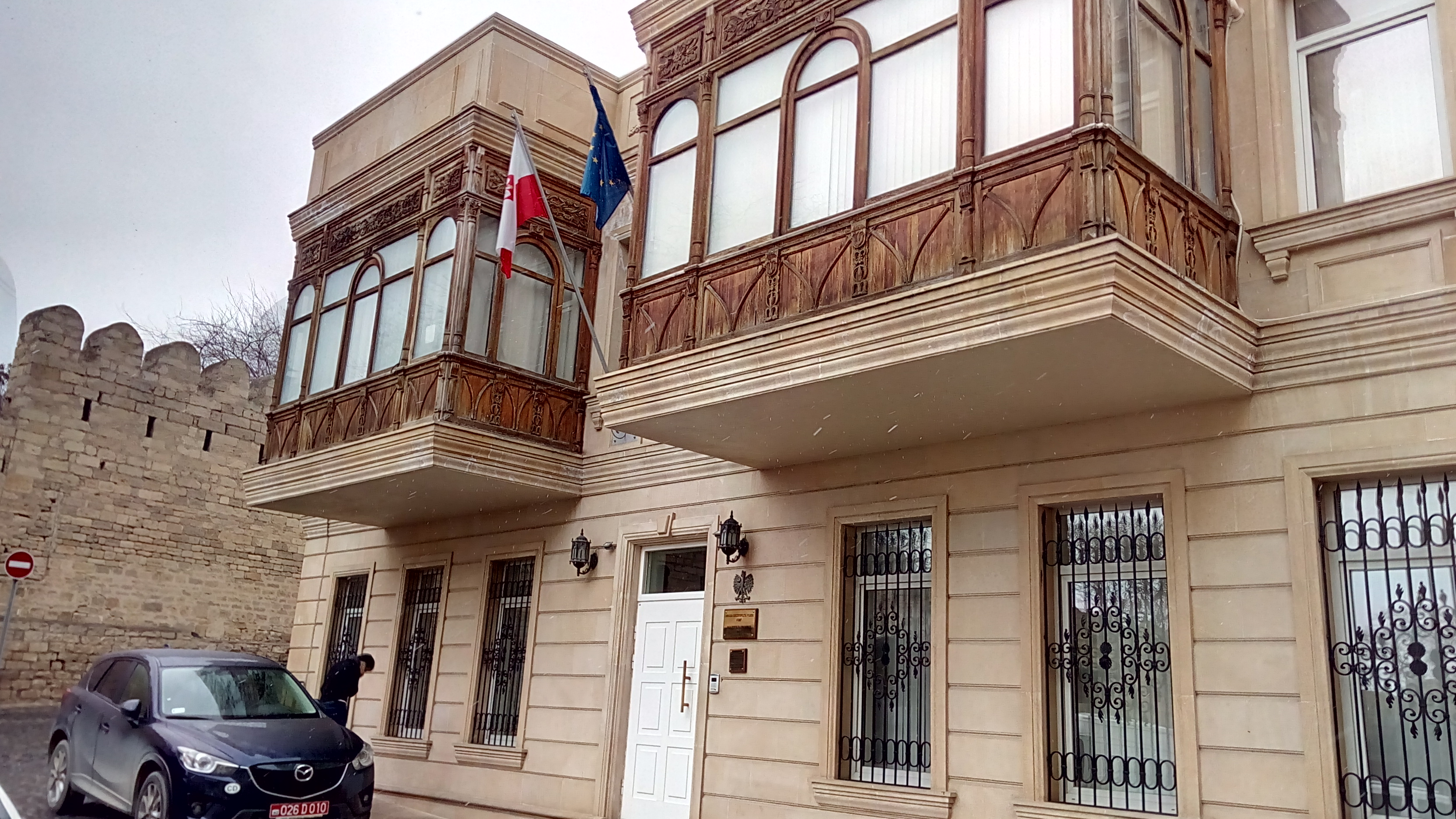
Embassy in Baku

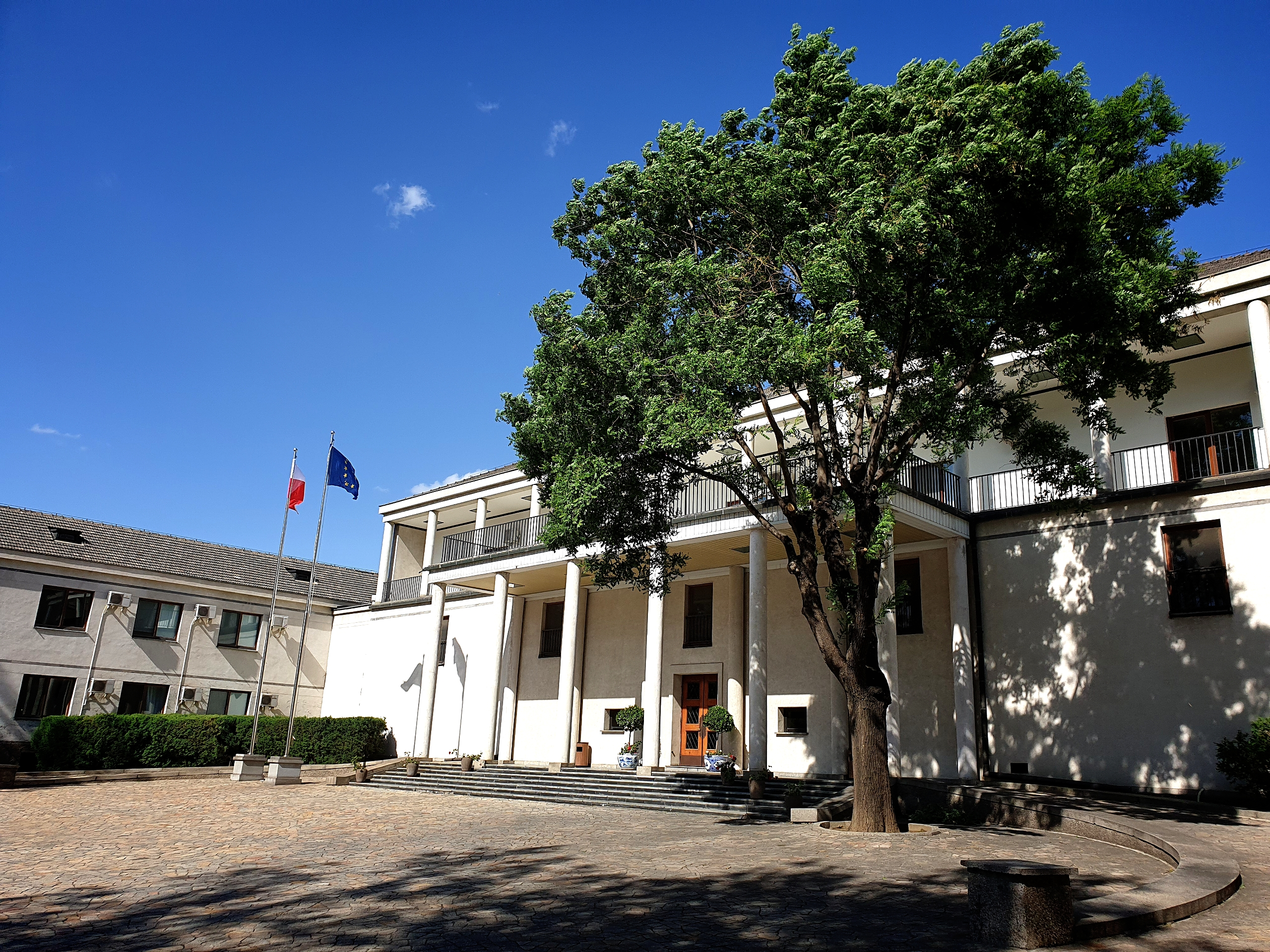
Embassy in Beijing

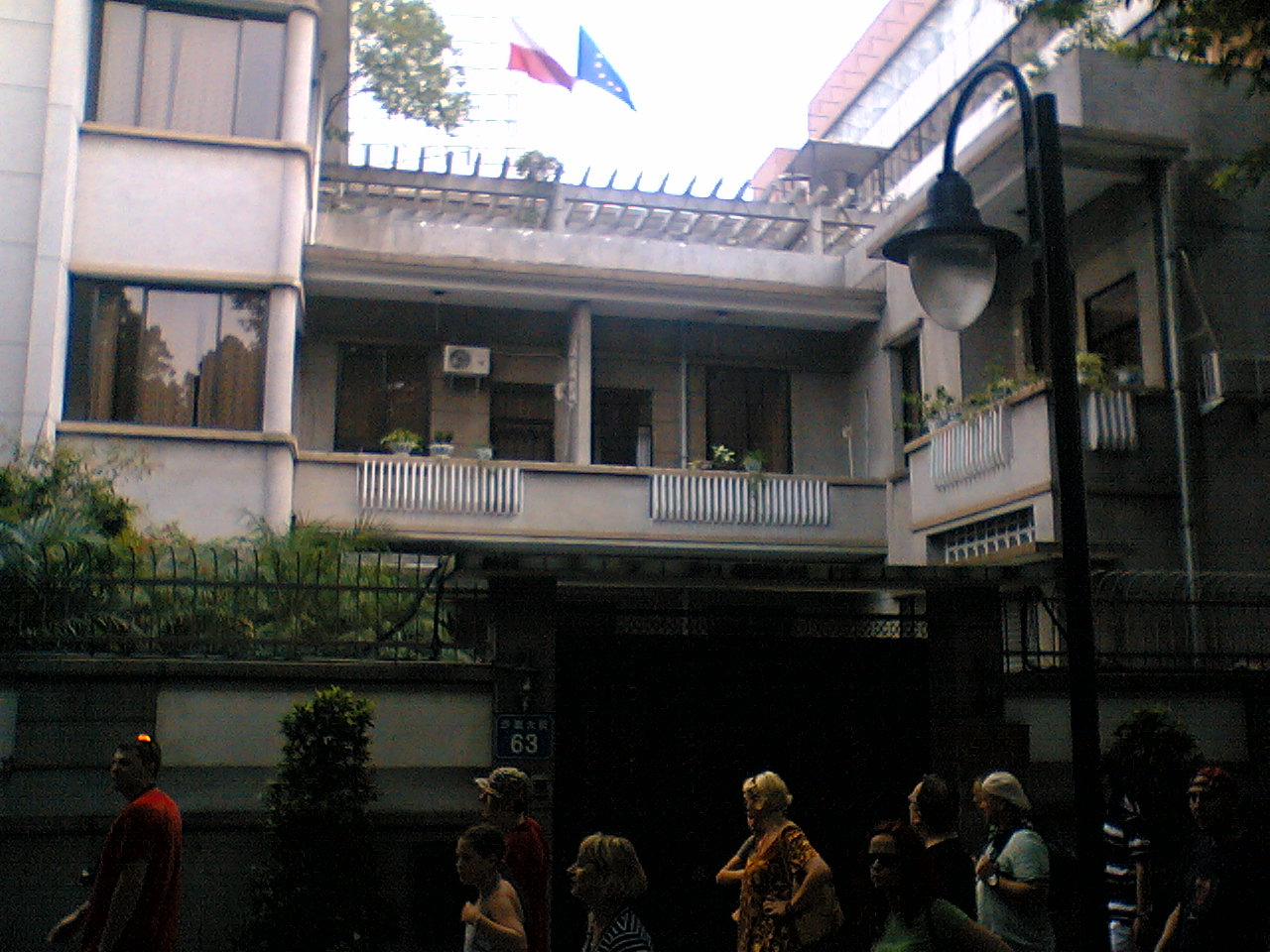
Consulate-General in Guangzhou

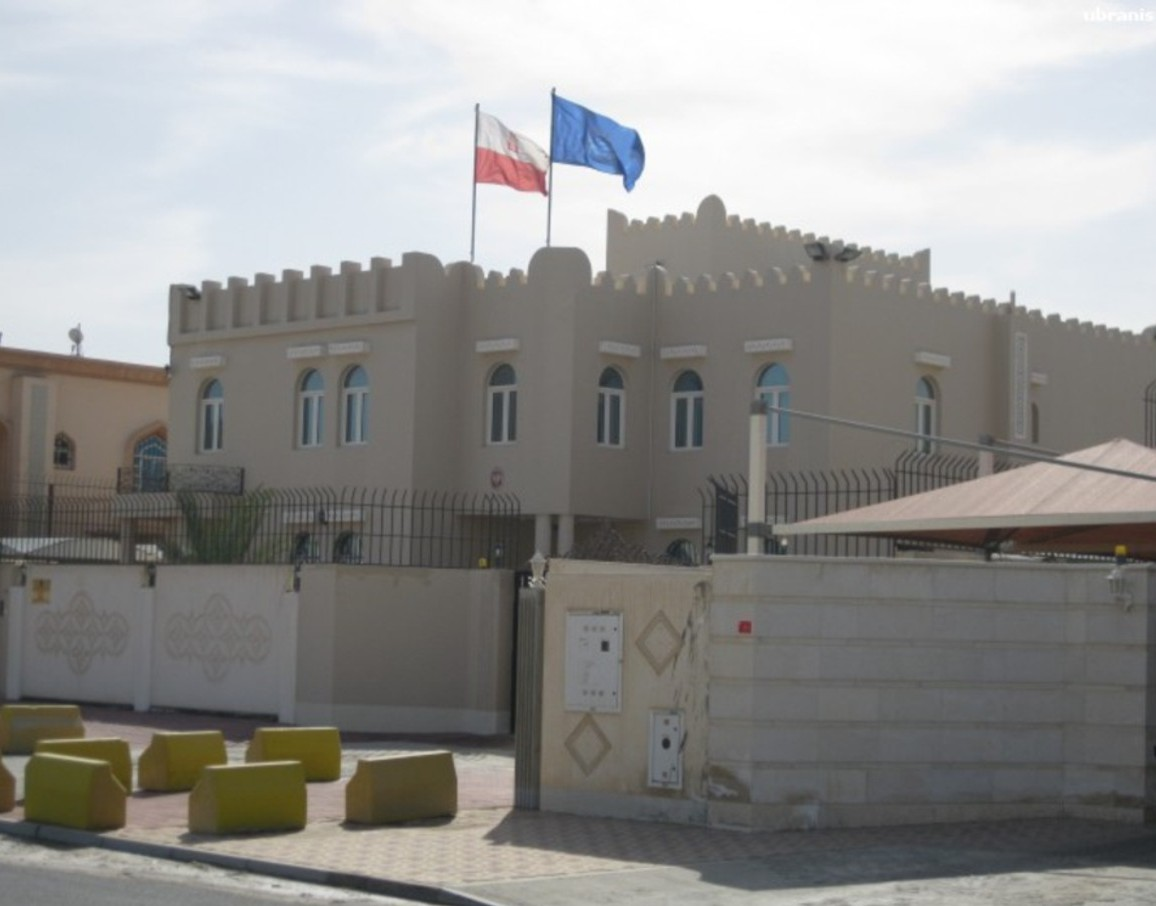
Embassy in Doha

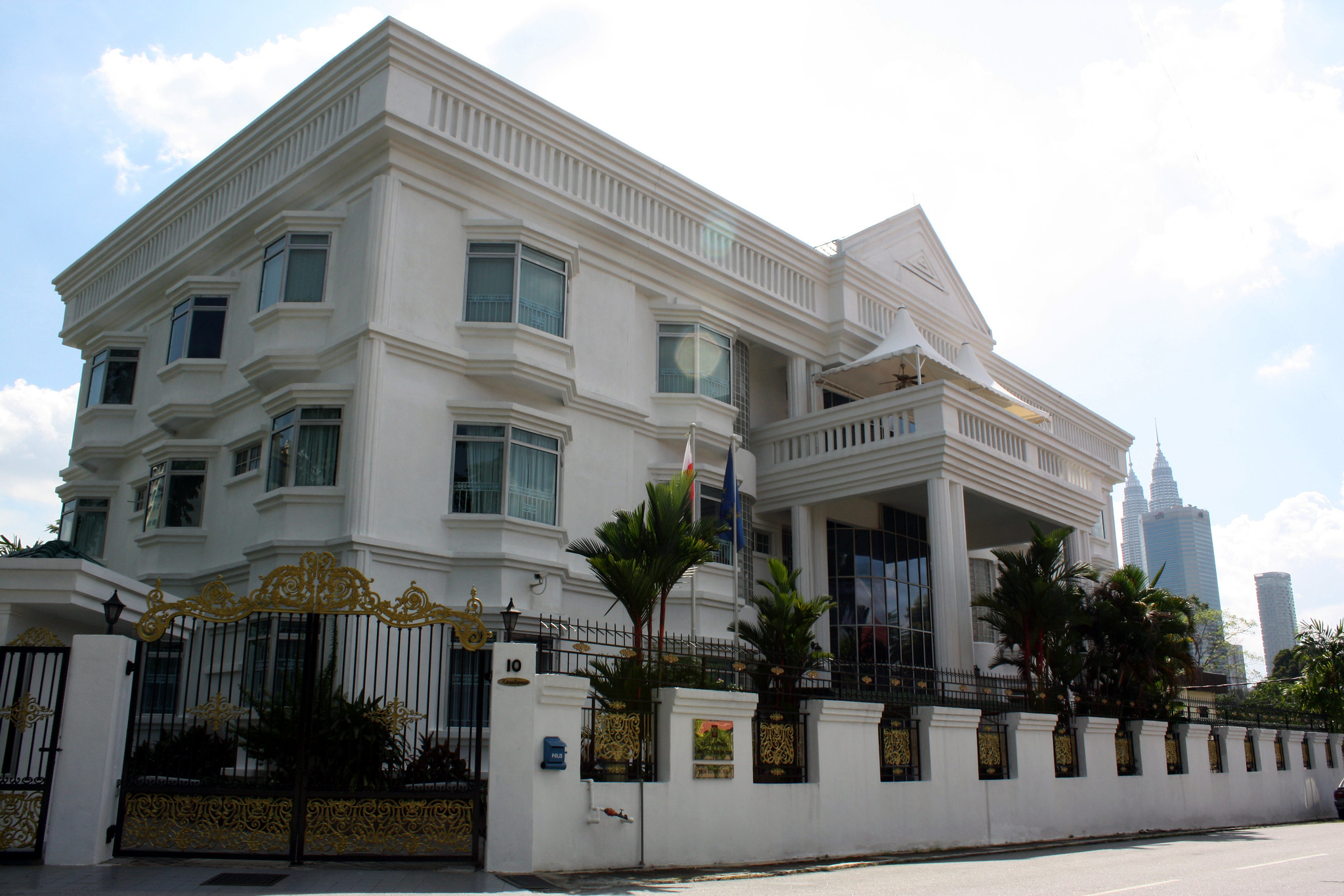
Embassy in Kuala Lumpur

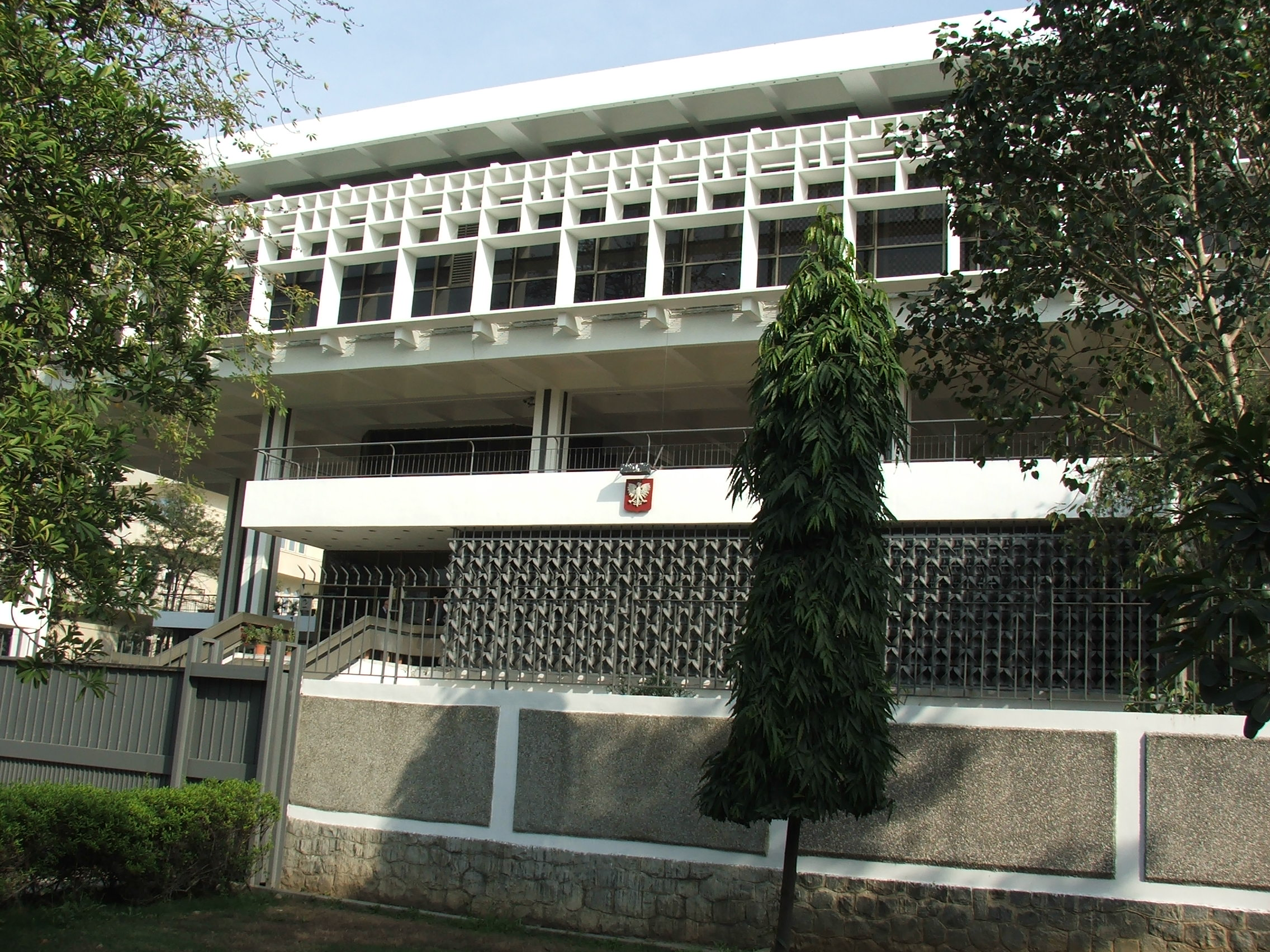
Embassy in New Delhi

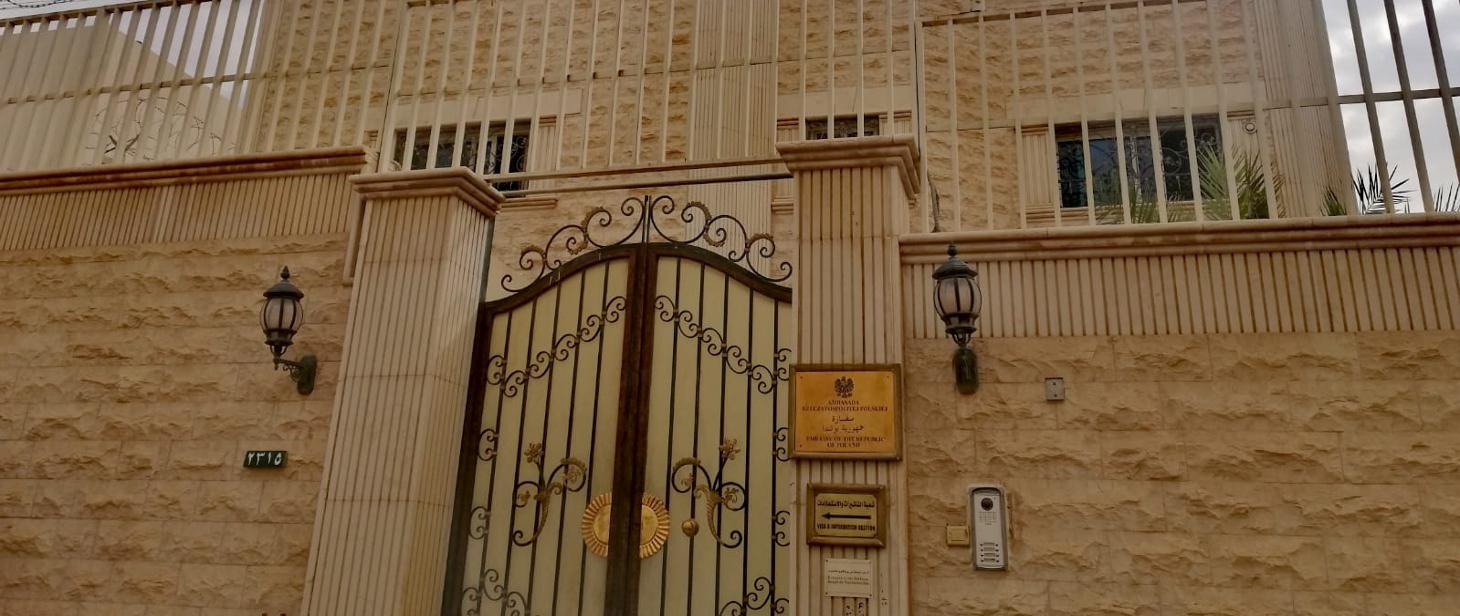
Embassy in Riyadh

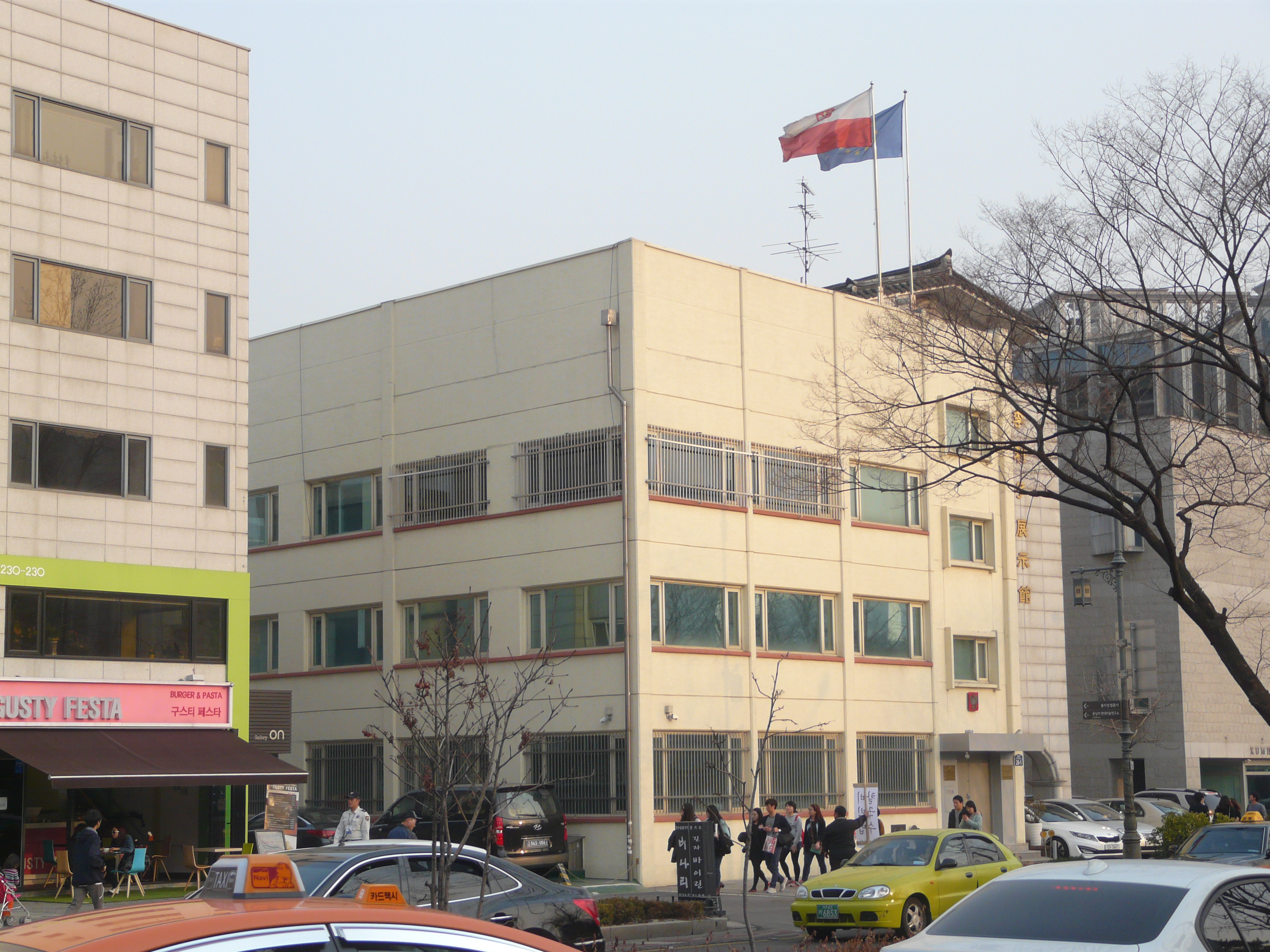
Embassy in Seoul

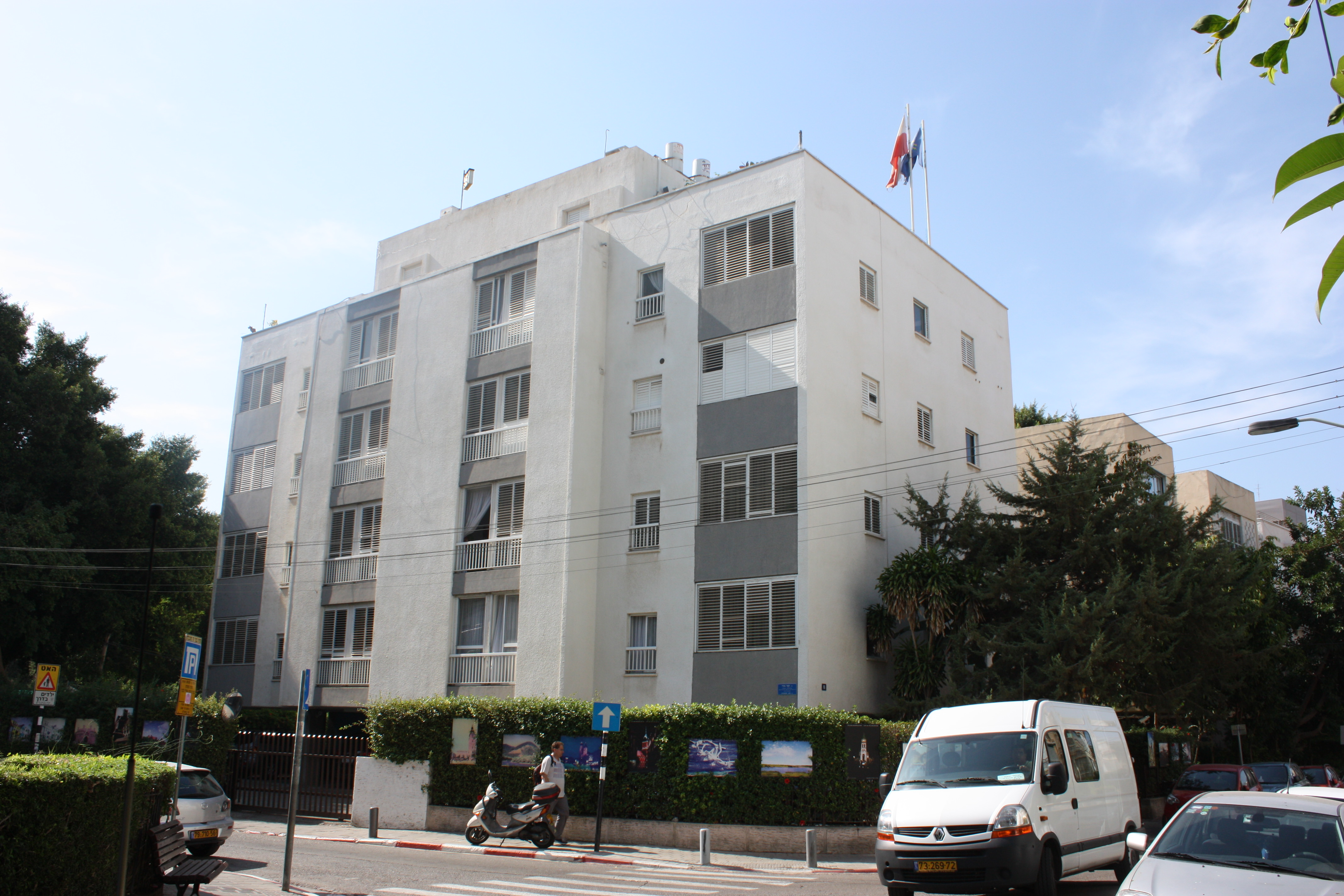
Embassy in Tel Aviv

Embassy in Tokyo

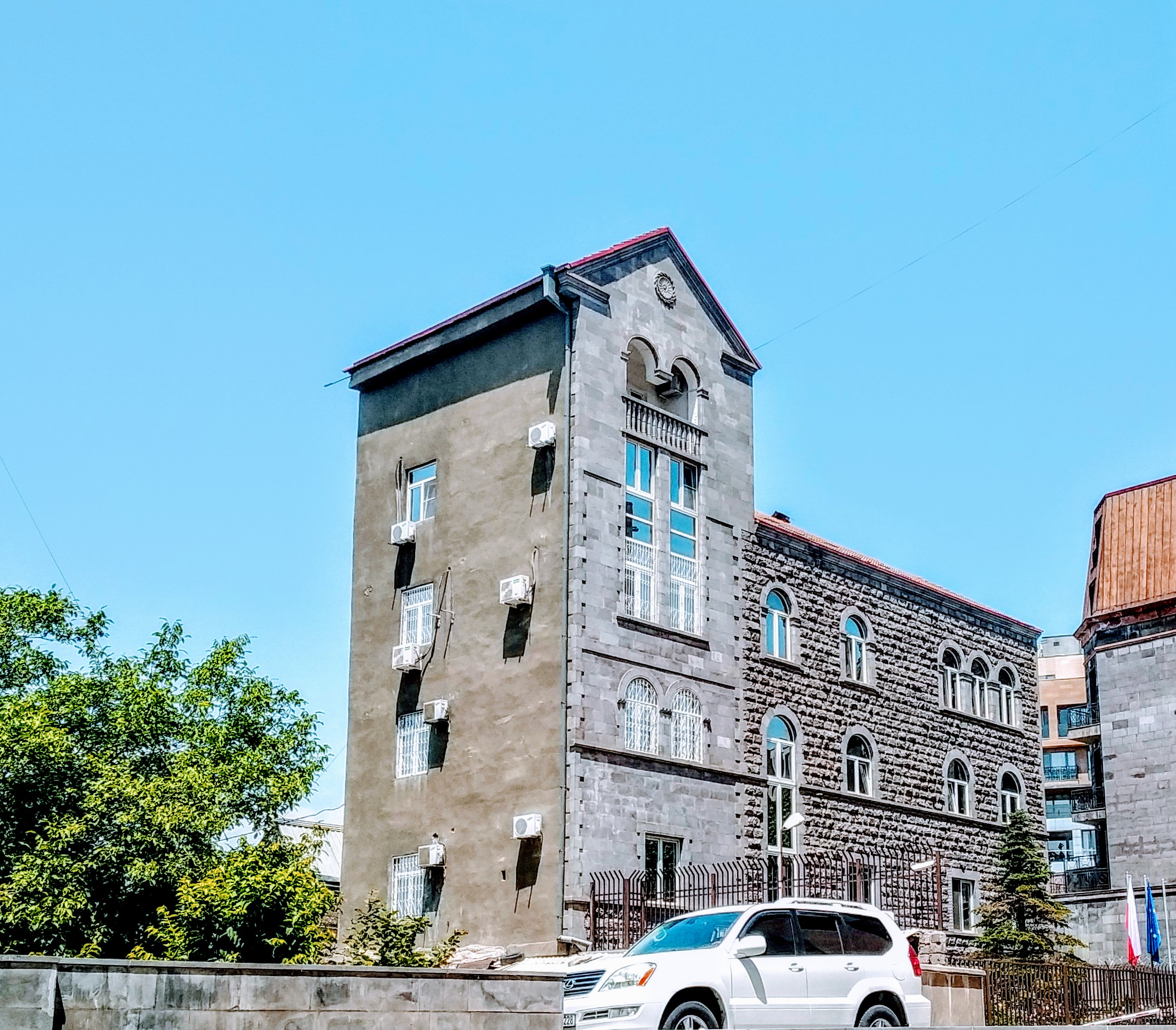
Embassy in Yerevan

=== Europe ===
Host country	Host city	Mission	Concurrent accreditation	Ref.
Albania	Tirana	Embassy		
Austria	Vienna	Embassy		
Belarus	Minsk	Embassy		
Belarus	Brest	Consulate-General		
Belarus	Grodno	Consulate-General		
Belgium	Brussels	Embassy		
Bosnia and Herzegovina	Sarajevo	Embassy		
Bulgaria	Sofia	Embassy		
Croatia	Zagreb	Embassy		
Cyprus	Nicosia	Embassy		
Czech Republic	Prague	Embassy		
Czech Republic	Ostrava	Consulate-General		
Denmark	Copenhagen	Embassy		
Estonia	Tallinn	Embassy		
Finland	Helsinki	Embassy		
France	Paris	Embassy	Countries: Monaco	
France	Lyon	Consulate-General	Countries: Monaco	
Germany	Berlin	Embassy		
Germany	Cologne	Consulate-General		
Germany	Hamburg	Consulate-General		
Germany	Munich	Consulate-General		
Greece	Athens	Embassy		
Holy See (Note: The Polish Embassy to the Holy See is located outside Vatican territory in Rome.)	Rome	Embassy	Sovereign Entity: Sovereign Military Order of Malta	
Hungary	Budapest	Embassy		
Iceland	Reykjavík	Embassy		
Ireland	Dublin	Embassy		
Italy	Rome	Embassy	Countries: San Marino	
Italy	Milan	Consulate-General	Countries: San Marino	
Latvia	Riga	Embassy		
Lithuania	Vilnius	Embassy		
Luxembourg	Luxembourg	Embassy		
Malta	Valletta	Embassy		
Moldova	Chişinău	Embassy		
Montenegro	Podgorica	Embassy		
Netherlands	The Hague	Embassy	International Organizations: Organisation for the Prohibition of Chemical Weapons	
North Macedonia	Skopje	Embassy	Countries: Kosovo	
Norway	Oslo	Embassy		
Portugal	Lisbon	Embassy		
Romania	Bucharest	Embassy		
Russia	Moscow	Embassy		
Serbia	Belgrade	Embassy		
Slovakia	Bratislava	Embassy		
Slovenia	Ljubljana	Embassy		
Spain	Madrid	Embassy	Countries: Andorra	
Spain	Barcelona	Consulate-General	Countries: Andorra	
Sweden	Stockholm	Embassy		
Switzerland	Bern	Embassy	Countries: Liechtenstein	
Ukraine	Kyiv	Embassy		
Ukraine	Kharkiv	Consulate-General		
Ukraine	Lutsk	Consulate-General		
Ukraine	Lviv	Consulate-General		
Ukraine	Odesa	Consulate-General		
Ukraine	Vinnytsia	Consulate-General		
United Kingdom	London	Embassy		
United Kingdom	Belfast	Consulate-General		
United Kingdom	Edinburgh	Consulate-General		
United Kingdom	Manchester	Consulate-General		

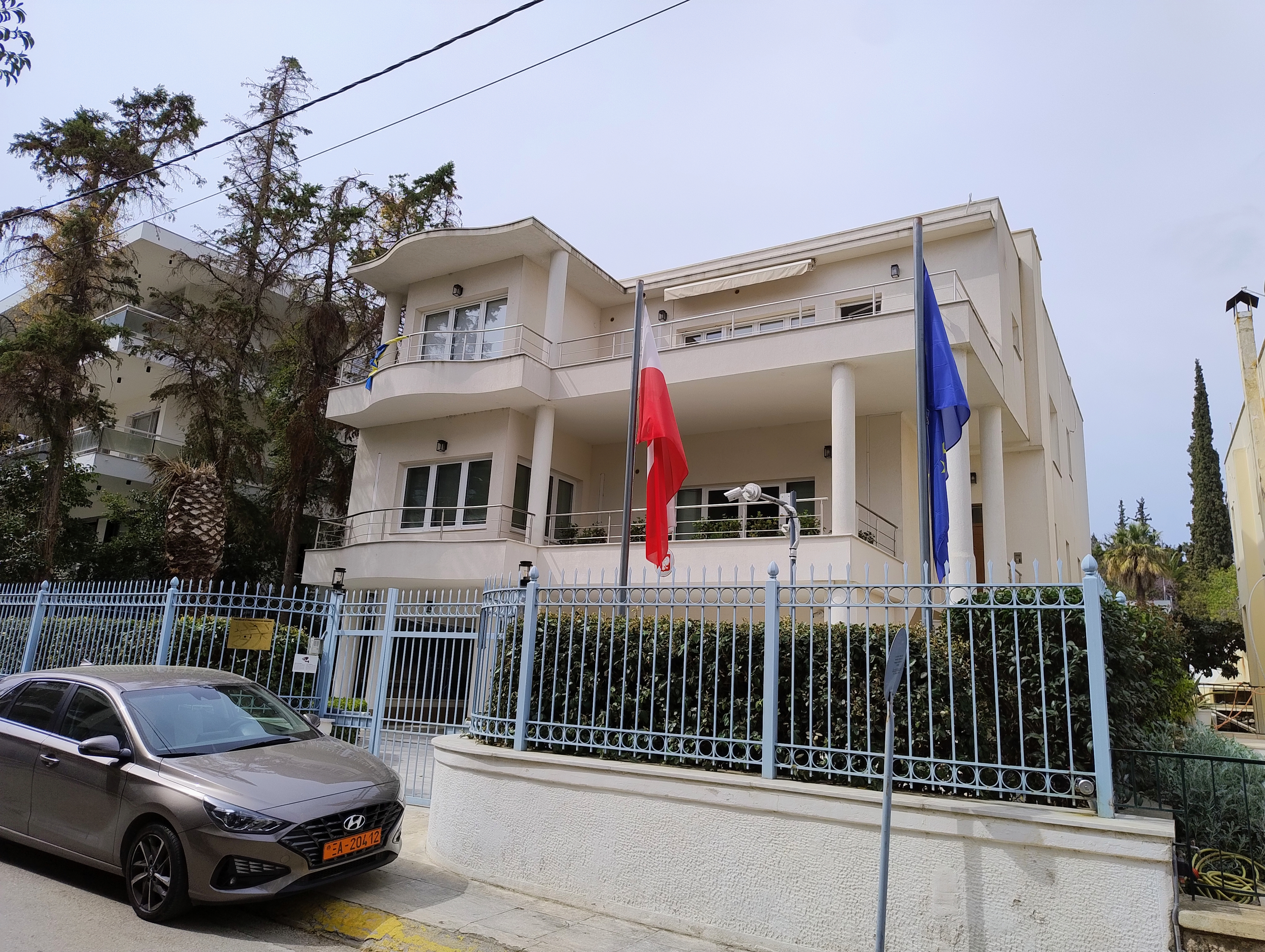
Embassy in Athens

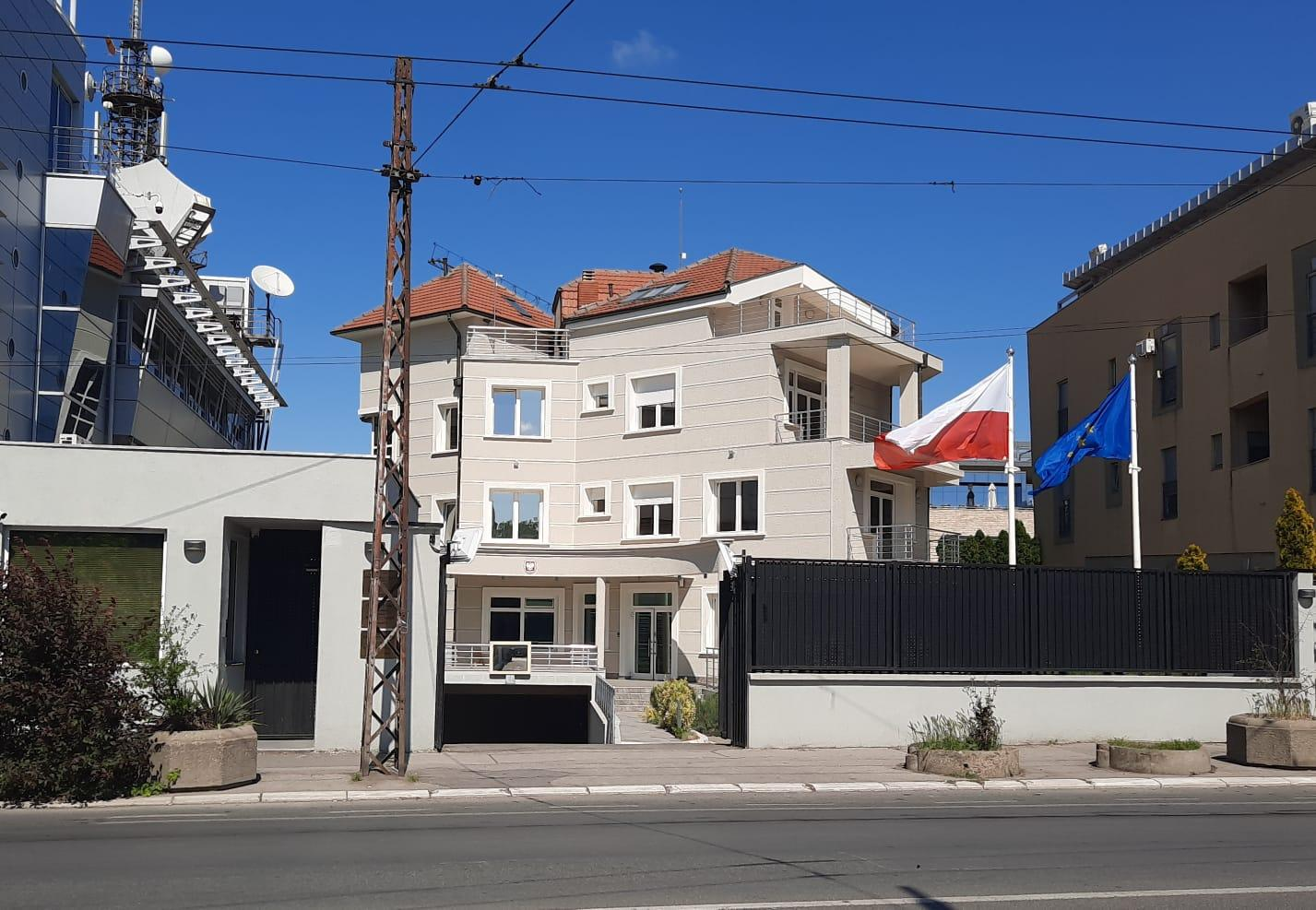
Embassy in Belgrade

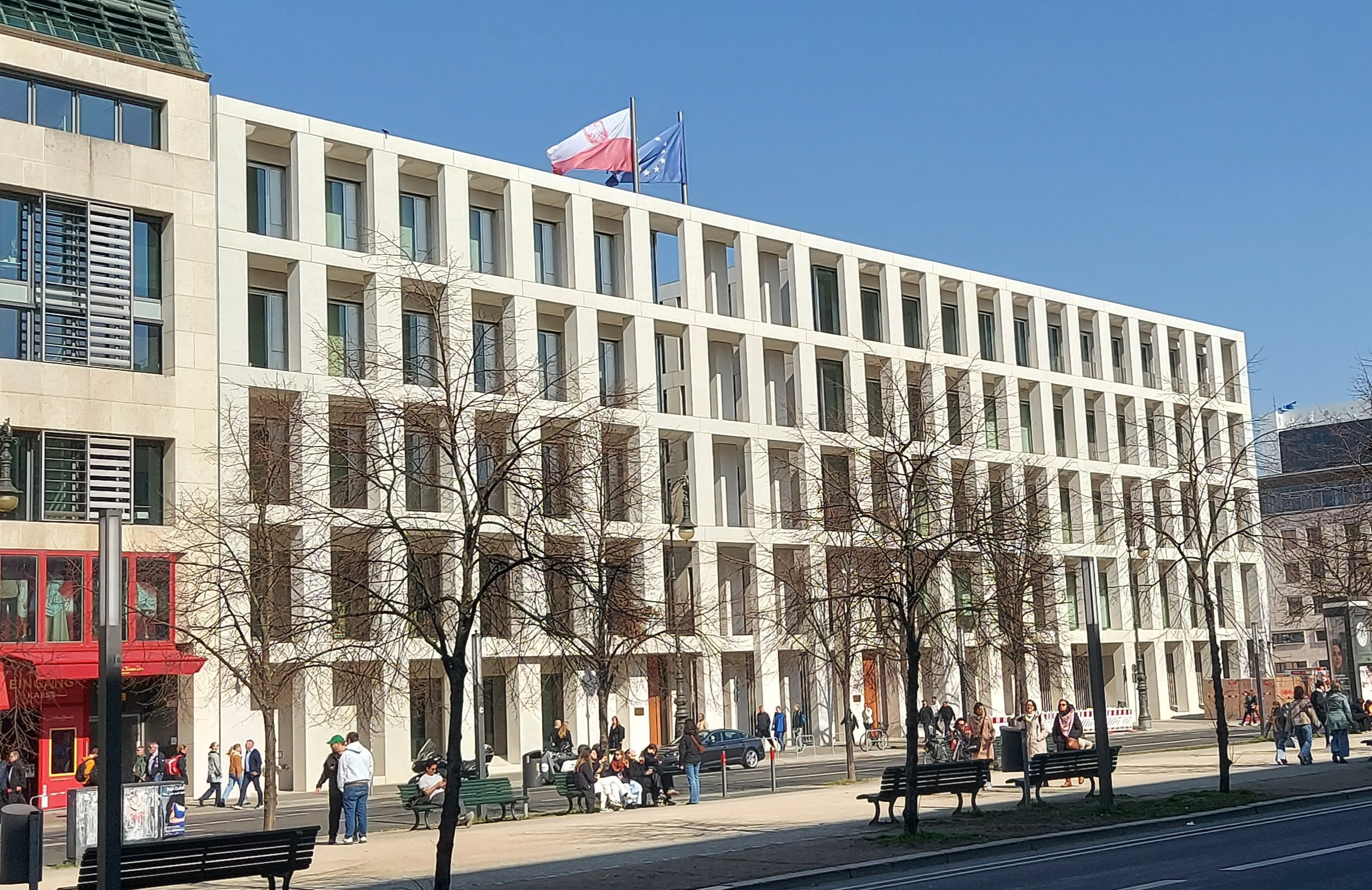
Embassy in Berlin

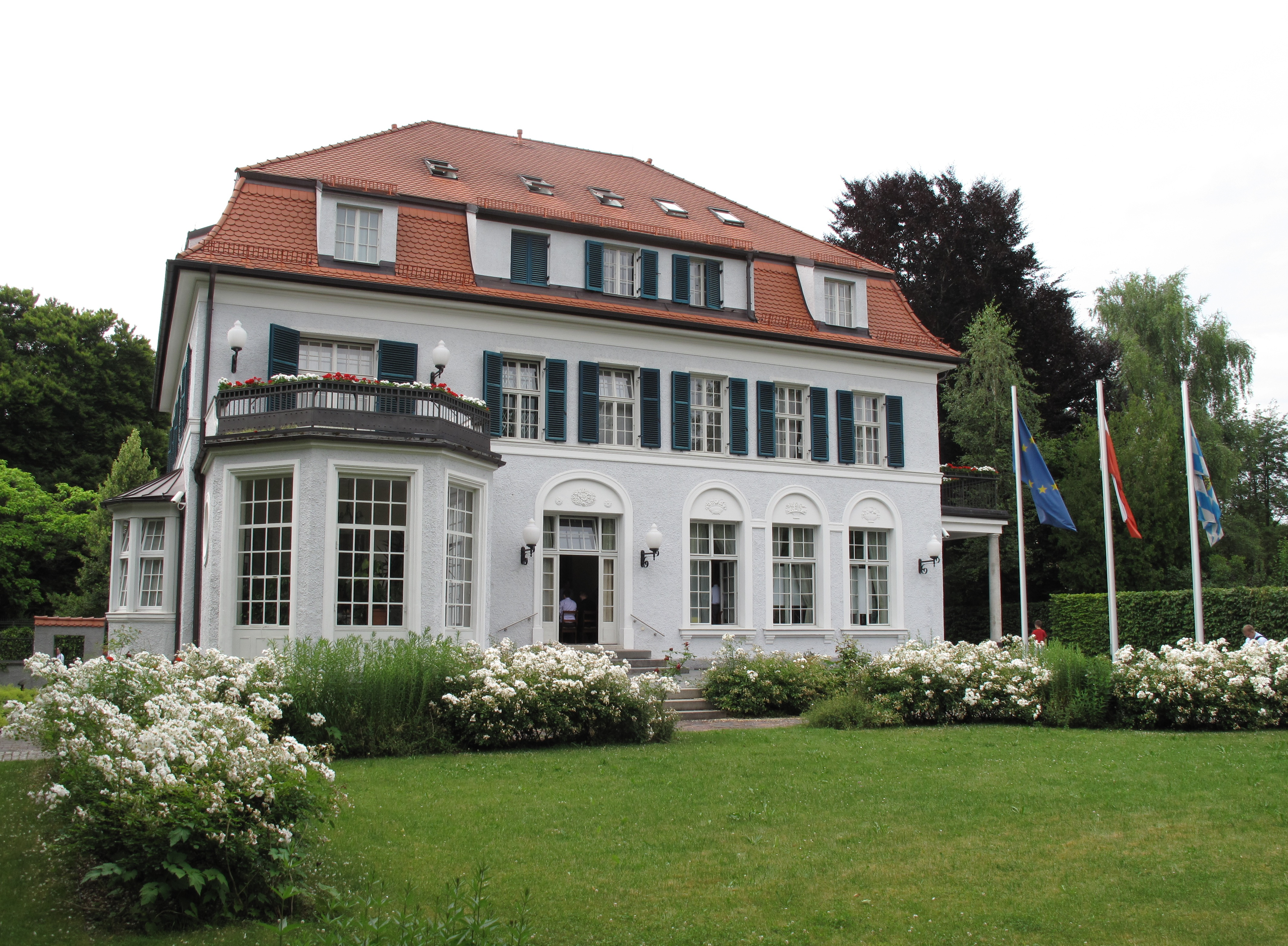
Consulate-General in Munich

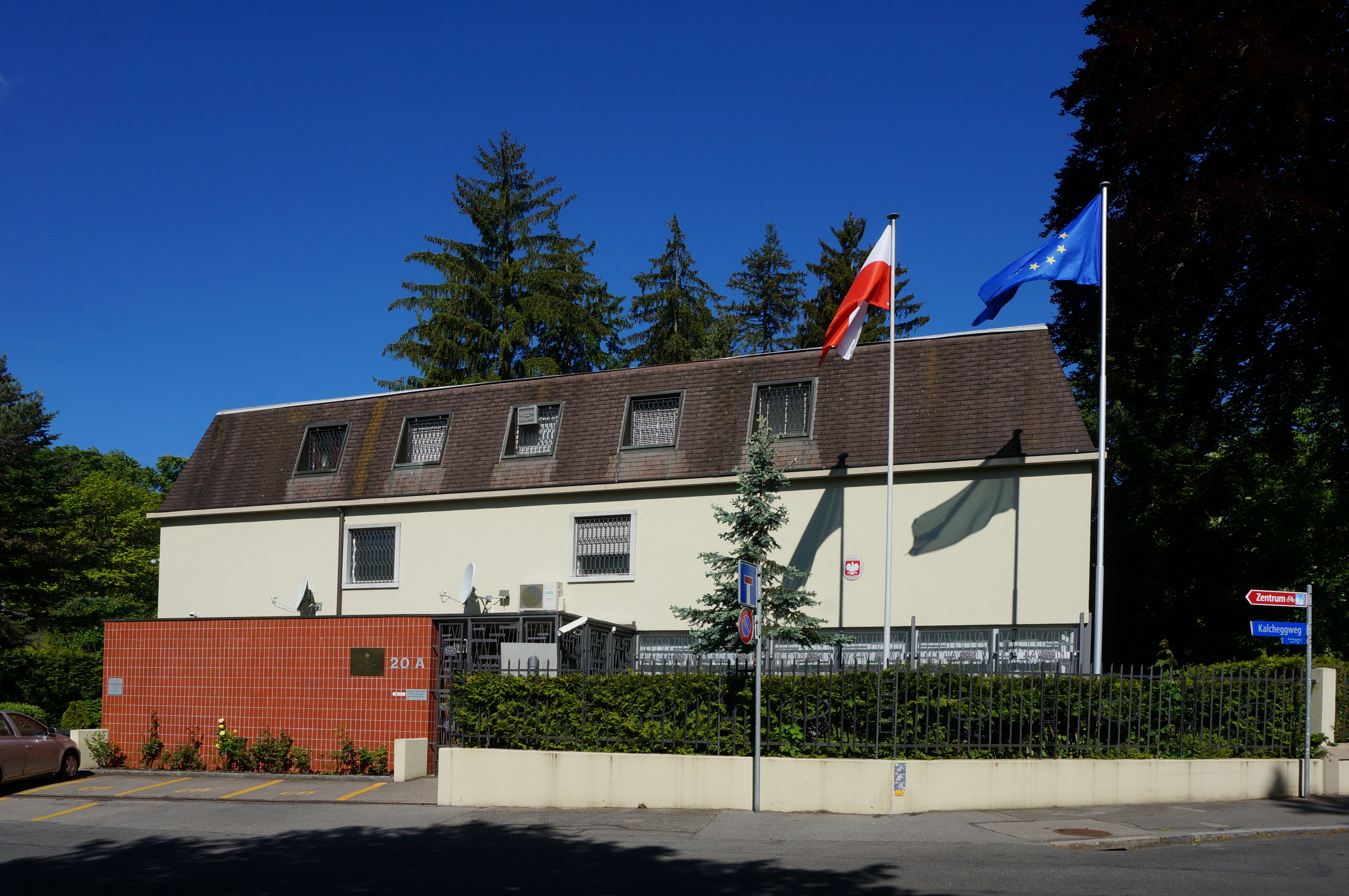
Embassy in Bern

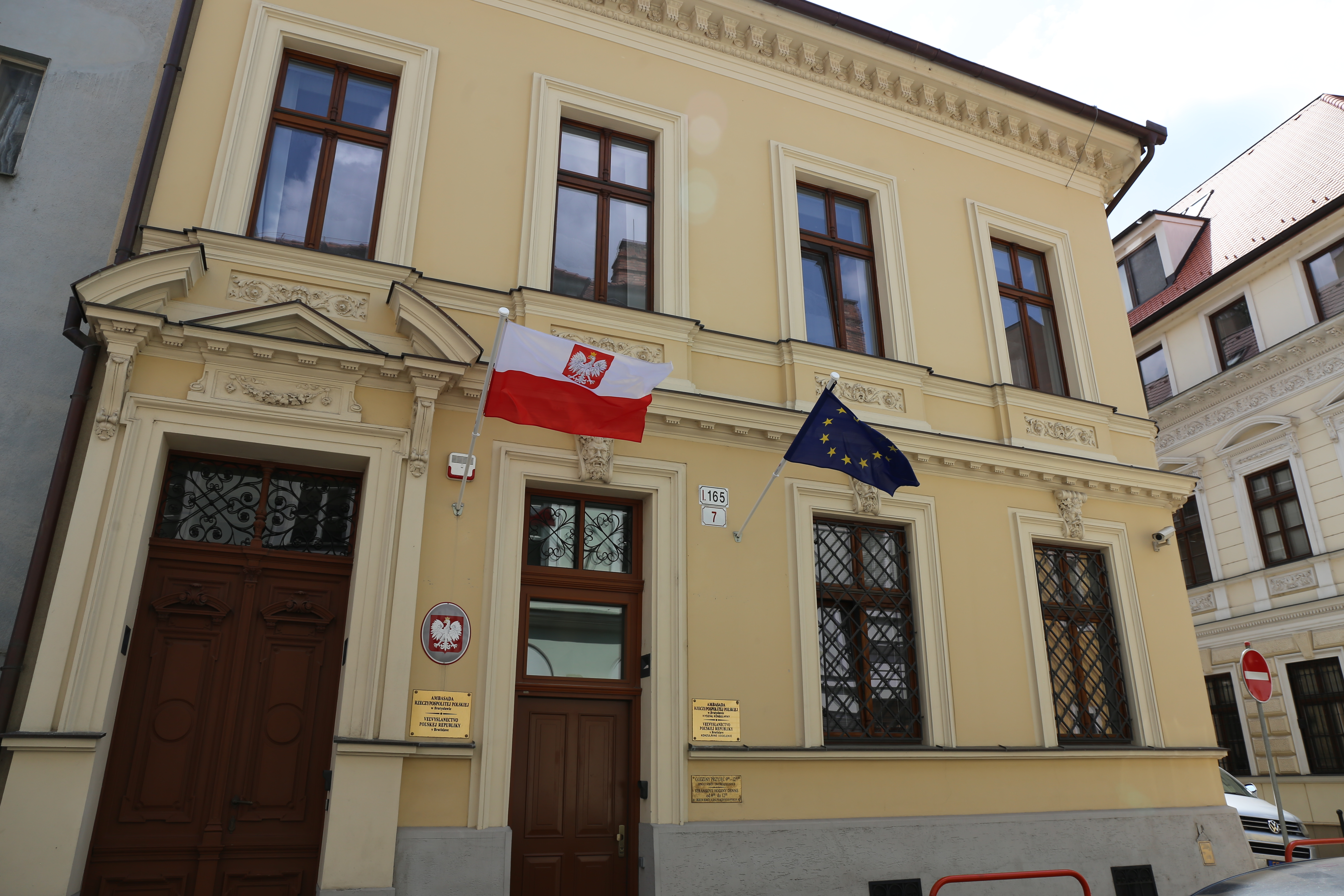
Embassy in Bratislava

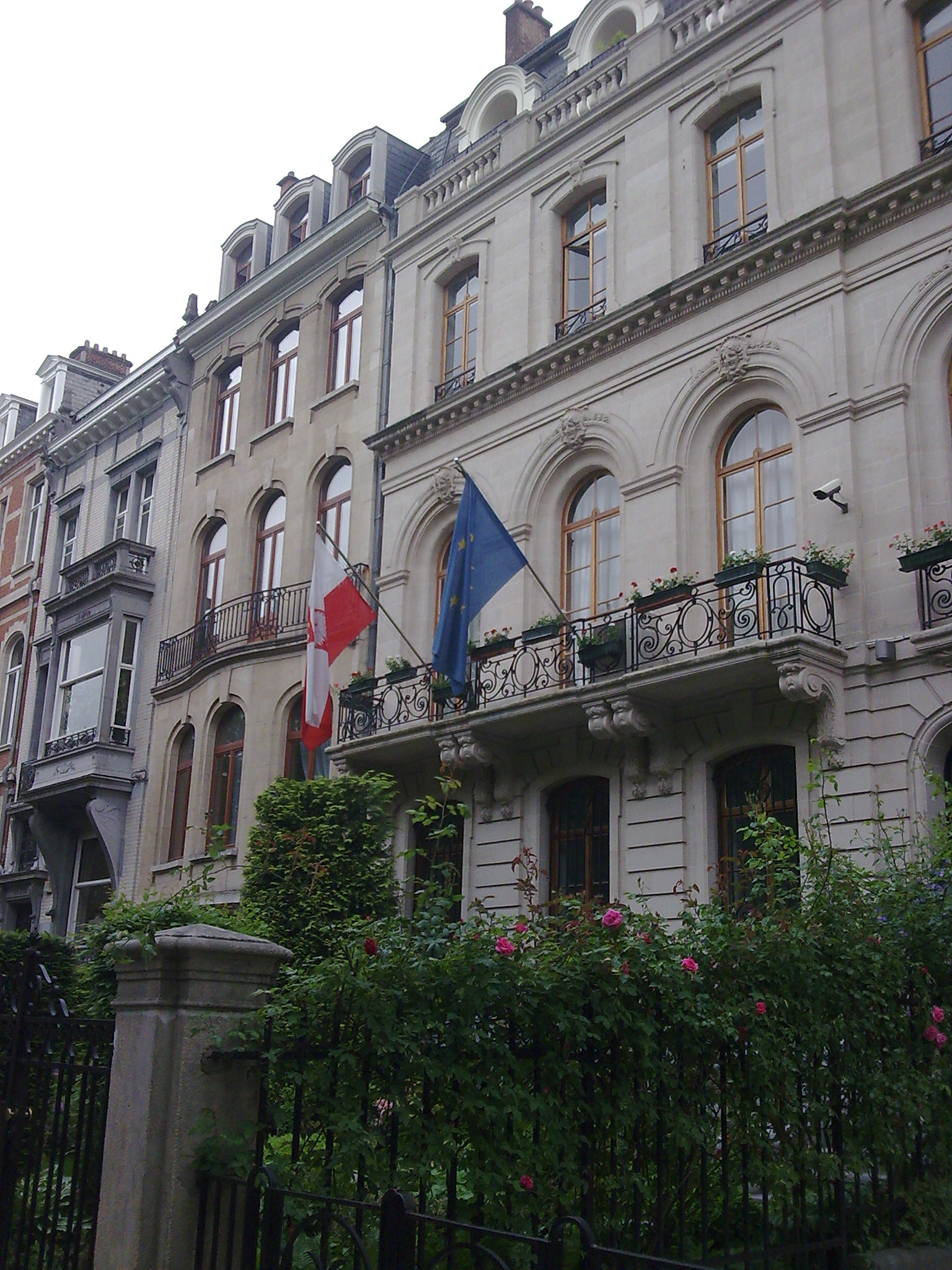
Embassy in Brussels

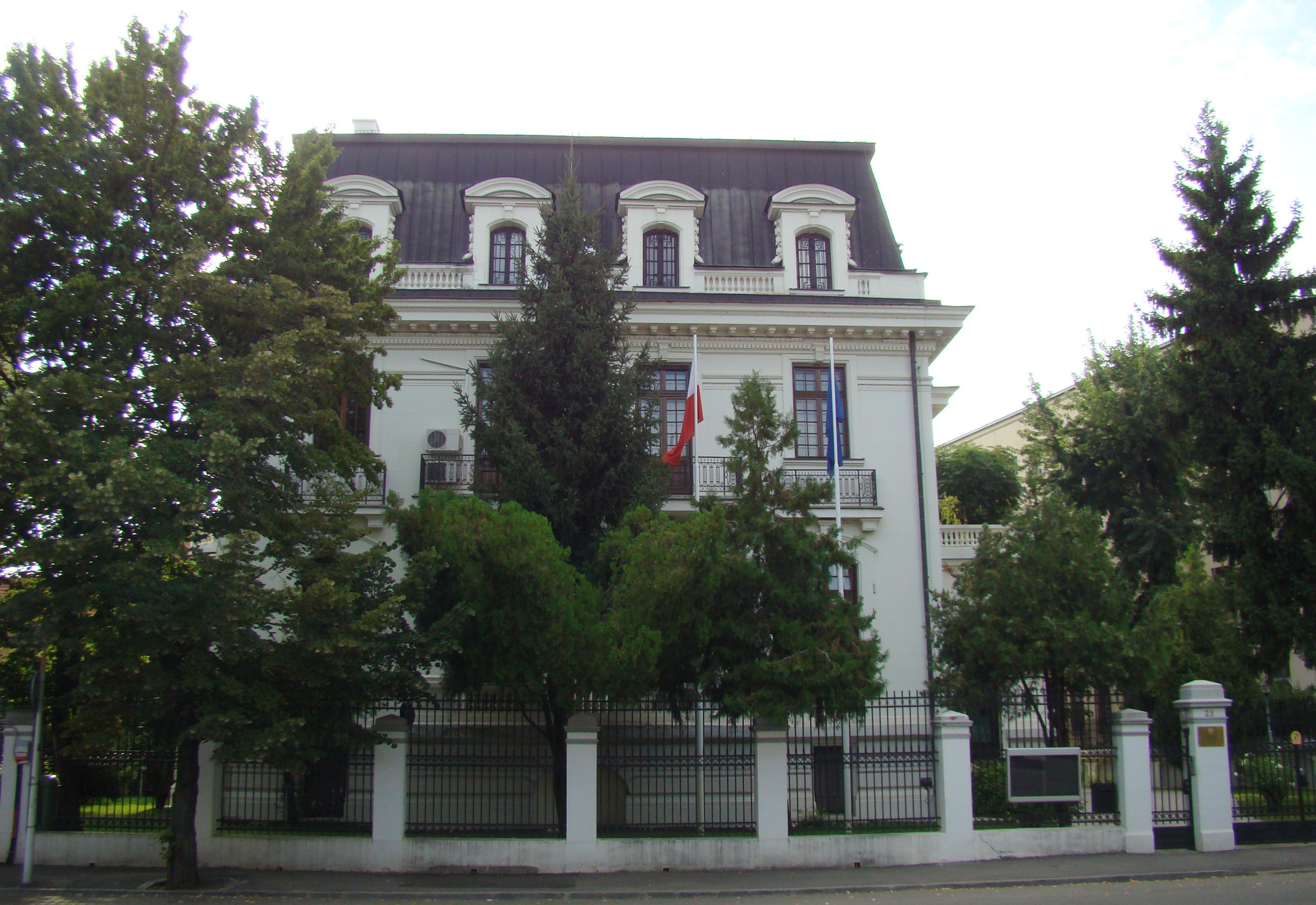
Embassy in Bucharest

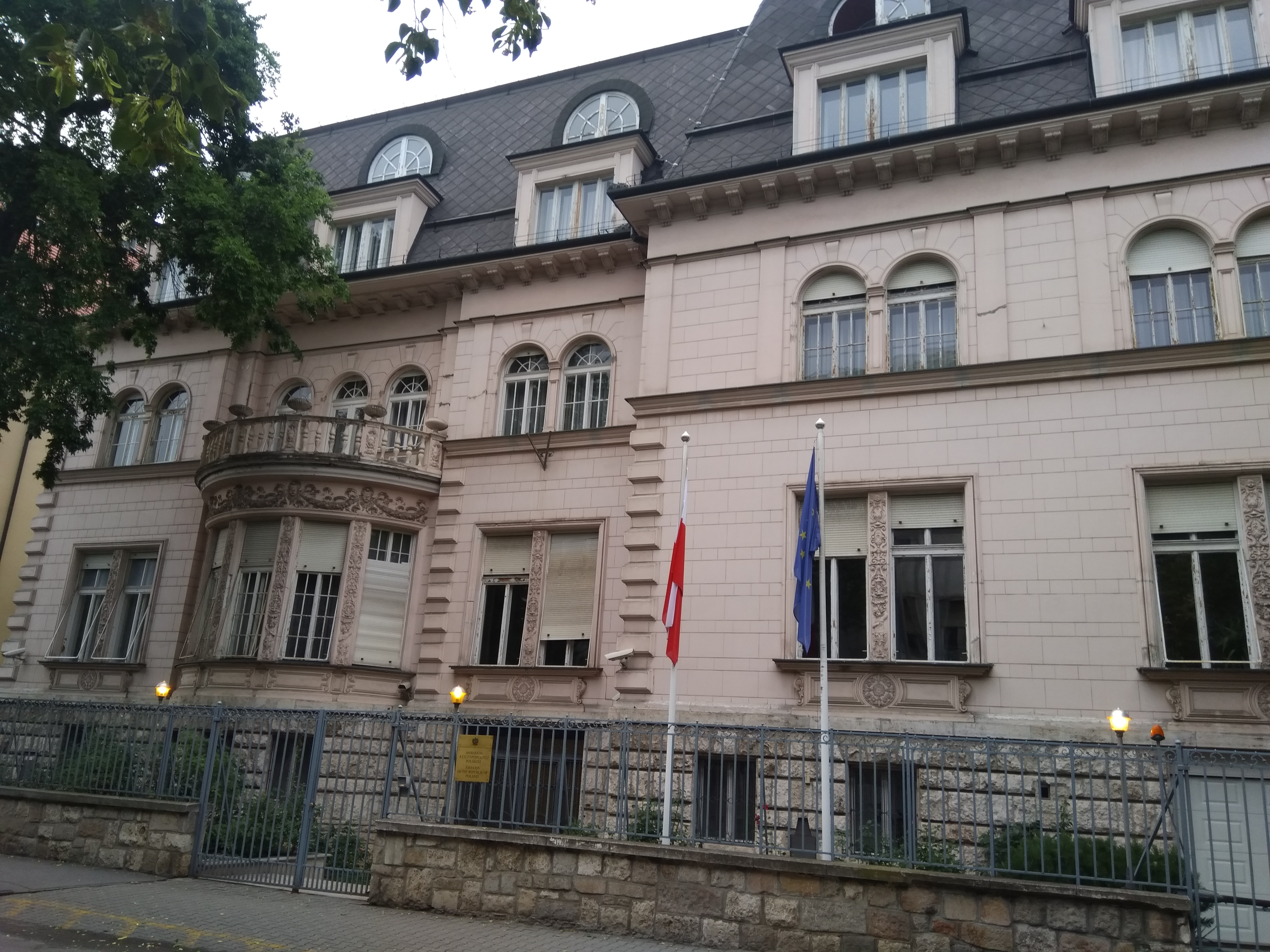
Embassy in Budapest

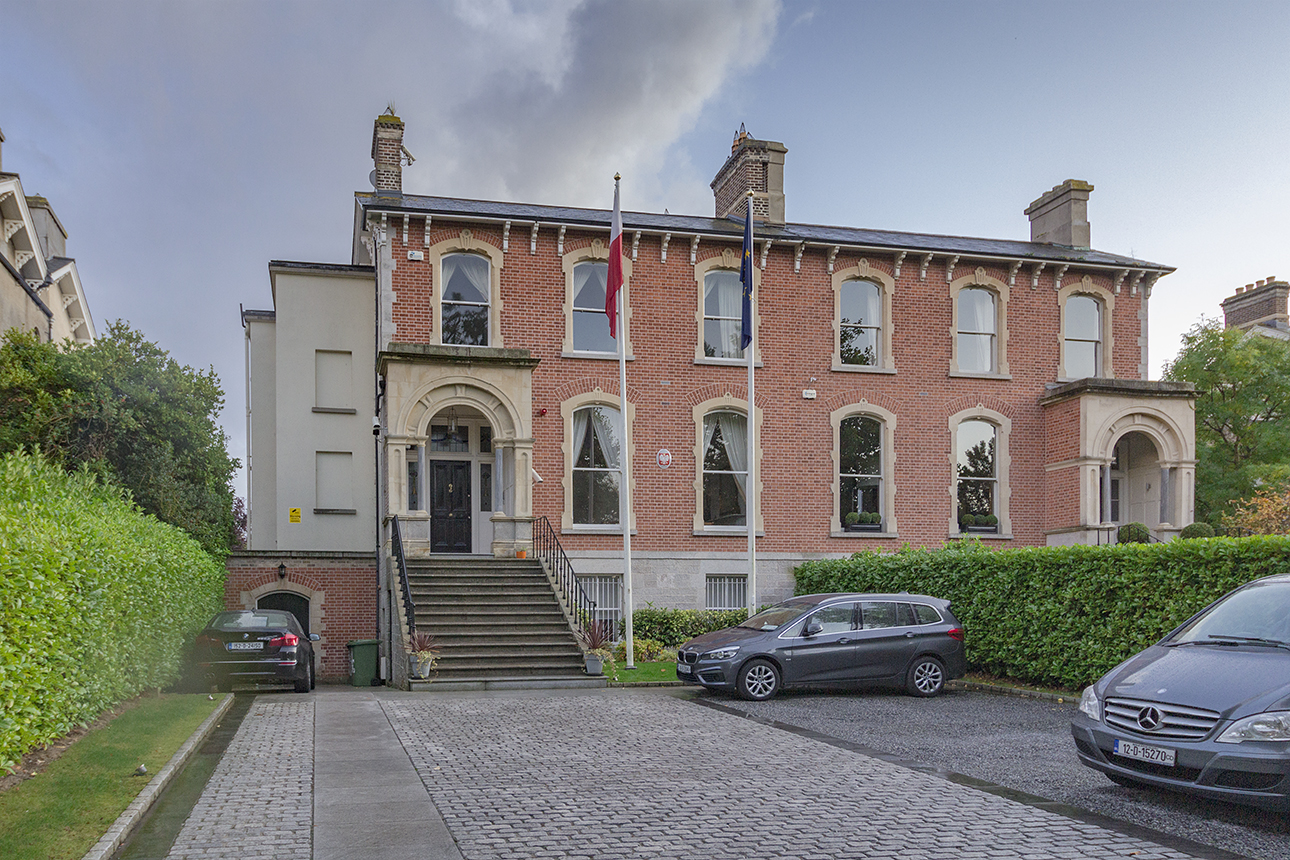
Embassy in Dublin

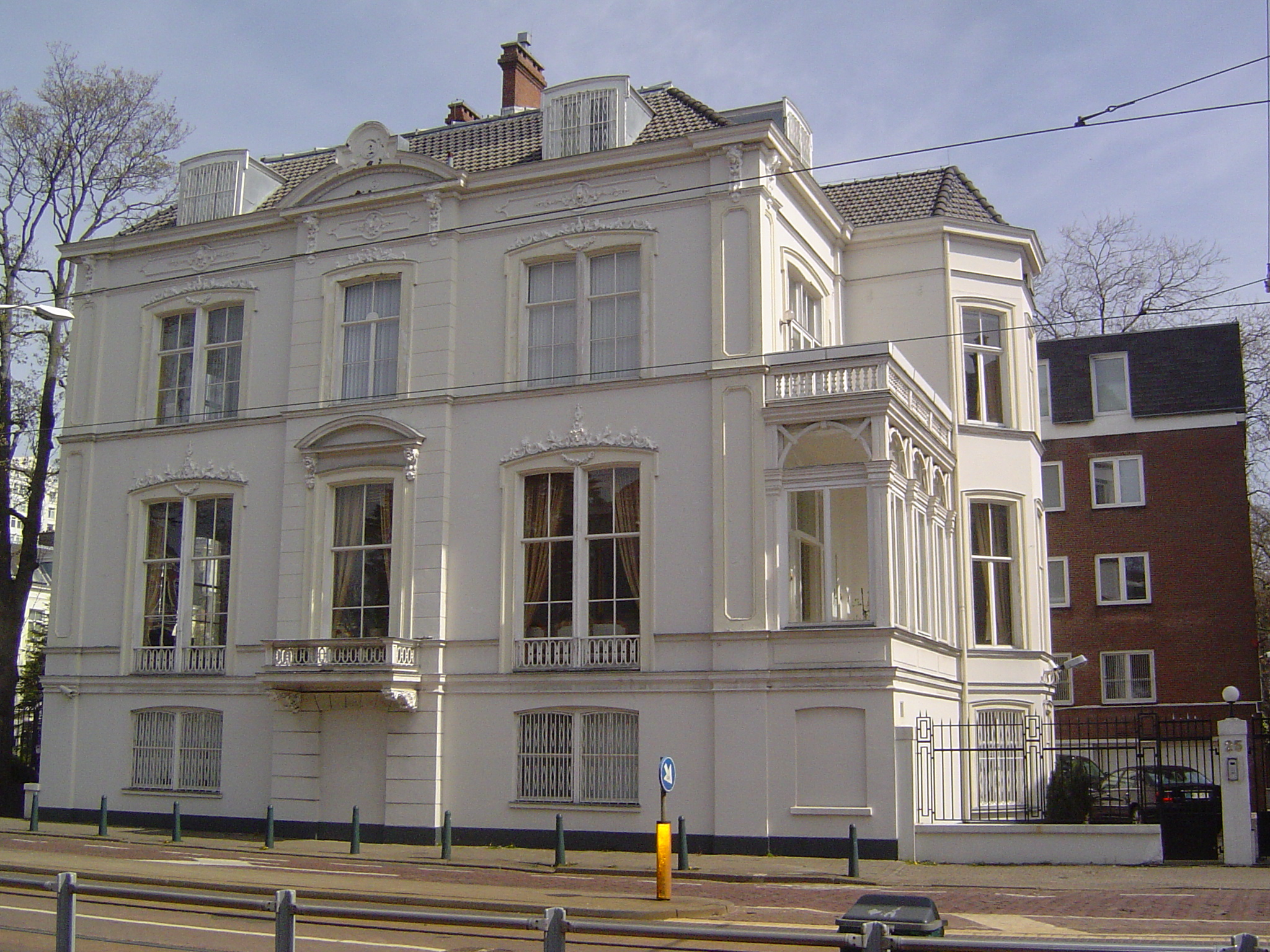
Embassy in The Hague

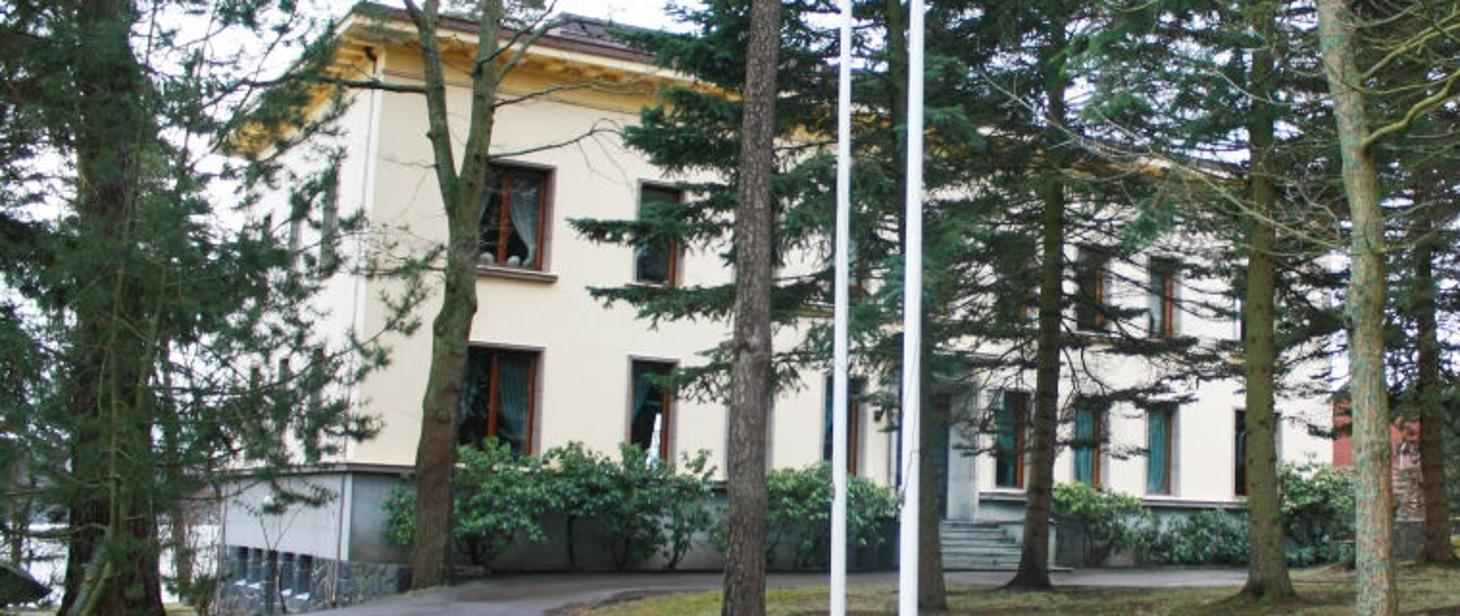
Embassy in Helsinki

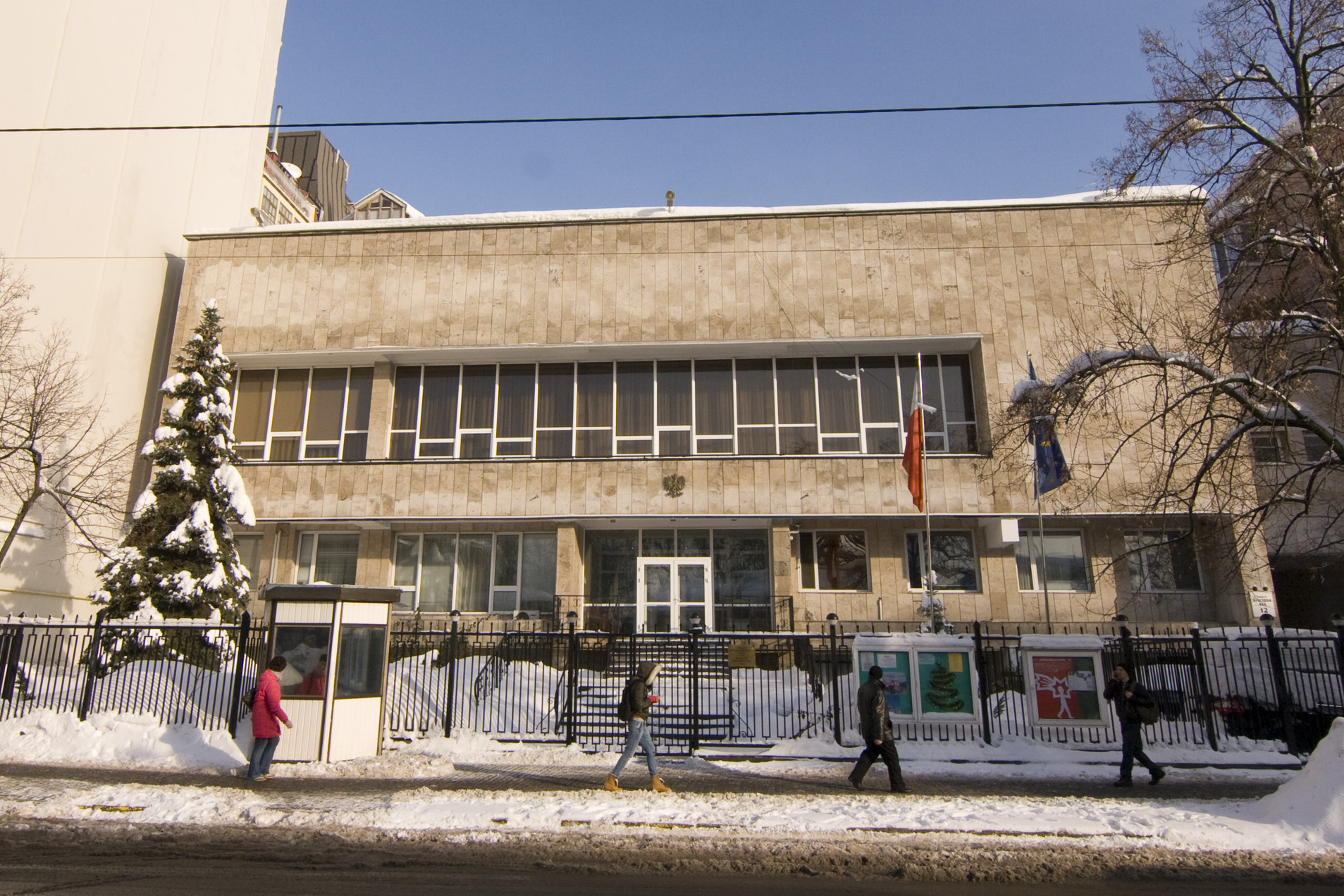
Embassy in Kyiv

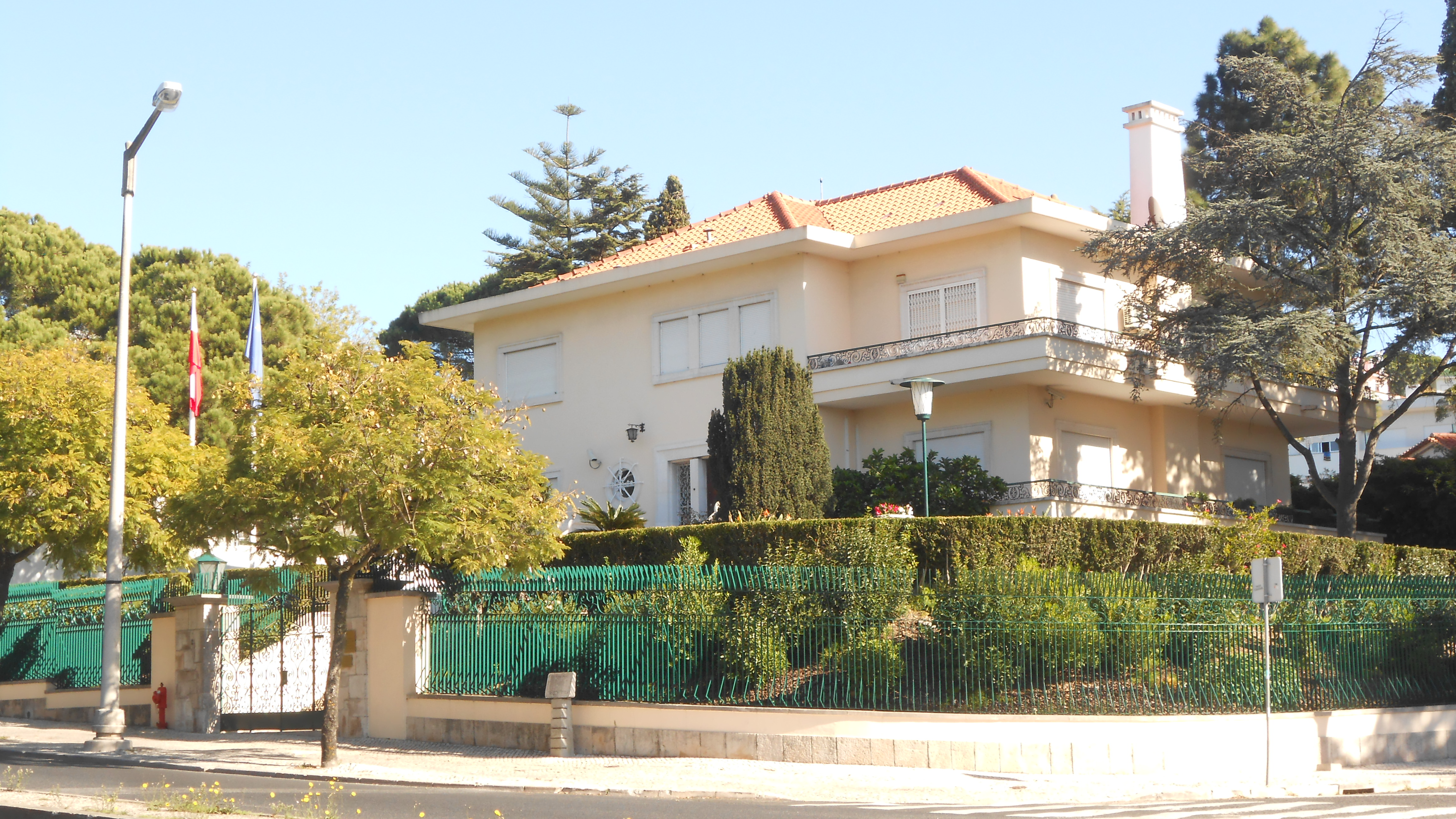
Embassy in Lisbon

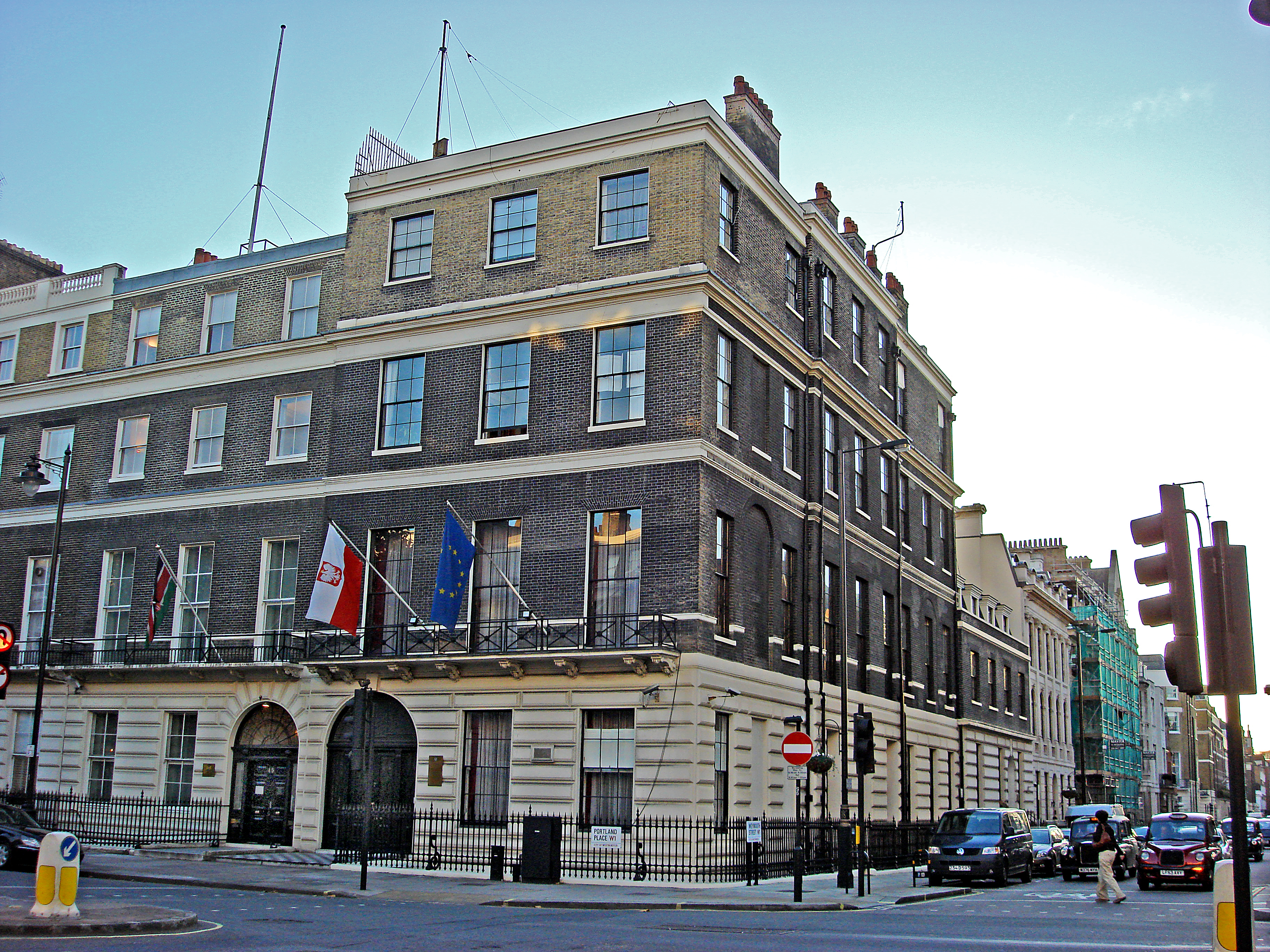
Embassy in London

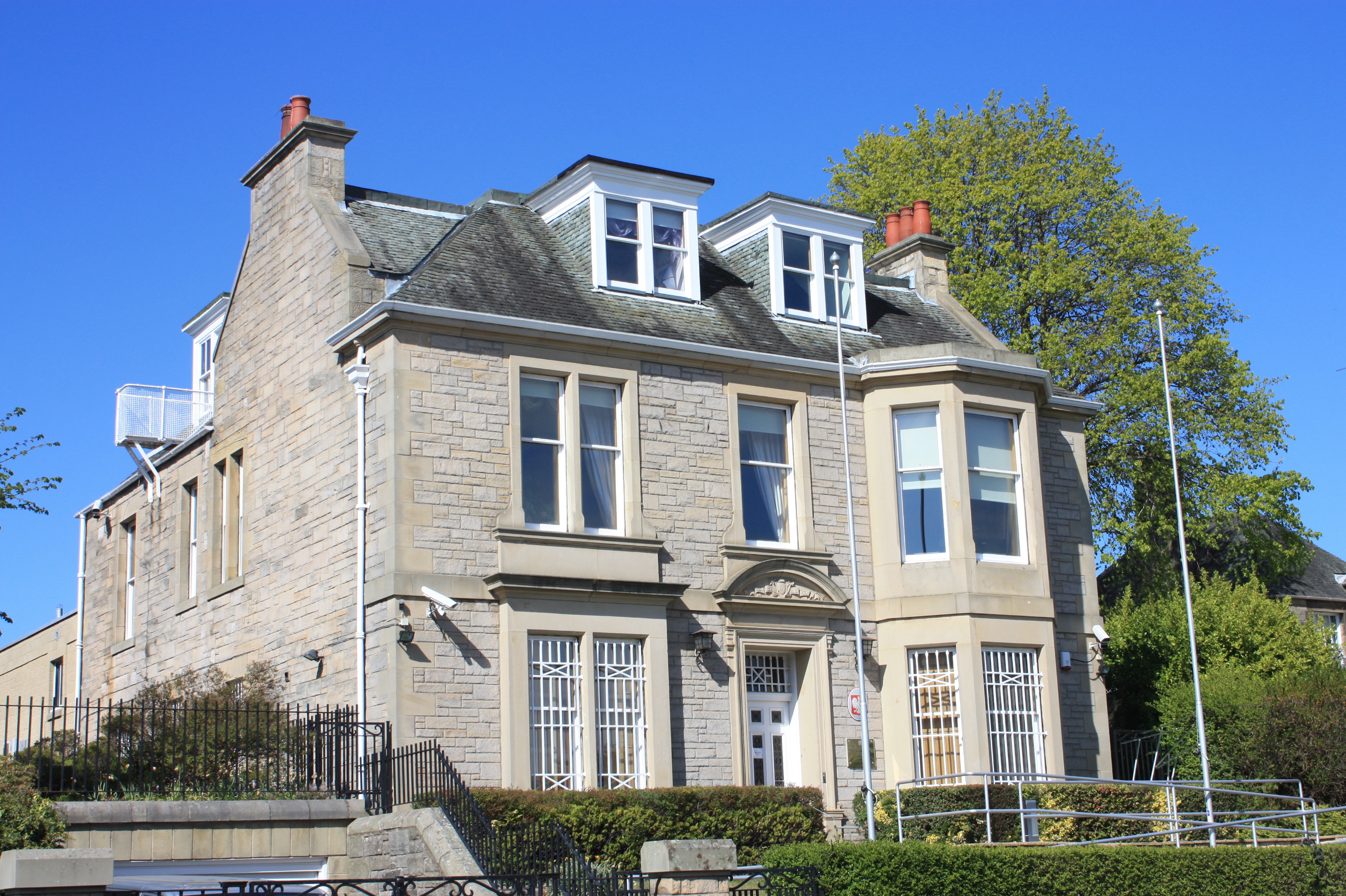
Consulate-General in Edinburgh

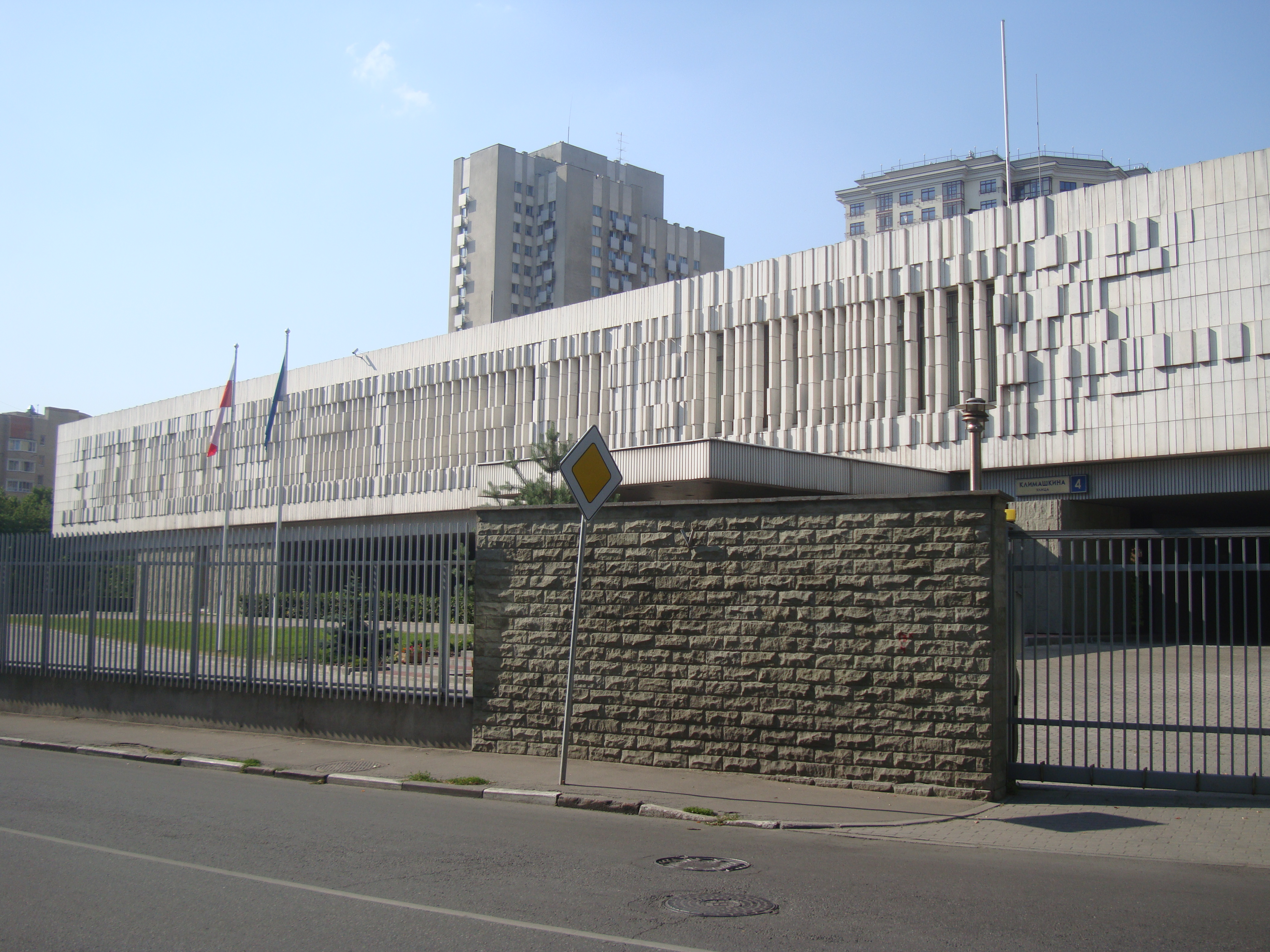
Embassy in Moscow

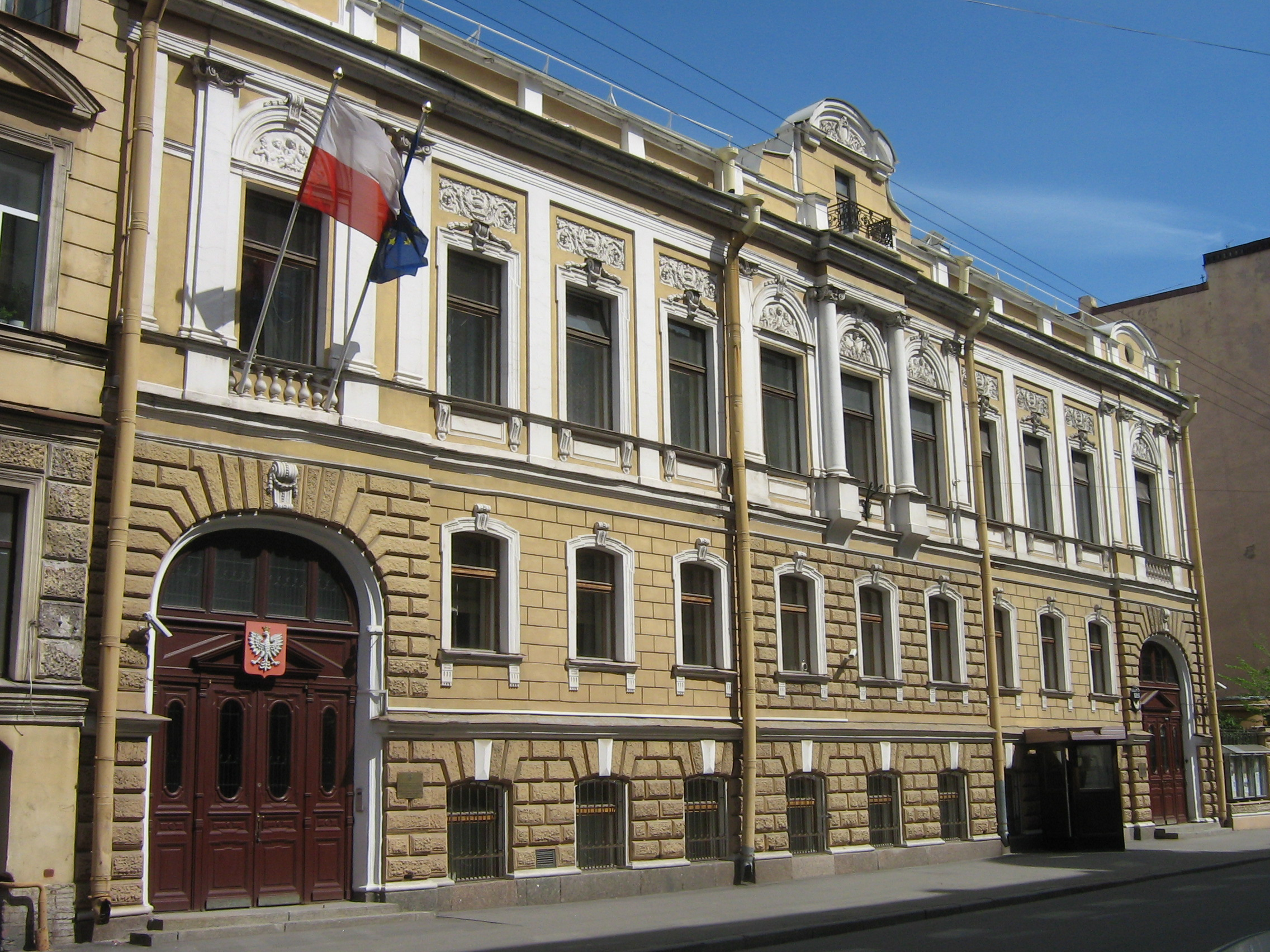
Consulate-General in Saint Petersburg

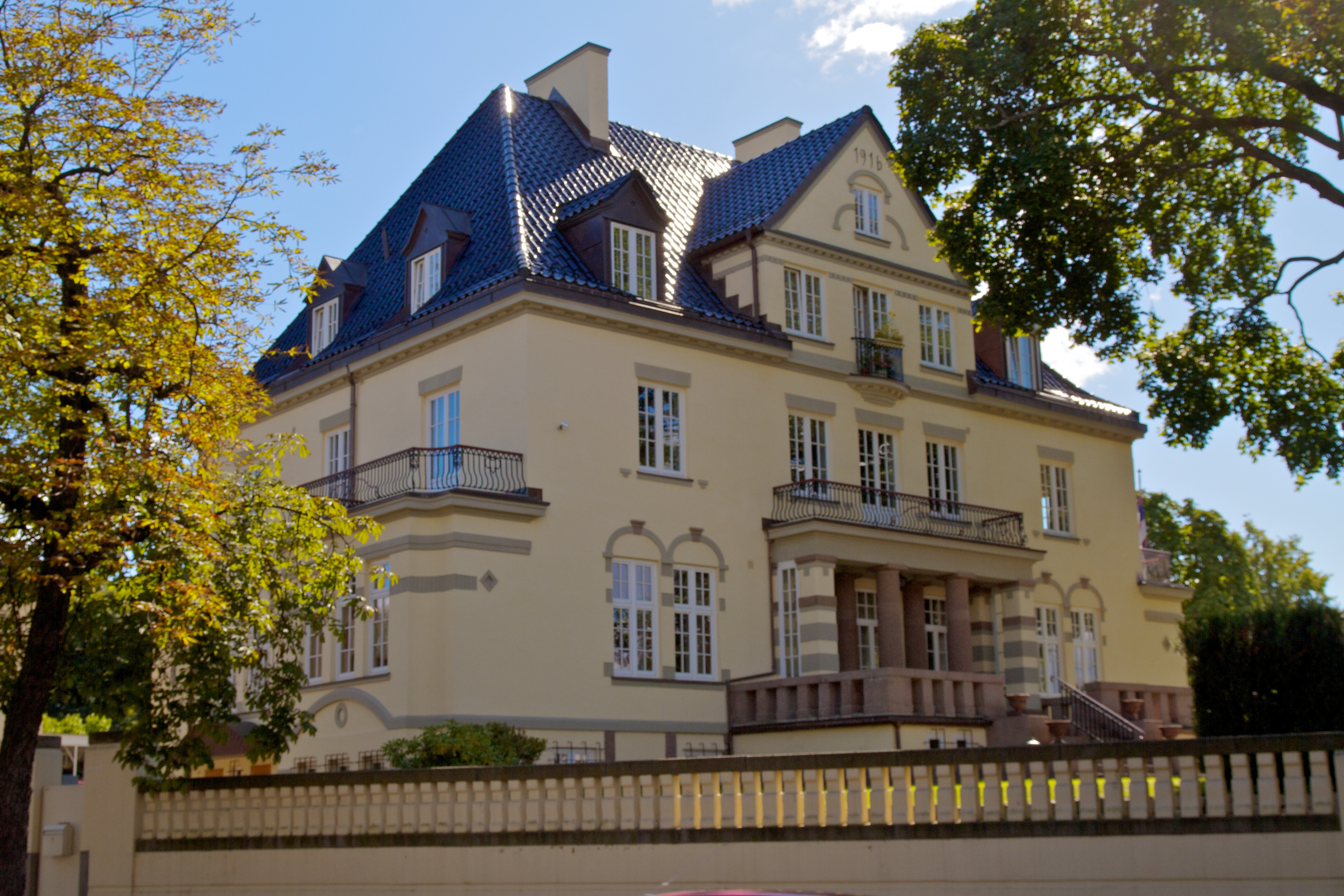
Embassy in Oslo

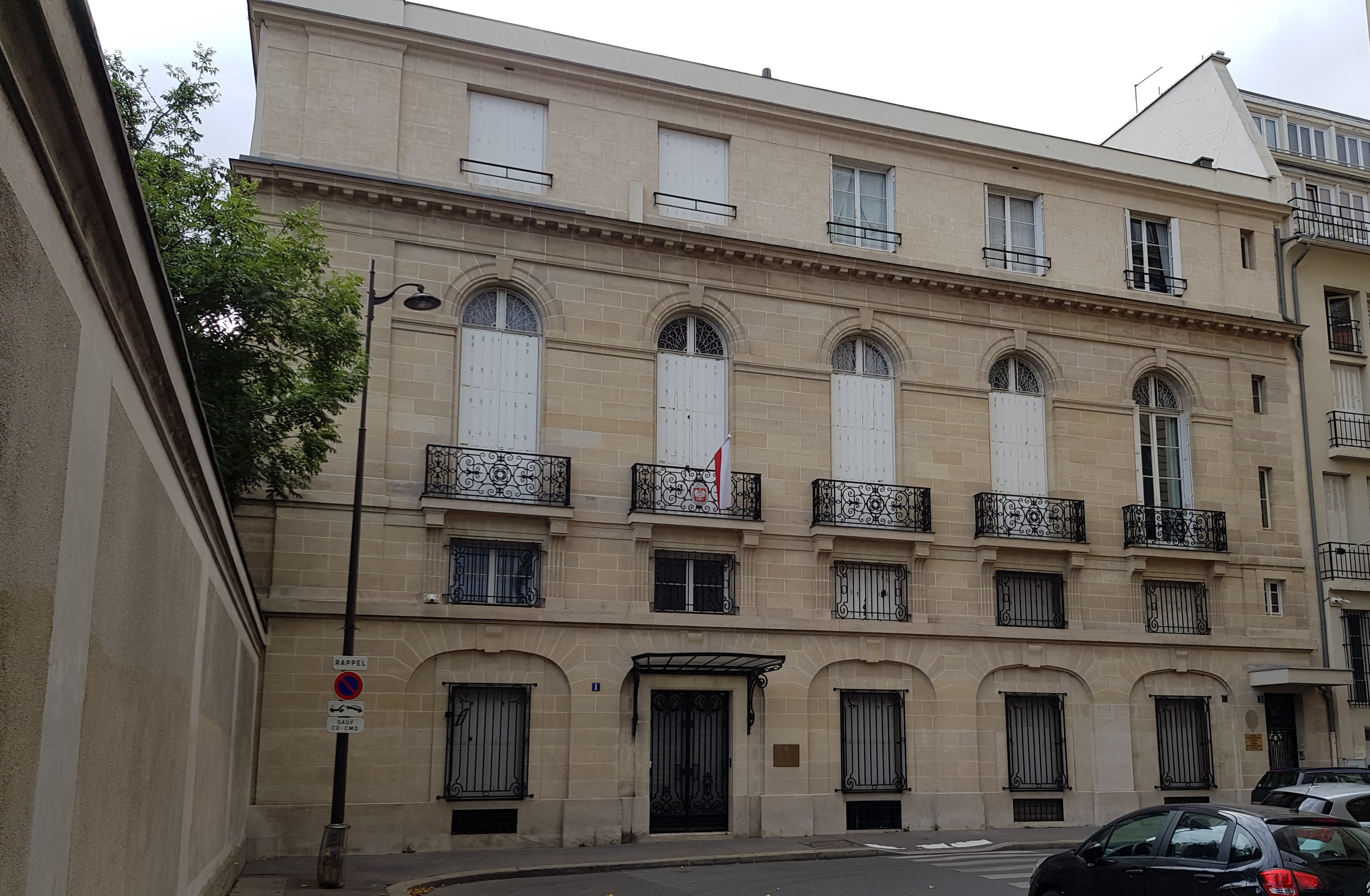
Embassy in Paris

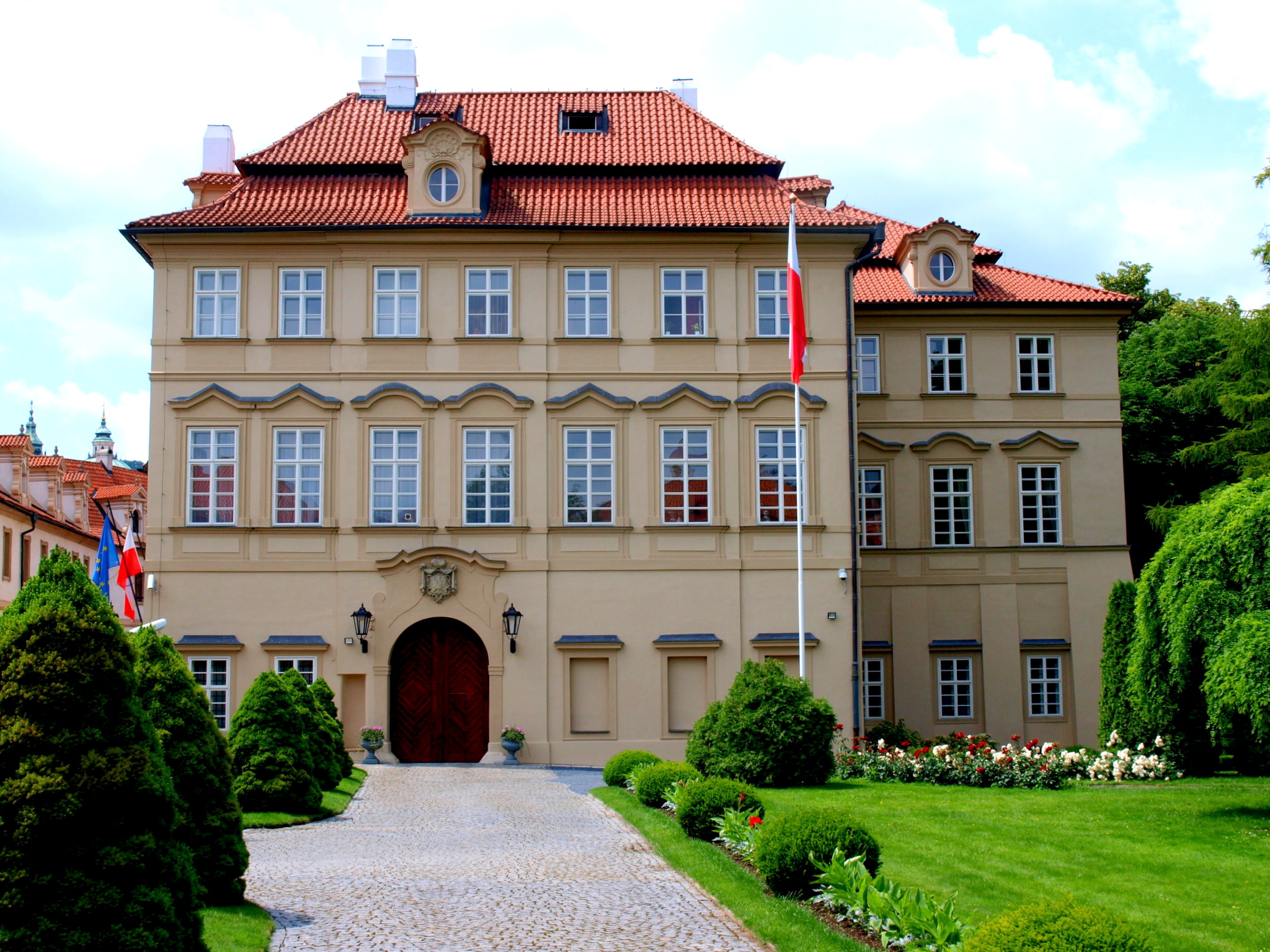
Embassy in Prague

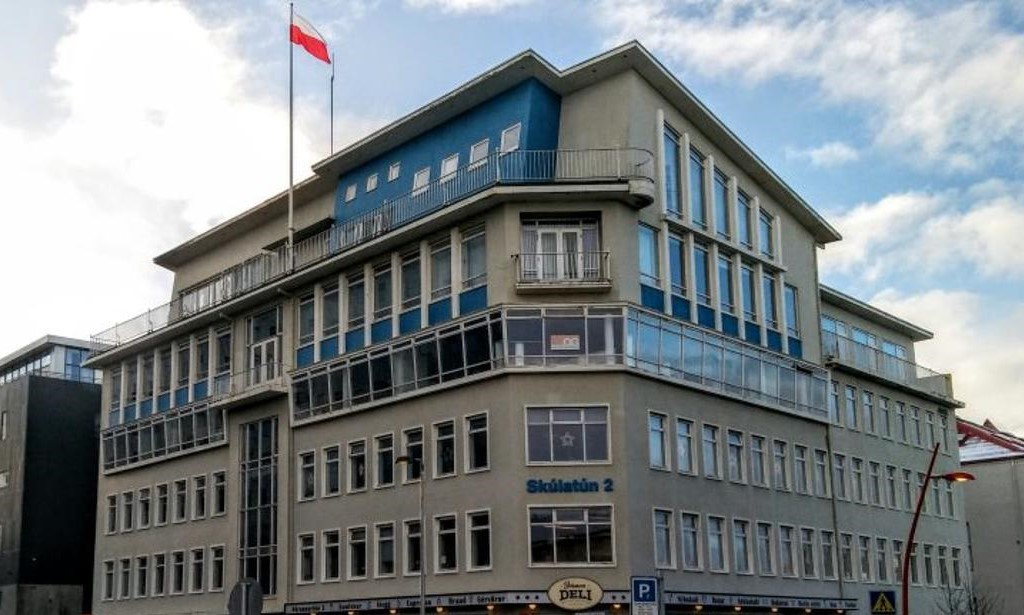
Embassy in Reykjavík

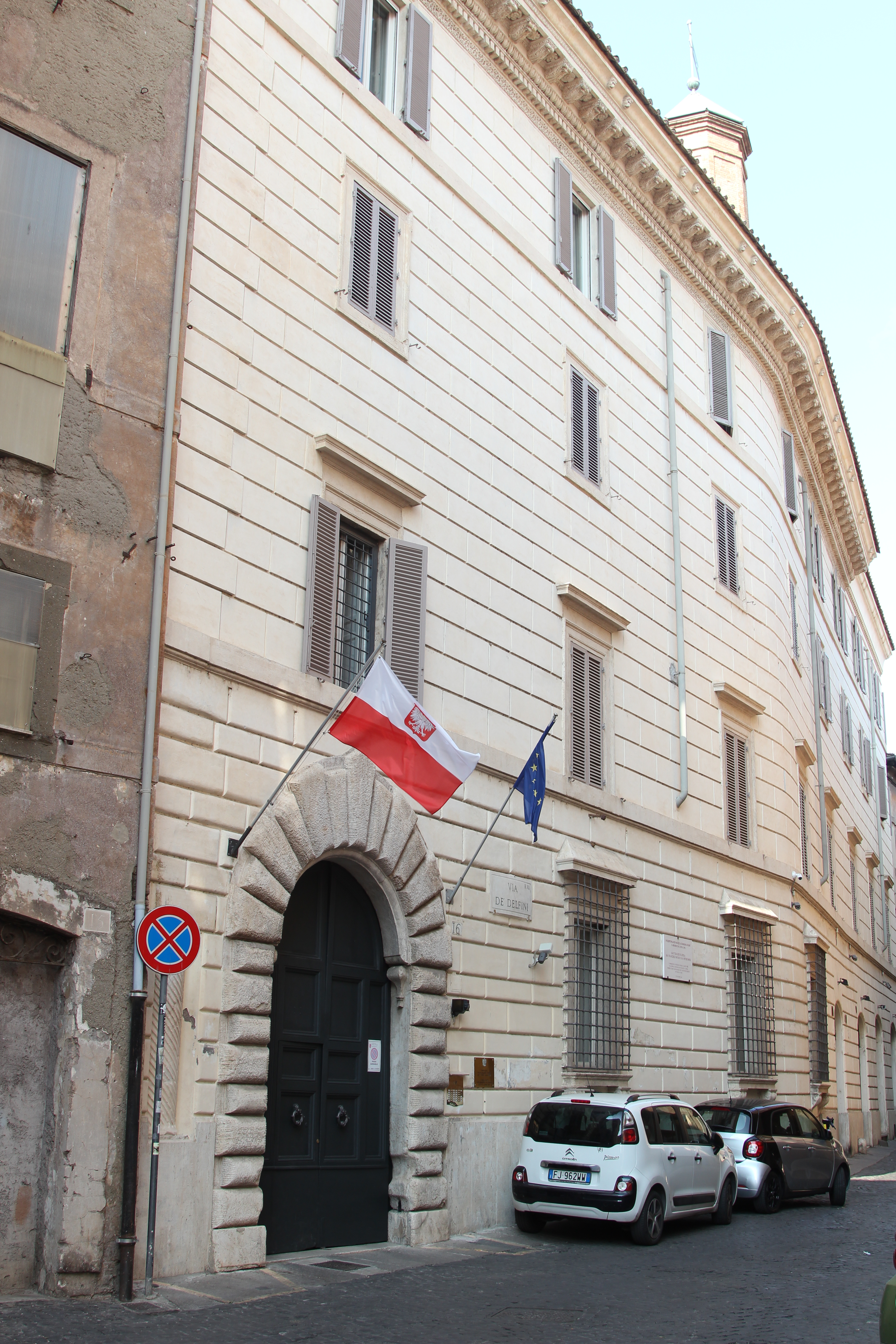
Embassy to the Holy See in Rome

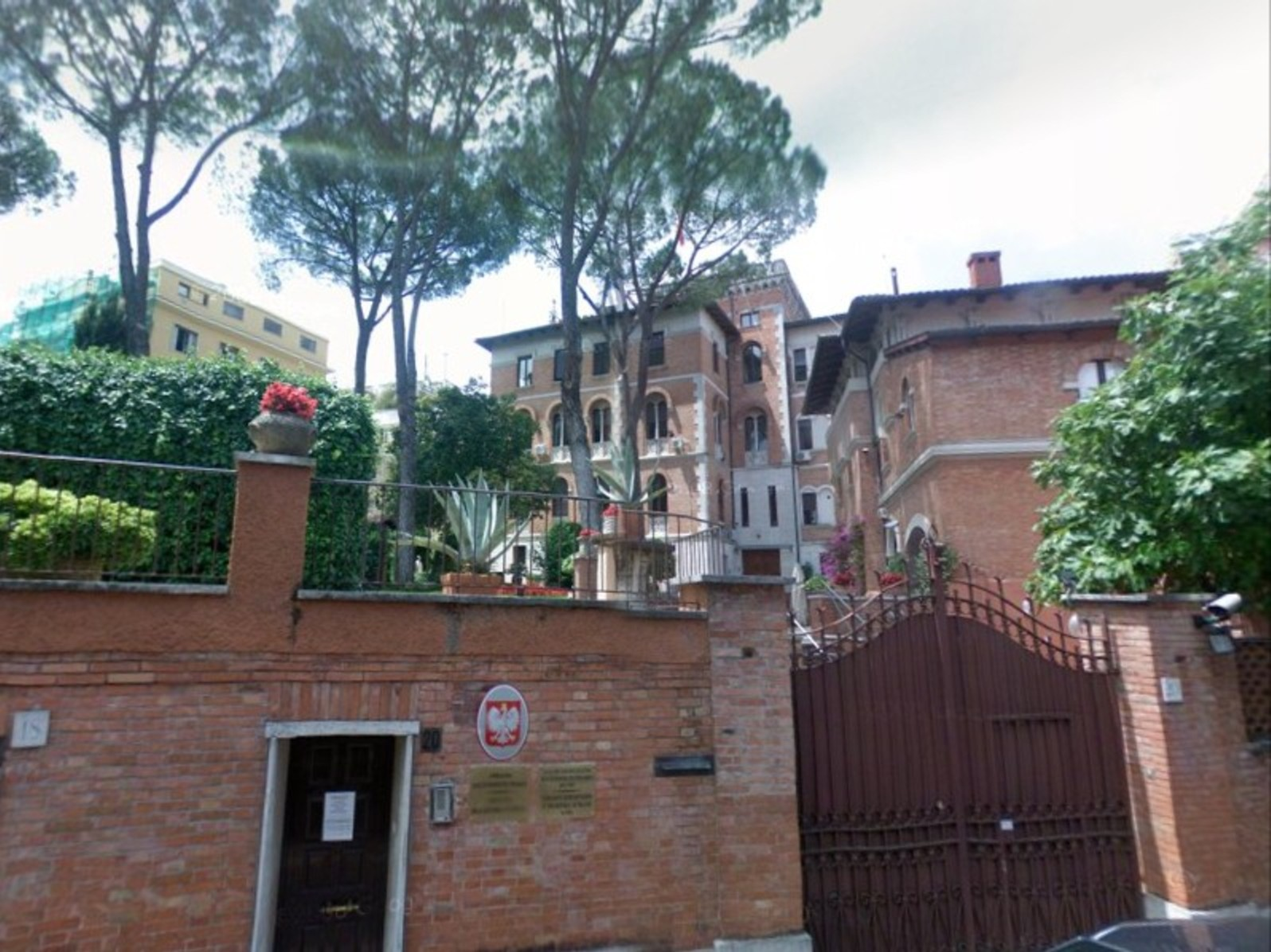
Embassy in Rome

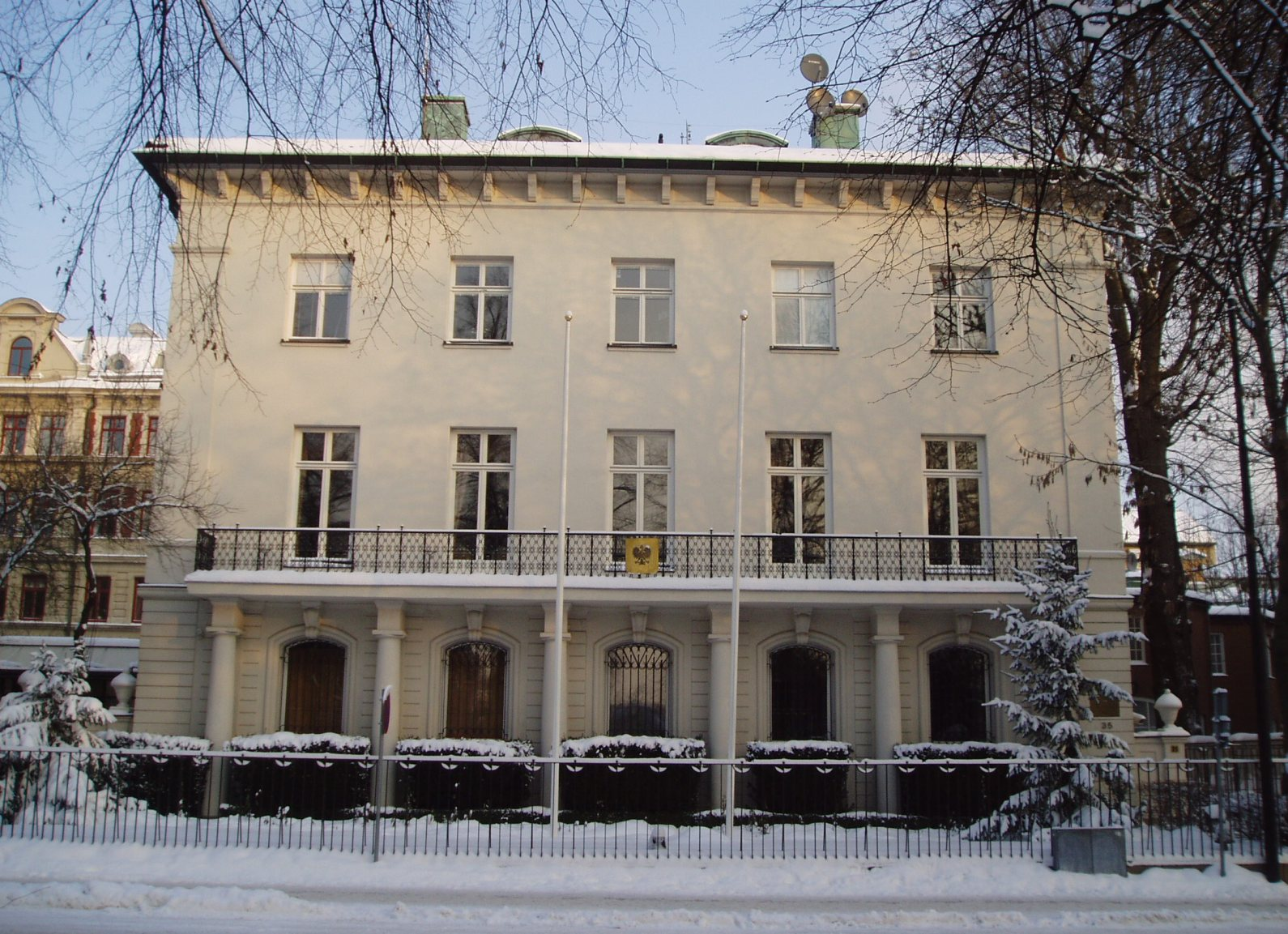
Embassy in Stockholm

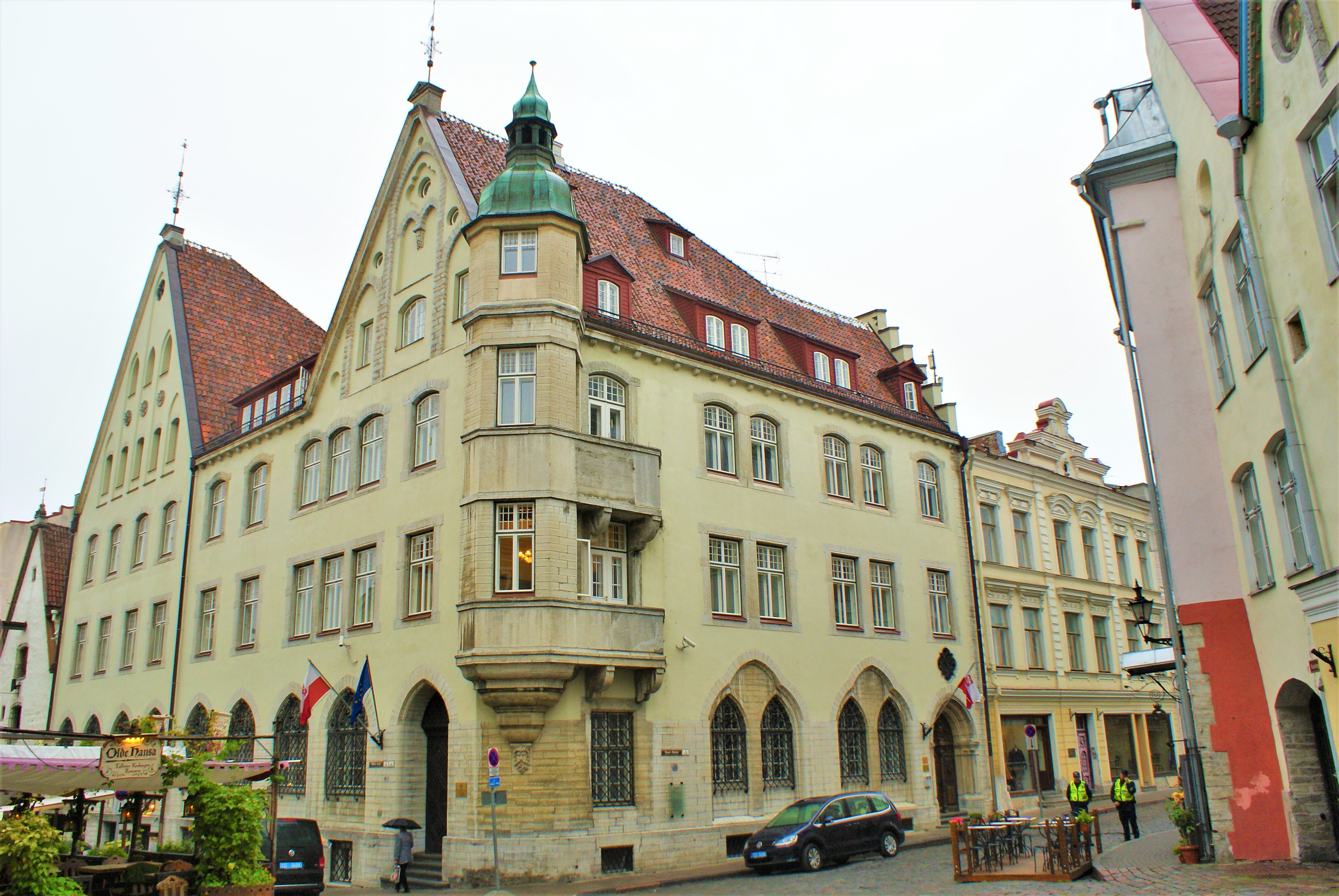
Embassy in Tallinn

Embassy in Tirana

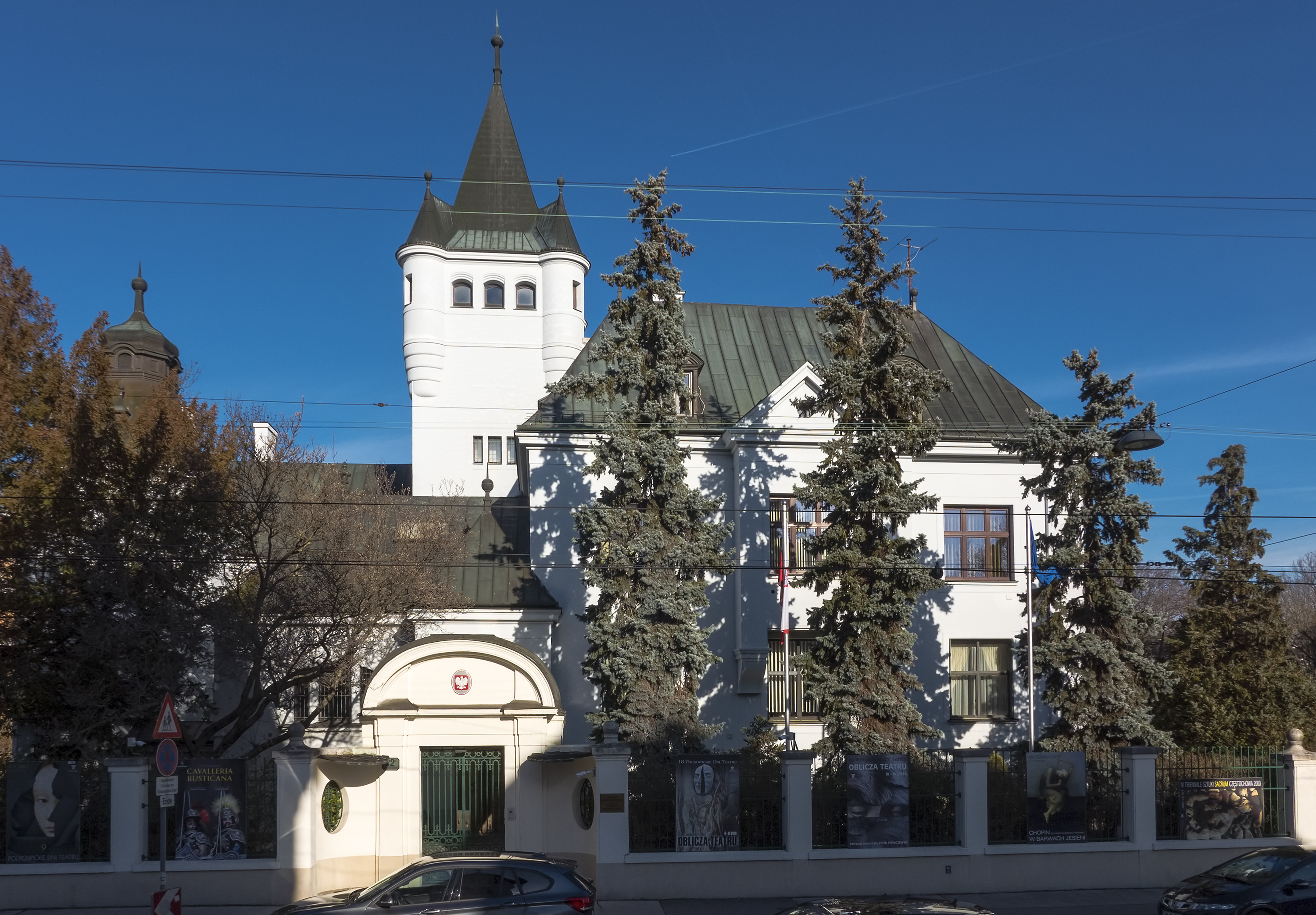
Embassy in Vienna

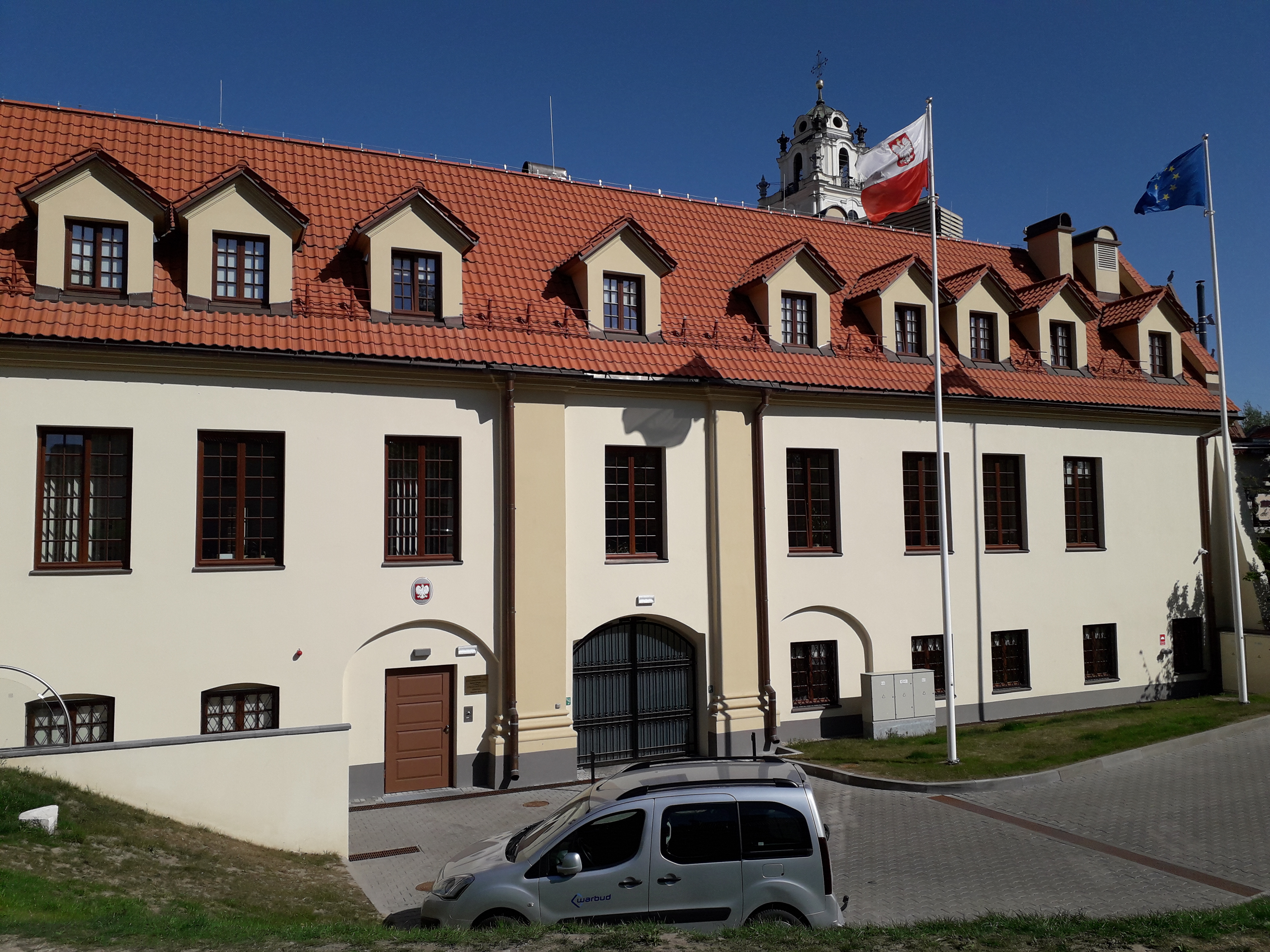
Embassy in Vilnius

=== Oceania ===
Host country	Host city	Mission	Concurrent accreditation	Ref.
Australia	Canberra	Embassy	Countries: Fiji; Marshall Islands; Micronesia; Papua New Guinea; Nauru; Solomon Islands; Vanuatu	
Australia	Sydney	Consulate-General	Countries: Fiji; Marshall Islands; Micronesia; Papua New Guinea; Nauru; Solomon Islands; Vanuatu	
New Zealand	Wellington	Embassy	Countries: Kiribati; Samoa; Tonga; Tuvalu	

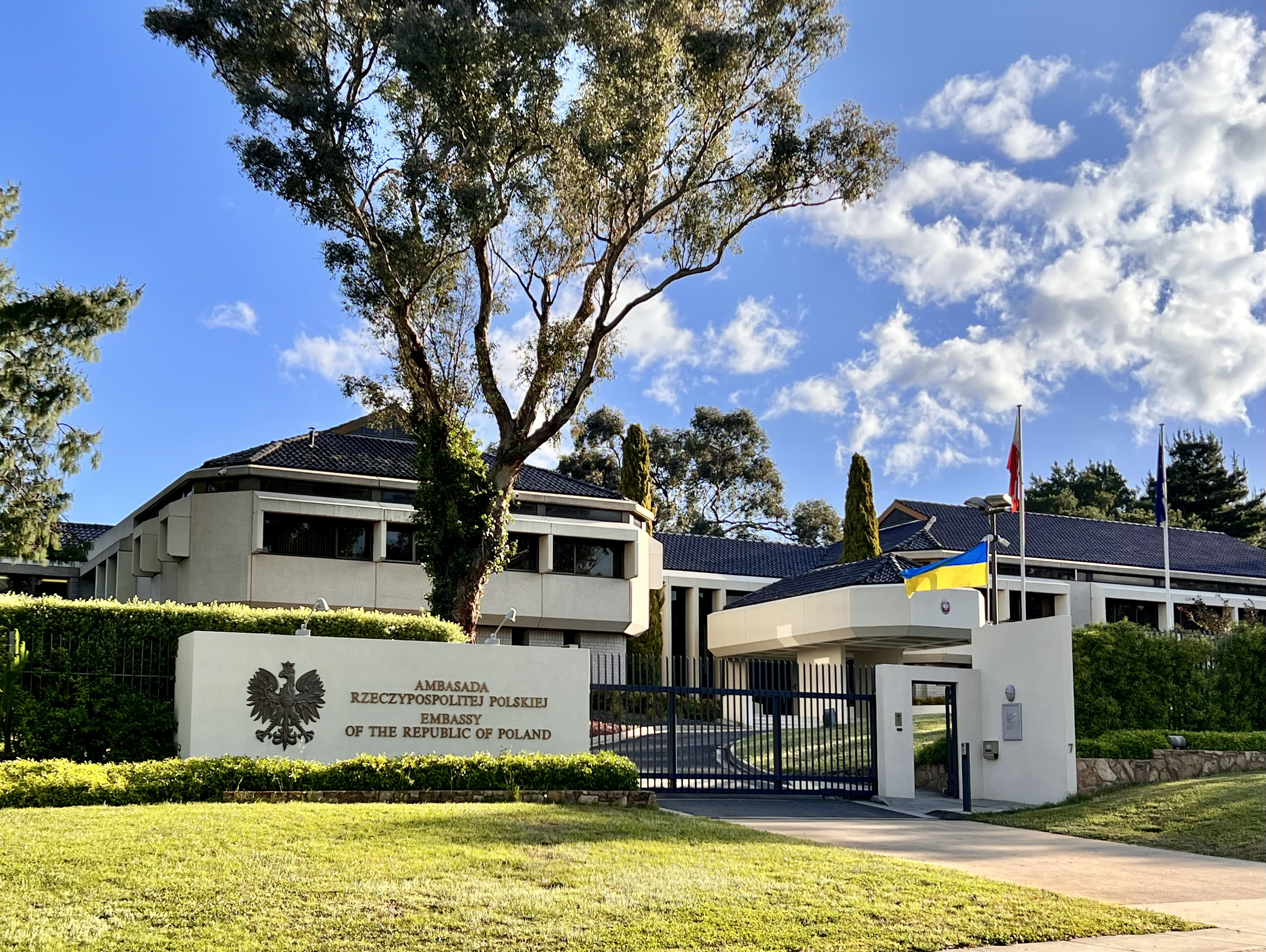
Embassy in Canberra

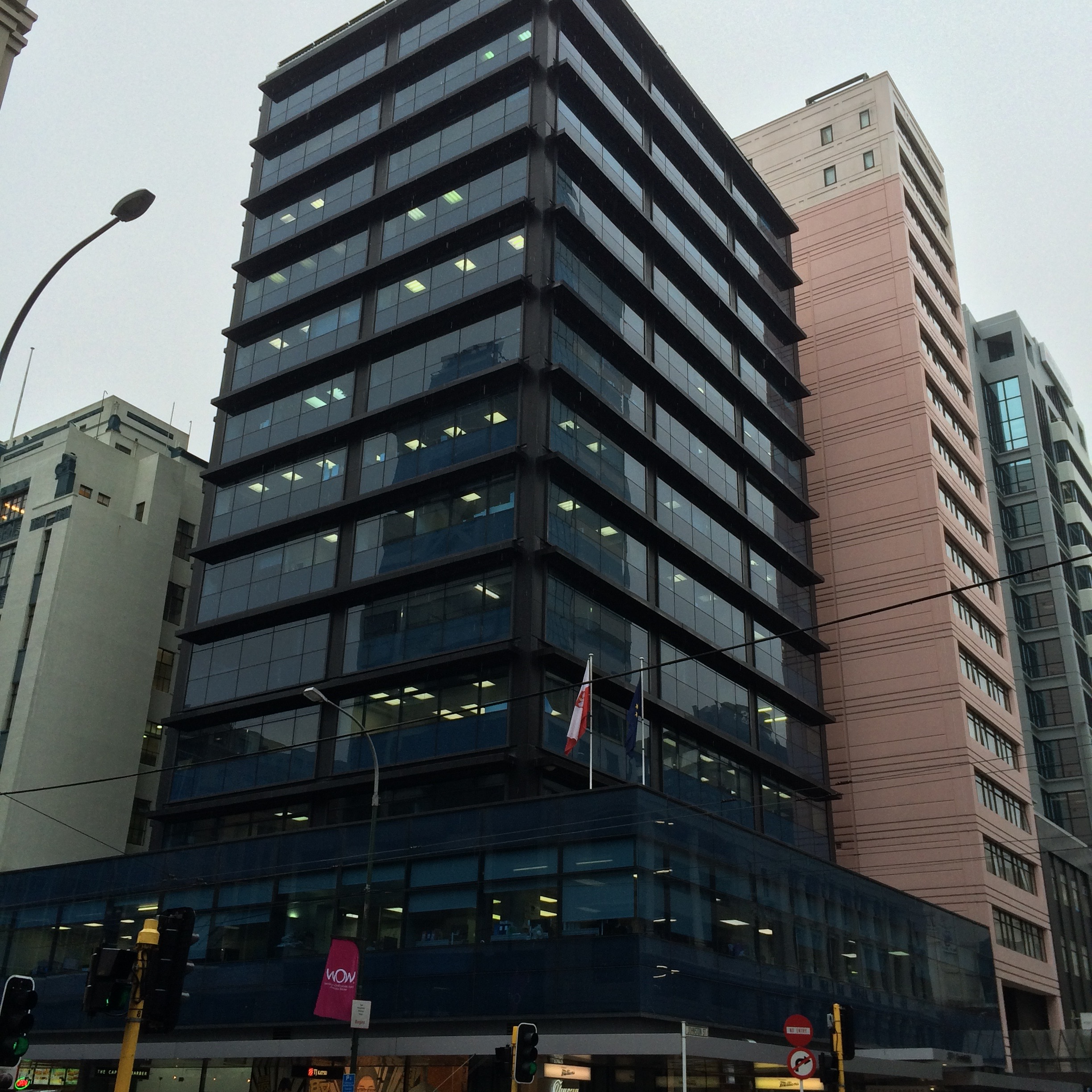
Building hosting the embassy in Wellington

=== Multilateral organizations ===
Organization	Host city	Host country	Mission	Concurrent accreditation	Ref.
Council of Europe	Strasbourg	France	Permanent Representation		
European Union	Brussels	Belgium	Permanent Representation		
Food and Agriculture Organization	Rome	Italy	Permanent Mission	International Organizations: International Fund for Agricultural Development; World Food Programme	
NATO	Brussels	Belgium	Permanent Delegation		
OECD	Paris	France	Permanent Representation		
OSCE	Vienna	Austria	Permanent Mission		
United Nations	New York City	United States	Permanent Mission		
United Nations	Geneva	Switzerland	Permanent Mission	International Organizations: Conference on Disarmament; World Health Organization; World Intellectual Property Organization; World Trade Organization	
United Nations	Nairobi	Kenya	Permanent Mission	International Organizations: United Nations Environment Programme; United Nations Human Settlements Programme	
United Nations	Vienna	Austria	Permanent Mission	International Organizations: International Atomic Energy Agency; UNIDO; UNODC; UNCITRAL	
UNESCO	Paris	France	Permanent Mission		

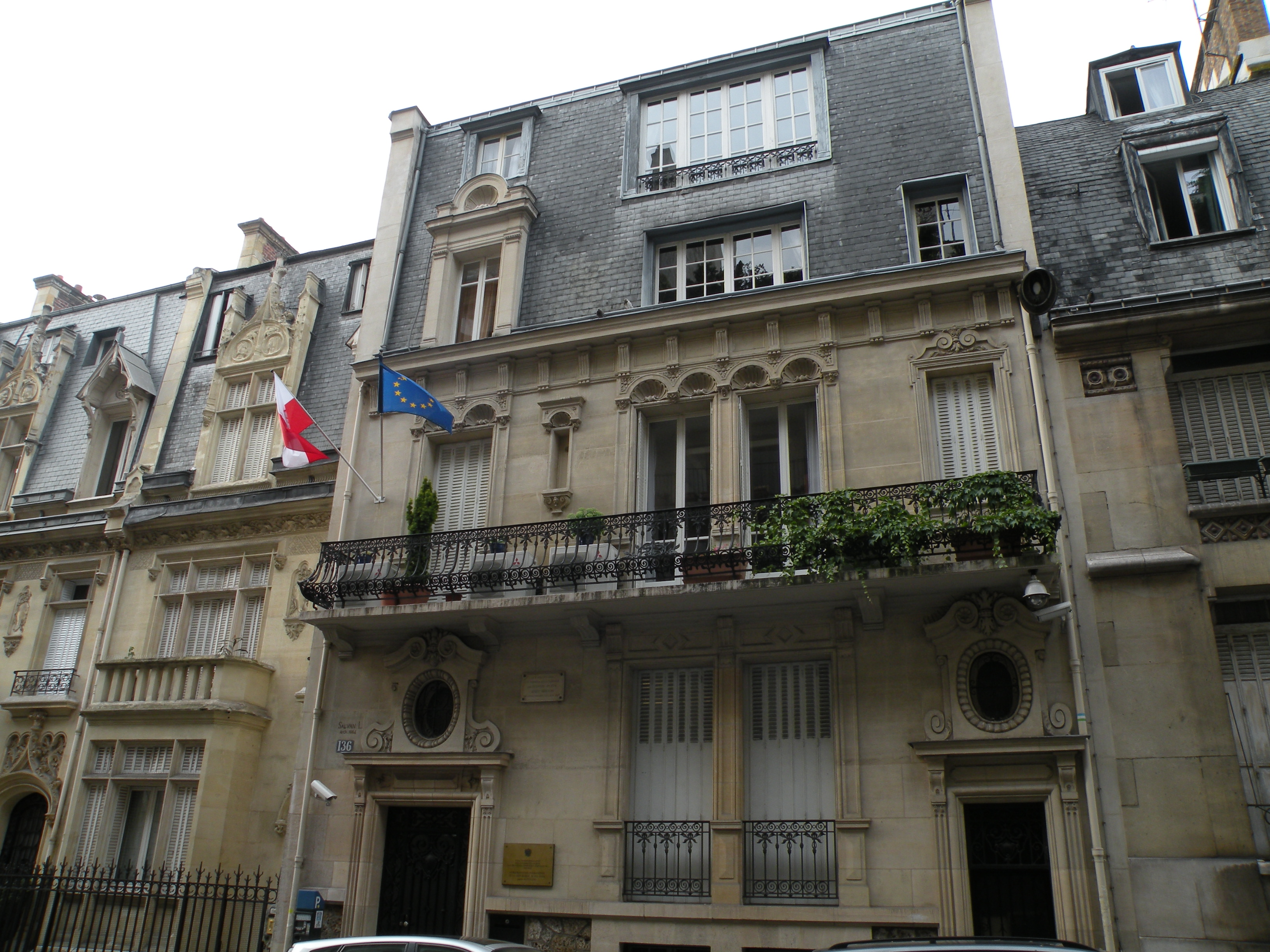
Permanent Mission to the OECD in Paris

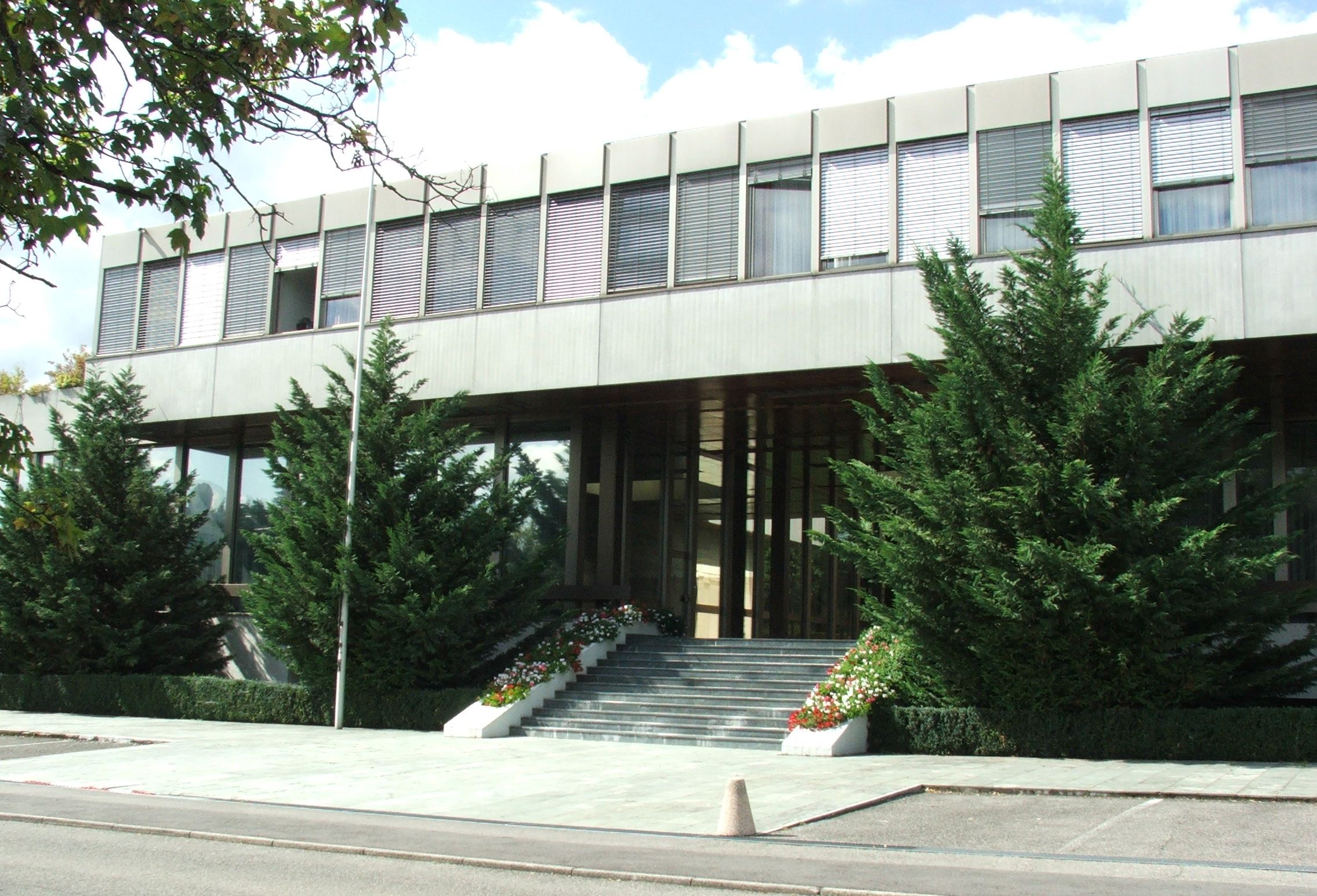
Permanent Mission to the UN in Geneva

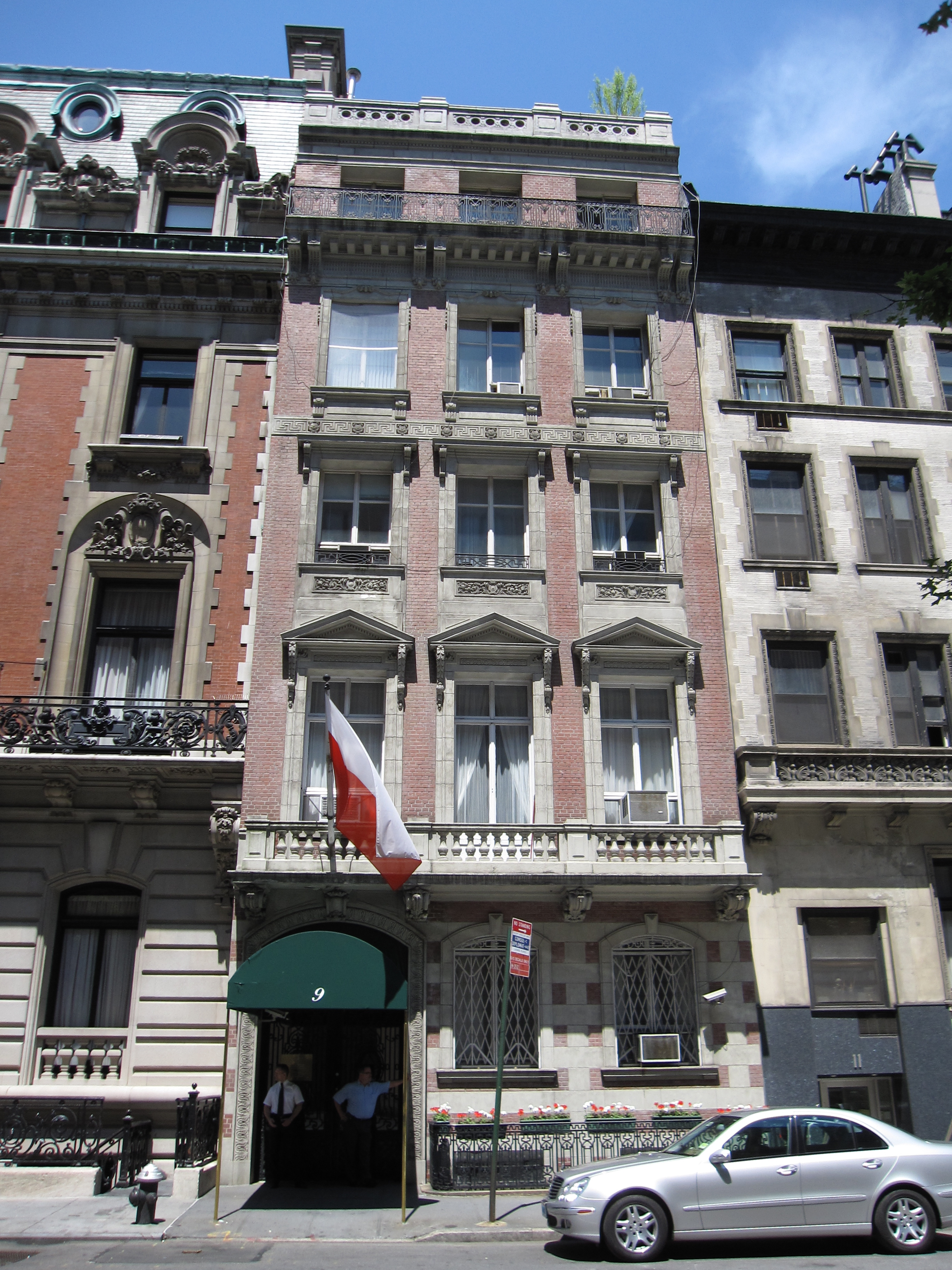
Permanent Mission to the UN in New York City

== Closed missions ==
=== Africa ===
Host country	Host city	Mission	Year closed	Ref.
Botswana	Gaborone	Embassy	1991	
Cameroon	Yaoundé	Embassy	1981	
Congo-Kinshasa	Kinshasa	Embassy	2008	
Ghana	Accra	Embassy	1993	
Guinea	Conakry	Embassy	1981	
Ivory Coast	Abidjan	Embassy	2003	
Liberia	Monrovia	Embassy	1990	
Libya	Tripoli	Embassy (Note: To be reopened)	2014	
Libyan Arab Jamahiriya	Benghazi	Consulate-General	2006	
Mali	Bamako	Embassy	1969	
Morocco	Casablanca	Consulate-General	2008	
Mozambique	Maputo	Embassy	1990	
Nigeria	Kano	Consulate	1988	
Nigeria	Lagos	Consulate-General	2008	
Zimbabwe	Harare	Embassy	2008	

=== Americas ===
Host country	Host city	Mission	Year closed	Ref.
Bolivia	La Paz	Embassy	1981	
Brazil	Rio de Janeiro	Consulate-General	2008	
Brazil	São Paulo	Consulate-General	2014	
Costa Rica	San José	Embassy	2008	
United States	Detroit	Consulate-General	1953	
United States	Pittsburgh	Consulate	1950	
Uruguay	Montevideo	Embassy	2008	

=== Asia ===
Host country	Host city	Mission	Year closed	Ref.
Afghanistan	Kabul	Embassy	2014	
Bangladesh	Dhaka	Embassy	2005	
Cambodia	Phnom Penh	Embassy	2008	
China	Chengdu	Consulate-General	2025	
India	Kolkata	Consulate General	1993	
Laos	Vientiane	Embassy	2008	
Myanmar	Yangon	Embassy	1990	
Kingdom of Nepal	Kathmandu	Embassy	1981	
Pakistan	Karachi	Consulate-General	2008	
Sri Lanka	Colombo	Embassy	1993	
Turkmenistan	Ashgabat	Embassy	2012	
Vietnam	Ho Chi Minh City	Consulate-General	2008	
Yemen	Sana'a	Embassy	2008	

=== Europe ===
Host country	Host city	Mission	Year closed	Ref.
Belgium	Antwerp	Consulate	2000	
Bulgaria	Varna	Consulate-General	2008	
France	Lille	Consulate-General	2013	
France	Nancy	Consulate	1963	
France	Strasbourg	Consulate-General	2008	
France	Toulouse	Consulate	1963	
Germany	Leipzig	Consulate-General	2008	
Italy	Catania	Consulate-General	2009	
Russia	Irkutsk	Consulate-General	2025	
Russia	Kaliningrad	Consulate-General	2025	
Russia	Saint Petersburg	Consulate-General	2025	
Russia	Smolensk	Consular agency	2023	
Switzerland	Zürich	Consulate-General	1980	
Sweden	Malmö	Consulate-General	2014	
Ukraine	Donetsk	Consulate-General	2015	
Ukraine	Sevastopol	Consulate-General	2014	
United Kingdom	Glasgow	Consulate-General	1985	
United Kingdom	Southampton	Consular agency	Unknown	

== Flags and plaques ==
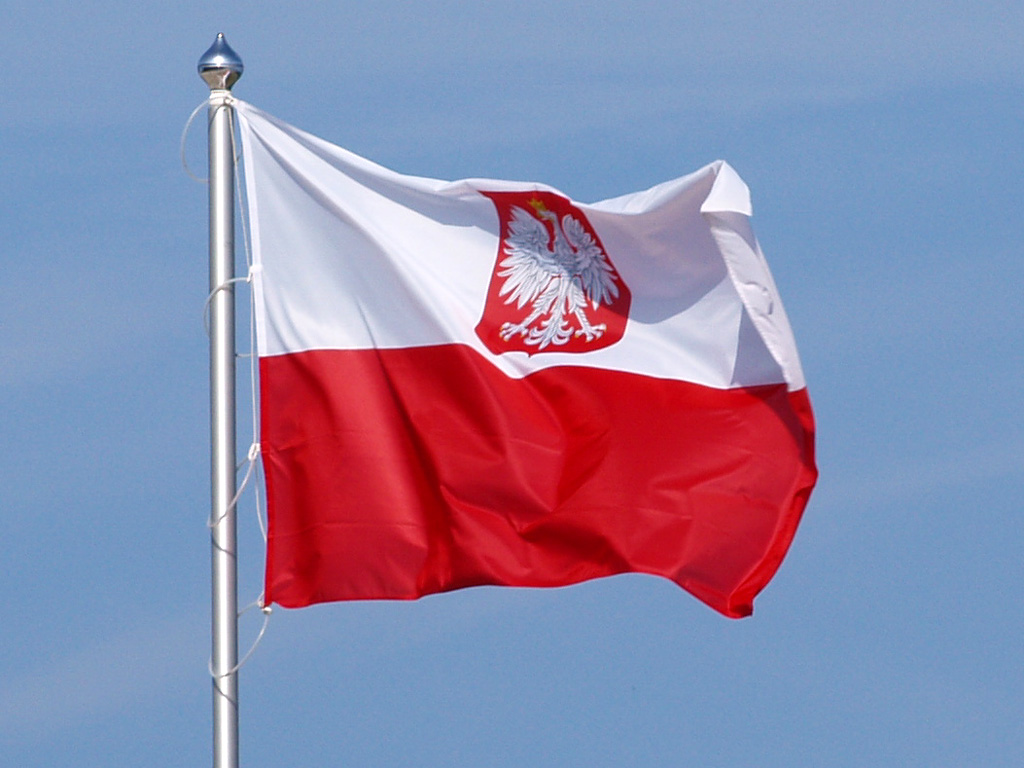
Flag used by Polish missions abroad.

Poland makes use of its state flag with coat of arms to designate Polish missions abroad. This flag is, according to legislation, to be used only by the Polish government and its associated agencies and diplomatic service. Additionally the flag is used as an ensign by Polish-registered ships on the high seas. Finally, the traditional governmental plaque is also affixed to all Polish missions abroad.

Item	Use	Description
	State flag used by Polish diplomatic missions	The Flag of Poland with the Coat of Arms of Poland
	Plaque affixed to Polish diplomatic missions	A silver-grey plaque with crimson and white border, upon which the Coat of Arms of Poland is fixed

== See also ==
- Foreign relations of Poland
