= Embassy of the Philippines, Moscow =

Diplomatic mission of the Philippines in Russia

Embassy of the Philippines, Moscow Pasuguan ng Pilipinas sa Mosku Посольство Филиппин в Москве

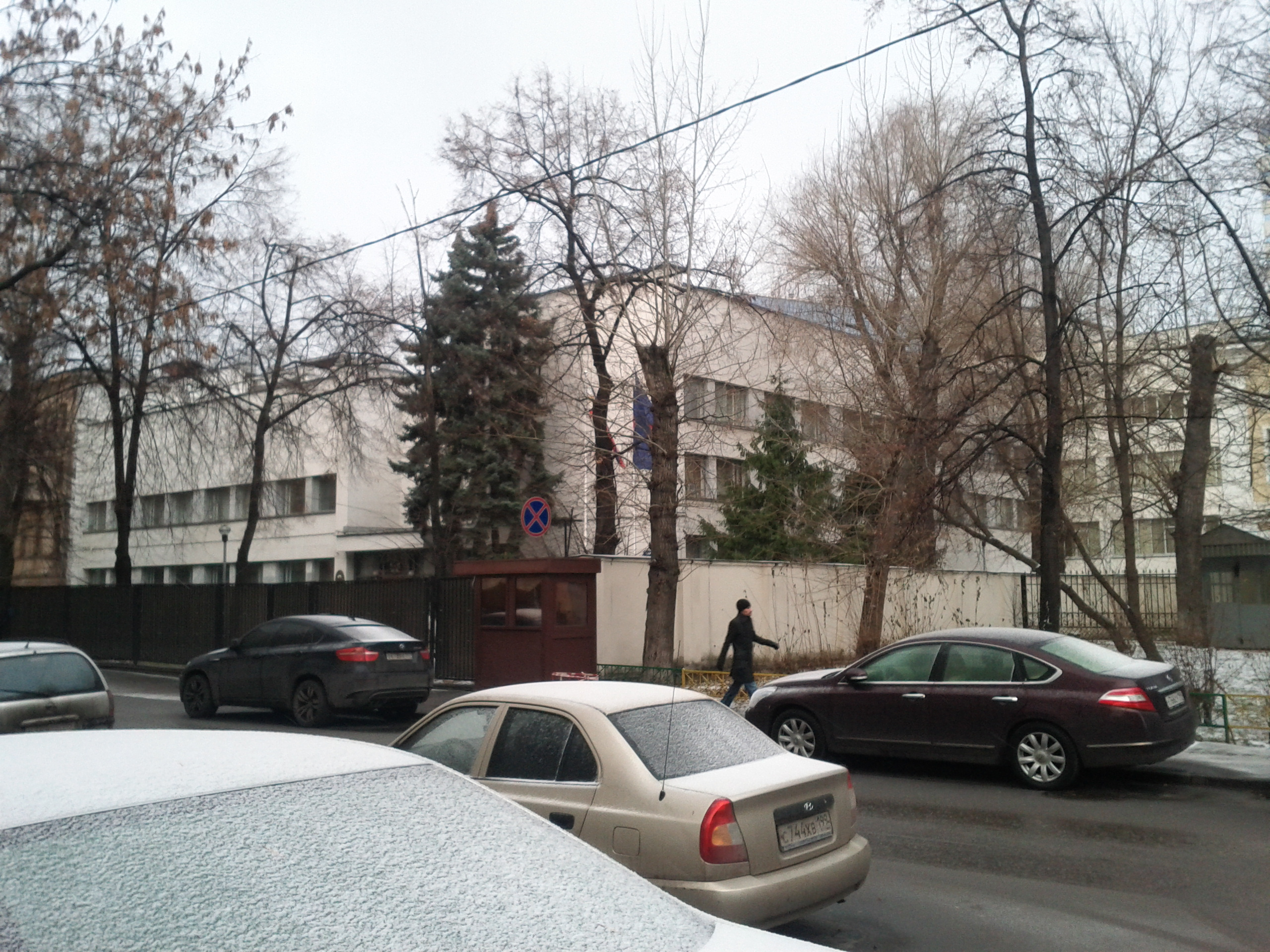
- Location: Moscow
- Address: 6/8 Karmanitskiy Lane
- Coordinates: 55°44′57.9″N 37°35′08.2″E
- Ambassador: Igor Garlit Bailen
- Jurisdiction: Armenia, Belarus, Kazakhstan, Russian Federation
- Website: http://moscowpe.dfa.gov.ph

The Embassy of the Philippines in Moscow is the diplomatic mission of the Republic of the Philippines to the Russian Federation. Occupied since 1978, it is located on 6/8 Karmanitskiy Lane (Russian: Карманицкий переулок, 6/8) in the Arbat District of central Moscow, a short walk from the headquarters of the Russian Ministry of Foreign Affairs, and near the former home of Alexander Pushkin on Arbat Street and the Spaso House, the official residence of the Ambassador of the United States to Russia.

== History ==
The Philippines did not immediately open a resident embassy when diplomatic relations between the Philippines and the then-Soviet Union were established in 1976. Its first diplomatic mission in Moscow was opened on August 2, 1977, when Juan A. Ona, appointed to serve as the first minister-counsellor to the Soviet Union, operating from Room 786 of the Hotel Ukraina (today the Radisson Royal Hotel, Moscow) on Kutuzovsky Prospekt. The Embassy continues to maintain its linkages to the hotel, as it billets its guests there.

Ona was later joined by two officers to help run the post, becoming the mission's erstwhile chargé d'affaires, and on September 30, 1977, Luis Moreno Salcedo arrived in Moscow as the first resident Philippine ambassador to the Soviet Union.

In late 1978, Soviet authorities permitted the Philippine embassy to relocate to its current premises, an L-shaped Khrushchev-era building that previously served as the embassy of South Vietnam. Today, the building houses both the mission's chancery and the ambassador's official residence.

Upon the dissolution of the Soviet Union in 1991, the Philippine Embassy in Moscow subsequently was accredited to Russia and eleven former Soviet republics, with jurisdiction over Estonia, Latvia, and Lithuania being transferred to the Philippine Embassy in Stockholm, and jurisdiction over Moldova being transferred to the Philippine Embassy in Bucharest. Currently the embassy has jurisdiction over Russia, Armenia, Belarus, and Kazakhstan, with the other former Soviet republics under its jurisdiction being transferred to other missions.

== Ambassadors ==
- Igor G. Bailen, 2022–Present
- Carlos D. Sorreta, 2015 - 2021
- Alejandro B. Mosquera, 2012 – 2014
- Victor G. Garcia III, 2008–2012
- Ernesto V. Llamas, 2003–2008
- Jaime S. Bautista, 1996–2003
- Samuel T. Ramel, 1995–1996
- Romualdo A. Ong, 1993–1994
- Juan V. Saez, 1989–1991
- Alejandro Melchor Jr., 1986–1989
- Luis Moreno-Salcedo, 1977-1982

== See also ==
- Philippines–Russia relations
- Philippines–Soviet Union relations
- List of diplomatic missions of the Philippines
