= Philippines–Russia relations =

- Philippines: Russia

Diplomatic mission
- Philippines Embassy, Moscow: Russia Embassy, Manila

Envoy
- Ambassador Igor Bailen: Ambassador Marat Pavlov

Philippines–Russia relations (Russian: Российско-филиппинские отношения, romanized: Filippino-rossiyskiye otnosheniya; Filipino: Ugnayang Pilipinas at Rusya) are the bilateral relations between the Russian Federation and the Republic of the Philippines. Both countries are full members of APEC and the United Nations.

Russia has an embassy in Manila and an honorary consulate in Cebu (handling Cebu, Aklan and Bohol), while the Philippines has an embassy in Moscow, and two honorary consulates (in Saint Petersburg and Vladivostok).

== History ==
=== Early history ===
Russia had been interested in developing ties with states in Southeast Asia as early as the 19th century. The Russian Empire's interest in establishing relations with Southeast Asian countries stemmed from its need to ensure food and raw supply security in the Russian Far East as communication between the far eastern part of Russia and its European side was significantly difficult.

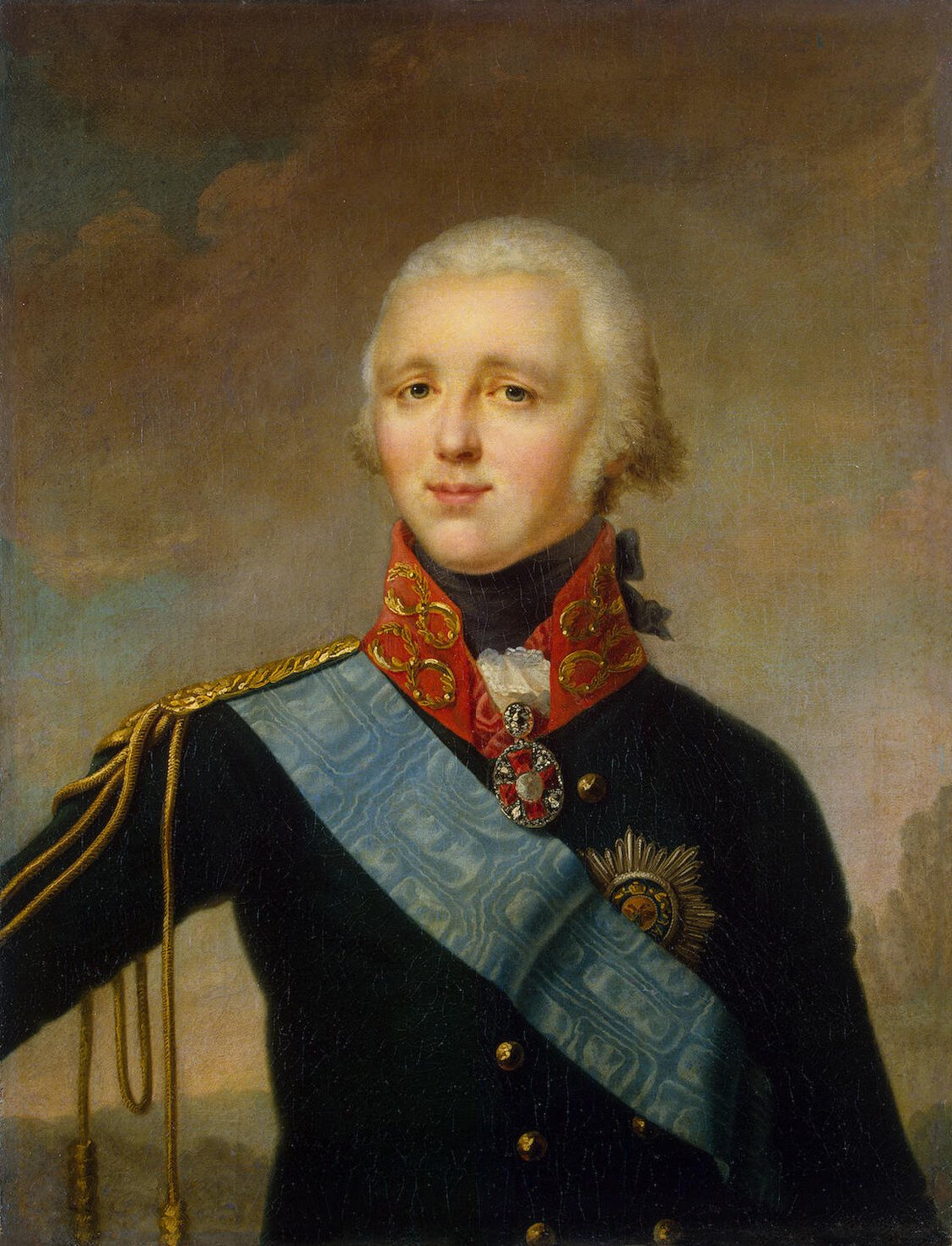
Under Russian Emperor Alexander I, Russia's first diplomatic mission in Southeast Asia, specifically in Manila, was established

A strategy to "explore the Far East via India and the Philippines to establish trade links" was suggested to Peter the Great by the Siberia Governor Fydor I. Semyonov in 1722.

In 1813, Russian Emperor Alexander I supported a plan created by Peter Dobell on trade and development with Southeast Asian states. Dobell was an Irish-born American businessman who resided in Southeast Asia. He was the first to initiate the promotion of relations with the Russian Far East, particularly the Kamchatka peninsula region. Russia finally decided to establish its first diplomatic mission in Southeast Asia in 1817 - a Consulate General in Manila. Peter Dobell became a naturalized citizen and took the name Petr Vasilievich Dobel and was appointed as the Consul General in the Philippines.

During this same year Captain Vasily Golovnin visited the Philippines aboard the Kamchatka. He was joined by the painter Mikhail Tikhanov, who produced several sketches of the Philippines for Russian audiences at home.

Establishing a formal Russian diplomatic mission was not easy as hoped because Spain's colonial government refused to recognize the Russian mission in Manila. However, a compromise was reached with Petr Valsilievich Dobel being allowed to stay and act in Manila as an unofficial representative of Russia in the Philippines.

The Consulate General began operations at the end of the 19th century, but it was not run by the Russians but rather by mostly French merchants also known as "freelance consuls". This type of Consulate operations continued until 1917.

=== Cold War era ===
The Soviet Union rose to power and replaced the Russian Empire after the October Revolution and the Russian Civil War and contacts between Soviet Russia and the Philippines were maintained through Comintern, Profintern and the Communist Party of the United States (since the Philippines was then a colony of the United States). Due to the restrictive policy of the American colonial administration of the Philippines against Communists, the relations between the Philippines and the Soviet Union gradually waned.

The diplomatic ties of the Philippines and the Soviet Union was reinitiated by President Ferdinand Marcos' Executive Secretary Alejandro Melchor Jr. and his then-aide-de-camp Major Jose T. Almonte through the help of Professor Ajit Singh Rye of the Institute of Asian Studies in the University of the Philippines.

It was through Professor Rye that Secretary Melchor and Major Almonte were able to pave way for an endorsement to Indira Gandhi for a dialogue with Moscow. At the time, the Philippines had been considered the United States' strongest ally in Southeast Asia and a reliable partner during the Cold War. However, the Marcos administration believed that the United States was going to lose the Vietnam War, and thus saw the need to establish ties with the "enemy."

With one visit to New Delhi in 1975, Major Almonte met with the Soviet Ambassador, which then led to a flight by Secretary Melchor and Major Almonte to the Kremlin where they were received as state guests. This meeting led to the creation of formal ties between the Philippines and the USSR in 1976.

In 1980, President Ferdinand Marcos with his wife Imelda Marcos met Yuri Andropov's Acting Chairman of the Presidium of the Soviet Union Vasily Kuznetsov during a conference meeting in Moscow.

=== After Soviet collapse ===
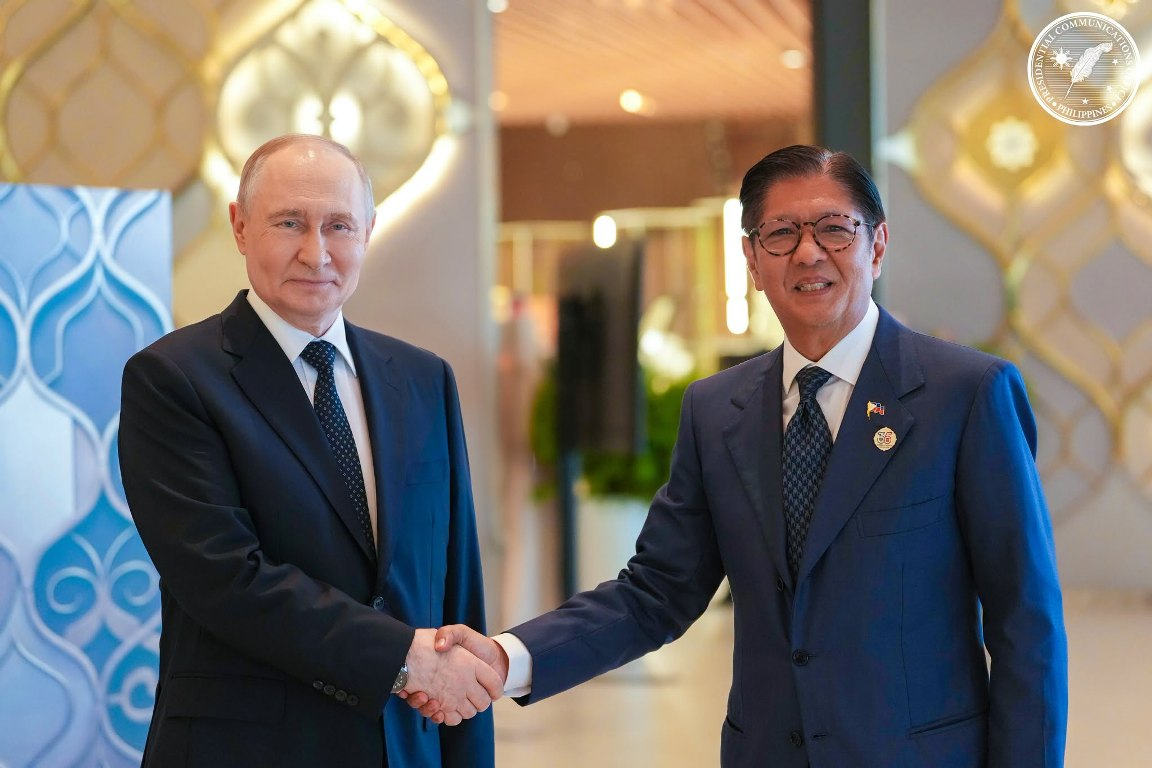
Russian president Vladimir Putin and Philippine president Bongbong Marcos on the sidelines of the ASEAN–Russia Commemorative Summit in Kazan, June 18, 2026

When the dissolution of the Soviet Union was formalized on December 26, 1991, the Philippines under Philippine president Cory Aquino formally recognized the Russian Federation, the Soviet state's successor, on December 28, 1991, to normalize ties between the two nations and to bolster trade and cultural exchanges. In 2012, President Noynoy Aquino of the Philippines visited Vladivostok, Russia, for the APEC Summit.

During the presidency of Rodrigo Duterte in 2019, relations between Russia and the Philippines significantly improved; Russia's ambassador to the Philippines Igor Khovaev stated, "During the last two years, our two countries [have now properly] concluded more documents on bilateral cooperation in different fields than the previous 40 years." However, Duterte's successor, Bongbong Marcos—who sought a foreign policy aligned with the United States—allowed the US to deploy its weapon systems in the Philippines; this caught the attention of President Putin, who raised the possible deployment of missiles after noting of the US weapons in the Philippines.

== Bilateral relations ==
=== Economic relations ===
==== Filipino migration to Russia ====
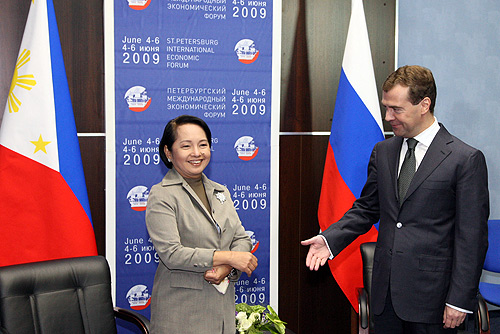
Then-Philippine president Gloria Macapagal Arroyo with then-Russian president Dmitry Medvedev in St. Petersburg for the 2009 International Economic Forum, June 5, 2009.

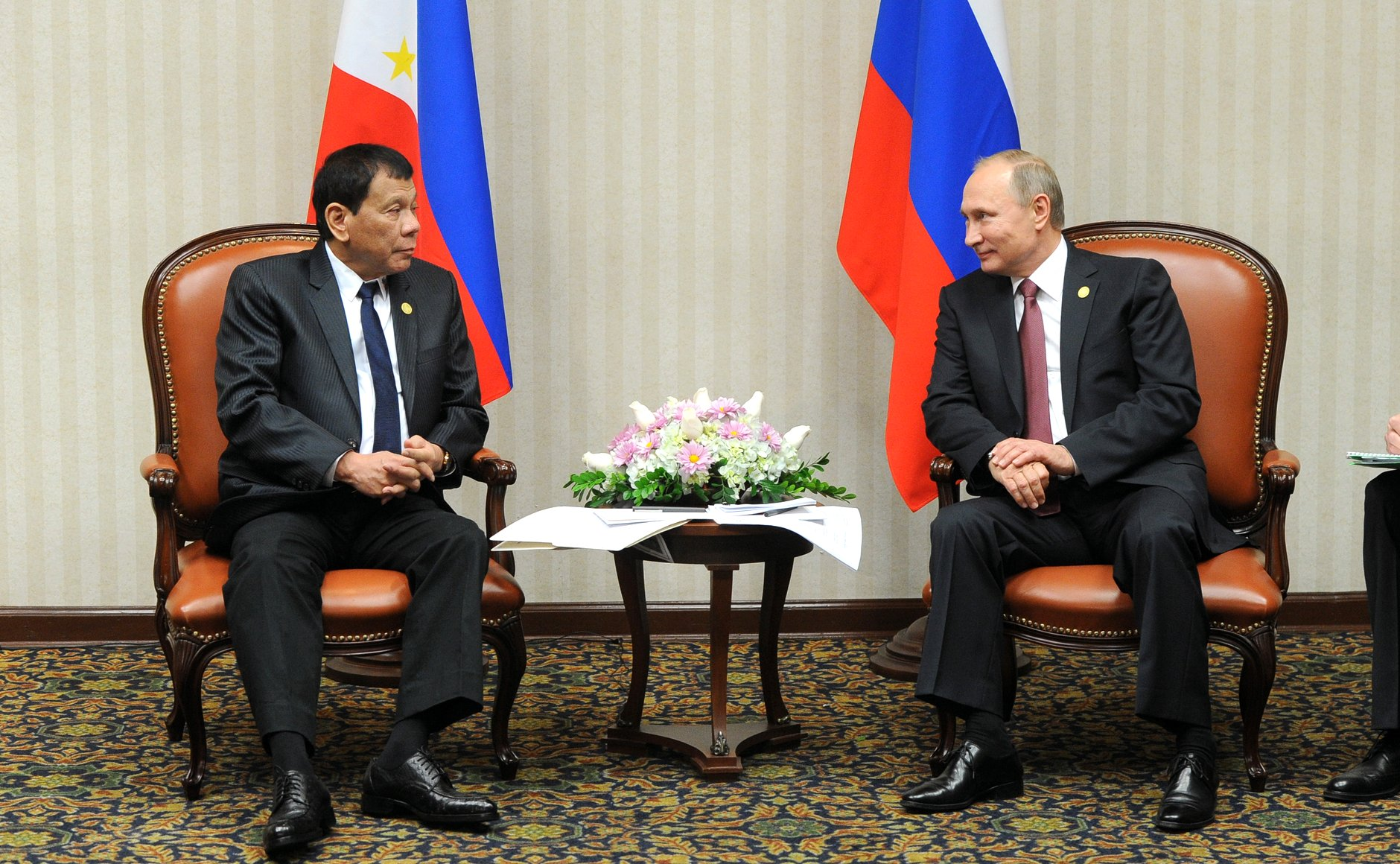
Then-Philippine president Rodrigo Duterte meets with Russian President Vladimir Putin on the sidelines of the APEC summit in Lima, Peru, November 19, 2016.

Filipino economic migrants began to flock to Russia in the early 2000s. In 2004, 2,010 Filipino nationals were registered to be staying in Russia. In 2013, that number increased to 4,335 according to statistics from the Commission on Filipinos Overseas (CFO). However, the estimated total becomes about 8,000 Filipinos in Russia when illegal immigrants are taken into account. About 93% of all Filipinos in Russia are in Moscow. Many Overseas Filipino Workers in Russia has professional training but most of them work in the household service sector as cleaners, cooks, drivers and nannies. The PH Department of Foreign Affairs counted "around 6,000 Filipinos living and working in Russia as of June 2017."

Due to a sharp increase in the number of Filipino nationals sought to work in private homes throughout Russia, the Philippine Government has deemed it necessary to impose new requirements on the direct hiring of Filipino housekeepers and nannies in Russia in order to secure their well-being through placement in qualified households as well as ensure the engagement of only competent staff.

==== Vehicle-purchases from Russia ====
Talks are also underway to make the Russian truck brand Kamaz available in the Philippines via the Philippine company Lifetruck International Inc. The signed memorandum of understanding anticipates the supply of at least 1,000 trucks before the end of 2020. "The parties have provisionally negotiated supplies of dump trucks, long-haul trucks and platform trucks at the recent stage", but they "will further agree upon a specific schedule of project implementation, the model range of Kamaz trucks for the Philippine market and subsequent activities". Lifetruck "will support promotion of Russian trucks in its turn. The agreement also contemplates establishment and development of the dealership network and service centers of Kamaz throughout Philippines". Lifetruck is listed in Kamaz's website as its sole Philippines-based dealer, distributor, and service center. If Kamaz thrives in the backdrop of Pres. Duterte's extensive, nationwide Build, Build, Build! project, Kamaz's success may encourage other Russian vehicle companies to enter the Philippine market.

==== Agricultural trade between Russia and the Philippines ====
The Philippine Department of Agriculture is planning trade mission to Moscow in order to investigate the untapped, unexplored Russian market. The hope is of signing an Implementing Agreement (IA) with the Russian Ministry of Agriculture, with the IA based on the Memorandum of Agreement (MOA) signed between the 2 agricultural authorities during Pres. Duterte (and cabinet)'s May 2017 abruptly-cut visit to Moscow. Under the MOA, Russia is to import $2.5 billion (US) in Philippine agriculture, which is significantly more than the $46 million annually exported to Russia currently. "[T]he new agreement will identify the areas of engagement between the two countries, including the investments by Russian business groups in the development of agriculture and aquaculture in the Bangsamoro Area."(As of yet, Philippine 3 fishing companies currently export products to Russia.) "The planning of the trade mission was primarily prompted by the efforts of the DA to find new markets for its coconut products in the face of very low prices of coco oil in the world market… [T]he Philippines is interested in importing fertilizers, wheat and modern farm machinery from Russia, while Russia is interested in importing coconut products, bananas and seafood."

"The first four Russian enterprises have received the right to supply poultry meat to the Philippines" starting 12 May 2019. The companies are the "Blagodarnensky poultry plant (a branch of the Stavropol Broiler company), the LISCo broiler company, the Vasilyevskaya poultry farm and the Bryansk Broiler." Also, "in 2018 the trade turnover between Russia and the Philippines increased threefold to $246 mln. At the same time, exports from Russia to that country increased fivefold to $208 mln. Deliveries of grain to the Philippine market increased almost fivefold last year, to 719,860 tonnes against 155,650 tonnes in 2017."

=== Security relations ===
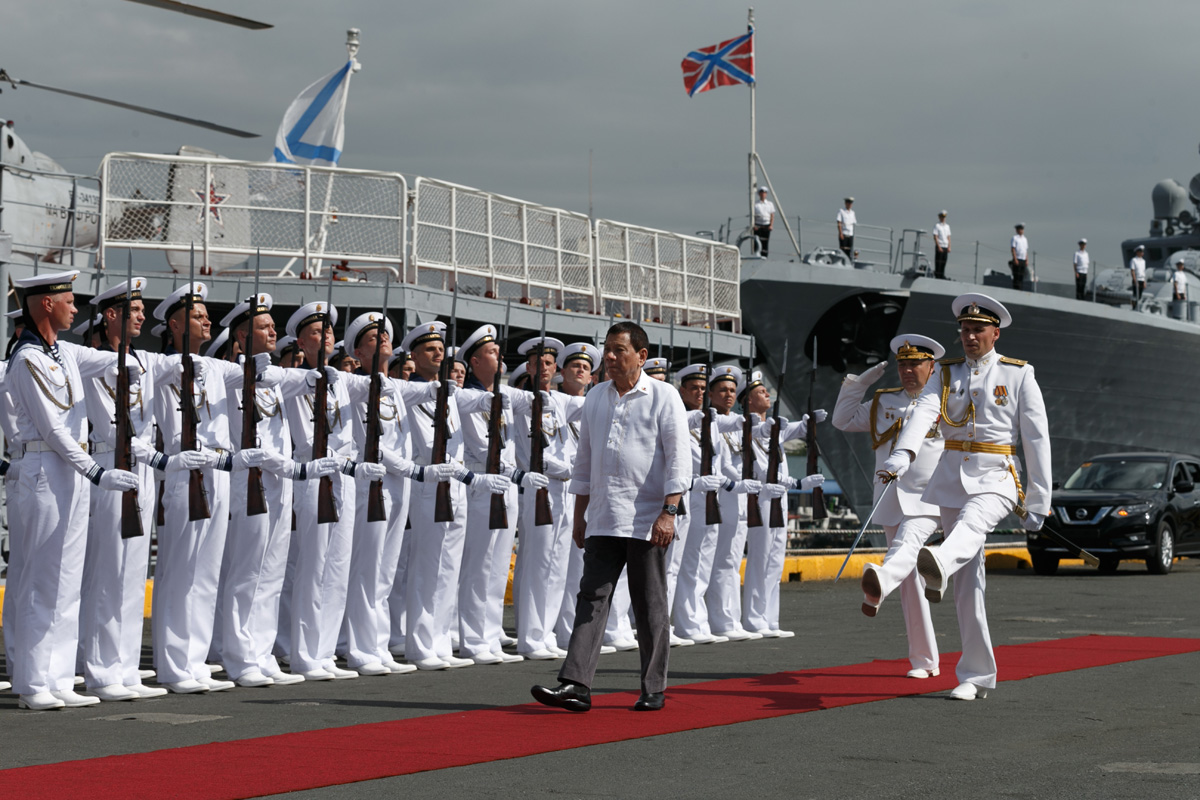
Admiral Panteleyev delivers Russian arms as aid to the Philippine government in the Battle of Marawi.

The Office of Defense Attaché in the Philippine Embassy in Moscow has been headed by Col. Dennis Pastor and with his administrative assistant T/Sgt. Pablito Igne since May 2018. (On 3 September 2019, Moscow sent to the Russian Embassy in Manila Col. Dmitry Nikitin, their 1st defense attaché, in an effort to strengthen military and technical cooperation with Manila.) Also, Philippine "[m]ilitary observers might be deployed to Russia next year to determine what kind of training exercises Filipino troops can participate in." Russia has already invited the Philippines to join its International Counter-Terrorism Database and has "conveyed the readiness of the Federal Protective Service of Russia to train members of the Presidential Security Group (PSG)", though a Moscow has already administered a VIP Protection Training Program to Manila's 21 PSG personnel sent for training from 27 February-11 March 2017.

Russia is interested in selling surface-to-air missile system to the Philippines. In December 2016, Philippine Defense Secretary Delfin Lorenzana said that the Philippines is interested in purchasing drones and sniper rifles from Russia to modernize the former's military program. On a later date, he also mentioned Russia as a finalist for submarine-procurement for its Kilo-class diesel-electric submarines, specifically the advanced version (Project 636 Varshavyanka) "considered to be the most noiseless from among Russian conventional subs" and "are furnished with modern radar and communications systems, the sonar, 533mm torpedoes and Kalibr cruise missiles", as opposed to the original, Soviet-era (Project 877 Paltus) edition. Talks are also underway for the purchase of 10 boats from the Kalashnikov Group that "produces the BK-18 multipurpose cutter, the BK-16 transport and landing boat, as well as the BK-10 high-speed assault boat and the BK-9 high-speed amphibious assault cutter" aside from its world-famous rifles. Armed Forces of the Philippines (AFP) technical working groups were sent to Russia "look into the Mil-Mi-17 "Hip" medium helicopter, Kilo-class diesel-electric submarine and other equipment being offered by Russia to the Philippines."

On 3–7 January 2017, two Russian Navy ships – the Udaloy-class destroyer Admiral Tributs and the Boris Chilikin-class fleet oiler Boris Butoma of the Russian Pacific Fleet – docked at the Manila South Harbor for a goodwill tour aimed at bolstering Philippines–Russia relations, especially in security. On 25 October 2017, the Udaloy-class destroyer Admiral Panteleyev delivered "20 units of Ural-4320 multi-purpose vehicles; 5,000 units of AKM Kalashnikov assault rifles, one million units 1943-type cartridges with steel core bullets; and 5,000 units of steel helmets" to assist Manila's efforts during the Marawi siege.

The Philippine Navy (PN) is also preparing its BRP Tarlac (LD-601) for the PN's historic, first-ever port-call to Russia scheduled for Friday 17 September 2018. The port visit to the Russian Pacific Fleet in Vladivostok is estimated to take 8–10 days and the actual visit to last 5 days. Afterward, it will also participate in the International Fleet Review from in Jeju, South Korea. Escorted by both Beijing's China Coast Guard and Tokyo's Japan Coast Guard while near the mutually-claimed Diaoyu/Senkaku Islands, the BRP Tarlac reached Russian waters on 1 October 2018 and was escorted by the Russian Albatros-class anti-submarine vessel Sovetskaya Gavan (P-350).

For the first time, Russia (via Rosoboronexport) is also participating in the Asian Defense & Security (ADAS)'s (third) "Defense, Security and Crisis Management Exhibition and Conference" 2018 show in Manila scheduled for 26–28 September 2018.

=== Space-research relations ===
The PH Department of Science and Technology (DOST) has agreed with the Russian space agency Roscosmos, "to proceed with negotiations of an intergovernmental framework agreement on space cooperation that will include use of Russian rockets to launch Philippine payloads such as micro- and nano-satellites as well as the establishment of a receiving station for the Global Navigation Satellite System" (GLONASS), Russia's alternative to American Global Positioning System (GPS).

With Manila's upcoming creation of a unified Philippine Space Agency (PhilSA), more cooperation with Moscow's Roscosmos is planned. The PhilSA's creation is mandated by the "Philippine Space Act" (Senate Bill No. 1983), which is expected to become law on/before 8 August 2019. If Pres. Duterte fails to veto SBN 1983 within 30days of presentation by Congress (which was on 9 July 2019), Philippine Space Act will become law on 8 August 2019. Of course, SBN 1983 can become law even before that if he signs it before that date. Filipino scholars are planned to study in Russia to learn space-technology development.

=== Sister cities and cooperation agreements ===
- Manila and Moscow - 30 June 2023 (Manila City Hall, Manila)
- Cebu Province and Saint Petersburg - 2009, renewed on 4 June 2024 (Smolny, Saint Petersburg) on the sidelines of the Saint Petersburg International Economic Forum
- Cebu City and Vladivostok - virtually signed in 2022, ceremonially again on 11 September 2023 (Vladivostok) on the sidelines of the Eastern Economic Forum

=== Other relations ===
On 3 January 2018, Russia's Ministry of Emergency Situations reported delivering a first batch of humanitarian aid to the Philippines via one ship carrying 25 tons of aid sent via Vladivostok, with two others (sent on December 9 and 23) still at sea. The ministry also planned on sending 495 tons of relief aid (mostly food and timber).

== See also ==
- List of ambassadors of Russia to the Philippines
- Philippines–Soviet Union relations
- Russian settlement in the Philippines
