= Corazon C. Aquino Hospital =

Government hospital in Zamboanga del Norte, Philippines

- City Government of Dipolog

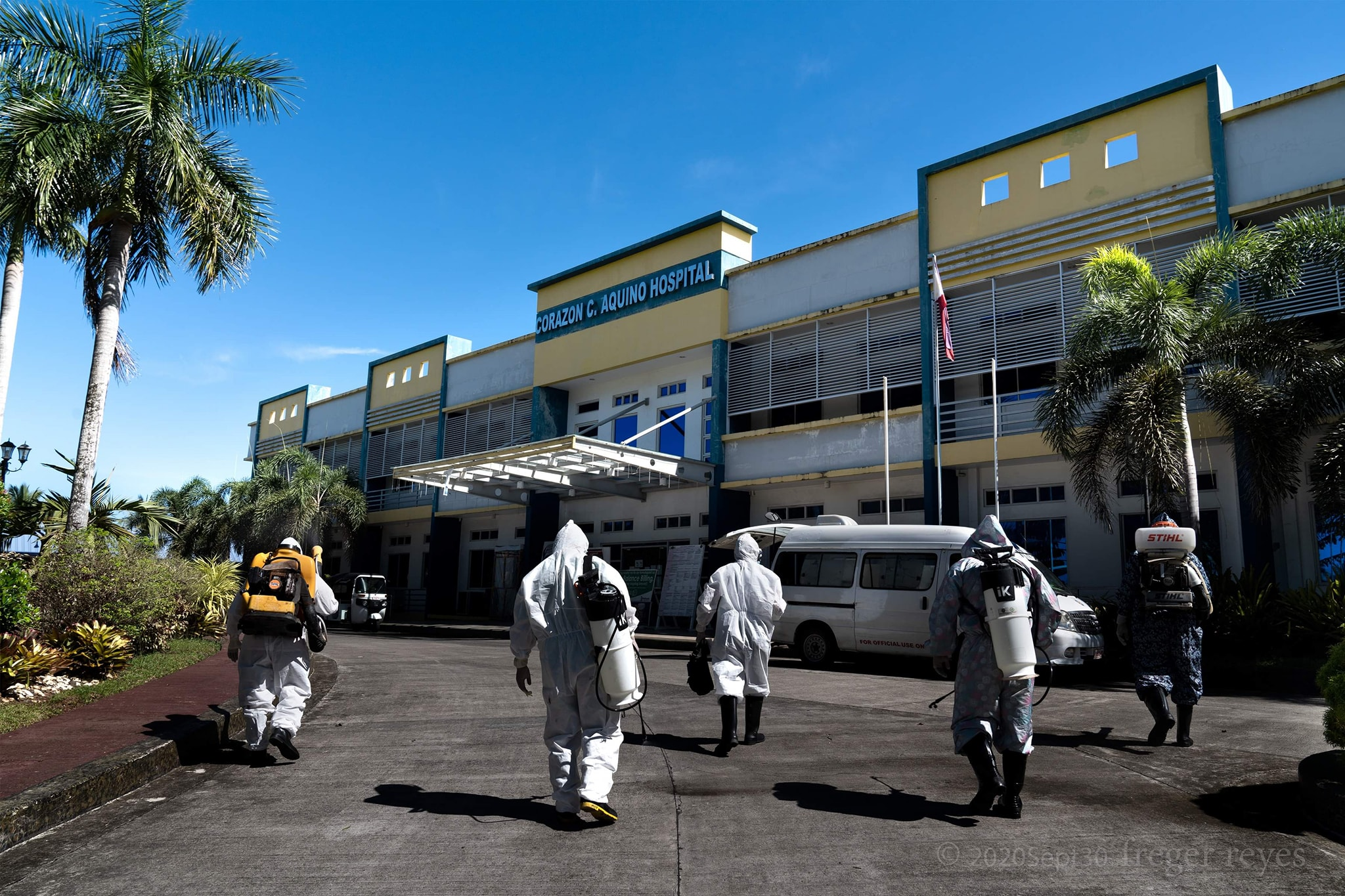
- CCAH during the COVID-19 pandemic, 2020

Geography
- Location: Dr. Santiago Calo Road, Biasong, Dipolog, Zamboanga del Norte, Zamboanga Peninsula, Philippines
- Coordinates: 8°35′34″N 123°20′38″E

Organization
- Care system: Public (PhilHealth)
- Funding: Government hospital
- Type: General

Services
- Standards: Philippine Department of Health
- Beds: 50

History
- Opened: 2015

Links
- Lists: Hospitals in the Philippines

The Corazon C. Aquino Hospital, is a tertiary hospital located in Barangay Biasong, Dipolog, Philippines. The center has an area of 3 hectares and consist of 2 stories and has a 300(?) bed-capacity. It also houses different private clinics of known physicians in the province with specialties in dermatology, dentistry, urology, and gynecology.

== History ==
Corazon C. Aquino Hospital started construction in 2011, completed construction in 2013, and opened in 2015 under the administration of then-mayor Evelyn T. Uy. The hospital is named after Corazon Aquino, the 11th President of the Philippines.

On July 29, 2015, while the hospital was operating softly from its recent opening, some public school children were brought to CCAH from Zamboanga del Norte Medical Center after such students experienced stomach pains from taking albendazole in a mass deworming undertaking by the Department of Health.

On October 17, 2016, as the City Government completed the construction of the new Divine Mercy Chapel located inside CCAH, its unveiling and blessing was led by then Manila Archbishop, Cardinal Luis Antonio Tagle, (while visiting the city for a religious conference held in the city), local officials, doctors, medical personnel, barangay officials, and government employees.

On September 25, 2020, after the first confirmed community COVID-19 transmission in Dipolog, CCAH was temporarily closed by then-mayor Darel Dexter T. Uy until October 15, 2020. This closure took effect after the hospital experienced an influx of probable and suspected COVID-19 patients.

== Future development ==
It was planned in 2017 that the City Government will commence construction of the new City Health Office (CHO-Dipolog) building adjacent to CCAH, with the intention of transferring CHO-Dipolog personnel, equipment, and supplies from the Old CHO-Dipolog building in Estaka to the hospital complex.

== See also ==
- Zamboanga del Norte Medical Center
