= Micronesia–Russia relations =

Federated States of Micronesia–Russia relations

- Federated States of Micronesia: Russia

Diplomatic mission
- No mission: Russian ambassador to the Philippines (1999–2022)

Envoy
- None: Marat Pavlov (last)

Diplomatic relations between the Federated States of Micronesia (FSM) and Russia began in March 1999. Prior to February 2022, relations were cordial with economic trade established; in that month however, the FSM severed ties with Russia over its invasion of Ukraine. It became the second country to sever ties with Russia, after Ukraine itself.

== Background ==
After World War I, the Empire of Japan took control of the islands, which had been a German colony, as part of the South Seas Mandate. After Allied victory over Imperial Japan in World War II, the islands of Micronesia became a Trust Territory of the Pacific Islands, administered by the United States (US). The creation of the United States Commercial Company in July 1947 to oversee imports and exports from Micronesia resulted in the exclusion of Japanese and Soviet trade with the islands.

The United States did not attempt to annex the islands, in part to pressure the Soviet Union, an Allied power that emerged as a post-war rival, to return the Kuril Islands to Japan after the war. The Soviet Union criticized US military outposts in Micronesia as colonialism, and in 1965 put forward a successful resolution in the UN's General Assembly calling upon "colonial powers to dismantle their military bases in their colonies". This was never put into practice for US military bases in the modern-day FSM, and the US military refused to provide the UN's Special Committee with information about Micronesian bases.

During the subsequent Cold War between the US and the Soviet Union, Micronesia remained an American trustee. Their status as a trustee gave other nations some degree of oversight via the United Nations. Until 1990, the Soviet Union threatened to veto any US attempts to dissolve the trusteeship while maintaining American military bases on the islands, wanting the islands to remain under UN supervision. In 1990, all 13 members of the United Nations Security Council, including the Soviet Union, voted to abolish the trusteeship. Micronesia remained in its existing Compact of Free Association with the US.

== History ==
=== Pre-Russian invasion of Ukraine ===
In 1999, diplomatic ties were established, but Russia has never had an embassy in Micronesia. Beginning around 2010, Russia began making a stronger effort to extend influence into the Pacific, including Micronesia. The Russian ambassador to the Philippines acted as chargé d'affaires for Micronesia, with the Russian Foreign Ministry hosting frequent meetings with the Pacific island nations. From 2010 to 2015, Nikolay Kudashev served as a non-resident ambassador to the Federated States of Micronesia, as well as Palau, the Marshall Islands, and the Philippines. He was succeeded by Igor Khovayev, who served as ambassador to the four Pacific nations from 2015 to 2020.

Economic trade included Russia exporting refined petroleum to the FSM ($8,610 in October 2018) and importing motor vehicle parts and accessories in return ($508 in February 2021). During the seventy-fourth session of the United Nations General Assembly in September 2019 in New York City, Russian Foreign Minister Sergey Lavrov highlighted cooperation between Russia and several Pacific Islands countries, and said that Pacific diplomatic personnel (including Micronesians) were taking courses at the Moscow State Institute of International Relations.

According to international law professor Joanna Siekiera, interest in Pacific natural resources from Russia, China, and Japan have led to greater cooperation and solidarity among the Pacific Islands Countries and Territories, including the FSM.

=== Post-invasion (2022–present) ===
When Russia launched a large-scale invasion of Ukraine on 24 February, further escalating the Russo-Ukrainian war, President David Panuelo was travelling from Pohnpei State to Yap State. He decided to suspend and sever relations between FSM and Russia that day, citing the FSM's recognition of Ukraine's right to defend its sovereignty. The FSM was the second country to cut ties with Russia because of the war, after Ukraine itself. Panuelo had previously discussed the potential response with his cabinet members, who had considered it likely that Russia would invade. The message conveying the severance of relations called the invasion "unambiguously villainous" and emphasised the FSM's commitment to respectful diplomacy.

In response to the decision, Russian press secretary Maria Zakharova said that the U.S. wanted to use Micronesia "to protect Neo-Nazism in Ukraine and the Nazi regime in Kiev." Panuelo responded that the FSM would restore relations with Russia "when (the Russian Federation) demonstrates actionable commitments to peace, friendship, cooperation and love in our common humanity", reiterating the FSM's alliance with the U.S. and commitment to supporting NATO. In March 2022, Panuelo wrote a letter to Xi Jinping, asking China to mediate for a ceasefire and withdrawal of Russian troops from Ukraine. Meanwhile, the Russian government included the Federated States of Micronesia on its "unfriendly countries and territories list".

Panuelo expressed admiration for Ukrainian President Volodymyr Zelenskyy and the Ukrainian people, noting that if the FSM had the resources to send aid, he would have done. Panuelo later criticized Russia in a speech at the United Nations. Panuelo's successor, Wesley Simina, has maintained the FSM condemnation of Russia, expressing solidarity with Ukraine. Despite the severance of diplomatic ties, as of 2025, Russian citizens could still freely travel to Micronesia without a visa.
