= Corazon Aquino =

President of the Philippines from 1986 to 1992

Corazon Aquino CCLH
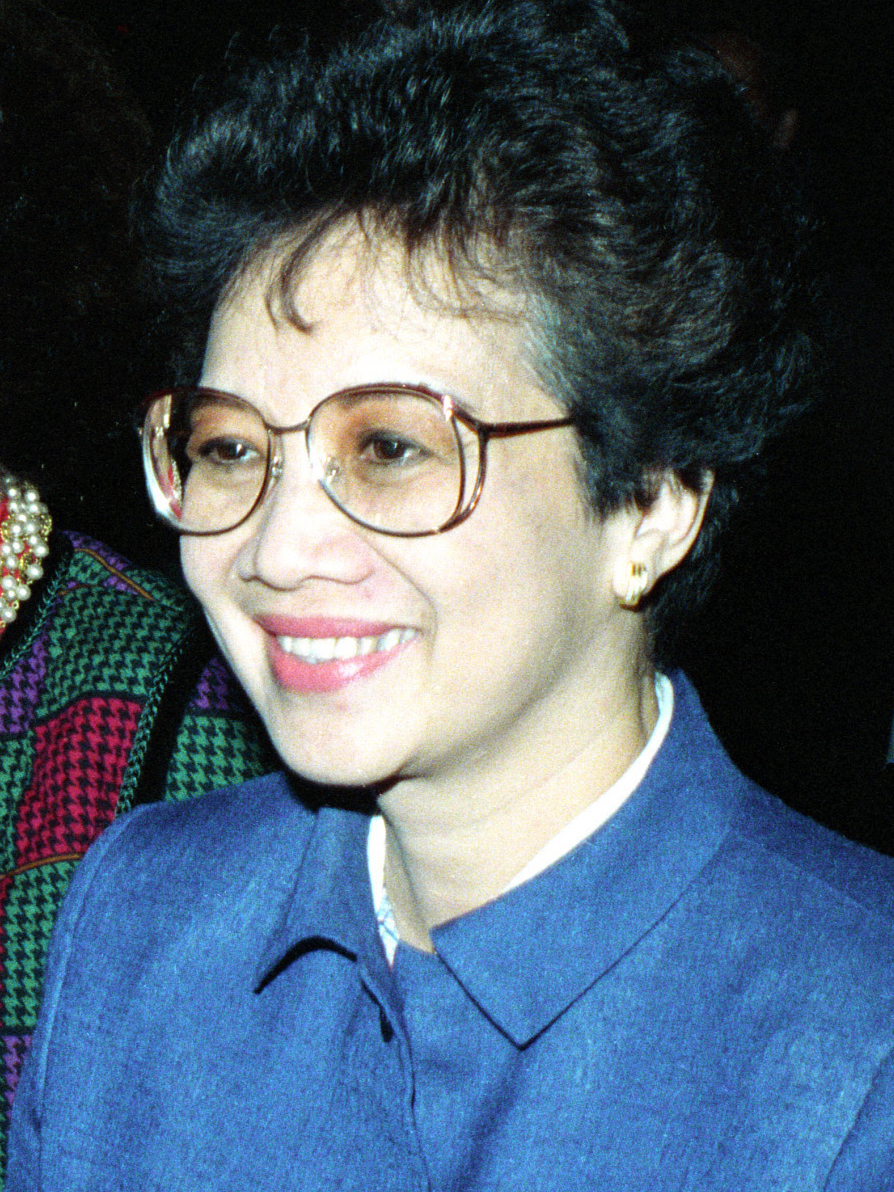
- Aquino in 1986

11th President of the Philippines
- In office February 25, 1986 – June 30, 1992
- Prime Minister: Salvador Laurel
- Vice President: Salvador Laurel
- Preceded by: Ferdinand Marcos
- Succeeded by: Fidel V. Ramos

Personal details
- Born: María Corazón Sumulong Cojuangco; January 25, 1933 Paniqui, Tarlac, Philippine Islands
- Died: August 1, 2009 (aged 76) Makati, Metro Manila, Philippines
- Resting place: Manila Memorial Park – Sucat, Parañaque, Philippines
- Party: Independent (1987–2009)
- Other political affiliations: UNIDO (1986–1987)
- Spouse: Ninoy Aquino (m. 1954; died 1983)
- Relations: Juan Sumulong (grandfather); Lorenzo Sumulong (uncle); Victor Sumulong (first cousin); Francisco Sumulong (uncle)
- Children: 5, including Noynoy and Kris
- Parent: José Cojuangco (father)
- Relatives: Cojuangco family; Aquino family (by marriage)
- Education: College of Mount Saint Vincent (BA); Far Eastern University (no degree)
- Occupation: Politician
- Nickname: Cory
- Corazon Aquino's voice Inaugural speech as the president of the Philippines (Recorded in 1986)

María Corazón "Cory" Sumulong Cojuangco-Aquino (/əˈkiːnoʊ/ ə-KEE-noh, Tagalog: [kɔɾaˈsɔn kɔˈhwaŋkɔ ʔɐˈkino]; January 25, 1933 – August 1, 2009) was a Filipino politician who served as the 11th president of the Philippines, serving from 1986 to 1992. The first female president in Philippine history, Aquino was the most prominent figure of the 1986 People Power Revolution, a non-violent movement which ended the two-decade rule of President Ferdinand Marcos and led to the establishment of the current democratic Fifth Philippine Republic. She has been regarded by media outlets as the "Mother of Democracy".

Aquino was married to Senator Benigno Aquino Jr., a prominent critic of President Marcos. The couple had five children, including 15th president Benigno Aquino III and entertainer Kris Aquino. After the assassination of her husband on August 21, 1983, she emerged as leader of the opposition against the president. In late 1985, Marcos called for a snap election, and Aquino ran for president with former Senator Salvador Laurel as her running mate for vice president. After the February 7, 1986, presidential election, the Batasang Pambansa proclaimed Marcos and his running mate Arturo Tolentino as the winners, which prompted allegations of electoral fraud and Aquino's call for massive civil disobedience actions.

Subsequently, the People Power Revolution, a non-violent mass demonstration movement, took place from February 22 to 25. With support from the Philippine Catholic Church and defections from the Armed Forces of the Philippines, the People Power Revolution ousted Marcos, and Aquino, with no prior political experience, was sworn in to the presidency on February 25, 1986.

As president, Aquino established a provisional government based on a transitional "Freedom Constitution" written by Neptali Gonzales, and spearheaded the development of the 1987 Constitution, which limited the powers of the presidency and re-established the bicameral Congress, removing the previous dictatorial government structure. The constitution also affirmed social justice and equality as guiding principles of national development, reinforcing efforts to promote civil liberties, democratic participation, and social cohesion following the end of authoritarian rule. Her economic policies focused on forging good economic standing amongst the international community as well as disestablishing Marcos-era crony capitalist monopolies, emphasizing the free market and responsible economy. Her administration pursued peace talks to resolve the Moro conflict, and the result of these talks was creation of the Autonomous Region in Muslim Mindanao.

Aquino's administration was criticized for the 1987 Mendiola Massacre, which resulted in the shooting deaths of at least 12 peaceful protesters by Philippine state security forces. The Philippines faced various natural calamities in the latter part of Aquino's administration, such as the 1990 Luzon earthquake, 1991 Mt. Pinatubo eruption and Tropical Storm Thelma. Several coup attempts were made against her government. She left office in 1992 and remained active in political activities. Aquino was diagnosed with colorectal cancer in 2008 and died the following year. Her funeral was the subject of global media coverage, and monuments and public landmarks in the country were named in her honor.

== Early life and education ==
Cory Aquino was born as María Corazón Sumulong Cojuangco on January 25, 1933, in Paniqui, Tarlac. She was born to the prominent Cojuangco family. Her father was José Cojuangco, a prominent Tarlac businessman and former congressman, and her mother was Demetria Sumulong, a pharmacist. Both of Aquino's parents were from prominent political families. Aquino's grandfather from her father's side, Melecio Cojuangco, was a member of the historic Malolos Congress, and Aquino's mother belonged to the politically influential Sumulong family of Rizal province, which included Juan Sumulong, who ran against Commonwealth President Manuel L. Quezon in 1941 and Senator Lorenzo Sumulong, who was later appointed by Aquino in the Constitutional Commission. Aquino was the sixth of eight children, two of whom died in infancy. Her siblings were Pedro, Josephine, Teresita, Jose Jr., and Maria Paz.

Aquino spent her elementary school days at St. Scholastica's College in Manila, where she graduated at the top of her class as valedictorian. She transferred to Assumption Convent, then also in Manila, to pursue high school studies. After her family moved to the United States, she attended the Assumption-run Ravenhill Academy in Philadelphia. She then transferred to Notre Dame Convent School in New York City, where she graduated from in 1949. During her high school years in the United States, Aquino volunteered for the campaign of U.S. Republican presidential candidate Thomas Dewey against Democratic incumbent U.S. President Harry S. Truman during the 1948 United States presidential election. After graduating from high school, she pursued her college education at the College of Mount Saint Vincent in New York, graduating in 1953 with a major in French and minor in mathematics.

== Wife of Benigno Aquino Jr. ==
After graduating from college, she returned to the Philippines and studied law at Far Eastern University in 1953. While attending, she met Benigno "Ninoy" S. Aquino Jr., who was the son of the late Speaker Benigno S. Aquino Sr. and a grandson of General Servillano Aquino. She discontinued her law education and married Benigno at the Our Lady of Sorrows Parish in Pasay, Rizal on October 11, 1954. The couple had five children: Maria Elena ("Ballsy"; born 1955), Aurora Corazon ("Pinky"; born 1957), Benigno Simeon III ("Noynoy"; 1960–2021), Victoria Elisa ("Viel"; born 1961) and Kristina Bernadette ("Kris"; born 1971).

Aquino initially had difficulty adjusting to provincial life when she and her husband moved to Concepcion, Tarlac in 1955. Aquino found herself bored in Concepcion, and welcomed the opportunity to have dinner with her husband inside the American military facility at nearby Clark Field. Afterwards, the Aquino family moved to a bungalow in suburban Quezon City.

Throughout her life, Aquino was known to be a devout Roman Catholic.

Corazon Aquino was fluent in French, Japanese, Spanish, and English aside from her native Tagalog and Kapampangan.

Ninoy Aquino, a former Nacionalista turned Liberal, rose to become the youngest governor in the country in 1961 and then the youngest senator ever elected to the Senate of the Philippines in 1967. For most of her husband's political career, Aquino remained a housewife who raised their children and hosted her spouse's political allies who would visit their Quezon City home. She would decline to join her husband on stage during campaign rallies, instead preferring to be in the back of the audience and listen to him. Unbeknownst to many at the time, Corazon Aquino sold some of her prized inheritance to fund the candidacy of her husband.

As Ninoy emerged as a leading critic of the government of President Ferdinand Marcos, he became seen as a strong candidate for president to succeed Marcos in the 1973 elections. However, Marcos, who was barred by the 1935 Constitution to seek a third term, declared martial law on September 21, 1972 and later abolished the constitution, thereby allowing him to remain in office. Ninoy Aquino was among the first to be arrested at the onset of martial law, and was later sentenced to death. During her husband's incarceration, Corazon Aquino stopped going to beauty salons or buying new clothes and prohibited her children from attending parties, until a priest advised her and her children to try to live as normal lives as possible.

Despite Corazon's initial opposition, Ninoy decided to run in the 1978 Batasang Pambansa elections from his prison cell as party leader of the newly created LABAN. Corazon Aquino campaigned on behalf of her husband and delivered a political speech for the first time in her life during this political campaign. In 1980 Ninoy suffered a heart attack, and Marcos allowed Senator Aquino and his family to leave for exile in the United States upon intervention from U.S. president Jimmy Carter so that Aquino could seek medical treatment.

On August 21, 1983, Ninoy ended his stay in the United States and returned without his family to the Philippines, where he was immediately assassinated on a staircase leading to the tarmac of Manila International Airport. The airport is now named Ninoy Aquino International Airport, renamed by the Congress in his honor in 1987. Corazon Aquino returned to the Philippines a few days later and led her husband's funeral procession, in which more than two million people participated.

== 1986 presidential campaign ==
Following her husband's assassination in 1983, Corazon Aquino became active in various demonstrations held against the Marcos regime. She began to assume the mantle of leadership left by her husband and became a figurehead of the anti-Marcos political opposition. On November 3, 1985, during an interview with American journalist David Brinkley on This Week with David Brinkley, Marcos suddenly announced snap elections that would be held within three months to dispel doubt against his regime's legitimate authority, an action that surprised the nation. The election was later scheduled to be held on February 7, 1986. A petition was organized to urge Aquino to run for president, headed by former newspaper publisher Joaquin Roces. On December 1, the petition of 1.2 million signatures was publicly presented to Aquino in an event attended by 15,000 people, and on December 3, Aquino officially declared her candidacy. United Opposition (UNIDO) party leader Salvador Laurel was chosen as Aquino's running mate as candidate for vice president.

During the campaign, Marcos attacked Corazon Aquino on her husband's previous ties to communists, characterizing the election as a fight "between democracy and communism". Aquino refuted Marcos' charge and stated that she would not appoint a single communist to her cabinet. Marcos also accused Aquino of playing "political football" with the United States in regards to the continued United States military presence in the Philippines at Clark Air Base and Subic Naval Base. Another point of attack for Marcos was Aquino's inexperience in public office. Marcos' campaign was characterized by sexist attacks, such as remarks by Marcos that Aquino was "just a woman" and that a woman's remarks should be limited to the bedroom.

The snap election was held on February 7, 1986, and was marred by massive electoral fraud, violence, intimidation, coercion, and disenfranchisement of voters. On February 11, while votes were still being tabulated, former Antique Governor Evelio Javier, who had been director of Aquino's campaign in Antique, was assassinated. During the tallying of votes conducted by the Commission on Elections (COMELEC), 30 poll computer technicians walked out to contest the alleged election-rigging being done in favor of Marcos. Years later it was claimed that the walkout of computer technicians was led by Linda Kapunan, wife of Lt Col Eduardo Kapunan, a leader of Reform the Armed Forces Movement that plotted to attack the Malacañang Palace and kill Marcos and his family, leading to a partial reevaluation of the walkout event.

On February 15, 1986, the Batasang Pambansa, which was dominated by Marcos' ruling party and its allies, declared President Marcos as the winner of the election. However, NAMFREL's electoral count showed that Corazon Aquino had won. Aquino claimed victory according to NAMFREL's electoral count and called for a rally dubbed "Tagumpay ng Bayan" (People's Victory Rally) the following day to protest the declaration by the Batasang Pambansa. Aquino also called for boycotts against products and services from companies controlled or owned by individuals closely allied with Marcos. The rally was held at the historic Rizal Park in Luneta, Manila and drew a pro-Aquino crowd of around two million people. The dubious election results drew condemnation from both domestic and foreign powers. The Catholic Bishops' Conference of the Philippines issued a statement strongly criticizing the conduct of the election, describing the election as violent and fraudulent. The United States Senate likewise condemned the election. Aquino rejected a power-sharing agreement proposed by the American diplomat Philip Habib, who had been sent as an emissary by U.S. President Ronald Reagan to help defuse the tension.

=== Accession as president ===
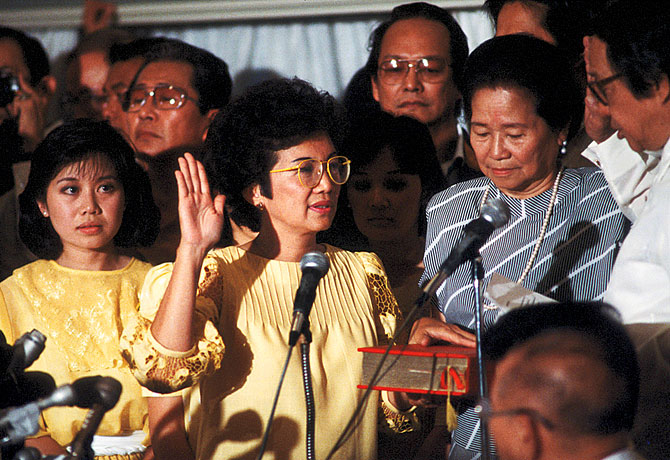
Aquino takes the oath of office before Chief Justice Claudio Teehankee Sr. in Club Filipino, San Juan on February 25, 1986

On February 22, 1986, disgruntled and reformist military officers led by Defense Minister Juan Ponce Enrile and General Fidel V. Ramos surprised the nation and the international community by the announcement of their defection from the Marcos government, citing a strong belief that Aquino was the real winner in the contested presidential election. Enrile, Ramos, and the rebel soldiers then set up operations in Camp Aguinaldo, the headquarters of the Armed Forces of the Philippines, and Camp Crame, the headquarters of the Philippine Constabulary, across Epifanio de los Santos Avenue (EDSA). Cardinal Sin appealed to the public in a broadcast over Church-run Radyo Veritas, and millions of Filipinos gathered to the part of Epifanio De Los Santos Avenue between the two camps to give their support and prayers to the rebels. At that time, Aquino was meditating in a Carmelite convent in Cebu. Upon learning of the defection, Aquino and Cardinal Sin appeared on Radyo Veritas to rally behind Enrile and Ramos. Aquino then flew back to Manila to prepare for the takeover of the government.

Aquino was sworn in as the eleventh president of the Philippines on February 25, 1986. An hour after Aquino's inauguration, Marcos held his own inauguration ceremony at the Malacañang Palace. Later that same day, Ferdinand E. Marcos fled from the Philippines to Hawaii.

== Presidency (1986–1992) ==
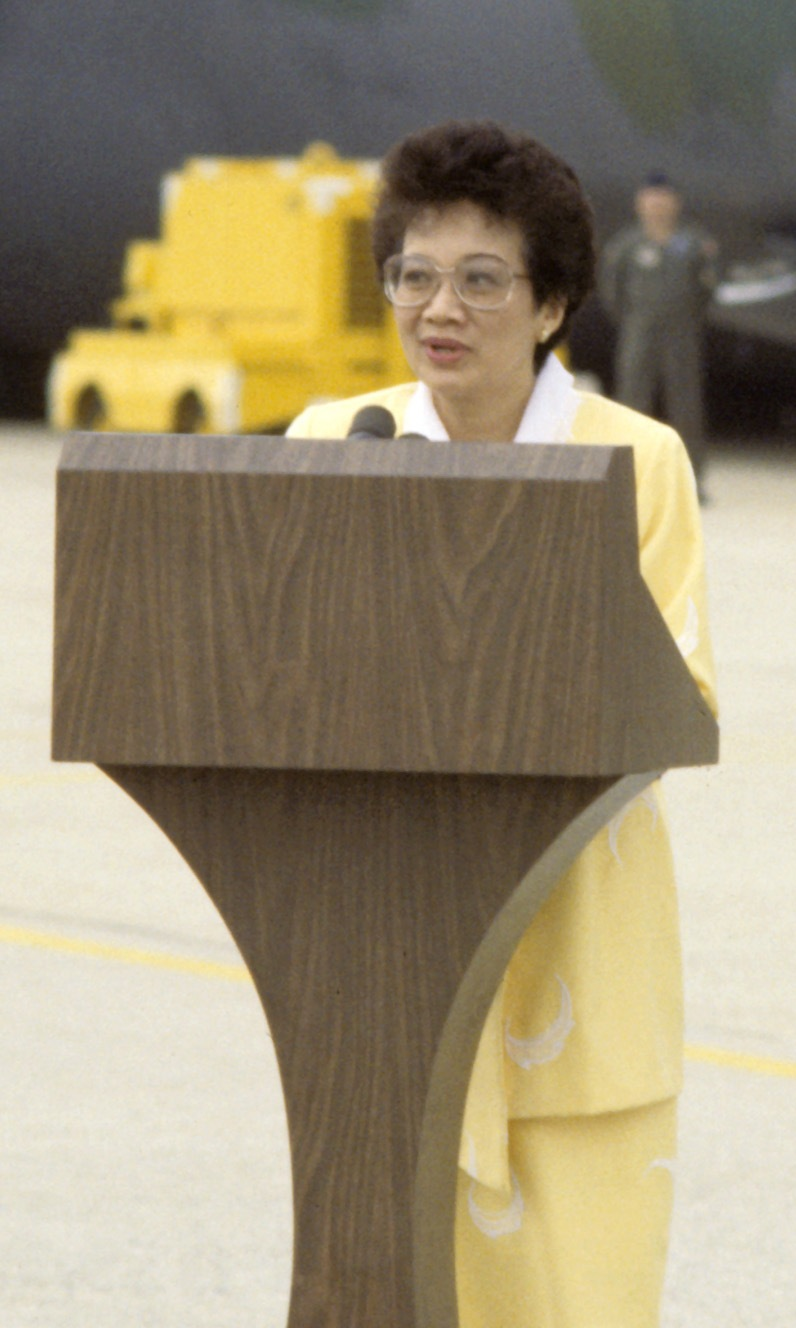
Aquino during a ceremony honoring the United States Air Force

Corazon Aquino's accession to the presidency marked the end of authoritarian rule in the Philippines. Aquino is the first female president of the Philippines and is still the only president of the Philippines to have never held any prior political position. Aquino is regarded as the first female president in Asia.

=== Transitional government and creation of new constitution ===
Presidential styles of Corazon Aquino
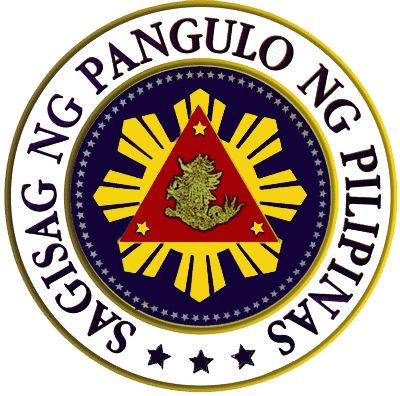
- Reference style: Her Excellency
- Spoken style: Your Excellency
- Alternative style: Madam President

On February 25, 1986, the first day of her administration, Aquino issued Proclamation No. 1, which announced an intention to reorganize the government and called on all officials appointed by Marcos to resign, starting with members of the Supreme Court. On March 25, 1986, President Aquino issued Proclamation No. 3, which announced a transitional government into a democratic system. She abolished the 1973 Constitution that was in force during the martial law era, and by decree issued the provisional 1986 Freedom Constitution, pending the ratification of a more formal and comprehensive charter. This constitutional allowed her to exercise both executive and legislative powers during the period of transitional government.

After the issuance of Proclamation No. 1, all 15 members of the Supreme Court submitted their resignations. Aquino then reorganized the membership of the Supreme Court with the stated purpose of restoring its judicial independence. On May 22, 1986, in the case Lawyers League v. President Aquino, the reorganized Supreme Court declared the Aquino government as "not merely a de facto government but in fact and law a de jure government", and affirmed its legitimacy.

Aquino appointed all 48 members of the 1986 Constitutional Commission ("Con-Com"), led by retired activist and former Supreme Court Associate Justice Cecilia Muñoz-Palma, which was tasked with writing a new constitution. The Commission completed its final draft of the Constitution in October 1986.

On February 2, 1987, the Constitution of the Philippines was ratified by nationwide plebiscite. It remains the constitution of the Philippines to the present day. The Constitution established a bill of rights and a three-branch government consisting of the executive department, the legislative department, and the judicial department. The Constitution restored the bicameral Congress, which in 1973 had been abolished by Marcos and replaced with first the Batasang Bayan and later the Batasang Pambansa. The ratification of the new Constitution was soon followed by the election of senators and the election of House of Representatives members on May 11, 1987, as well as local elections on January 18, 1988.

=== Legal reforms ===
After the ratification of the constitution, Aquino promulgated two landmark legal codes, namely, the Family Code of 1987, which reformed the civil law on family relations, and the Administrative Code of 1987, which reorganized the structure of the executive department of government. Another landmark law that was enacted during her tenure was the 1991 Local Government Code, which devolved national government powers to local government units (LGUs). The new Code enhanced the power of LGUs to enact local taxation measures and assured them of a share in the national revenue.

During Aquino's tenure, vital economic laws such as the Built-Operate-Transfer Law, Foreign Investments Act, and the Consumer Protection and Welfare Act were also enacted.

Although capital punishment was abolished by the 1987 Constitution, President Aquino later pushed for its reinstatement by 1989, and was further convinced in her stance by early 1990 after the deaths of two young rape victims in Pangasinan.

=== Socio-economic policies ===
Economy of the Philippines under President Corazon Aquino 1986–1992
Population
- 1986: $\approx$ 56 million

Gross Domestic Product (constant 1985 prices)
- 1986: ▲PHP 591,423 million
- 1991: ▲PHP 716,522 million

Real GDP growth (% change)
- 1986: ▲3.4%
- 1987: ▲4.3%
- 1988: ▲6.8%
- 1989: ▲6.2%
- 1990: ▲3.0%
- 1991: ▼ -0.4%
- 1992: ▲0.4%
- Average yearly growth rate, 1986–92: ▲3.4%

Per capita income (constant 1985 prices)
- 1986: ▲PHP 10,622
- 1991: ▲PHP 11,250

Total exports
- 1986: ▲PHP 160,571 million
- 1991: ▲PHP 231,515 million

Exchange rates
- 1986: 1 USD = 20.38 PHP; 1 PHP = 0.05 USD
- 1991: 1 USD = 27.61 PHP; 1 PHP = 0.04 USD

The economy posted a positive growth of 3.4% during Aquino's first year in office, and continued to grow at an overall positive rate throughout her tenure for an average rate of 3.4% from 1986 to 1992. Real GDP growth suffered a 0.4% decrease in 1991 in the aftermath of the 1989 coup attempt by the Reform the Armed Forces Movement, which shook international confidence in the Philippine economy and hindered foreign investment.

Aquino made fighting inflation one of her priorities after the nation suffered from skyrocketing prices during the last years of the Marcos administration. The last six years of the Marcos administration recorded an average annual inflation rate of 20.9%, which peaked in 1984 at 50.3%. From 1986 to 1992, the Philippines recorded an average annual inflation rate of 9.2%. During the Aquino administration, the annual inflation rate peaked at 18.1% in 1991; a stated reason for this increase was panic buying during the Gulf War. Overall, the economy under Aquino had an average growth of 3.8% from 1986 to 1992.

==== De-monopolization ====
One of Aquino's first actions as president was to seize Marcos' multi-billion dollar fortune of ill-gotten wealth. On February 28, 1986, four days into her presidency, Aquino formed the Presidential Commission on Good Government (PCGG), which was tasked with retrieving Marcos' domestic and international fortune.

After his declaration of martial law in 1972 and his consolidation of authoritarian power, President Ferdinand Marcos issued various government decrees that awarded monopoly or oligopoly power over entire industries to various close associates, in a scheme later regarded as crony capitalism. President Aquino pursued a market liberalization agenda to combat this problem. President Aquino particularly targeted the sugar industry and the coconut industry for de-monopolization.

==== Debt ====
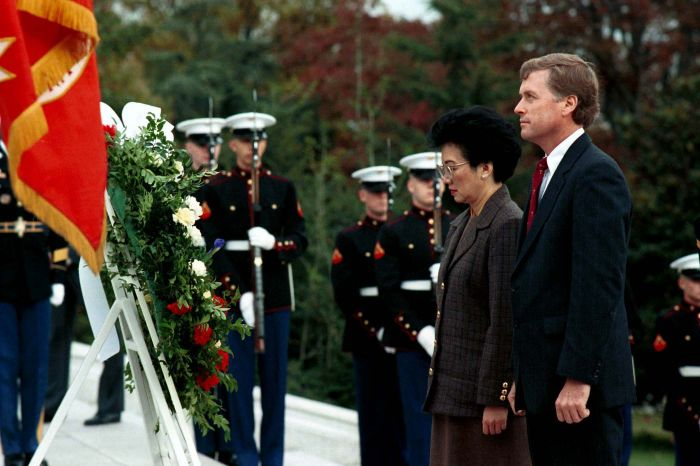
Aquino with U.S. Vice President Dan Quayle participate in the Veterans' Day Service at Arlington National Cemetery on November 10, 1989.

Throughout the tenure of President Ferdinand Marcos, government foreign debt had ballooned from less than $3 billion in 1970 to $28 billion by the end of his administration, through privatization of bad government assets and deregulation of many vital industries. The debt had badly tarnished the international credit standing and economic reputation of the country.

President Aquino inherited the debt of the Marcos administration and weighed all options on what to do with the debt, including not paying the debt. Aquino eventually chose to honor all the debts that were previously incurred in order to clear the country's economic reputation. Her decision proved to be unpopular but Aquino defended it, saying that was the most practical move. Beginning in 1986, the Aquino administration paid off $4 billion of the country's outstanding debts to improve its international credit ratings and attract the attention of foreign investors. This move also ensured lower interest rates and longer payment terms for future loans. During the Aquino administration, the Philippines acquired an additional $9 billion debt, increasing the net national debt by $5 billion within six years due to the need to infuse capital and money into the economy. The Aquino administration was able to reduce the Philippines' external debt-to-GDP ratio by 20.1 percent, from 87.9 percent at the start of the administration to 67.8 percent in 1991.

==== Agrarian reform ====
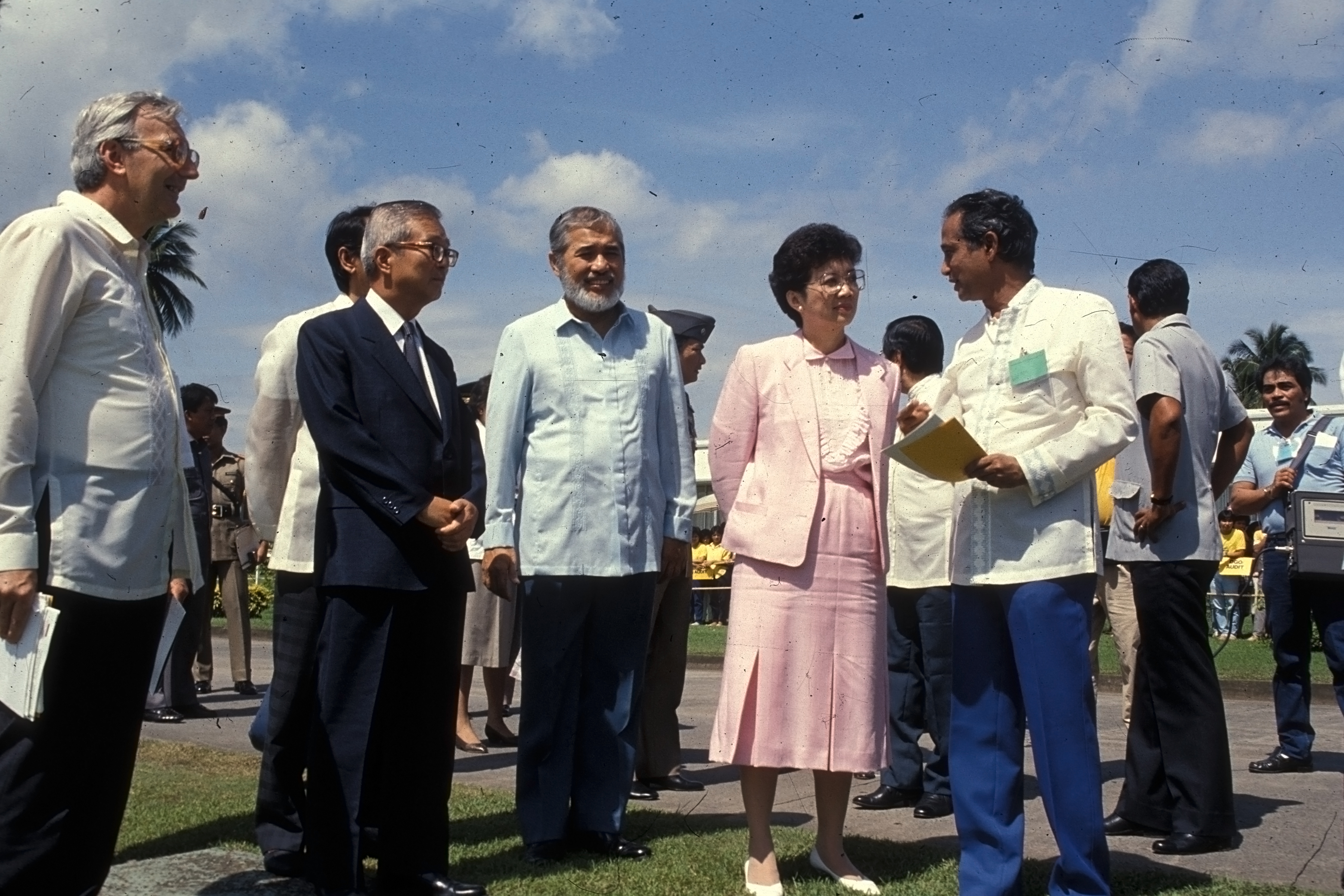
Aquino holds talks with the officials from the International Rice Research Institute in Los Baños, Laguna.

President Aquino envisioned agrarian and land reform as the centerpiece of her administration's social legislative agenda. However, her family background and social class as a privileged daughter of a wealthy and landed clan became a lightning rod of criticisms against her land reform agenda.

After the Mendiola Massacre and in response to calls for agrarian reform, President Aquino issued Presidential Proclamation 131 and Executive Order 229 on July 22, 1987, which outlined her land reform program, including sugar lands. In 1988, with the backing of Aquino, the new Congress of the Philippines passed Republic Act No. 6657, more popularly known as the "Comprehensive Agrarian Reform Law" (CARP), which paved the way for the redistribution of agricultural lands from landowners to tenant-farmers. Landowners were paid in exchange by the government through just compensation, and were also not allowed to retain more than five hectares of land. The law also allowed corporate landowners to "voluntarily divest a proportion of their capital stock, equity or participation in favor of their workers or other qualified beneficiaries", in lieu of turning over their land to the government for redistribution. Despite the flaws in the law, the Supreme Court upheld its constitutionality in 1989, declaring that the implementation of CARP was "a revolutionary kind of expropriation".

Corazon Aquino herself was subject to a controversy that centered on Hacienda Luisita, a 6,453-hectare estate located in the province of Tarlac which she and her siblings inherited from her father José Cojuangco. Instead of land distribution, Hacienda Luisita reorganized itself into a corporation and distributed stock. As such, ownership of agricultural portions of the hacienda was transferred to the corporation, which in turn, gave its shares of stocks to farmers. Critics argued that Aquino bowed to pressure from relatives by allowing stock redistribution in lieu of land redistribution under CARP.

The stock redistribution scheme was revoked in 2006, when the Department of Agrarian Reform ordered the mandatory redistribution of land to tenant-farmers of Hacienda Luisita. The Department of Agrarian Reform had looked into its revocation since 2004, when violence erupted in the hacienda over the retrenchment of workers, leaving seven people dead.

==== Kabisig People's Movement ====
On June 12, 1990, President Aquino launched the Kabisig movement to address the issue of widespread poverty by accelerating grassroots projects. She announced the launch during her Independence Day address at the Quirino Grandstand in Manila, and invited pro-administration parties such as the Liberal Party, the Laban ng Demokratikong Pilipino (LDP), and PDP-Laban to join the movement. A group of government officials led by Oscar Orbos, secretary of transportation and communications, was then tasked to draft an action program for Kabisig. Mario Taguiwalo, a health undersecretary and screenwriter, was appointed head of the Kabisig secretariat, while Executive Secretary Catalino Macaraig Jr. was named executive coordinator, with three governors: Roberto "Obet" Pagdanganan of Bulacan, Bren Guiao of Pampanga, and Daniel Lacson Jr. of Negros Occidental, joining as Kabisig coordinators representing local government units.

However, in the two weeks after Kabisig's launch, several pro-administration members of government criticized the movement. Senator Wigberto Tañada noted that the term "Kabisig" had been used before by President Ferdinand Marcos in December 1985 for his "Kabisig sa Diwang Pilipino" project to promote his New Society programs prior to the 1986 snap election. The LDP also expressed concerns about the movement due to its surprise announcement. On June 20, senator and LDP president Neptali Gonzales gave a speech before the Manila Jaycees criticizing Kabisig's sudden launch as possibly indicative of a "very small, shadowy but extremely powerful group" operating behind the scenes. Aquino's brother Jose Cojuangco Jr., an LDP member, also expressed the same concern, warning that Kabisig could be used to block the government's decentralization efforts; he stated that "this could happen because Kabisig has no clear cut objective. [...] As of now, we don't know anything about the structure and objectives of the movement." In July, Governor Pagdanganan was appointed its secretary-general, and by October 5, the movement was institutionalized by President Aquino as the Kabisig People's Movement through Proclamation No. 650,

By March 1992, Aquino replaced Pagdanganan with Governor Guiao as Kabisig secretary-general after Pagdanganan expressed support for LDP presidential candidate Ramon Mitra Jr. instead of Kabisig-backed Fidel V. Ramos.

=== Coup attempts on Aquino government ===
From 1986 to 1990, numerous coup attempts were enacted on the Aquino administration and the new Philippine government. Many of these attempts were conducted by the Reform the Armed Forces Movement, who attempted to establish a military government, while other attempts were conducted by loyalists to former President Marcos.

From 1986 to 1987, there were six plots to overthrow the Aquino government, with the deadliest being the August 1987 attempt which left 53 dead. The most serious attempt was staged in December 1989, following which President Aquino established a fact-finding commission headed by then-COMELEC Chairman Hilario Davide Jr.

=== Mendiola massacre and cabinet infighting ===
On January 22, 1987, during the era of transition government and shortly before the nationwide plebiscite to ratify the Constitution, 12 citizens were killed and 51 were injured in the Mendiola Massacre. The incident was initially a peaceful protest by agrarian workers and farmers led by the Kilusang Magbubukid ng Pilipinas who had marched to the historic Mendiola Street near the Malacañan Palace to demand genuine land reform. The massacre occurred when Marines fired at farmers who tried to go beyond the designated demarcation line set by the police. The massacre resulted in several resignations from Aquino's cabinet, including Jose W. Diokno, head of the Presidential Committee on Human Rights, chairman of the Commission on Human Rights (CHR), and chairman of the government panel in charge of negotiations with rebel forces resigned from his government posts. His daughter Maris said, "It was the only time we saw him near tears."

In September 1987, Vice President Doy Laurel resigned as secretary of foreign affairs. In his resignation letter to Aquino, Laurel stated, "the past years of Marcos are now beginning to look no worse than your first two years in office. And the reported controversies and scandals involving your closest relatives have become the object of our people's outrage. From 16,500 NPA regular when Marcos fell, the communists now claim an armed strength of 25,200. From city to countryside, anarchy has spread. There is anarchy within the government, anarchy within the ruling coalesced parties and anarchy in the streets."

Finance Minister Jaime Ongpin, who had successfully advocated for paying external debt incurred during Marcos' administration, was dismissed by Aquino in September 1987 and later died in an apparent suicide in December 1987. His widow stated that he had been depressed due to infighting in Aquino's cabinet and lack of significant change since the People Power Revolution.

Soon after the Mendiola Massacre, the Aquino administration and Congress worked to pass significant agrarian reform, which culminated in the passage of the Comprehensive Agrarian Reform Law (CARP).

=== Peace talks with Moro and communist insurgencies ===
President Aquino conducted peace talks with the Moro National Liberation Front (MNLF), an armed Moro Muslim insurgency group that sought to establish an independent Moro state within Mindanao. Aquino met with MNLF leader Nur Misuari and various MNLF groups in Sulu. In 1989, the Autonomous Region in Muslim Mindanao (ARMM) was created under Republic Act No. 6734 or the ARMM Organic Act, which established the Moro majority areas in the Mindanao island group as an autonomous region with its own government. The Autonomous Region in Muslim Mindanao lasted from 1989 to 2019, after which it was succeeded by the Bangsamoro Autonomous Region in Muslim Mindanao (BARMM).

The establishment of the Autonomous Region in Muslim Mindanao was opposed by the Moro Islamic Liberation Front (MILF), a militant splinter group from the MNLF that sought to secede from the Philippines to establish an Islamic state in Mindanao. Peace talks with MILF began in 1997 under President Fidel Ramos and violent insurgency officially continued until 2014, when peace accords were formally signed between MILF and the administration of President Benigno Aquino III that would lead to the creation of the BARMM.

The establishment of the ARMM also led to the establishment of Abu Sayyaf, a terrorist group founded in 1989 by Abdurajak Abubakar Janjalani and composed of radical former members of the MNLF. Terrorist attacks by Abu Sayyaf would start in 1995 and continue to the present day, including the 2004 bombing of the MV Superferry 14 that resulted in the deaths of 116 people.

Shortly after becoming president, Aquino ordered the release of hundreds of political prisoners imprisoned during the Marcos era, including communist insurgents belonging to the Communist Party of the Philippines. These releases included leaders such as Communist Party of the Philippines founder Jose Maria Sison and New People's Army founder Bernabe Buscayno, which the military strongly resisted. Preliminary peace talks with the CPP ended after the Mendiola Massacre on January 22, 1987, during which at least 12 farmers were killed at a protest rally.

=== Closing of United States military bases ===
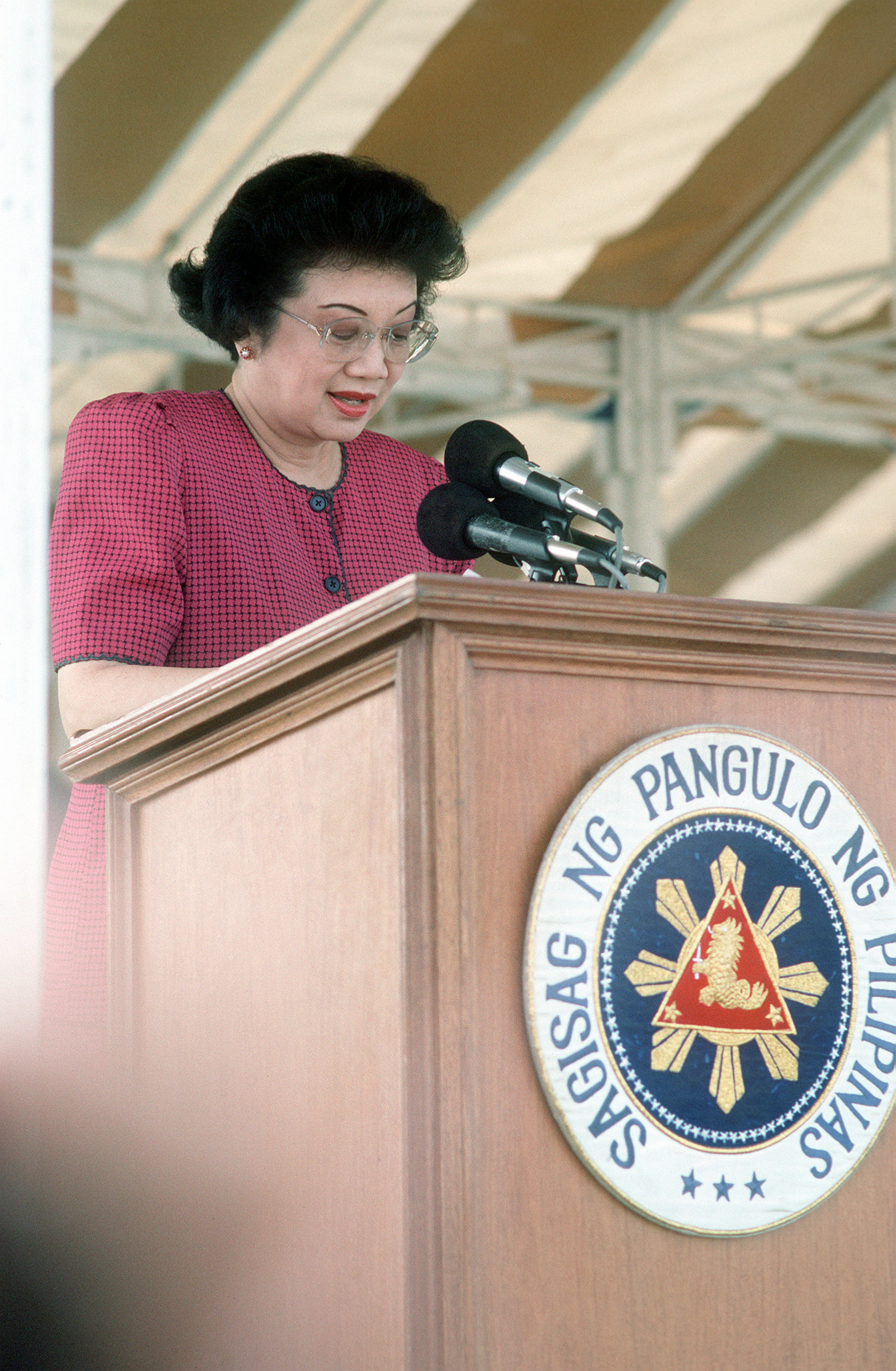
Aquino addresses base workers at a rally at Remy Field concerning jobs for Filipino workers after the Americans withdraw from the U.S. facilities.

Soon after Aquino took office, several Philippine senators declared that the presence of U.S. military forces in the Philippines was an affront to national sovereignty. The senators called for the United States military to vacate U.S. Naval Base Subic Bay and Clark Air Base, and Aquino opposed their demand. The United States objected by stating that they had leased the property and that the leases were still in effect. The United States stated that the facilities at Subic Bay were unequaled anywhere in Southeast Asia and a U.S. pullout could make all of that region of the world vulnerable to an incursion by the Soviet Union or by a resurgent Japan. Another issue with the demand was that thousands of Filipinos worked at these military facilities and they would lose their jobs if the U.S. military moved out. Aquino opposed the Senate's demand and believed that the bases should have remained. Aquino organized a protest against the pullout, which only gathered between 100,000 and 150,000 supporters, far short of the 500,000 to 1 million that had been originally expected.

The matter was still being debated when Mount Pinatubo erupted in June 1991, covering the entire area with volcanic ash. Despite attempts to continue the Subic Base, Aquino finally conceded. In December 1991, the government served notice that the U.S. had to close the base by the end of 1992.

=== Natural disasters and calamities ===
On December 20, 1987, the MV Doña Paz sank after a collision with the oil tanker MV Vector. The final death toll exceeded 4,300 people, and the sinking has been called the deadliest peacetime maritime disaster of the 20th century. In the aftermath, Aquino addressed the incident as "a national tragedy of harrowing proportions".

The 1990 Luzon earthquake was a 7.8 magnitude earthquake that struck the island of Luzon. It left an estimate of 1,621 people dead and massive property damage.

In 1991, a volcanic eruption of Mount Pinatubo, then thought to be dormant, killed around 800 people and caused widespread long-term devastation of agricultural lands in Central Luzon. Around 20,000 residents had to be evacuated and around 10,000 people were left homeless by the event. It was the second largest terrestrial eruption of the 20th century.

On November 1, 1991 Tropical Storm Thelma (also known as Typhoon Uring) caused massive flooding in Ormoc City, leaving around 5,000 dead in what was then considered to be the deadliest typhoon in Philippine history. On November 8, Aquino declared all of Leyte a disaster area.

=== Electrical power grid inadequacy ===
During Aquino's presidency, electric blackouts was common in Metro Manila. Blackouts had been a common occurrence in the region since 1974, when Marcos was in power. In Manila, residents experienced 7–12 hours-long blackouts, which severely affected its businesses. By the departure of Aquino in June 1992, businesses in Manila and nearby provinces had lost nearly $800 million since the preceding March.

Corazon Aquino's 1986 decision to deactivate the Bataan Nuclear Power Plant (BNPP), which was built during the Marcos administration, contributed to further electricity crises in the 1990s, as the 620 megawatts capacity of the plant would have been enough to cover the shortfall at that time. Critics of the BNPP had stated that the power plant was unsafe, and cited the millions of dollars in bribes paid to President Marcos to allow its construction. The administration had failed to provide for an adequate replacement for the plant before her term had completed, and President Corazon Aquino ended her term in 1992 with the country reeling under a severe power shortage crisis.

=== Influence in 1992 presidential election ===
The 1987 Constitution limited the president to a single six-year term with no possibility of re-election. As the end of her presidency drew near, close advisers and friends told Aquino that since she was not inaugurated under the 1987 Constitution, her term beginning 1986, she was still 'eligible' to seek the presidency again in the upcoming 1992 elections, the first presidential elections held under normal and peaceful circumstances since 1965. However, Aquino firmly declined the requests for her to seek reelection, citing her strong belief that the presidency was not a lifetime position.

Initially, she named Ramon V. Mitra, Speaker of the Philippine House of Representatives who had been a friend of her husband, as her preferred candidate for the 1992 presidential elections. However, she later backtracked and instead supported the candidacy of General Fidel V. Ramos, who was her defense secretary and a key figure in the EDSA Revolution. Ramos had consistently stood by her government during the various coup attempts that were launched against her administration. Her sudden change of mind and withdrawal of support from Mitra drew criticism from her supporters in the liberal and social democratic sectors. Her decision also drew criticism from the Catholic Church, which questioned her support of Ramos due to him being Protestant. General Ramos won the 1992 elections with 23.58% of the total votes in a wide-open campaign.

On June 30, 1992, Corazon Aquino formally and peacefully handed over power to Fidel Ramos. On that day, Fidel V. Ramos was inaugurated as the twelfth president of the Philippines. After the inauguration, Aquino left the ceremony in a simple white Toyota Crown she had purchased, rather than the lavish government-issued Mercedes-Benz in which she and Ramos had ridden on the way to the ceremonies, to make the point that she was once again an ordinary citizen.

== Post-presidency (1992–2009) ==
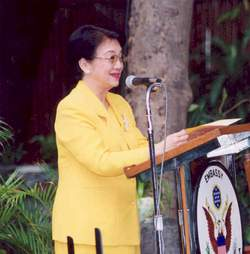
Corazon Aquino speaks before the 2003 Ninoy Aquino Award ceremony at the U.S. Embassy in Manila.

=== Domestic ===
During Aquino's retirement and stay as a private citizen, she remained active in the Philippine political scene. Aquino would voice her dissent to government actions and policies that she deemed threats to the democratic foundations of the country.

In 1995, Aquino advocated for the continuation of capital punishment (since reinstated by President Fidel V. Ramos in December 1993) amidst the failure of courts to prosecute the alleged rapists in Pangasinan. By late 2000, she had changed her mind, expressing opposition to the death penalty and support for President Joseph Estrada's attempt to repeal it.

In 1997, Aquino, together with Cardinal Jaime Sin, led a rally opposing President Ramos' attempt to extend his term through his proposal to amend the 1987 Constitution's restriction on presidential term limits. Ramos' proposed charter change would fail, leaving term limits and the presidential system in place.

During the 1998 Philippine presidential election, Aquino endorsed the candidacy of former police general and Manila Mayor Alfredo Lim who is the Liberal nominee for president. Lim would lose to Vice President Joseph Estrada, who won by a landslide. In 1999, Aquino and Cardinal Jaime Sin again worked together to oppose a second plan to amend the Constitution to remove term limits, this time under President Estrada. President Estrada stated that his plan to amend the Constitution was intended to lift provisions that 'restrict' economic activities and investments, and Estrada denied that it was an attempt to extend his stay in office. Estrada's proposed charter change would also fail.

In 2000, Aquino joined the mounting calls for Estrada to resign from office, amid a series of corruption scandals, including strong allegations of bribery charges and gambling kickbacks. Estrada was impeached by the House of Representatives in November 2000 but acquitted by the Senate in December, which in January 2001 led to the Second EDSA Revolution, which ousted Estrada. During the Second EDSA Revolution, Aquino enthusiastically supported the ascendancy of Vice President Gloria Macapagal Arroyo to the position of president. In the subsequent trial of Joseph Estrada, Estrada was acquitted of perjury but found guilty of plunder and sentenced to reclusion perpetua with the accessory penalties of perpetual disqualification from public office and forfeiture of ill-gotten wealth on September 12, 2007. Estrada was pardoned by President Macapagal-Arroyo on October 26, 2007.

In 2005, after a series of revelations and exposes that implicated President Gloria Macapagal Arroyo in rigging the 2004 presidential elections, Aquino called on Arroyo to resign in order to prevent bloodshed, violence and further political deterioration. Aquino once again led massive street-level demonstrations, this time demanding the resignation of President Arroyo.

During the 2007 senatorial elections, Aquino actively campaigned for her only son, Benigno "Noynoy" Aquino III, who went on to win his race. Less than a year after Corazon Aquino's death in 2009, Benigno Aquino III won the 2010 Philippine presidential election and served as the 15th president of the Philippines from 2010 to 2016.

In December 2008, Corazon Aquino publicly expressed regret for her participation in the 2001 Second EDSA Revolution, which installed Gloria Macapagal-Arroyo as president. She apologized to former President Joseph Estrada for the role she played in his ouster in 2001. Aquino's apology drew criticisms from numerous politicians. In June 2009, two months before her death, Aquino issued a public statement in which she strongly denounced and condemned the Arroyo administration's plans of amending the 1987 Constitution, calling it a "shameless abuse of power".

=== International ===
Shortly after leaving the presidency, Aquino traveled abroad, giving speeches and lectures on issues of democracy, development, human rights, and women empowerment. At the 1994 meeting of the UNESCO World Commission on Culture and Development in Manila, Aquino delivered a speech urging the unconditional release of Burmese democratic leader Aung San Suu Kyi from detention. She petitioned for the release of Aung San Suu Kyi.

Aquino was a member of the Council of Women World Leaders, an international organization of former and current female heads of state, from the group's inception in 1996 to her death.

In 1997, Aquino attended the wake and funeral of Saint Mother Teresa of Calcutta, whom she met during the latter's visit in Manila in 1989. In 2005, Aquino joined the international community in mourning the death of Pope John Paul II.

In 2002, Aquino became the first woman named to the Board of Governors at the Asian Institute of Management, a leading graduate business school and think tank in the Asia Pacific region. She served on the Board until 2006.

=== Charitable and social initiatives ===
After her term as president, Aquino was involved in several charitable activities and socio-economic initiatives. From 1992 until her death, Aquino was chairperson of the Benigno S. Aquino Jr. Foundation, which she set up in her husband's honor after his assassination in 1983. Aquino supported the Gawad Kalinga social housing project for the poor and homeless. In 2007, Aquino helped establish the PinoyME Foundation, a non-profit organization that aims to provide microfinancing programs and projects for the poor. Aquino also painted and would occasionally give away her paintings to friends and family or auction her paintings and donate the proceeds to charity. She never sold her art for her own profit.

== Illness and death ==
On March 24, 2008, Aquino's family announced that the former president had been diagnosed with colorectal cancer. Upon her being earlier informed by her doctors that she had only three months to live, she pursued medical treatment and chemotherapy. A series of healing Masses for Aquino, who was a devout Catholic, were held throughout the country for her recovery. In a public statement during one healing Mass on May 13, 2008, Aquino said that her blood tests indicated that she was responding well to treatment, although her hair and appetite loss were apparent.

By July 2009, Aquino was reported to be suffering from loss of appetite and in very serious condition. At that time she was confined to Makati Medical Center. It was later announced that Aquino and her family had decided to stop chemotherapy and other medical interventions for her.

Aquino died in the Makati Medical Center at 3:18 a.m. on August 1, 2009, due to cardiorespiratory arrest at the age of 76.

=== Wake and funeral ===
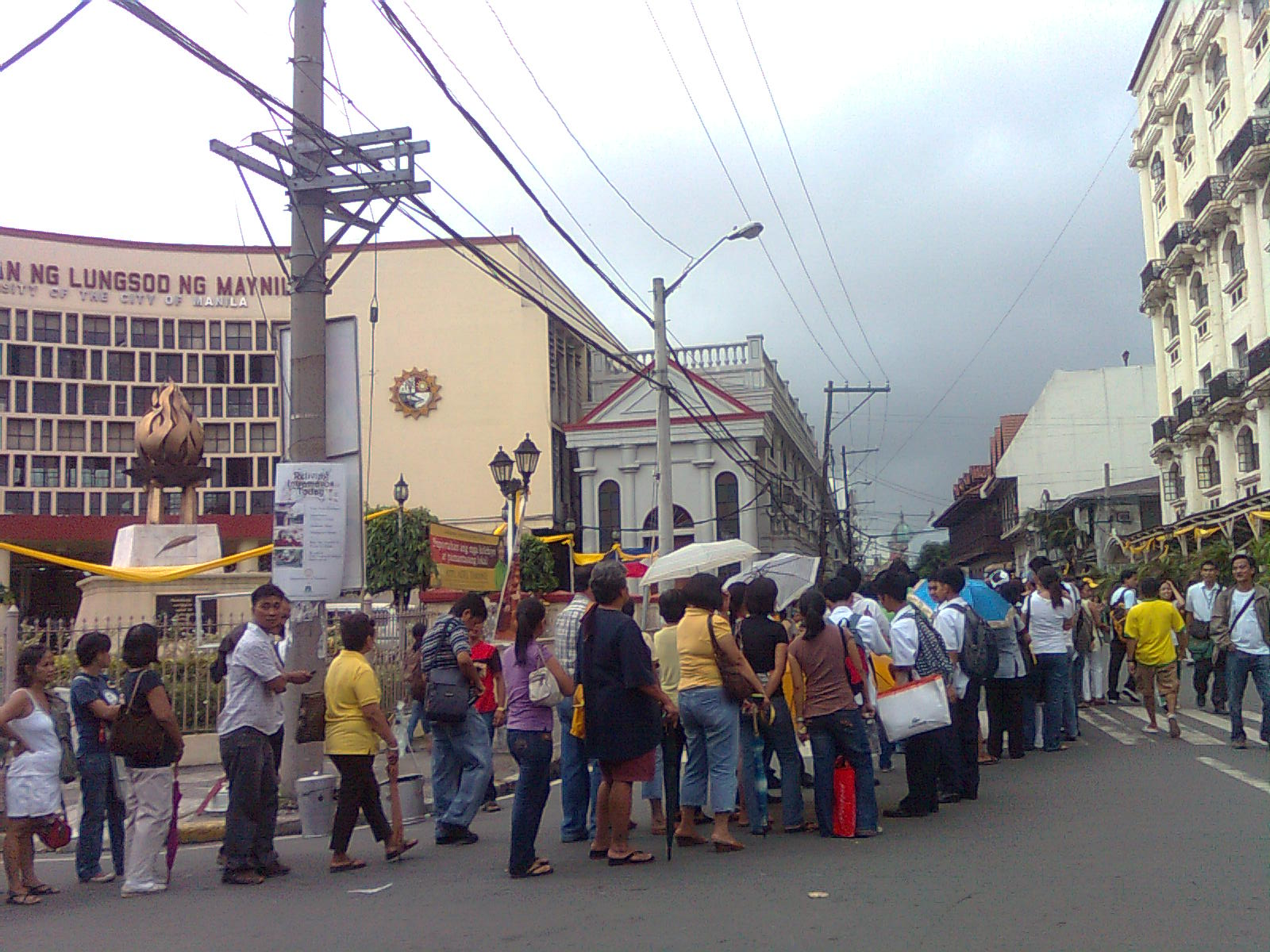
Queue for Aquino's wake in front of the Pamantasan ng Lungsod ng Maynila campus, which had opened its facilities for the mourners. The cross topping the dome of Manila Cathedral is visible in the upper right of the photo.

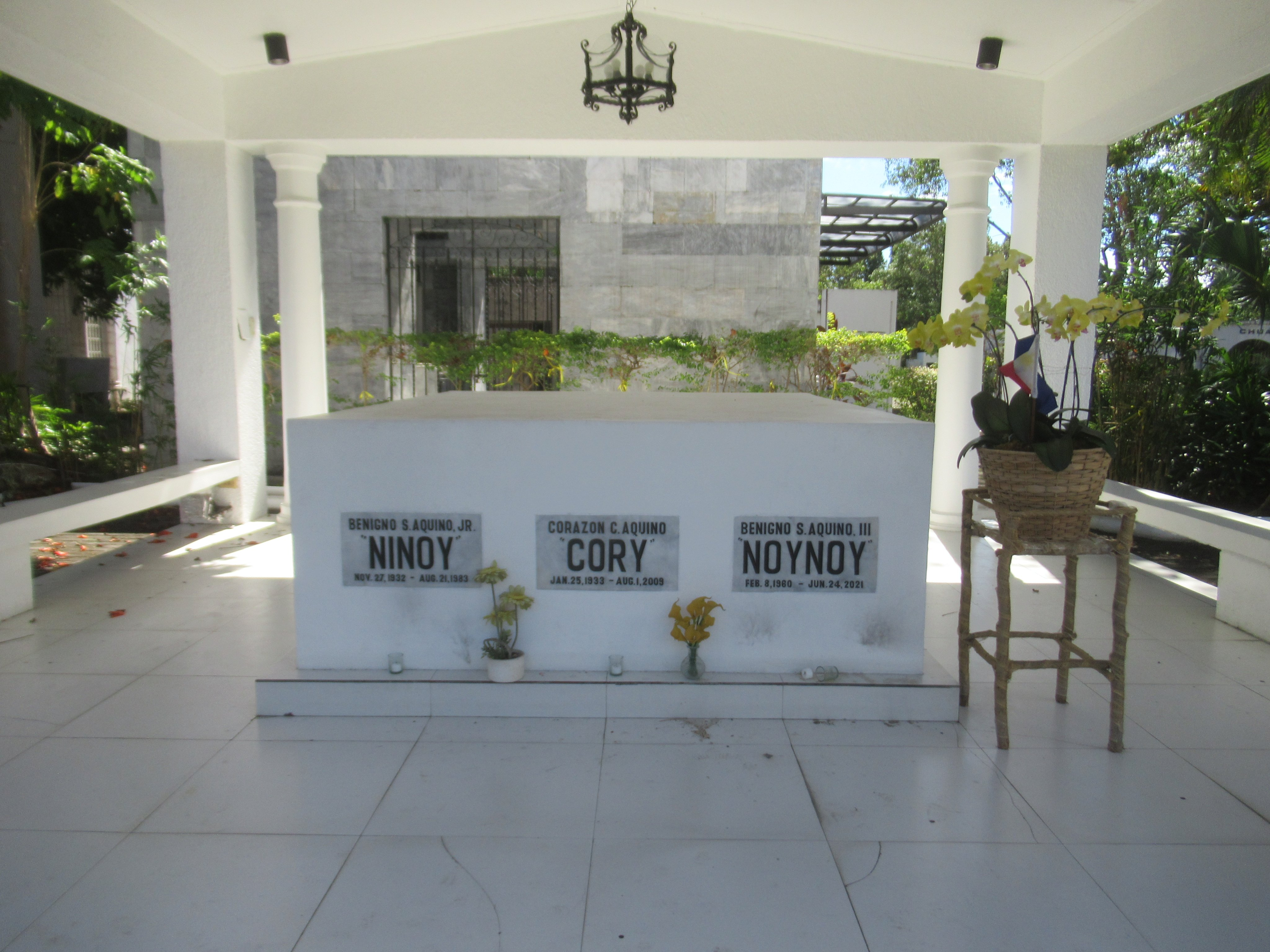
The shared tomb of Corazon, Ninoy, and Noynoy Aquino at the Manila Memorial Park in Parañaque, Philippines, photographed in 2025.

On the day of Aquino's death, President Gloria Macapagal Arroyo announced a 10-day mourning period for the former president and issued Administrative Order No. 269 detailing the necessary arrangements for a state funeral. Arroyo was on a state visit to the United States at the time of Aquino's death and returned to the Philippines on August 5, cutting her visit short to pay her last respects to Aquino. Aquino's children declined Arroyo's offer of a state funeral for their mother.

All churches in the Philippines celebrated requiem masses simultaneously throughout the country and all government offices flew the Philippine flag at half-mast. Hours after her death, Aquino's body lay in repose for public viewing at the La Salle Green Hills campus in Mandaluyong. On August 3, 2009, Aquino's body was transferred from La Salle Green Hills to the Manila Cathedral in Intramuros, during which hundreds of thousands of Filipinos lined the streets to view and escort the former leader's body. On the way to the cathedral, Aquino's funeral cortege passed along Ayala Avenue in Makati, stopping in front of the monument to her husband Ninoy, where throngs of mourners gathered and sang the patriotic protest anthem "Bayan Ko". Aquino's casket was brought inside the cathedral by mid-afternoon that day. Following her death, all Roman Catholic dioceses in the country held Requiem Masses.

On August 4, 2009, Bongbong Marcos and Imee Marcos, two prominent children of late former President Ferdinand Marcos, paid their last respects to Aquino in spite of the two families' longstanding feud. The Marcos siblings were received by Aquino's daughters María Elena, Aurora Corazon, and Victoria Elisa.

A final Requiem Mass was held on the morning of August 5, 2009, with Archbishop of Manila Cardinal Gaudencio Rosales, Bishop of Balanga Socrates B. Villegas, and other high-ranking clergymen concelebrating. Aquino's daughter Kris spoke on behalf of her family towards the end of the Mass. Aquino's flag-draped casket was escorted from the cathedral to Manila Memorial Park in Parañaque, where she was interred beside her husband in her family mausoleum. Aquino's funeral procession took more than eight hours to reach the burial site, as tens of thousands of civilians lined the route to pay their respects. Philippine Air Force UH-1 helicopters showered the procession with yellow confetti and ships docked at Manila's harbor blared their sirens to salute the late president.

=== Reaction ===
Both local and international leaders showed respect for Aquino's achievements in the process of democratization in the Philippines.

==== National reaction ====
Various politicians across the political spectrum expressed their grief and praise for the former Philippine leader. President Arroyo, once an ally of Aquino, remembered the sacrifices she made for the country and called her a "national treasure". Former President Estrada said that the country had lost its mother and guiding voice with her sudden death. He also described Aquino as the "Philippines' most loved woman". Although they were at one time political foes, Aquino and Estrada had reconciled and joined forces in opposing President Arroyo.

Communist Party of the Philippines founder Jose Maria Sison joined in mourning Aquino's death, saying his relationship with her was "exceptional". Former Senate President Juan Ponce Enrile, who had been Aquino's defense minister and later a fierce critic of Aquino, asked the public to pray for her eternal repose. Although former Aquino interior minister and Senate minority floor leader Aquilino Pimentel Jr. revealed that he had "mixed feelings" about Aquino's death, he also said that the country "shall be forever indebted to Cory for rallying the nation behind the campaign to topple dictatorial rule and restore democracy".

Filipino citizens throughout the country wore either yellow shirts or held masses to pay tribute to Aquino. Yellow ribbons, which were a symbol of support for Aquino after the 1986 election and during the People Power Revolution, were tied along major national roads as a sign of solidarity and support for Aquino and her grieving family. On popular social networking sites such as Facebook and Twitter, Filipinos posted yellow ribbons on their accounts as tribute. Following her death, Filipino Catholics called on the Church to have Aquino canonized and declared as a saint. Days after her funeral, the Bangko Sentral ng Pilipinas (BSP) announced that it supported calls to put the former president on the 500-Peso banknote alongside Benigno "Ninoy" Aquino Jr., her deceased husband. The bill had previously featured a portrait of only Benigno Aquino Jr. since 1987.

==== International reaction ====
Messages of sympathy were sent by various national heads of state and international leaders.

Pope Benedict XVI, in his letter to Archbishop Rosales, recalled Aquino's "courageous commitment to the freedom of the Filipino people, her firm rejection of violence and intolerance" and called her a woman of courage and faith.

U.S. President Barack Obama, through White House Press Secretary Robert Gibbs, said that "her courage, determination, and moral leadership are an inspiration to us all and exemplify the best in the Filipino nation". U.S. Secretary of State Hillary Clinton expressed sadness over the death of Aquino, to whom she had sent a personal letter of best wishes for recovery while she was still in hospital in July 2009. Clinton said that Aquino was "admired by the world for her extraordinary courage" in leading the fight against dictatorship.

South African President Jacob Zuma called Aquino "a great leader who set a shining example of peaceful transition to democracy in her country".

Queen Elizabeth II of the United Kingdom, through the British Ambassador in Manila, sent a message to the Filipino people which read: "I am saddened to hear of the death of Corazon 'Cory' Aquino the former president of the Republic of the Philippines". She also added, "I send my sincere condolences to her family and to the people of the Philippines. Signed, Elizabeth R".

Russian President Dmitry Medvedev stated in a telegram to President Arroyo that "the name of Corazon Aquino is associated with a period of profound reforms and the democratic transformation of Filipino society". Medvedev also lauded Aquino's sympathy to Russian people and her contribution to the improvement of Russian-Filipino relations.

Timor-Leste President José Ramos-Horta and Wan Azizah, wife of Malaysian opposition leader Anwar Ibrahim, came to the Philippines to express their sympathies and attend Aquino's funeral.

Soon after her 2010 release from her two-decade prison sentence, Aung San Suu Kyi of Myanmar publicly cited Aquino as one of her inspirations. She also expressed her good wishes for Aquino's son, then-incumbent president of the Philippines Benigno S. Aquino III.

== In popular culture ==
In 2008, a musical play about Aquino entitled Cory, the Musical was staged at the Meralco Theater. It was written and directed by Nestor Torre Jr. and starred Isay Alvarez as Aquino. The musical featured a libretto of 19 original songs composed by Lourdes Pimentel, wife of Senator Aquilino Pimentel Jr.

== Electoral history ==
Electoral history of Corazon Aquino
Year	Office	Party	Votes received				Result
Year	Office	Party	Total	%	P.	Swing	Result
1986	President of the Philippines	UNIDO	7,909,320	51.74%	1st	—N/a	Won

== Legacy and honors ==
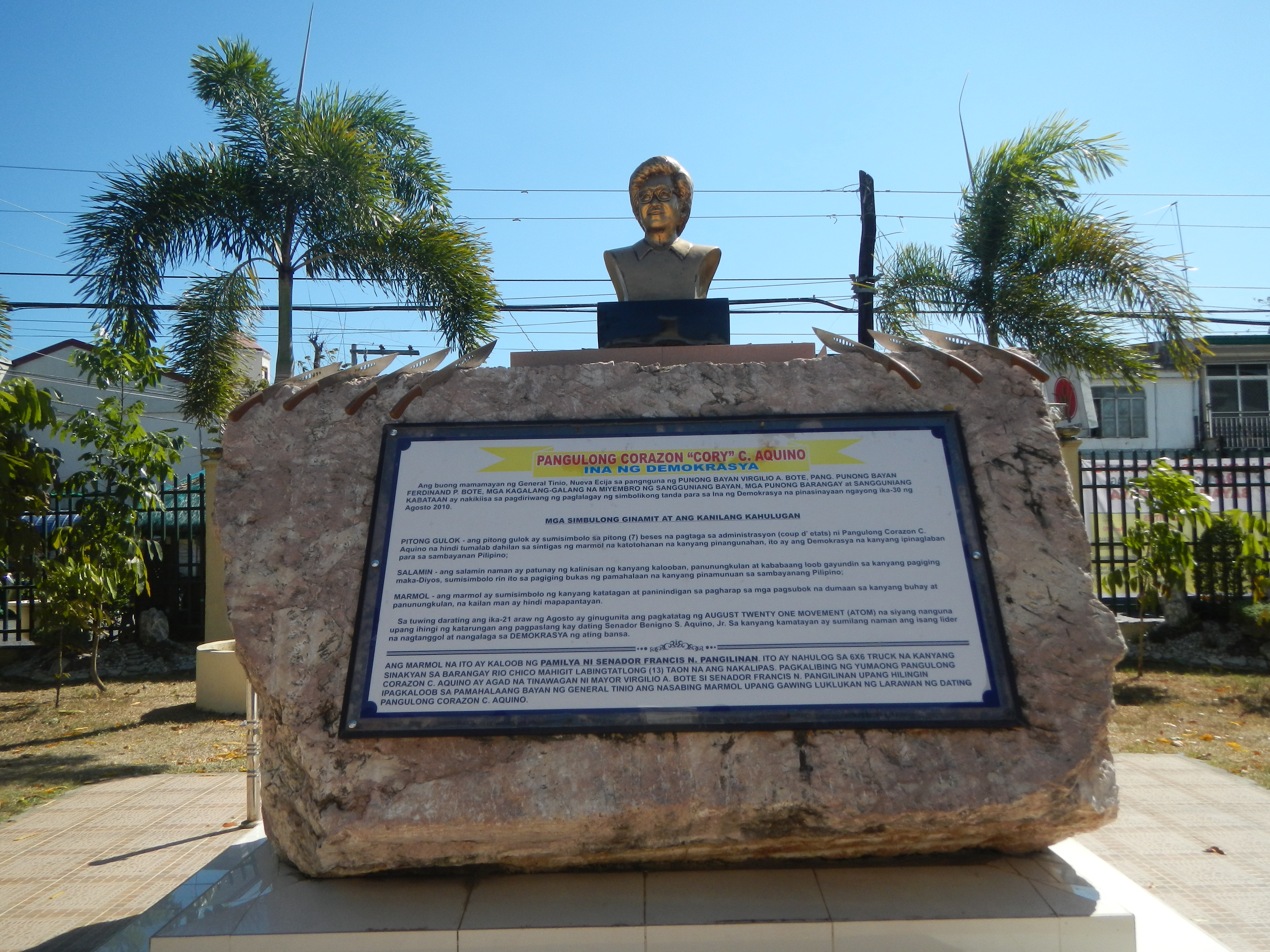
Cory Aquino memorial at General Tinio, Nueva Ecija

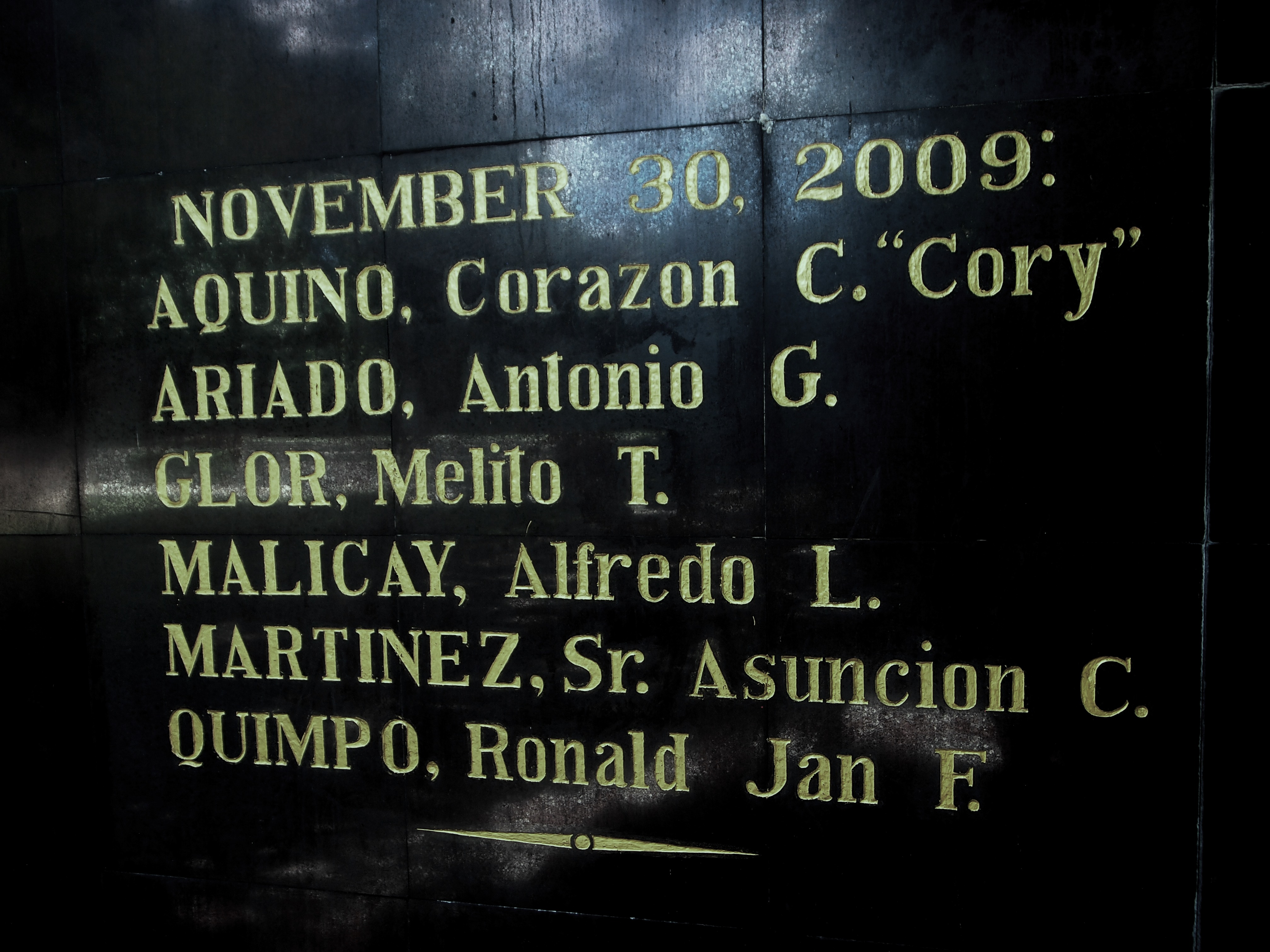
Detail of the Wall of Remembrance at the Bantayog ng mga Bayani, showing names from the 2009 batch of Bantayog Honorees, including that of Corazon Aquino

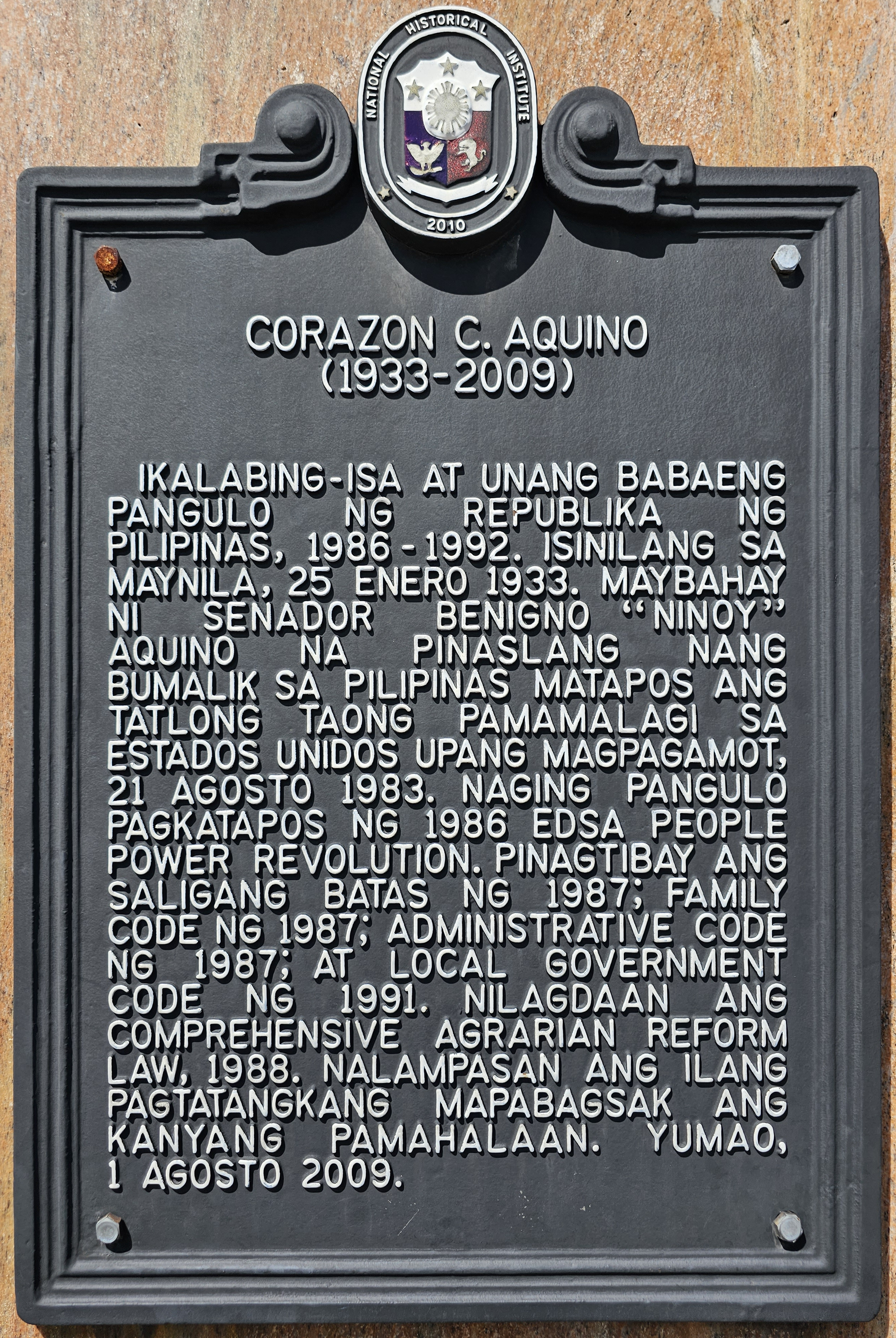
Corazon Aquino historical marker in Tarlac City issued by the NHI in 2010

After her peaceful accession to the presidency and the ousting of President Marcos, Aquino was named Time magazine's Woman of the Year in 1986. In August 1999, Aquino was chosen by Time as one of the 20 Most Influential Asians of the 20th century. Time also cited her as one of 65 great Asian Heroes in November 2006.

In 1994, Aquino was cited as one of 100 Women Who Shaped World History in a reference book written by Gail Meyer Rolka.

In 1996, she received the J. William Fulbright Prize for International Understanding from the Fulbright Association.

In 1998, she was awarded the Ramon Magsaysay Award in recognition of her role in peaceful revolution to attain democracy.

Since her death in 2009, the legacy of Corazon Aquino has prompted various namings of public landmarks and creations of memorials. Among these are as follows:

- From 2009 to the first print run of New Generation Currency Series in November 2010 in preparation for its release to the public on December 16, 2010, Presidents Gloria Macapagal Arroyo and Benigno Aquino III, and the Bangko Sentral ng Pilipinas (Central Bank of the Philippines) approved the production and release of newly designed 500-peso banknotes that feature both Senator Benigno "Ninoy" Aquino Jr. and Corazon Aquino. The New Design/BSP Series featured only Benigno "Ninoy" Aquino Jr. and had been in circulation from August 21, 1987, to January 3, 2018 (although Corazon's signature was featured on NDS 500-peso banknotes that were printed from the said date of August 1987 to June 30, 1992).
- On November 30, 2009, Aquino's name was enshrined at the Bantayog ng mga Bayani, a monument dedicated to individuals who fought for the restoration of Philippine democracy and opposed the Marcos dictatorship. Her husband Ninoy was among the first to be enshrined at the monument's Wall of Remembrance.
- On August 1, 2010, the first anniversary of her death, a 200 ft by 250 ft photo mosaic of Aquino was unveiled near the Quirino Grandstand at the Luneta Park in the presence of her son, President Benigno Aquino III, and her supporters. It was submitted to Guinness World Records to be certified as the largest photo mosaic in the world, and the record was later certified by the World Record Academy.
- On October 9, 2010, Manila Mayor Alfredo S. Lim inaugurated a public market in Baseco, Port Area known as the President Corazon C. Aquino Public Market.
- On February 13, 2013, the Corazon Aquino Democratic Space was launched at the De La Salle University, alongside the formal inauguration of the new Henry Sy, Sr. Hall.
- On July 28, 2014, the Republic Act No. 10663, which named a circumferential road in Iloilo City to President Corazon C. Aquino Avenue, was signed into law by President Benigno Aquino III.
- In 2015, the new Corazon C. Aquino Hospital in Barangay Biasong, Dipolog was opened to the public.
- On December 10, 2015, the Republic Act No. 10716, which renamed Batasan Hills High School (BHES) into "President Corazon C. Aquino Elementary School" in Batasan Hills, Quezon City, was signed into law by President Benigno Aquino III.
- On June 29, 2018, Republic Act No. 11045, which renamed the Kay Tikling-Antipolo-Teresa-Morong National Road to Corazon C. Aquino Avenue, was signed into law by President Rodrigo Duterte. Corazon C. Aquino Avenue is a road traversing from Taytay to Morong in Rizal (including the segment of Ortigas Avenue Extension from Taytay to Antipolo).

In 2018, Aquino, along with her late husband Ninoy Aquino and 126 other individuals were recognized by the Human Rights Victims Claims Board as a motu proprio human rights violations victim of the Ferdinand Marcos dictatorship.

== Awards and achievements ==
=== National ===
- Philippines
  - Chief Commander of the Philippine Legion of Honor
  - Grand Collar of the Order of Sikatuna

=== Foreign honors ===
- Argentina
  - Grand Cross of the Order of the Liberator General San Martín
- France
  - Grand Cross of the National Order of Merit
- Italy
  - Order of Merit of the Italian Republic, 1st class
- Japan
  - Grand Cordon of the Order of the Chrysanthemum
- Pakistan
  - Order of Pakistan
- Thailand
  - Knight Grand Order of Order of the White Elephant (declined)

=== Recognition ===
- 1986 Time Woman of the Year
- 1986 Eleanor Roosevelt Human Rights Award
- 1986 United Nations Silver Medal
- 1986 Canadian International Prize for Freedom
- 1986 International Democracy Award from the International Association of Political Consultants
- 1987 Prize For Freedom Award from Liberal International
- 1993 Special Peace Award from the Aurora Aragon Quezon Peace Awards Foundation and Concerned Women of the Philippines
- 1995 Path to Peace Award
- 1996 J. William Fulbright Prize for International Understanding from the U.S. Department of State
- 1998 Ramon Magsaysay Award for International Understanding
- 1998 Pearl S. Buck Award
- 1999 One of Time magazine's 20 Most Influential Asians of the 20th Century
- 2001 World Citizenship Award
- 2005 David Rockefeller Bridging Leadership Awards
- 2005 One of the World's Elite Women Who Make a Difference by the International Women's Forum Hall of Fame
- 2006 One of Time magazine's 65 Asian Heroes
- 2008 One of A Different View's 15 Champions of World Democracy
- EWC Asia Pacific Community Building Award
- Women's International Center International Leadership Living Legacy Award
- Martin Luther King Jr. Nonviolent Peace Prize
- United Nations Development Fund for Women Noel Foundation Life Award

=== Honorary doctorates ===
- Doctor of International Relations, honoris causa, from:
  - Boston University in Boston
  - Eastern University in St. David, Pennsylvania
  - Fordham University in New York
  - Waseda University in Tokyo
- Doctor of Civil Law, honoris causa, from:
  - Far Eastern University (59th Commencement Exercises, March 1987)
- Doctor of Laws, honoris causa, from:
  - University of the Philippines Diliman in Quezon City
  - University of Santo Tomas in Manila
  - University of Hong Kong in Hong Kong
- Doctor of Humane Letters, honoris causa, from:
  - Ateneo de Manila University
  - College of Mount Saint Vincent in New York
  - Xavier University – Ateneo de Cagayan in Cagayan de Oro
- Doctor of Humanities, honoris causa, from:
  - Bicol University (Posthumous) in Legazpi
  - San Beda College in Manila
  - Seattle University
  - Stonehill College in Easton, Massachusetts
  - University of Oregon
- Doctor of Public Administration, honoris causa, from:
  - Pamantasan ng Lungsod ng Maynila (University of the City of Manila)

== See also ==
- List of Filipino Nobel laureates and nominees
- Aquinoism

Political offices
Preceded by Ferdinand Marcos	President of the Philippines; February 25, 1986 – June 30, 1992	Succeeded by Fidel V. Ramos
Party political offices
First	UNIDO nominee for President of the Philippines; 1986	Party dissolved
First	PDP–Laban nominee for President of the Philippines; 1986	Vacant Title next held by Rodrigo Duterte
