= Zamboanga del Norte Medical Center =

Government hospital in Zamboanga del Norte, Philippines

- Provincial Government of Zamboanga del Norte
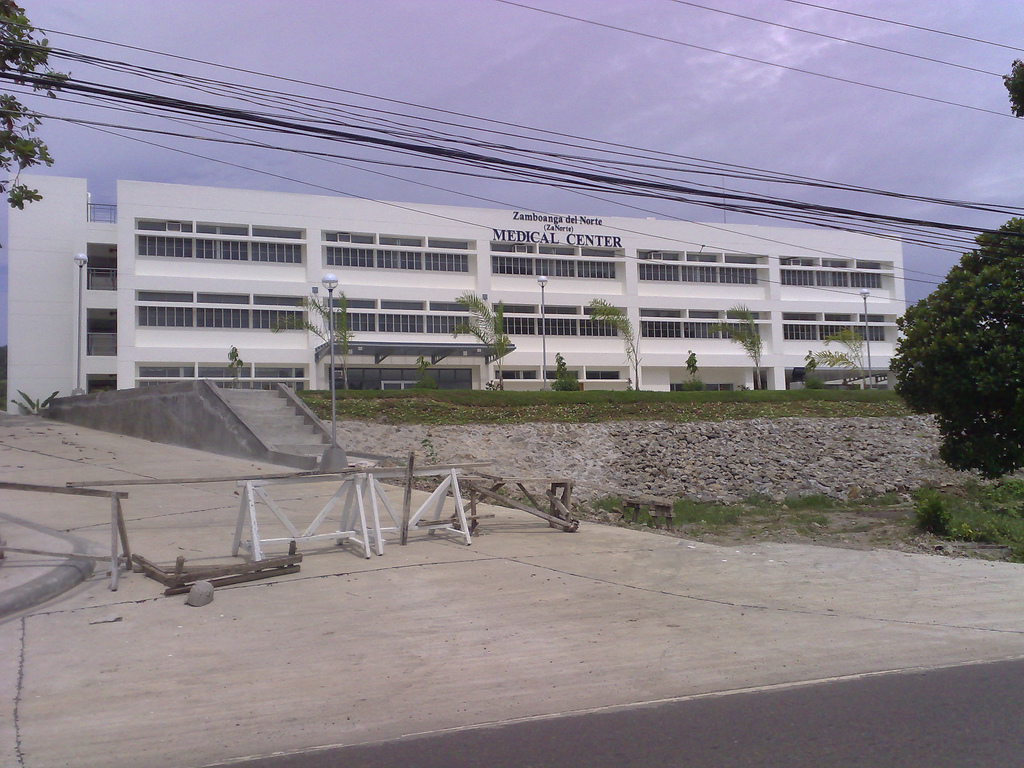

Geography
- Location: National Highway, Sicayab, Dipolog, Zamboanga Peninsula, Philippines
- Coordinates: 8°36′17″N 123°20′55″E

Organization
- Care system: Public, Philippine Health Insurance Corporation (PhilHealth) accredited
- Type: Tertiary

Services
- Standards: Philippine Department of Health
- Beds: 146

History
- Opened: September 17, 2007; 18 years ago

The Zamboanga del Norte Medical Center is a tertiary hospital located in Barangay Sicayab, Dipolog, Philippines. The center has an area of 3 hectares and consist of 3 stories and has a 146 bed-capacity. It also houses different private clinics of known physicians in the province with specialties in dermatology, ophthalmology, dentistry, urology, and gynecology.

== History ==
Zamboanga del Norte Medical Center opened in 2007 under the administration of Governor Rolando E. Yebes.

On July 29, 2015, hundreds of children in the area were brought to ZNMC (with some transferred to Corazon C. Aquino Hospital which was operating softly from its recent opening) after taking deworming pills provided by the Department of Health.

In October 2020, some facilities of ZNMC were closed after three of its employees were tested positive for COVID-19.

== Malasakit Center ==
On March 11, 2019, Malasakit Center Dipolog was opened in ZNMC. This move, together with Malasakit Center Dapitan in Dr. Jose Rizal Memorial Hospital in Dapitan which opened on the same day, makes Zamboanga del Norte the first and only province with two Malasakit Centers in the Philippines.

== See also ==
- Corazon C. Aquino Hospital
- List of hospitals in the Philippines
