= List of ambassadors of Russia to the Philippines =

Ambassador of the Russian Federation to the Republic of the Philippines
- Emblem of the Russian Foreign Ministry

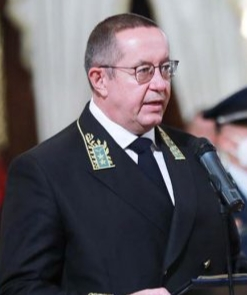
- Incumbent; Marat Pavlov since 21 September 2020
- Ministry of Foreign Affairs; Embassy of Russia in Manila
- Style: His Excellency
- Reports to: Minister of Foreign Affairs
- Seat: Manila
- Appointer: President of Russia
- Term length: At the pleasure of the president
- Website: Embassy of Russia in the Philippines

The ambassador extraordinary and plenipotentiary of the Russian Federation to the Republic of the Philippines is the official representative of the president and the government of the Russian Federation to the president and the government of the Philippines.

The ambassador and his staff work at large in the Embassy of Russia in Manila. The post of Russian ambassador to the Philippines is currently held by Marat Pavlov, incumbent since 21 September 2020. The ambassador to the Philippines is also the non-resident ambassador to Palau, and the Marshall Islands.

== History of diplomatic relations ==
The Russian Empire's far eastern expansion during the nineteenth century brought it into contact with the countries of Southeast Asia, which provided a source of food and raw materials for the new territories, which could not be easily supplied from within the empire. Peter Dobell, an Irish-born American businessman living in the region, arranged for trade relations with the Russian Far East, and was in 1817 appointed the Russian consul general in Manila under the name Pyotr Vasilievich Dobel. He acted as an unofficial representative of the Russian government, a role later fulfilled largely by French merchants prior to the 1917 revolution. Following the establishment of Soviet rule, links were initially maintained via the Communist International, but gradually died out in the face of official Philippine opposition. Following Philippine independence in 1946, the national government continued the previous policy of not establishing relations with socialist countries. This changed in 1965 with the new President, Ferdinand Marcos, who sought links with socialist countries as new markets for exports.

Trade and political links were developed and strengthened during the 1960s and 1970s, and in 1976, following Ferdinand Marcos's first state visit to the USSR on 2 June 1976, a communiqué was issued, establishing diplomatic relations. Both countries began to exchange ambassadors from 1977 onwards. With the dissolution of the Soviet Union in 1991, the Philippines recognised the Russian Federation as its successor state on 28 December 1991. The incumbent Soviet ambassador, Vitaly Kuchuk, continued to serve as representative of Russia until 1996.

The ambassador to the Philippines had concurrent accreditation to Micronesia between 2014 and 2020. Micronesia severed diplomatic relations with Russia in 2022 in protest against the Russian invasion of Ukraine.

== List of representatives (1977–present) ==
=== Soviet Union to the Philippines (1977–1991) ===
Name	Title	Appointment	Termination	Notes
Valerian Mikhailov	Ambassador	22 October 1977	21 July 1981	Presentation of credentials on 5 January 1978
Yuri Sholmov	Ambassador	21 July 1981	23 December 1985	Presentation of credentials on 29 September 1981
Vadim Shabalin	Ambassador	23 December 1985	12 November 1987	
Oleg Sokolov	Ambassador	12 November 1987	30 October 1990	
Vitaly Kuchuk	Ambassador	6 December 1990	25 December 1991	

=== Russian Federation to the Philippines (1991–present) ===
Name	Title	Appointment	Termination	Notes
Vitaly Kuchuk	Ambassador	25 December 1991	13 February 1996	
Anatoly Khmelnitsky	Ambassador	13 February 1996	16 July 2002	
Anatoly Nebogatov	Ambassador	16 July 2002	8 January 2007	
Vitaly Vorobyov	Ambassador	8 January 2007	27 August 2010	
Nikolai Kudashev	Ambassador	27 August 2010	2 March 2015	Presentation of credentials on October 20 2010
Igor Khovayev	Ambassador	2 March 2015	19 September 2020	Presentation of credentials on 8 June 2015
Marat Pavlov	Ambassador	21 September 2020		Presentation of credentials on 2 December 2020
