= Philippines–Soviet Union relations =

- Philippines: Soviet Union

Philippines–Soviet Union relations refers to the former bilateral ties between the Republic of the Philippines and the now-defunct Union of Soviet Socialist Republics.

Efforts to strengthen diplomatic relations between the two countries were hindered by mutual distrust between them, with the Philippines being a key ally of the United States, the Soviet Union's main rival in the Cold War. Anti-communist sentiment among many Filipinos was also an obstacle.

== Overview ==
Since 1967, the Philippines had become more active in improving ties with Eastern Bloc countries. Even as the Philippines began to soften its ties with the Soviet Union and its allies, it remained cautious and suspicious toward the Soviet Union approaching the union with a "backwards-forward" style of diplomacy. The Philippines was wary of the Soviet Union because of ideological differences and past links to underground movements.

The Soviet Union also mistrusted the Philippines because of its strong ties with the United States. Any development that would lead towards the erosion of the ties between the Philippines and the United States was welcomed by the Soviet Union. The Soviet Union itself admitted that those developments would be limited.

== History ==
It was 20 years after the formation of the Soviet Union before the Philippines consider establishing ties between the two countries. Salvador P. Lopez proposed a review of relations with the Soviet Union and its allies, reduced dependence on the United States and an Asian policy that would take into account China's emergence as a power of Asia. The administration of Diosdado Macapagal rejected these proposals.

During the presidency of Filipino President Ferdinand Marcos, relations between the Philippines and the Soviet Union reached their peak. In a Foreign Policy statement released in January 1967, Marcos acknowledged the need to pursue the establishment of Philippine ties with the Soviet Union and the People's Republic of China more vigorously. Also in the same month, Foreign Affairs secretary Narciso Ramos spoke of possible relaxation on the ban against trading with socialist states. As part of Marcos' foreign policy, the Philippines sent missions to the Soviet Union, Poland, Czechoslovakia, Romania, East Germany and Bulgaria. Formal diplomatic relations between the two countries were established on June 2, 1976.

== Economic ties ==
The Soviet Union composed of one to two per cent of the Philippines' total trade. The two states granted each other most favoured nation status on customs duties, internal taxes and the issuance of import and export taxes.

The most exported products from the Philippines were food products, manufactured goods and alcohol products such as beer, rum and gin, while the Soviet Union exported industrial equipment, minerals, tools, machinery, coal and oil to the Philippines.

During the 1972–1984 period the Philippines recorded a favourable balance of trade with the Soviet Union, but from 1985 onwards the Philippines exports of traditional products to the Soviet Union were insufficient.

A feasibility study was conducted in 1982 as part of a joint venture of the Philippines and the Soviet Union to construct a one million ton per year cement plant. It would significantly add to the current annual output level of four to four and a half million tons of cement the Philippines exported. The project was discontinued because of financial constraints. It would have been the first Soviet industrial project in the Philippines.

== Factors affecting bilateral relations ==
The Philippines has long been plagued by poverty and agrarian issues, which led to the rise of the country's communist and secessionist movements. The Philippines is a Catholic majority nation which is an important factor. The Catholic Church is opposed to Communism which it associates with atheism, violence and dictatorship. The Philippine government was also hostile to atheists, and up until 1986 atheism was a crime punishable by 10 years in jail. The United States and Japan's economic aid to Southeast Asian nations, complicates relations. The Red Scare and the intensified insurgency made the Filipinos suspicious towards the Soviet Union.

The Soviet Union remained distrustful of the Philippines because of its ties with the United States. The Philippines had assisted the United States in both the Korean War and the Vietnam War. The Soviet Union had been involved in both wars.

=== Alleged Soviet sponsored terrorism ===
Reports of the New People's Army and radical labour groups being sponsored by the Soviet Union circulated. The Philippine Senate urged an investigation of Soviet aid to labour groups and insurgents, and the sighting of submarines allegedly belonging to the Soviet Union. The Soviet Ambassador to Manila, Vadim Shabalin, denied Soviet involvement and such allegations were "flagrantly distorting" to the Soviet Union's foreign policy towards the Philippines.

== See also ==
- Philippines–Russia relations
