= Marat Pavlov =

Russian diplomat

- Марат Павлов
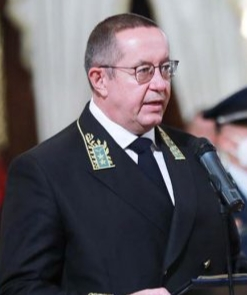
- Pavlov in 2020

Russian Ambassador to the Philippines
- Incumbent
- Assumed office September 2020
- Appointed by: Vladimir Putin
- Preceded by: Igor Khovayev

Personal details
- Born: November 12, 1955 (age 70)
- Education: Moscow State Institute of International Relations

Marat Ignatyevich Pavlov (born November 12, 1955) is a Russian diplomat currently serving as the Russian ambassador to the Philippines since 2020.

== Career ==
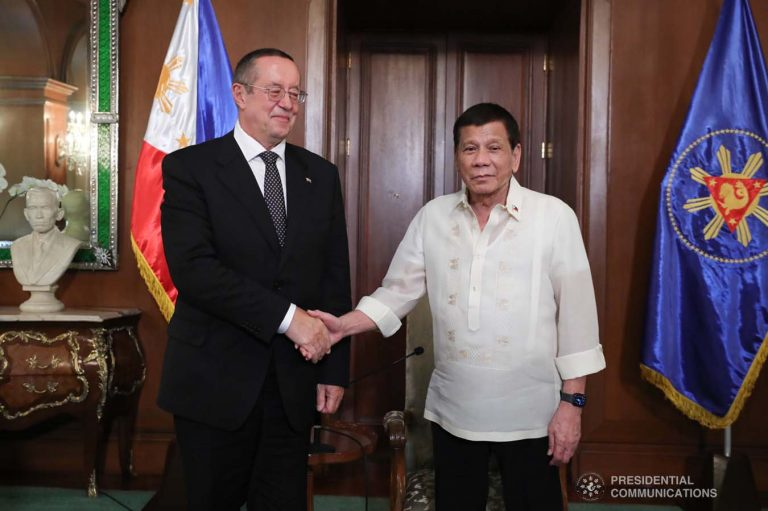
Pavlov with Philippine President Rodrigo Duterte, June 2022

Born in 1955, Pavlov studied at Moscow State Institute of International Relations in 1978. That same year, he entered foreign service. In 1991, he graduated at the Diplomatic Academy of the Ministry of Foreign Affairs. From 2007 to 2013, he took the role of counselor at the Russian Embassy in Italy. From 2013 to 2015, he became Chief Counselor of the Fourth European Department at the Ministry of Foreign Affairs. From 2015 to 2020, Pavlov became Russian consul general in Genova, Italy. In 2020, Pavlov was appointed as Russian ambassador to the Philippines.

== Political positions ==
=== 2022 Russian invasion of Ukraine ===
Amid the 2022 Russian invasion of Ukraine, Pavlov supported the Duterte administration's neutral stance on the conflict calling it as a "wise position". In March 2022, he published an opinion piece in The Philippine Star criticizing Western and Philippine media reporting on the war in Ukraine and describing it as "fake news". The opinion piece received backlash from European ambassadors in the Philippines. European Union ambassador to the Philippines Luc Veron stated: "Plain truth is that Russia has invaded Ukraine and [is] attacking its population. Russia disregards sovereignty and territory." Pavlov's opinion piece was later removed by the newspaper.

== Selected publications ==
- Pavlov, Marat (February 9, 2026). "Diplomacy in a changing world: Russia's vision of cooperation and dialogue". BusinessMirror.
- Pavlov, Marat (March 17, 2022). "The situation in Ukraine". The Philippine Star. (Opinion piece removed)
