= Igor Bailen =

Filipino career diplomat

Igor G. Bailen
- Born: Pasay, Metro Manila, Philippines
- Education: University of the Philippines Diliman (BA & LLB), American University (LL.M)
- Occupations: Diplomat; Lawyer; Ambassador
- Awards: Gawad Mabini rank of Grand Cross (GCrM) - Dakilang Kamanong

Igor Garlit Bailen (born in Quezon City, Philippines) is a Filipino career diplomat.

== Early life and education ==
Igor Garlit Bailen was born in Quezon City, Philippines to Josefina Garlit Bailen and Professor Jerome B. Bailen. He attended the University of the Philippines Integrated School.

He obtained a Bachelor of Arts degree in Political Science (cum laude) from the University of the Philippines Diliman. He graduated from the University of the Philippines College of Law and was admitted to the Philippine Bar in 1998.

He obtained a Master of Laws degree (International Legal Studies) from the American University in Washington DC as a Fulbright Scholar.

== Career ==
At the Department of Foreign Affairs, Ambassador Bailen held the positions of Assistant Secretary of the Office of Treaties and Legal Affairs and concurrently as Assistant Secretary of the Maritime and Ocean Affairs Office.

As a junior diplomat, he was Director of the Office of United Nations and other International Organizations, as well as Special Assistant to the Undersecretary for Administration, and Secretary of the Board of Foreign Service Administration.

In the foreign service, he was the Minister and Legal Adviser (Sixth Committee) at the Philippine Permanent Mission to the United Nations in New York. He was also Consul at the Philippine Embassy in Paris, where he was later the Deputy Permanent Delegate of the Philippines to UNESCO.

He currently serves as the Ambassador Extraordinary and Plenipotentiary of the Philippines to Russia. He also serves as non-resident ambassador to Armenia, Belarus, and Kazakhstan.
