= Embassy of the Philippines, Oslo =

Diplomatic mission of the Philippines in Norway

Embassy of the Philippines, Oslo Pasuguan ng Pilipinas sa Oslo Filippinenes ambassade i Oslo

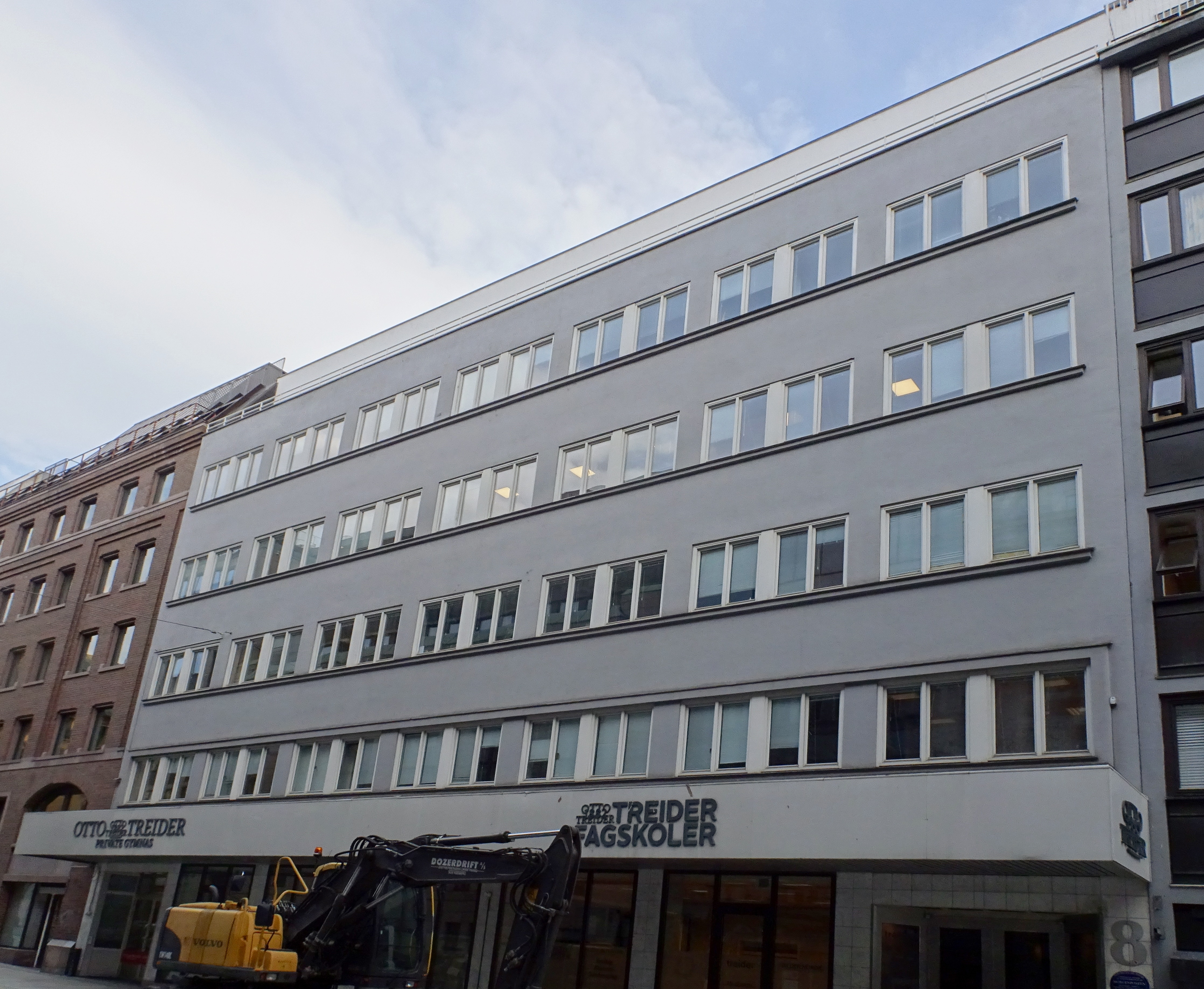
- Location: Oslo
- Address: Nedre Vollgate 8
- Coordinates: 59°54′40.5″N 10°44′19.3″E
- Ambassador: Enrico T. Fos
- Website: oslope.dfa.gov.ph

The Embassy of the Philippines in Oslo is the diplomatic mission of the Republic of the Philippines to the Kingdom of Norway, opened in 2007. It is located at Nedre Vollgate 8 in central Oslo, near Kontraskjæret and the Akershus Fortress.

== History ==
The Philippines did not initially open a resident mission in Norway when diplomatic relations between the two countries were established on March 2, 1948. Relations were conducted through the Philippine Embassy in London until June 1986, when jurisdiction over Norway was transferred to the then-newly opened Philippine Embassy in Stockholm.

Although Norway had maintained a resident mission in the Philippines since 1967, when it opened its embassy in Manila, the Philippines would not open a resident embassy in Oslo until much later. The Philippine Embassy in Oslo would formally open on April 30, 2007 – at the time, the country's 86th mission abroad – with Victoria S. Bataclan becoming the country's first resident ambassador to Norway. In addition to Norway, the embassy also assumed jurisdiction over Denmark, which had also been under the jurisdiction of the Stockholm mission, and Iceland.

After a massive expansion of the Philippines' diplomatic presence abroad during the presidency of Gloria Macapagal Arroyo, of which the embassy's opening was a part, in 2010 Senator Franklin Drilon questioned the need for embassies in countries with small Filipino communities, including several countries in Europe, and called for a review of the Philippines' diplomatic presence worldwide. This would lead to the closure of ten posts under Arroyo's successor, Benigno Aquino III, and ultimately to the closure of the embassies in Stockholm and Helsinki on October 31, 2012. At the time, the Stockholm mission exercised jurisdiction over Estonia, Latvia and Lithuania, which were subsequently transferred to the Philippine Embassy in Warsaw. Sweden proper was subsequently placed under the jurisdiction of the Oslo mission, which conducted monthly consular outreach visits, along with Finland. With the closures, the embassy's jurisdiction covered all the Nordic states.

The closures were reversed under Aquino's successors, with his immediate successor Rodrigo Duterte opening the Philippine Embassy in Copenhagen on January 14, 2019. Later that year, the Philippine government had begun considering reopening a resident mission in Sweden owing to deepening relations between the two countries, and Foreign Affairs Secretary Teodoro Locsin Jr. announced that the Stockholm mission would reopen as part of the Duterte administration's push to expand the country's international presence. After a landing team arrived to set up the new embassy, the Philippine Embassy in Stockholm was reopened to the public on May 15, 2020, which at the time also assumed jurisdiction over Finland. A separate Philippine Embassy in Helsinki, meanwhile, reopened on October 4, 2024 during the administration of Duterte's successor, Bongbong Marcos.

== Chancery ==
The chancery of the Philippine Embassy in Oslo was initially located in a room on the 11th floor of the Radisson SAS Plaza Hotel. On August 6, 2007, the first permanent chancery on Nedre Vollgate 4 was inaugurated by Ambassador Bataclan, with other embassy officials and members of the Filipino community in Norway in attendance. Notably, on June 25, 2015 the chancery had to be evacuated after a gas leak triggered a fire alarm.

On March 1, 2023, the embassy moved to a new chancery next door on the fourth floor of Nedre Vollgate 8. It was formally inaugurated on April 21, 2023 by Foreign Affairs Undersecretary Ma. Theresa P. Lazaro, with Philippine and Norwegian officials and the local community in attendance.

== Staff and activities ==
The Philippine Embassy in Oslo is currently headed by Ambassador Enrico T. Fos, who was appointed to the position by President Duterte on July 27, 2021. Prior to becoming Ambassador, Fos, a distinguished career diplomat who was conferred the Gawad Mabini twice, had most recently served as Assistant Secretary for Migrant Workers' Affairs. His appointment was confirmed by the Commission on Appointments on September 1, 2021, and he presented his credentials to King Harald V on December 2, 2021.

With the embassy's opening spurred by growing diplomatic and trade relations between the two countries, as well as the growing number of Filipinos in Norway, many of the embassy's activities involve those areas. Economically, these include encouraging imports of Philippine coffee in Norway along with similar efforts in other Scandinavian countries, and promoting opportunities for Norwegian companies to help develop the Philippines' renewable energy and business process outsourcing industries, while diplomatically, the embassy serves as an important post for members of the Communist Party of the Philippines and its affiliated organizations, as Norway helps facilitate talks between the two sides and CPP leaders are required to register with the mission. Meanwhile, the embassy has also been involved in activities to promote cultural exchanges between the Philippines and Norway, such as hosting a five-course dinner and cooking course for invited guests.

The embassy is also involved in activities beyond Oslo. It maintains honorary consulates in Stavanger and Reykjavík, hosts regular consular outreach activities in territories under its jurisdiction, and in the Philippines, the embassy also periodically warns against spurious job opportunities in Norway, including those spread through unlicensed Norwegian language schools.

== See also ==
- Norway–Philippines relations
- List of diplomatic missions of the Philippines
- Filipinos in Norway
