= Embassy of the Philippines, Copenhagen =

Diplomatic mission of the Philippines in Denmark

Embassy of the Philippines, Copenhagen Pasuguan ng Pilipinas sa Kopenhague Filippinernes ambassade i København

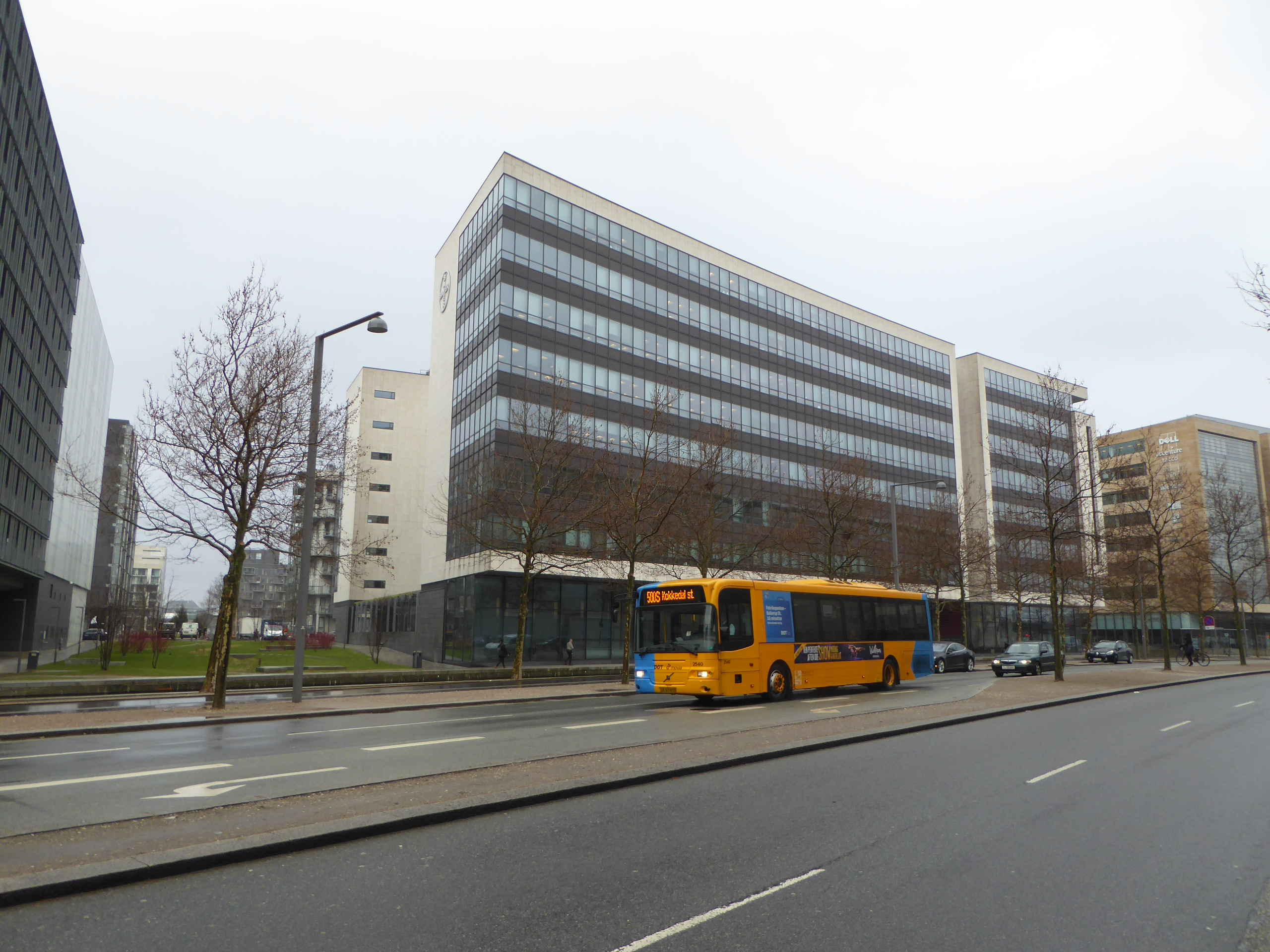
- Location: Copenhagen
- Address: Arne Jacobsens Allé 13
- Coordinates: 55°37′54.6″N 12°34′36.8″E
- Ambassador: Pablito A. Mendoza
- Website: copenhagenpe.dfa.gov.ph

The Embassy of the Philippines in Copenhagen is the diplomatic mission of the Republic of the Philippines to the Kingdom of Denmark. Opened in 2019, it is located on the first floor of 13 Arne Jacobsen Avenue (Danish: Arne Jacobsens Allé 13) in the Ørestad district of Copenhagen, near Ørestad Station and opposite the Field's shopping mall.

== History ==
When diplomatic relations were established on September 28, 1946, the Philippines did not open a resident mission in Denmark. Relations were conducted through the Philippine embassy in London until 1979, when jurisdiction over Denmark was transferred to the newly opened Philippine embassy in Stockholm. In 2007, jurisdiction was transferred again to the newly opened Philippine embassy in Oslo, with diplomatic relations conducted through an honorary consulate in Copenhagen.

Although Denmark had maintained from time to time a resident mission in the Philippines, most recently reopening its embassy in Manila in 2014 after closing it twelve years earlier, the Philippines would not open a resident embassy until five years later, with Danish ambassador Jan Top Christensen playing a key role in convincing the Philippine government to do so. The Philippine embassy in Copenhagen would formally open on January 14, 2019, assuming consular functions from the previously established honorary consulate and the embassy in Oslo and receiving its first consular applicant later that day.

== Chancery ==
The chancery of the Philippine Embassy in Copenhagen was first located in Ydre Østerbro in northern Copenhagen, initially operating from a temporary office until November 3, 2019, when it relocated to permanent offices in Ørestad.

The Philippine embassy is the first embassy in the district, with other diplomatic missions being closer to the city center. Colliers International advised the embassy on finding locations for the permanent chancery, which ultimately decided on 750 square meters (8,100 sq ft) of office space in a building owned by the Norwegian Kommunal Landspensjonskasse (KLP). Selected for its proximity to transport links and other amenities, the embassy rents its space from KLP Eiendom, the company that manages KLP's real-estate portfolio.

== Staff and activities ==
The Philippine Embassy in Copenhagen is headed by Ambassador Pablito A. Mendoza, who was appointed to the position by President Bongbong Marcos on June 9, 2025. Prior to his appointment as ambassador, Mendoza, a career diplomat, served as consul general and deputy chief of mission at the Philippine Embassy in Brussels. His appointment was confirmed by the Commission on Appointments on September 3, 2025, and he presented his credentials to King Frederik X on May 12, 2026. The mission has fifteen other staff members.

Many of its activities center around strengthening the deepening economic ties between the Philippines and Denmark, which were instrumental in the mission's opening. These include encouraging imports of Philippine coffee in Denmark and other Scandinavian countries, hosting networking events to connect Danish small and medium-sized enterprises to economic opportunities in the Philippines and supporting Filipino-run businesses. The embassy has also organized seminars for the Filipino community and coordinated with Danish companies, such as Maersk, that employ many Filipinos.

In addition to its activities in Copenhagen, the embassy has conducted consular outreach activities in other parts of Denmark, including a 2019 event in Greenland – the first outreach activity in the territory in nearly two years.

== See also ==
- Denmark–Philippines relations
- List of diplomatic missions of the Philippines
