= List of international presidential trips made by Karol Nawrocki =

This is a list of all international presidential trips made by Karol Nawrocki, the 7th President of Poland during his presidency which began on 6 August 2025.

== Summary ==
The number of visits per country where President Nawrocki travelled during his presidency are:

- One: Croatia, Czech Republic, Estonia, Finland, France, Germany, Philippines, Romania, Slovakia, Switzerland, United Kingdom
- Two: Hungary, Latvia, Turkey, Vatican City
- Three: Lithuania, Italy
- Four: United States

== 2025 ==
| | Country | Areas visited | Dates | Details | Image |
|---|---|---|---|---|---|
| 1 | United States | Washington, D.C. | 3 September | Met with President Donald Trump at the White House, welcomed by F-35 jets doing a flyover in honour of a F-16 polish fighter pilot who crashed at the Radom Air Show. The visit included discussions regarding economic, military and energy issues. | |
| 2 | Italy | Rome | 4-5 September | Met with Prime Minister Giorgia Meloni at Chigi Palace and later with President Sergio Mattarella at the Quirinal Palace, in these meetings Nawrocki discussed the EU–Mercosur Association Agreement and the aggressive policies of Russia. | |
| 2 | Vatican City | Vatican City | 5 September | Met with Pope Pope Leo XIV in the Apostolic Palace and also met with Vatican Secretary of State Pietro Parolin. He also laid flowers at the grave of Pope John Paul II | |
| 3 | Lithuania | Vilnius | 8 September | Visited Rasos Cemetery and met with polish people living in Lithuania. Met with President Gitanas Nausėda, Speaker of the Seimas Saulius Skvernelis and Prime Minister designate Inga Ruginienė. The discussions revolved around joint-cooperation in countering threats posed by drones and economic cooperation. | |
| 3 | Finland | Helsinki | 9 September | Met with President Alexander Stubb at the Presidential Palace and also met the Speaker of the Parliament Jussi Halla-aho. Discussions which were undertaken were about regional security and economic relations. Nawrocki also visited the Merihaka Civil Defence and also laid a wreath at the Hietaniemi Cemetery. | |
| 4 | Germany | Berlin | 16 September | Met with President Frank-Walter Steinmeier and Chancellor Friedrich Merz. Talks were centred around security issues, German war reparations, the eastern flank of NATO and Russian aggression in Ukraine. | |
| 4 | France | Paris | 16 September | Met with President Emmanuel Macron at Élysée Palace. The discussions were about European climate, migration policies and security. | |
| 5 | United States | New York | 21–24 September | Attended the 80th session of the United Nations General Assembly. Met with US President Donald Trump, Lithuanian President Gitanas Nausėda, Latvian President Edgars Rinkēvičs, Estonian President Alar Karis and UN Secretary General António Guterres He also met with Alphabet and Google top representatives. | |
| 6 | Estonia | Tallinn | 9-10 October | Attended the Arraiolos Group summit and there were talks about regional security and on how to use newer technologies for civil and military use. He also later met alone with President Alar Karis and Speaker of the Riigikogu Lauri Hussar. | |
| 7 | Lithuania | Kalvarija | 20 October | Nawrocki attended the opening of the Lithuanian part of Via Baltica with President Gitanas Nausėda. | |
| 8 | Slovakia | Bratislava | 4–5 November | Met with President Peter Pellegrini, Prime Minister Robert Fico and Speaker of the Parliament Richard Raši. The talks conducted were about energy, infrastructure, security and the building of the Via Carpathia. They also discussed issues surrounding migration policy and laid down wreaths at the Gate of Freedom. | |
| 9 | Czech Republic | Prague | 24 November | Met with President Petr Pavel and discussed regional security as well as issues surrounding the Three Seas Initiative, Visegrád Group and economic relations. Afterwards, he gave a lecture at Charles University about the importance of Central Europe within the European Union. | |
| 10 | Hungary | Esztergom | 3 December | Attended Visegrád Group summit with other member country presidents. The talks were about regional security, economic cooperation. the importance of diversifying energy supplies and the role of the United States and NATO in Central Europe. | |
| 11 | Latvia | Riga, Ādaži | 11 December | Met with President Edgars Rinkēvičs at Riga Castle. The talks concerned regional security, the war in Ukraine, the pressure Poland and other countries have relating to illegal migration from Belarus and the current situation in the Baltic Sea. Nawrocki later also met Prime Minister Evika Siliņa and then went to meet the Polish soldiers and Polish people living in Ādaži. | |

== 2026 ==
| | Country | Areas visited | Dates | Details | Image |
|---|---|---|---|---|---|
| 12 | United Kingdom | London | 12–13 January | Met with Prime Minister Keir Starmer at 10 Downing Street where they discussed relations between the two countries, trade, commerce, education and the involvement of Poland in the coalition of the willing regarding the security guarantees that are to be given to Ukraine. Nawrocki also visited the Polish diaspora where he was received in the National Army Museum in London and laid a wreath under the Polish Air Force memorial in RAF Northolt. | |
| 13 | Switzerland | Davos | 19–22 January | Attended the 56th World Economic Forum session where he engaged in debates and participated in bilateral meetings regarding economic cooperation and security. The president met with the President of the World Bank Group Ajay Banga where they discussed the infrastructure and the economic growth which will come from the Three Seas Initiative. He also met with United States President Donald Trump where they discussed security and economic cooperation between Poland and the United States. He also met with President of Armenia Vahagn Khachaturyan where they discussed security in the South Caucasus region and then later met with Prime Minister of Netherlands Dick Schoof. | |
| 14 | Lithuania | Vilnius | 24–25 January | Met with President Gitanas Nausėda at the Presidential Palace and attended the mass at Vilnius Cathedral honouring the 163rd anniversary of the January Uprising then later laid a wreath at the chapel of the January insurgents. He later also participated in the meeting of the Lublin Triangle leaders with the President of Lithuania and Ukraine. | |
| 15 | Italy | Milan | 6–7 February | Arrived for the 2026 Winter Olympics opening and during his time in Milan during the event met with Prime Minister Giorgia Meloni where they discussed bilateral relations, military cooperation and European security. Following his meeting with the Italian Prime Minister he met with US Vice President JD Vance and also discussed with President of the International Olympic Committee Kirsty Coventry the possibility of Poland hosting the Olympic Games in the future. He then later met with the Polish Olympic team within the Olympic village. | |
| 16 | Latvia | Riga | 27 February | Met with President Edgars Rinkēvičs at Riga Castle where they discussed bilateral relations, security in the region and transatlantic relations. He then later went to cheer for the Poland men's national basketball team in a game against Latvia in qualifier games to the 2027 FIBA Basketball World Cup. | |
| 17 | Hungary | Budapest | 23 March | Paid a working visit to Budapest where he met Prime Minister Viktor Orbán after receiving the Hungarian President Tamás Sulyok in Przemyśl. The Polish President also paid a visit to the Hungarian President whom he met earlier in the day. He also laid a wreath at a monument which remembers General Józef Bem. The visit was part of the annual celebrations of the Polish-Hungarian Friendship Day. | |
| 18 | United States | Bethseda, Dallas | 27–30 March | Paid a visit to the Lockheed Martin factory in Texas where the F-35 jets are being produced which Poland purchased. During this visit he took part in CPAC conference where he gave a speech stating that a "nation without identity has no future". Nawrocki also went to meet with the American Polonia. | |
| 19 | Croatia | Dubrovnik | 27–28 April | Arrived for the 11th summit of the Three Seas Initiative where he was one of the signatories of the 2026 Dubrovnik Declaration. He also met with the Croatian Prime Minister Andrej Plenković and the US Energy Secretary Chris Wright. | |
| 20 | Romania | Bucharest | 12 May | Arrived for the Bucharest Nine summit where all the leaders discussed NATO 3.0 as and the strategic importance of the eastern flank within NATO. He also met with Romanian President Nicușor Dan where they discussed bilateral cooperation regarding national security, the defence industry and the economy. Afterwards, he met with NATO Secretary General Mark Rutte in a trilateral format with the Romanian President. | |
| 21 | Italy | Rome | 17–19 May 2026 | Arrived to lay a wreath on John Paul II's grave in St. Peter's Basilica in honour of the 106th anniversary since his birth. He also met with Italian President Sergio Mattarella and Italian Prime Minister Giorgia Meloni with both of which he discussed security, Polish-Italian cooperation and affairs within the European Union. Nawrocki then attended the 82nd anniversary of the Battle of Monte Cassino where the 2nd Polish Corps was honoured. | |
| 21 | Vatican City | Vatican City | 17–19 May 2026 | Arrived to lay a wreath on John Paul II's grave in St. Peter's Basilica in honour of the 106th anniversary since his birth. He also met with Italian President Sergio Mattarella and Italian Prime Minister Giorgia Meloni with both of which he discussed security, Polish-Italian cooperation and affairs within the European Union. Nawrocki then attended the 82nd anniversary of the Battle of Monte Cassino where the 2nd Polish Corps was honoured. | |
| 22 | Switzerland | Bern, Lausanne, Morges | 27–28 May | Arrived for a state visit where he met with Swiss President Guy Parmelin and spoke to members of the Federal Council. Discussions revolved around Polish-Swiss cooperation in technology, trade and European security. Nawrocki later visited the École Polytechnique Fédérale de Lausanne and the Museum of Polish composer and former Prime Minister Ignacy Paderewski in Morges. | |
| 23 | Turkey | Ankara | 23–24 June | Met with Turkish President Recep Tayyip Erdoğan to expand bilateral defense cooperation into a strategic partnership focused on the co-creation of electronic warfare technologies. The two leaders also aligned their regional and NATO security priorities ahead of the upcoming summit and set a new bilateral trade target of $15 billion. | |
| 24 | Turkey | Ankara | 7–8 July | Arrived for the 2026 Ankara NATO summit. The priority of Nawrocki's delegation was to strengthen transatlantic relations, encourage other NATO countries to spend 5% of their GDP on defence, have them recognise Russia as a security threat and to further develop NATO's infrastructure in Central Europe. He took part in an official dinner organised by Turkish President Recep Tayyip Erdoğan. Nawrocki later also met with Finnish President Alexander Stubb and Canadian Prime Minister Mark Carney | |
| 25 | United States | New York City | 19–25 September | Nawrocki attended the 81th United Nations General Assembly. | |
| 26 | Philippines | Manila, Makati, Parañaque | 5–8 October | First sitting Polish head of state to visit the Philippines. Met with Philippine President Bongbong Marcos and First Lady Liza Araneta Marcos at Malacañang Palace for a state visit. The two presidents agreed to pursue a strategic partnership aimed at expanding bilateral cooperation in political, defense, economic, technological, and other areas. Nawrocki also laid a wreath at the Rizal Monument, opened the fifth annual Poland–Philippines IT Business Summit at iAcademy, visited the Miguel de Benavides Library and the UST Museum of Arts and Sciences, and met with former professional boxer Manny Pacquiao for a boxing training session. | |

== Future trips ==
| Country | Location | Date | Details |
|---|---|---|---|
| Hungary | Budapest | 22–23 October | Nawrocki is scheduled to meet with Prime Minister Donald Tusk attend to the 70th Anniversary Commemoration Ceremony Hungarian Revolution of 1956. |
| United States | Miami | 14–15 December | Nawrocki is scheduled to attend the G20 summit. |
