= List of ethnic enclaves in Philippine cities =

The following is a list of ethnic enclaves in Philippine cities.

== Chinese enclaves ==
- Binondo, Manila
- Banawe Street, Sta. Mesa Heights, Quezon City
- Greenhills, San Juan City
- Davao City

== Korean enclaves ==
- Poblacion, Makati
- Angeles City, where Anunas was located along Fil-Am Friendship Highway.
- Malate, Manila

== Japanese enclaves ==
- Japantown, Makati at Glorietta Mall
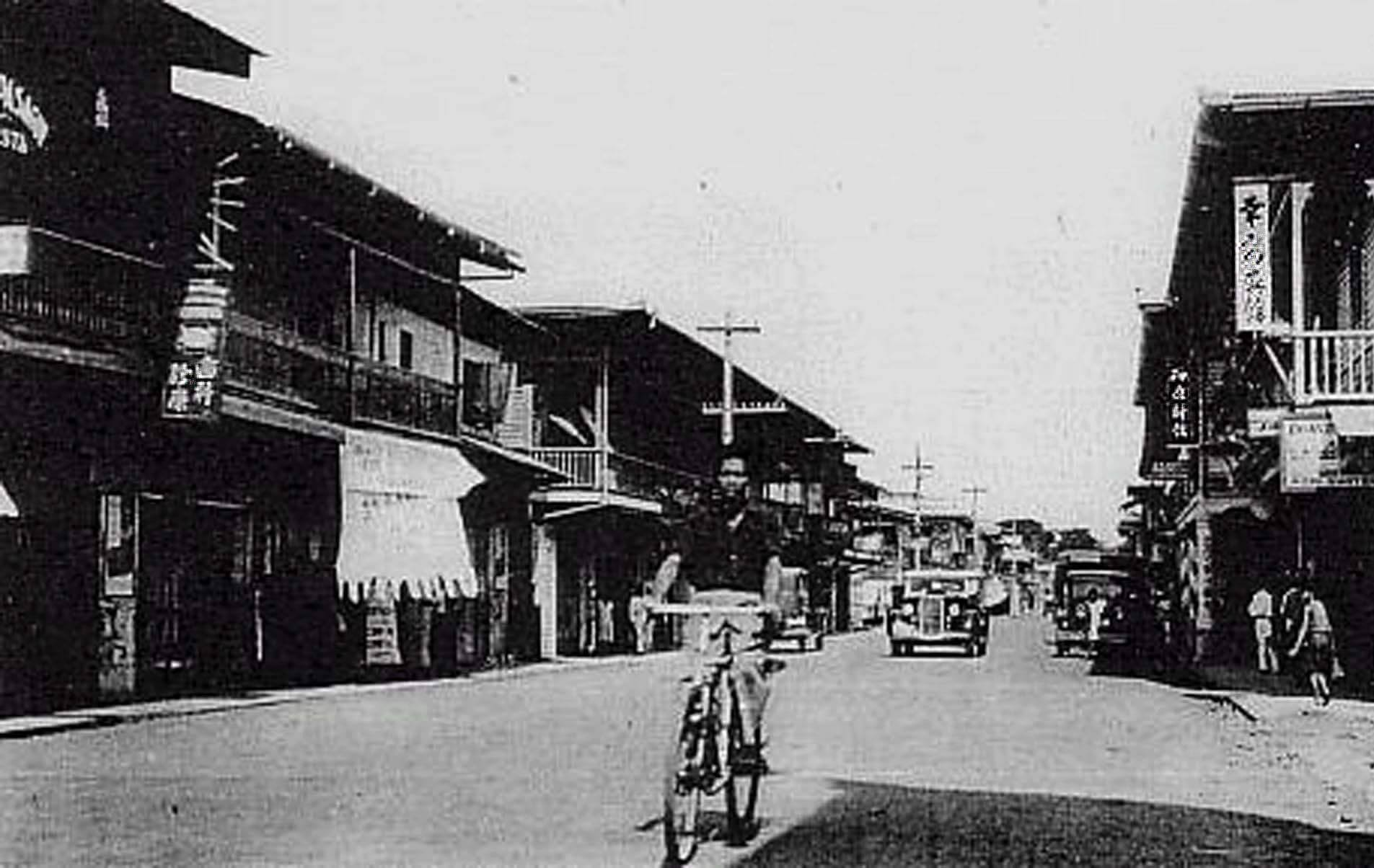
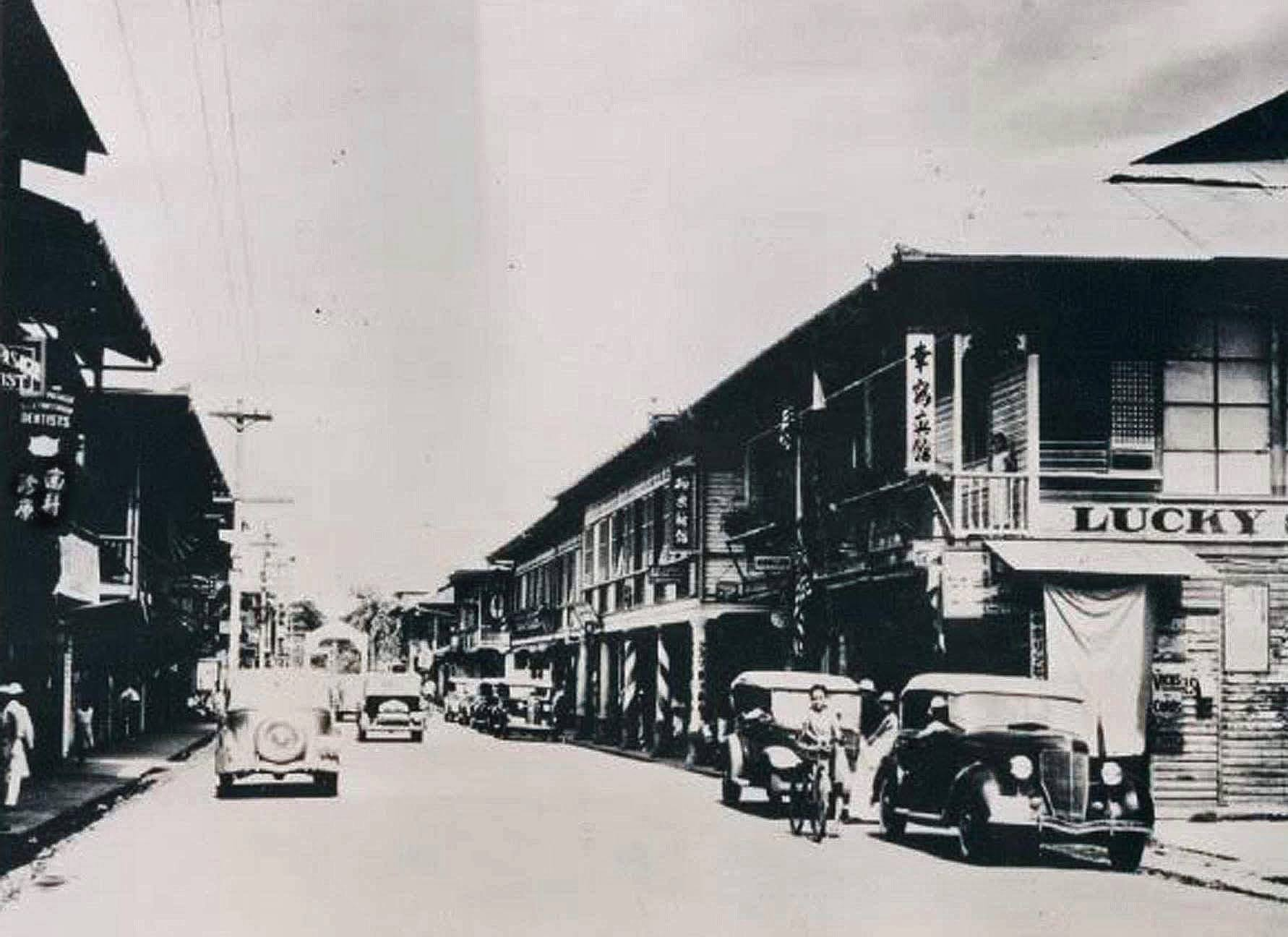
  Little Tokyo (Barangay Mintal) in Davao City (1936)
- Japantown, Paco, Manila
- Japantown, Iloilo City
- Japantown, Cebu City
- Japantown, Mandaue City
- Japantown, Davao City
- Little Tokyo, Makati. This Japanese neighborhood can be found along the stretch of Chino Roces Avenue and neighboring streets in the area approximately between Rufino Street and Arnaiz Avenue.
- Mintal, a barangay in Davao City, known as Little Tokyo.
- Little Kyoto, Cebu City

== See also ==
- Demographics of the Philippines
- Ethnic groups in the Philippines
- Philippine population by country of citizenship
