= Embassy of Poland, Manila =

Embassy of the Republic of Poland in Manila Ambasada Rzeczypospolitej Polskiej w Manili Pasuguan ng Republika ng Polonya sa Maynila

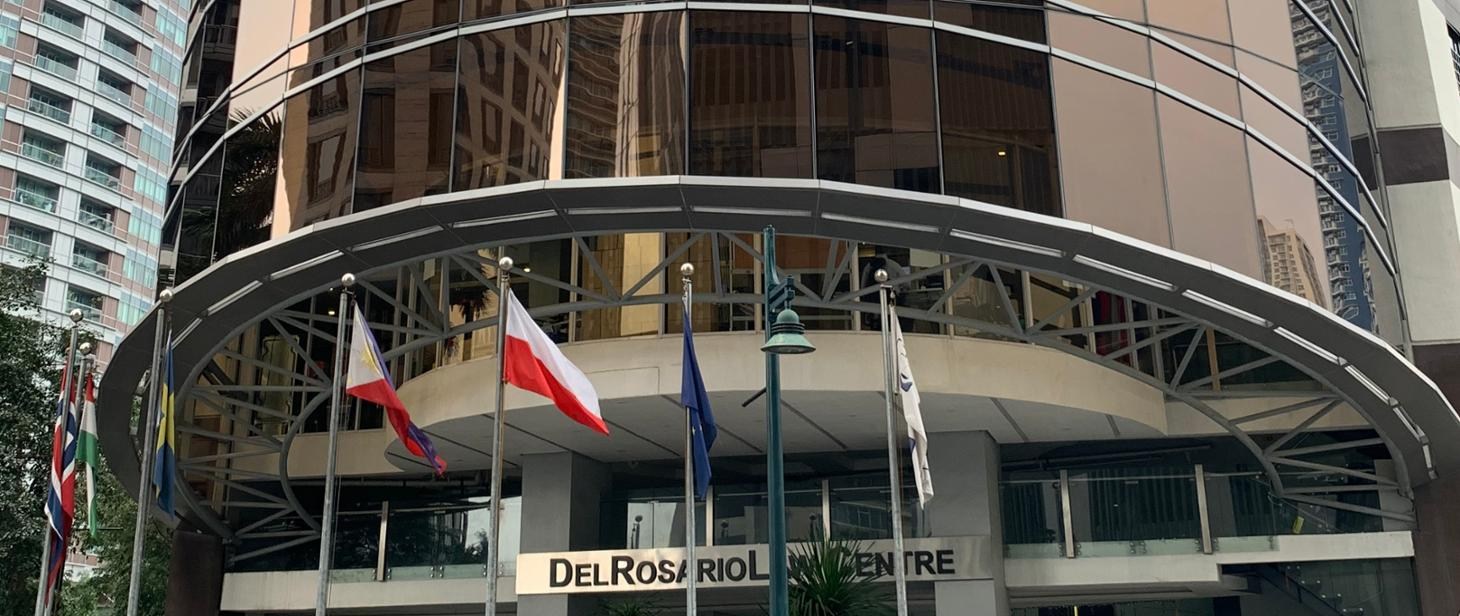
- Location: Taguig, Metro Manila, Philippines
- Address: 9th Floor, Del Rosario Law Centre, 21st Drive cor. 20th Drive, Bonifacio Global City
- Coordinates: 14°32′37.2″N 121°02′50.3″E
- Chargé d'affaires: Katarzyna Wilkowiecka
- Website: www.gov.pl/web/philippines

The Embassy of Poland in Manila is the diplomatic mission of the Republic of Poland to the Republic of the Philippines. The embassy was opened on 4 January 2018, although a previous embassy was also established in the early 1990s.

== History ==
Poland did not initially open a resident embassy in the Philippines when diplomatic relations between the two countries were formally established on 22 September 1973, with relations initially being conducted through the Polish embassy in Tokyo. In 1993, a resident embassy was opened in Manila, but the mission was closed the following year.

Following the closure of the resident embassy, the Philippines was placed under the jurisdiction of the Polish embassy in Bangkok, and eventually the embassy in Kuala Lumpur. While there was no resident embassy in the Philippines, Poland conducted its diplomatic relations through its honorary consulate in Manila, which was first opened in 1938. A second honorary consulate was opened in Cebu City in 2009, followed by a third in General Santos in 2013.

In 2013, the Polish Ministry of Foreign Affairs sent a delegation to the Philippines to discuss the possible reopening of the embassy in Manila, owing to the growing Philippine economy and the possibility of enhancing political, economic and touristic exchanges through having a permanent presence in the Philippines. Three years later, Foreign Minister Witold Waszczykowski announced in a speech delivered on the floor of the Sejm that the embassy in Manila would be reopened, coinciding with Poland's desire to expand its economic involvement in Asia.

On 23 August 2017, Deputy Foreign Minister Marek Magierowski presented a note verbale to Patricia Ann Paez, the Philippine ambassador to Poland, informing the Philippine government that it would be reopening the embassy on 2 January 2018, and after 24 years of closure, the Polish Embassy in Manila was finally reopened on 4 January 2018.

== Location ==
The chancery is located in the Del Rosario Law Center, in the business district Bonifacio Global City of Taguig, Metro Manila. The building also houses the embassies of Sweden, Norway, and Hungary.

== See also ==
- Philippines–Poland relations
- Embassy of the Philippines, Warsaw
- Polish settlement in the Philippines
- List of diplomatic missions of Poland
