= Polish settlement in the Philippines =

Total population
- 93 (2010)

Regions with significant populations
- Metro Manila

Languages
- Spanish · Philippine languages · Polish

Religion
- Roman Catholic and Judaism

Related ethnic groups
- Polish people, Polish diaspora, German settlement in the Philippines

Polish settlement in the Philippines began during the Spanish colonial period, mostly with the arrival of Catholic clergy destined for missionary work in other Asian countries. As of 2010 census, there are 93 persons in the Philippines who claim Polish citizenship, and the Polish community in the Philippines is the fourth-largest Central European community in the country, after the local communities of Germans, Hungarians and Albanians.

== History ==
Although there is evidence that Polish settlement in the Philippines began during the Spanish period, and while there certainly was interaction between the two countries, any history of the Polish community in the Philippines before the end of the 19th century is virtually unknown. As early as 1618 though, Poles were already recorded as being among the nationalities seen in old Manila.

It is believed that the first documented case of a Pole setting foot into the Philippines was that of Wojciech Męciński, a Jesuit missionary from Kraków who participated in missionary activities in Japan, China and Vietnam. In 1642, Męciński arrived in Manila from Vietnam along with a large group of fellow Jesuits, where they were greeted by Governor-General Sebastián Hurtado de Corcuera. Męciński stayed in Manila for a few months before he was deployed on his second visit to Japan, where he was martyred in Nagasaki on March 23, 1643.

The second Pole to arrive in the Philippines was another Jesuit missionary, Jan Chryzostom Bąkowski from Częstochowa. Bąkowski initially participated in missionary activities in China, particularly in Jiangsu. However, he was arrested and sent to Canton, where after being unable to deal with being kept in forced isolation, he departed for Manila. While in Manila, he participated in evangelizing among the Chinese Filipino community until he died in 1731. Aside from Bąkowski, several Polish Catholic clergy have also stayed in the Philippines, including Władysław Michał Zaleski, who served as papal delegate to the East Indies from 1886 to 1916, and Józef Wiśniewski, who served as a missionary in the Philippines prior to becoming a chaplain in the Polish Army, where he was arrested by the Germans in 1940 and died at the Dachau concentration camp.

It is believed that the first non-religious Pole to arrive in the Philippines was Maksymilian Teofil Gumplowicz from Kraków, who between 1883 and 1886 served as a doctor for the Dutch navy in the Dutch East Indies (modern-day Indonesia). During his tour of duty with the Dutch navy, Gumplowicz visited not only islands throughout the Dutch East Indies, but also the Philippines, British Malaya and New Guinea.

The American colonial period saw rapid growth in the local Polish community, although most people in the Philippines at the time who were of Polish descent were Polish Americans. One of them, Michael Sendzimir, a second lieutenant in the 98th Infantry Division during World War II, was the eldest son of industrialist Tadeusz Sendzimir. However, prominent Poles from Poland proper also visited the Philippines during this time, including pianist Artur Rubenstein, who gave a concert in Manila in 1935, geologist Józef Zwierzycki, whose findings on the tectonics of northern New Guinea was published in the Philippine Journal of Science in 1926, and sculptor Michał Paszyn, who arrived in the Philippines in 1933 and eventually married a Filipina before moving to Italy. In the interbellum, there was one Polish-ran enterprise, Sielski Sweet Shop Co. in Manila, a sweet shop and caramel and chocolate factory established by Polish immigrant Władysław Sielski. Sielski founded a Polish library in Manila. He sympathized with Filipino independence aspirations and photo-documented their efforts.

Today, some Poles come to the Philippines as immigrants, expats, foreign exchange students, or settle down in the Philippines with their Filipino spouses.

== Notable Filipinos of Polish descent ==
- Robert Jaworski - basketball player and former Senator
- Malaya Lewandowski - singer and VJ
- Zaldy Zshornack - actor

== See also ==
- Philippines–Poland relations
- Polish diaspora
- Filipinos in Poland
