= Embassy of the Philippines, Helsinki =

Diplomatic mission of the Philippines in Finland

Embassy of the Philippines, Helsinki Pasuguan ng Pilipinas sa Helsinki Filippiinien Helsingin-suurlähetystö Filippinernas ambassad i Helsingfors

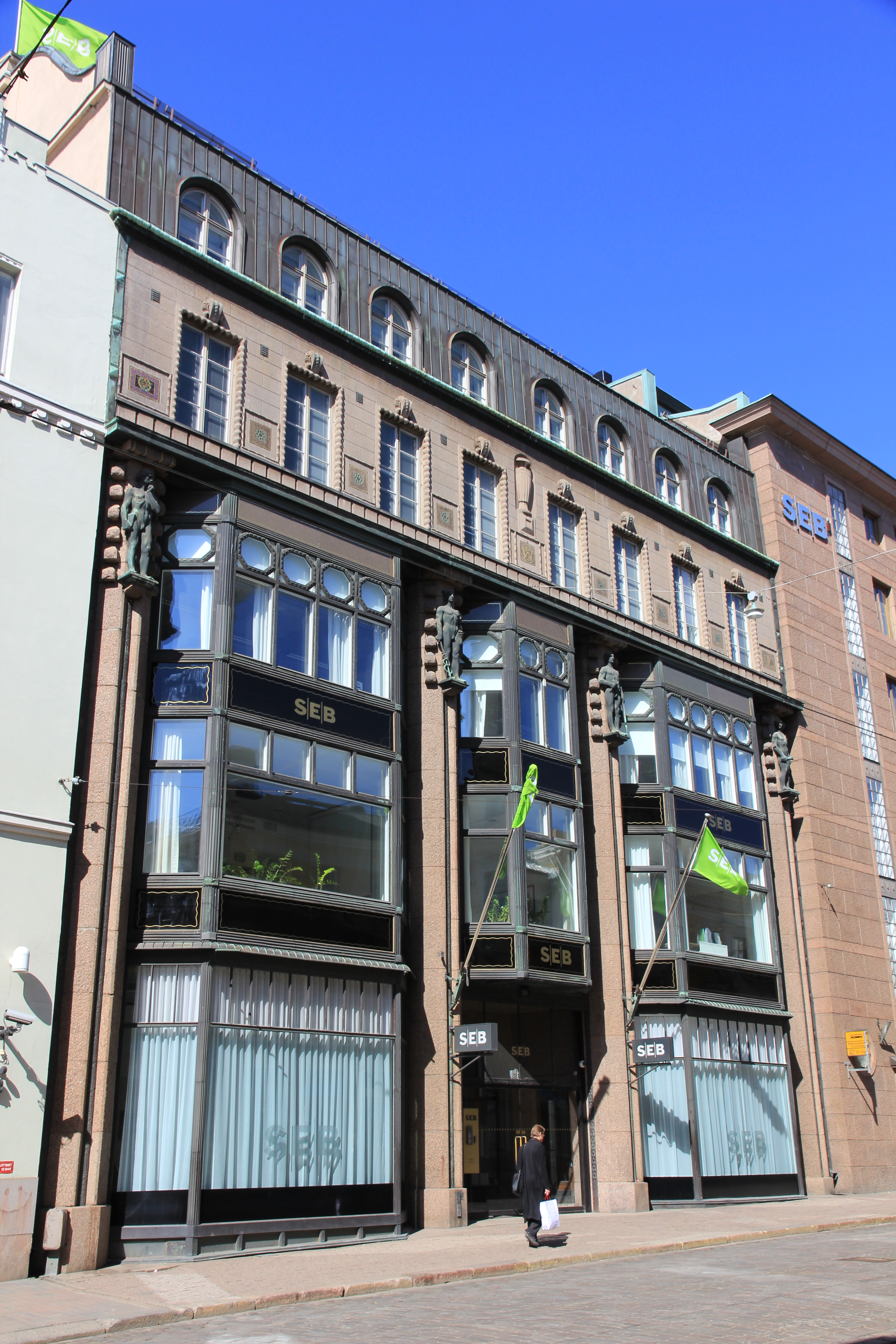
- Location: Helsinki
- Address: Unioninkatu 30
- Coordinates: 60°10′6.4″N 24°57′3.1″E
- Ambassador: Domingo P. Nolasco

The Embassy of the Philippines in Helsinki is the diplomatic mission of the Republic of the Philippines to the Republic of Finland. It is located on Unioninkatu in the Kluuvi neighborhood of central Helsinki, south of Senate Square.

Although the current embassy dates from 2024, the Philippines also maintained a previous resident embassy in Finland between 2009 and 2012.

== History ==
Diplomatic relations between the Philippines and Finland were established on July 14, 1955, although a resident mission would not open until much later. Relations were initially conducted through the Philippine Embassy in London, with President Ramon Magsaysay appointing León María Guerrero III as non-resident ambassador to Finland. Jurisdiction over Finland would later pass between various missions in Europe, including the embassies in Bonn, Moscow, and Stockholm.

Deepening relations, especially economic ties, between the Philippines and Finland would lead to the opening of the embassy on November 2, 2009, during the presidency of Gloria Macapagal Arroyo, alongside resident missions also opening that year in Ireland, Poland, and Portugal. Led by Maria Angelina M. Sta. Catalina as the mission's first ambassador, it would take over responsibility for conducting relations with Finland from the Philippine Embassy in Stockholm ten days later, and consular services would later be offered starting on April 12, 2010, with the opening of the embassy's consular section.

Expansion of the Philippines' diplomatic presence abroad during the Arroyo presidency was not without controversy: in 2010, Senator Franklin Drilon questioned the need for embassies in countries with small Filipino communities, including a number of countries in Europe, and called for a review of the Philippines' diplomatic presence worldwide. This would lead to the closure of ten posts under Arroyo's successor, Benigno Aquino III, and ultimately to the closure of the embassies in Finland and Sweden on October 31, 2012, with both countries being placed under the jurisdiction of the Philippine Embassy in Oslo, and services in Finland provided through an honorary consulate in Helsinki. Finland was then later placed under the jurisdiction of the reopened Philippine Embassy in Stockholm on May 15, 2020, and a second honorary consulate, replacing the first one, opened in Espoo two months later on July 16, 2020.

On November 15, 2022, during budget deliberations for the Department of Foreign Affairs (DFA), Senator Loren Legarda announced that the embassy was one of four missions that would reopen in 2024. Spurred in part by the reopening of the Finnish Embassy in Manila in 2020, this was reaffirmed by Vice President Sara Duterte in October 2023, and some time thereafter the DFA itself confirmed that it was undertaking final preparations for the reopening of a resident Philippine mission in Finland in 2024.

The advance team setting up the embassy announced that they had arrived in Helsinki on September 24, 2024, and it formally opened nearly two weeks later on October 4, 2024. Consular services began to be offered on November 18, 2024, with the first consular client being welcomed two days later.

== Chancery ==
The chancery of the Philippine Embassy in Helsinki was first located on Keskuskatu 1b in Kluuvi, behind Helsinki's central Stockmann department store and beside the Kirjatalo. With the embassy's reopening in 2024, it set up a new temporary chancery nearby on Mannerheimintie 12b in neighboring Kamppi, this time across from the department store.

On February 13, 2025, the embassy announced that the chancery will be relocating to the sixth floor of Wuorio House, located south of Senate Square on Unioninkatu in Kluuvi, on March 1, 2025. Occupying the building's uppermost floor, the 521-square-meter (5,610 sq ft) space has views of the sea from the windows, and was to be delivered in a turnkey condition by Colliers International, the company managing the building, to its future tenant.

The chancery was inaugurated on May 19, 2026 by Foreign Affairs Secretary Ma. Theresa P. Lazaro, alongside other Finnish and foreign dignitaries, as well as former Philippine honorary consuls to Finland, who were also in attendance.

== Staff and activities ==
The Philippine Embassy in Helsinki is headed by Ambassador Domingo P. Nolasco, who was appointed to the position by President Bongbong Marcos on June 25, 2024. Prior to his appointment as ambassador, Nolasco, a career diplomat, served as the DFA's Assistant Secretary for Financial Management Services, and before that served at the Philippine Embassy in Rome as ambassador to Italy. His appointment was confirmed by the Commission on Appointments on August 7, 2024, and he presented his credentials to Finnish President Alexander Stubb on December 2, 2024.

In addition to Finland, the embassy exercises jurisdiction over the Philippines' relationship with Estonia, which it assumed from the Philippine Embassy in Warsaw on December 18, 2024.

== See also ==
- List of diplomatic missions of the Philippines
- Filipinos in Finland
