= Filipinos in Norway =

Total population
- 25,078 (2019 Official Norway estimate) 0.47% of the Norwegian population

Regions with significant populations
- Oslo

Languages
- Norwegian, Tagalog, English, and other languages of the Philippines

Religion
- Roman Catholicism · Protestantism

Related ethnic groups
- Filipino people, Overseas Filipinos

Filipinos in Norway comprise expatriates and migrants from the Philippines to Norway and their locally-born descendants. As of 2019, there are approximately 25,000 Filipinos in Norway.

== Economy and employment ==
Nearly 75% of Filipinos in Norway are sea-based and working in the maritime industry. The other 25% of land-based Filipinos in Norway are employed in the health care industry as physicians and nurses, in the information technology sector, in the petroleum industry as engineers, as au pairs or domestic workers, or as business, non-governmental organization and government support staff. Filipinos are granted about 70% of au pair permits that are issued in Norway.

In 2011, Filipinos in Norway officially sent a total of nearly $352.8 million USD in remittances back to the Philippines (US$294.1 sea-based and US$57.8 land-based), after a peak of $372.5 million USD in remittances in 2010. This was the fourth-largest 2011 total in Europe after Italy, the United Kingdom, and Germany and the second-largest sea-based total for all nations except for the United States. Three Filipino banks have correspondent accounts with banks in Norway to allow for remittance transfers.

== Society and culture ==
Due to the number of Filipinos living in Norway and increased economic cooperation between Norway and the Philippines, the Philippine government opened an embassy in Oslo in 2007, which also represents Filipino interests in Denmark, Sweden and Iceland.

Since 2007, the Drammen Filipino Dance Group has organized Filippinsk Kulturaften, a Filipino cultural show, held annually in Drammen. In addition, Philippine holidays, such as Independence Day, commemorating the Philippine Declaration of Independence, are celebrated in Norway. Since 2011, hundreds of people have attended annual parades and other celebrations in Oslo to mark the occasion.

== See also ==
- Norway–Philippines relations
- Filipino diaspora
- Immigration to Norway
