= Filipinos in Poland =

Total population
- 21,000-25,000 (estimates as of January 2026)

Regions with significant populations
- Throughout Poland

Languages
- Filipino, other languages of the Philippines, Polish, English

Religion
- Roman Catholicism · Protestantism

Related ethnic groups
- Filipino people, Overseas Filipino

Filipinos in Poland, the citizens of the Philippines as well as their descendants who are currently living in Poland, are mostly residing in the country on a temporary basis. As of January 2026, there are between 21,000 and 25,000 Filipinos across the country, based on the estimates of the Philippine Embassy in Warsaw.

== Demographics ==
Although Filipinos in Poland are spread throughout the country, they are mostly concentrated in urban centers, with Filipino communities in cities such as Warsaw, Kraków, Poznań, and Łódź. Most Filipinos in Poland are employed either in the banking sector, in the hospitality industry, as domestic helpers, or as Catholic clergy. Some are employed also as computer programmers, while a number are also students: twelve Filipinos have studied at the University of Warsaw from 2010 to 2013 under the European Union's Erasmus Mundus program.

== Society and culture ==
The Filipino community in Poland regularly organizes events, at times with the participation of the Philippine Embassy in Warsaw. Filipinos are a fixture at Warsaw's only English-language Catholic Mass, where many are active in church services, and around 100 people also gather every first Sunday of the month to hear a separate community Mass at the Parish of the Blessed Virgin Mary, Mother of the Church in the Mokotów district of Warsaw.

Likewise, the Philippine Embassy organizes events around major Philippine holidays such as Independence Day and the People Power Revolution. In 2011, the Philippine Embassy organized a Marian pilgrimage to Domacyno, its first outreach project outside of Warsaw.

There has also been interest in organizing an Association of Filipinos in Poland.

In February 2018, the Jesus Is Lord Church Worldwide has started holding its Sunday Worship & Healing Services in Leonardo Royal Hotel in Warsaw, Poland. This church bring all peoples to the kingdom of the living God regardless of race, status, belief and religious affiliations through the saving, healing, delivering, and transforming power of the Lord Jesus Christ.

=== Filipinos in Polish popular culture ===
Filipinos have appeared on Polish television shows such as Dzień Dobry TVN, Pytanie na śniadanie and other programs. Notably, Filipinos who joined Polish talent shows on television have done well: these include Cristina Bien winning Szansa na sukces in 2008, Alexander Martinez placing third in the second season of Mam talent! in 2009, and Conrado Yanez placing second in the Polish version of Must Be the Music in 2011.

== See also ==
- Philippines–Poland relations
- Polish settlement in the Philippines
