= Germans in the Philippines =

Ethnic group in the Philippines

Regions with significant populations
- Manila, Makati

Languages
- Filipino, German, Spanish

Religion
- Catholicism, Judaism

Related ethnic groups
- German people, Polish settlement in the Philippines

German settlement in the Philippines began during the Spanish colonization of the Philippines when the German Empire attempted to acquire the Philippines. This article also refers to the choice of Filipino citizenship and/or settlement in the Philippines by persons of either pure or mixed German descent who continued to reside in the country for a significant number of years or decades. The German community in the Philippines is the largest central European community in the country. The community comprises expats and immigrants.

== History ==
=== Spanish rule ===
The first Germans to arrive in the Philippines were colonists. Otto von Bismarck’s German Empire was one of the United States' rivals in replacing Spanish rule in the archipelago. From 1890 to the outbreak of the Spanish–American War in 1898, there was a lull in the German Empire's colonial campaigns. Like other colonialist nations, the German Empire sought to protect its overseas nationals and trade interests to the extent of safeguarding free access to markets. A German squadron arrived in Manila and engaged in maneuvers which Commodore George Dewey, seeing this as an obstruction of his blockade, offered war — after which the Germans backed down.

=== First Philippine Republic ===
The Battle of Manila Bay took place on 1 May 1898, following the outbreak of the Spanish–American War. The German Emperor expected an American defeat, with Spain left in a sufficiently weak position for the revolutionaries to capture Manila—leaving the Philippines ripe for German picking. Following the American victory in the war, the Philippines and the Far East were brought to the attention of the world and Germany recognized the great potentialities of the islands as a major commercial market.

On 12 June, the day the Philippines declared its independence from Spain, Vice-Admiral Otto von Diederichs arrived in Manila Bay. The number of German war vessels in Philippine waters increased to three. Earlier, on 6 and 9 May, respectively, the German ships Irene and the Cormoran arrived in the bay with a separate instruction from the German government, mainly to protect German nationals in Manila. German's interest in the Philippines was cut short with the signing of the Treaty of Paris on 10 December 1898. The Philippines was finally annexed by the United States in 1899.

=== American period ===
The Philippines was part of the United States between 1913 and 1946. During the era of the Philippine Commonwealth, 1935–1946, Jewish refugees including German Jews from Europe sought a safe haven in Manila. The migration of Jews escaping Europe between 1935 and 1941 was the last major immigration of Jews to the Philippines. The first German Jews to arrive in Manila actually came from the Jewish community in Shanghai. With the occupation of Peking by the Japanese in 1937, the four million inhabitants of Shanghai were endangered. Germany's shift of alliance from China to Japan at this time alarmed German Jews in Shanghai, fearing German pressure on Japan to adopt Nazi anti-Jewish policies. Fearing for them as well, the Jewish Community in Manila, led by the Frieder Brothers of Cincinnati, organized the Jewish Refugee Committee of Manila (JRC) with the intention of rescuing German members of the Shanghai Jewish community.

=== Modern era ===
In recent years, several German businesses have set up shops in the Philippines, and a number of Germans have chosen the Philippines as their new residence. In the Philippines, since its formation in January 1906, the German Club has provided a place of respite and interaction for Germans and Filipinos alike. The Germans in the Philippines are also well integrated and also contribute to the business sector of the Philippines. In the past century, it has stood witness to the country's unfolding history and today enjoys the regular patronage of members and guests at its current location in Legaspi Village, Makati.

== Notable Filipinos of German descent ==
Panchito Alba

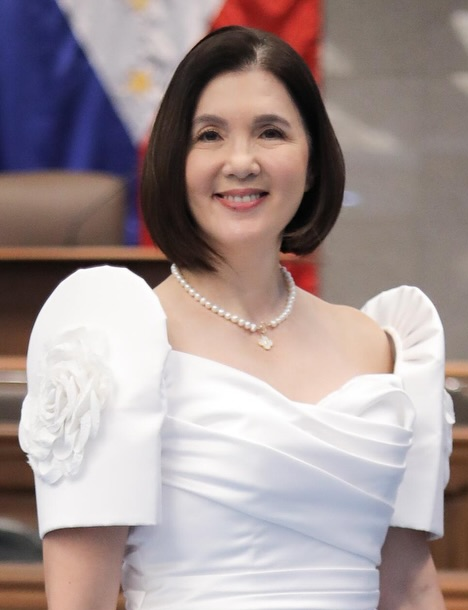
Pia Cayetano

Sara Duterte

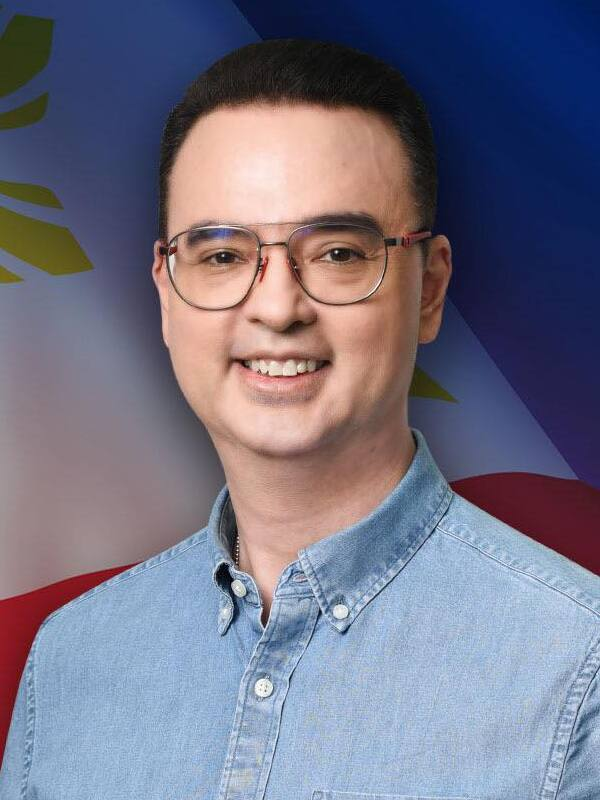
Alan Peter Cayetano

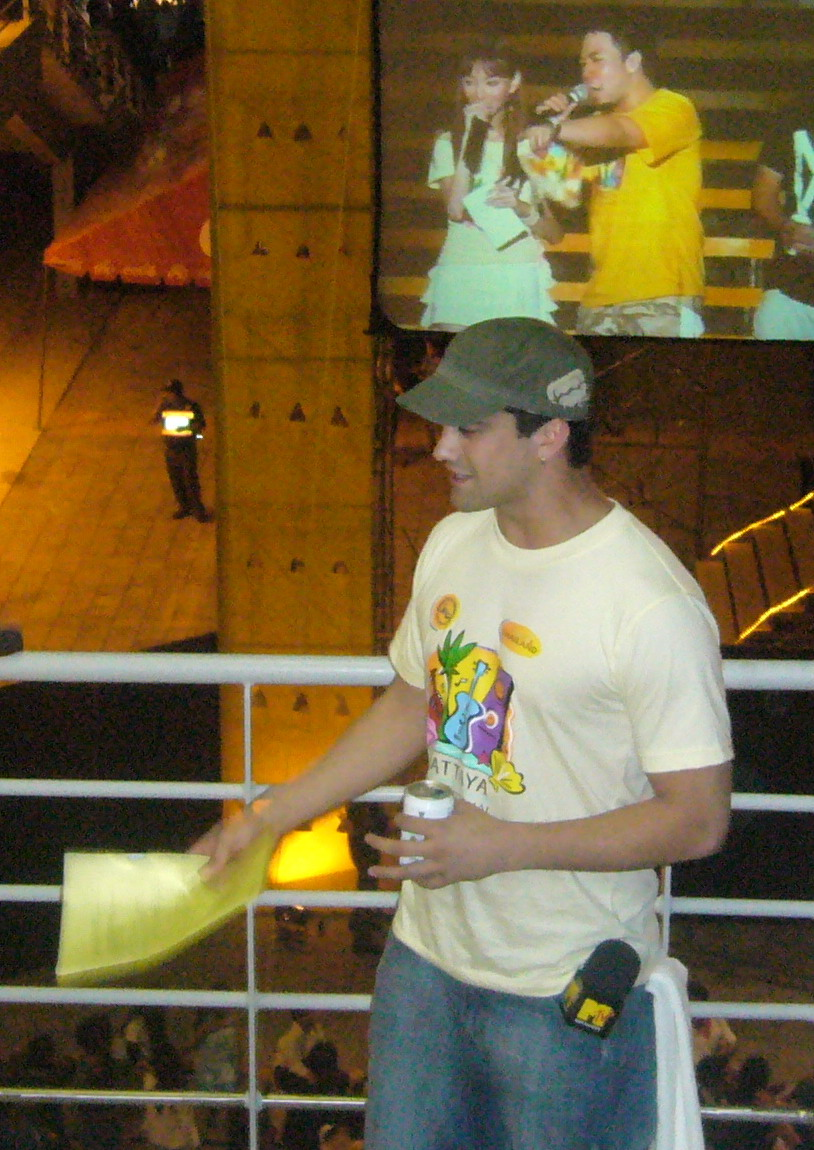
Colby Miller

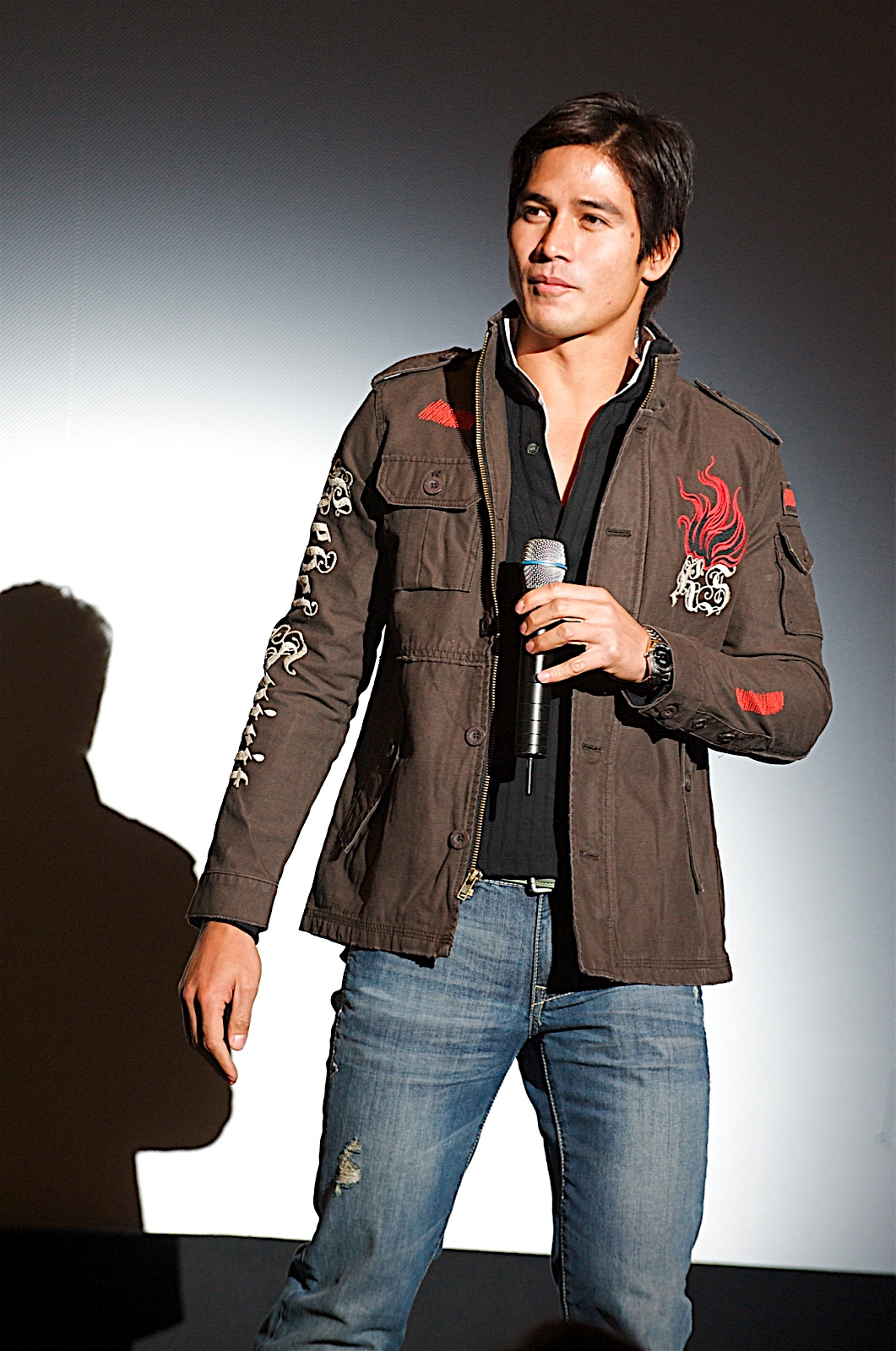
Piolo Pascual

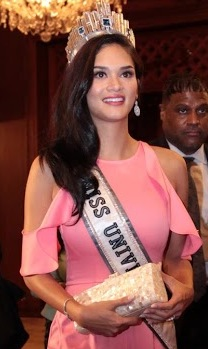
Pia Wurtzbach
- Ashley Ortega - Actress
- Christopher de Leon - Actor
- Angelika Dela Cruz - Actress, singer, politician
- Michael de Mesa - Actor
- Krista K - Model
- Carla Abellana - Actress
- Ivan Dorschner - Actor, model
- Paolo Duterte - Businessman
- William Beier - Figure ice skating
- Jestoni Alarcon - Actor
- Panchito Alba - Actor active from the 1950s through the 1990s, FAMAS Award recipient
- Arjo Atayde - Actor
- Ria Atayde - Actress
- Rita Avila - Actress
- Kurt Bachmann - Basketball player, Philippine National Team
- Robert Ace Barbers - politician
- Robert Barbers - former politician and former Western Police District (WPD) officer
- Charles Borck - Basketball player
- Aleck Bovick - Actress
- Michele Bumgarner - Racing driver
- Felix Brawner Jr. - Army brigadier general
- Romeo Brawner Jr. - Chief of Staff of the Armed Forces of the Philippines (2023–2026)
- Romeo Brawner Sr. - Former Commissioner, COMELEC
- Sara Duterte - 15th Vice President of the Philippines
- Alan Peter Cayetano - Senator, Secretary of Foreign Affairs
- Lino Cayetano - Director, producer
- Pia Cayetano - Senator, representative
- Charlie Cojuangco - Politician
- Mark Cojuangco - Politician
- Will Devaughn - Actor
- Etang Discher - Actress 1930s–1950s
- Lilia Dizon - Actress
- Mathew Dumba - Ice hockey player
- Andi Eigenmann - Actress
- Gabby Eigenmann - Actor
- Geoff Eigenmann - Actor
- Ryan Eigenmann - Actor
- Maike Evers - Model, VJ
- E. J. Feihl - Basketball player
- Gerphil Flores - Soprano
- Amalia Fuentes - Actress
- Harry Gasser - News Presenter
- Baron Geisler - Actor
- Donald Geisler - Businessman, former athlete
- Melody Gersbach - Beauty pageant contestant
- Cherie Gil - Actress
- Enrique Gil - Actor, commercial model, dancer, performer
- Mark Gil - Actor
- Nikki Gil - Actress, singer
- Roxanne Guinoo - Star Circle Teen Quest contestant, model and actress
- Edward Hagedorn - Puerto Princesa City mayor
- Christine Jacob - TV personality, former swimmer
- Jaclyn Jose - Actress
- Bianca King - Actress
- Krista Kleiner - Beauty pageant contestant
- Doug Kramer - PBA basketball player, model
- Helga Krapf - Actress
- Juan Karlos Labajo - Actor, singer
- Renaldo Lapuz - Musician, singer-songwriter
- Laura Lehmann - Beauty pageant contestant
- Katharina Lehnert - Tennis player
- Gabriel de Leon - Actor
- Malaya Lewandowski - Actress, singer
- Sid Lucero - Actor, model
- Eddie Mesa - Actor 1950s–1990s
- Colby Miller - MTV Asia VJ
- Ara Mina - Actress
- Jewel Mische - Actress
- Julia Montes - ABS-CBN Actress
- Aga Muhlach - Actor, model, product endorser
- Niño Muhlach - Actor
- Diether Ocampo - Actor, model
- John Osmeña - Politician
- Lito Osmeña - Politician
- Paraluman - Actress, FAMAS Award recipient
- Gina Pareño - Actress
- Piolo Pascual - Model, film and television actor, musician
- Polo Ravales - Actor
- Delia Razon - Actress
- John Regala - Actor, Christian minister and environmentalist
- Cristine Reyes - Actress
- Christopher Ricketts - Martial arts instructor, actor
- Ronnie Ricketts - Actor, fight director, martial arts instructor, film producer and director
- Ross Rival - Actor
- Rosanna Roces - Actress
- Lana Roi - Singer, model
- Jen Rosendahl - Actress
- Lou Salvador - former basketball player turned film producer
- Lou Salvador, Jr. - former teen star during 1950s
- Nadine Samonte - Starstruck Season 1 contestant, model, actress
- Empress Schuck - Actress
- Imelda Schweighart- Beauty titleholder
- Sandra Seifert - Beauty pageant contestant
- Daniela Stranner - actress
- Mary Walter - Actress 1920s–1990s
- Freddie Webb - Actor, former politician, former athlete
- Pinky Webb - Broadcasting journalist, newscaster
- Valerie Weigmann - Actress, TV host, fashion model, beauty pageant titleholder
- Pia Wurtzbach - Actress, model, Miss Universe 2015
- Maureen Wroblewitz - Actress, model
- The Zobel de Ayala family - successful Filipino business family
- Zaldy Zshornack - actor

== See also ==
- History of the Jews in the Philippines
- Filipinos in Germany
- Germany–Philippines relations
