= Embassy of the Philippines, Warsaw =

Diplomatic mission of the Philippines in Poland

Embassy of the Philippines, Warsaw Pasuguan ng Pilipinas sa Barsobya Ambasada Filipin w Warszawie

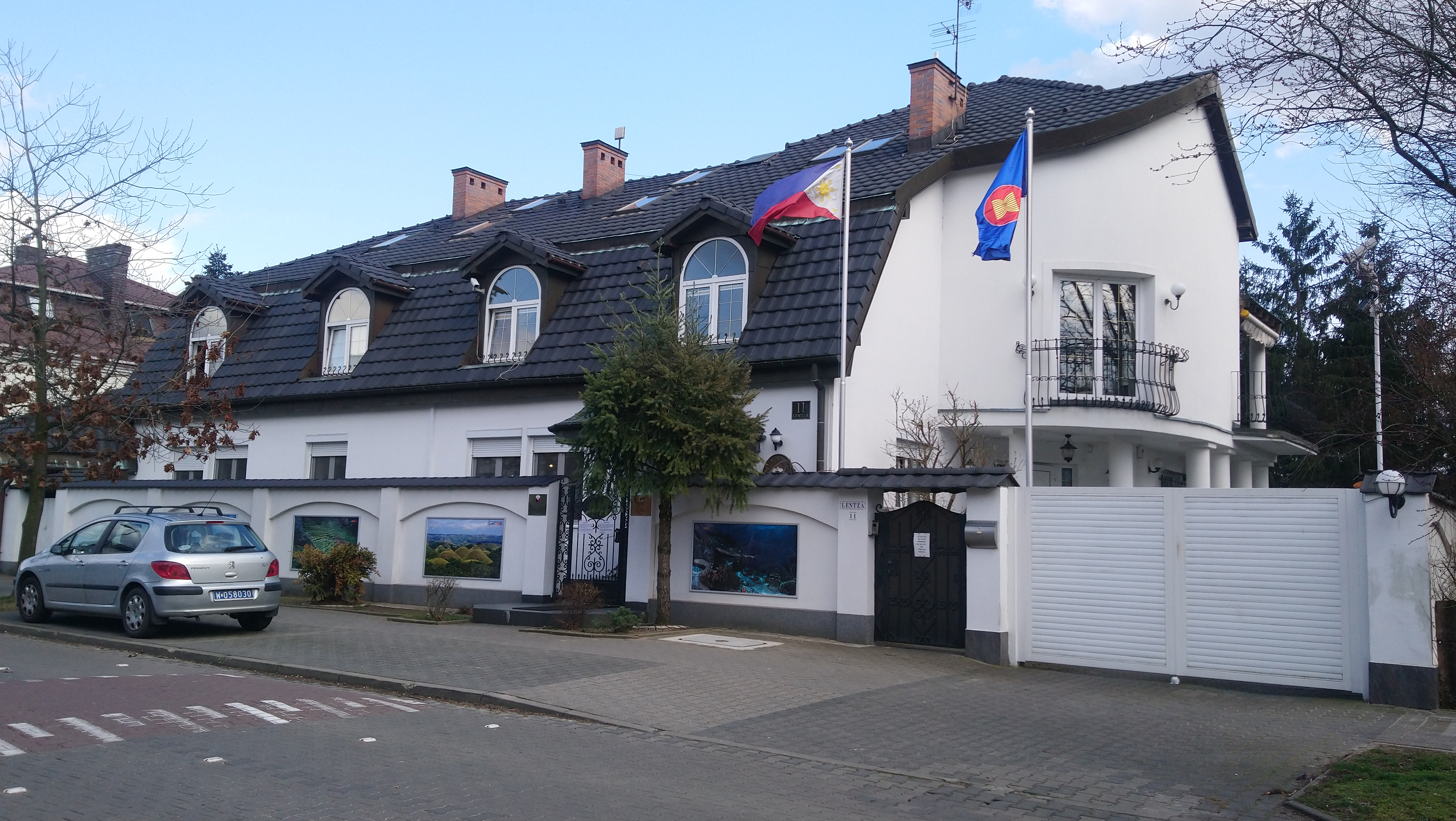
- Location: Warsaw
- Address: ul. Stanisława Lentza 11
- Coordinates: 52°10′22.65″N 21°4′35.47″E
- Ambassador: Alan L. Deniega
- Website: http://warsawpe.dfa.gov.ph

The Embassy of the Philippines in Warsaw is the diplomatic mission of the Republic of the Philippines to the Republic of Poland. It is located on ul. Stanisława Lentza 11 in the Wilanów district of south Warsaw, near the Wilanów Palace. Although the current embassy dates from 2009, the Philippines also maintained a previous resident embassy in Poland in the early 1990s.

== History ==
The Philippines did not initially open a resident mission in Poland when diplomatic relations between the Philippines and Poland were established on September 22, 1973. Diplomatic relations between the two countries were originally conducted via the Philippine Embassy in The Hague, which maintained jurisdiction over Poland until 1982, when jurisdiction was transferred to the Philippine Embassy in East Berlin. In 1991, with the democratization of Poland, jurisdiction was transferred to the Philippines' newly opened resident embassy in Warsaw.

Financial difficulties forced the closure of the embassy in 1993, with jurisdiction transferred to the Philippine Embassy in Budapest. In 2002 columnist Amando Doronila, writing in the Philippine Daily Inquirer, questioned the wisdom of closing the embassy at a time when the Philippine foreign service was being downsized despite the subsequent rise of Polish influence in Europe since then, as well as its eventual accession to the European Union in 2004. While there was no resident embassy in Poland, the Philippines conducted diplomatic relations in the country through an honorary consulate based in Warsaw. A second honorary consulate was opened in Wrocław in 2005, with jurisdiction over Poland's southern voivodeships.

On September 6, 2009, the embassy was reopened at its current location, around the same time new resident embassies in Ireland, Finland and Portugal were also opened. Alejandro del Rosario, who at the time was completing his deployment as ambassador to Hungary, was appointed as the mission's first ambassador, ostensibly out of the need to open the post as soon as possible, and the honorary consulate in Warsaw was moved to Poznań. The opening of the mission was not without controversy: in 2010, Senator Franklin Drilon questioned the need for embassies in countries with small Filipino communities, including Poland, and called for a review of the Philippines' diplomatic presence worldwide. This led to the closure of ten posts in 2012, including the closure of the Philippine Embassy in Stockholm on October 31, 2012, which had jurisdiction over Estonia, Latvia, and Lithuania. Jurisdiction over the three countries was subsequently transferred to the Warsaw mission the following year, although Estonia was later transferred to the jurisdiction of the embassy in Helsinki on December 18, 2024 and Latvia was transferred back to the jurisdiction of the embassy in Stockholm in 2025.

In 2018, the embassy's jurisdiction was widened to include Ukraine, which had previously been under the jurisdiction of the Philippine Embassy in Moscow.

== Staff and activities ==
The Philippine Embassy in Warsaw is currently headed by Ambassador Alan L. Deniega, who was appointed to the position by President Bongbong Marcos on June 2, 2025. Prior to his appointment as ambassador, Deniega, a career diplomat, was deployed to the Philippine Embassy in Dhaka as ambassador to Bangladesh. His appointment was confirmed by the Commission on Appointments shortly afterward on June 4, 2025, and he presented his credentials to Polish President Karol Nawrocki on October 13, 2025. The Warsaw mission is one of the Philippines' smaller diplomatic missions, with a total of eight staff members.

Many of the embassy's activities are connected to strengthening the deepening economic and cultural ties between the Philippines and Poland. Among these include holding regular meetings with Polish government officials on furthering economic relations, sponsoring showings of Philippine traditional culture in Polish museums, and promoting the country as a tourist destination for Poles. In addition to these activities, the embassy regularly holds events and other activities for Filipinos in Poland, including holding free Polish language classes for Overseas Filipino Workers, hosting community town halls on matters of importance, and organizing Filipino cultural events like poetry readings.

During the 2022 Russian invasion of Ukraine, the embassy was instrumental in the evacuation and repatriation of Filipinos in the war-torn country. It sent a consular team to Lviv in Western Ukraine and immediately established an emergency contact base in the city.

== See also ==
- Philippines–Poland relations
- Embassy of Poland, Manila
- Filipinos in Poland
- List of diplomatic missions of the Philippines
