= Embassy of the Philippines, Stockholm =

Diplomatic mission of the Philippines in Sweden

Embassy of the Philippines, Stockholm Pasuguan ng Pilipinas sa Estokolmo Filippinernas ambassad i Stockholm

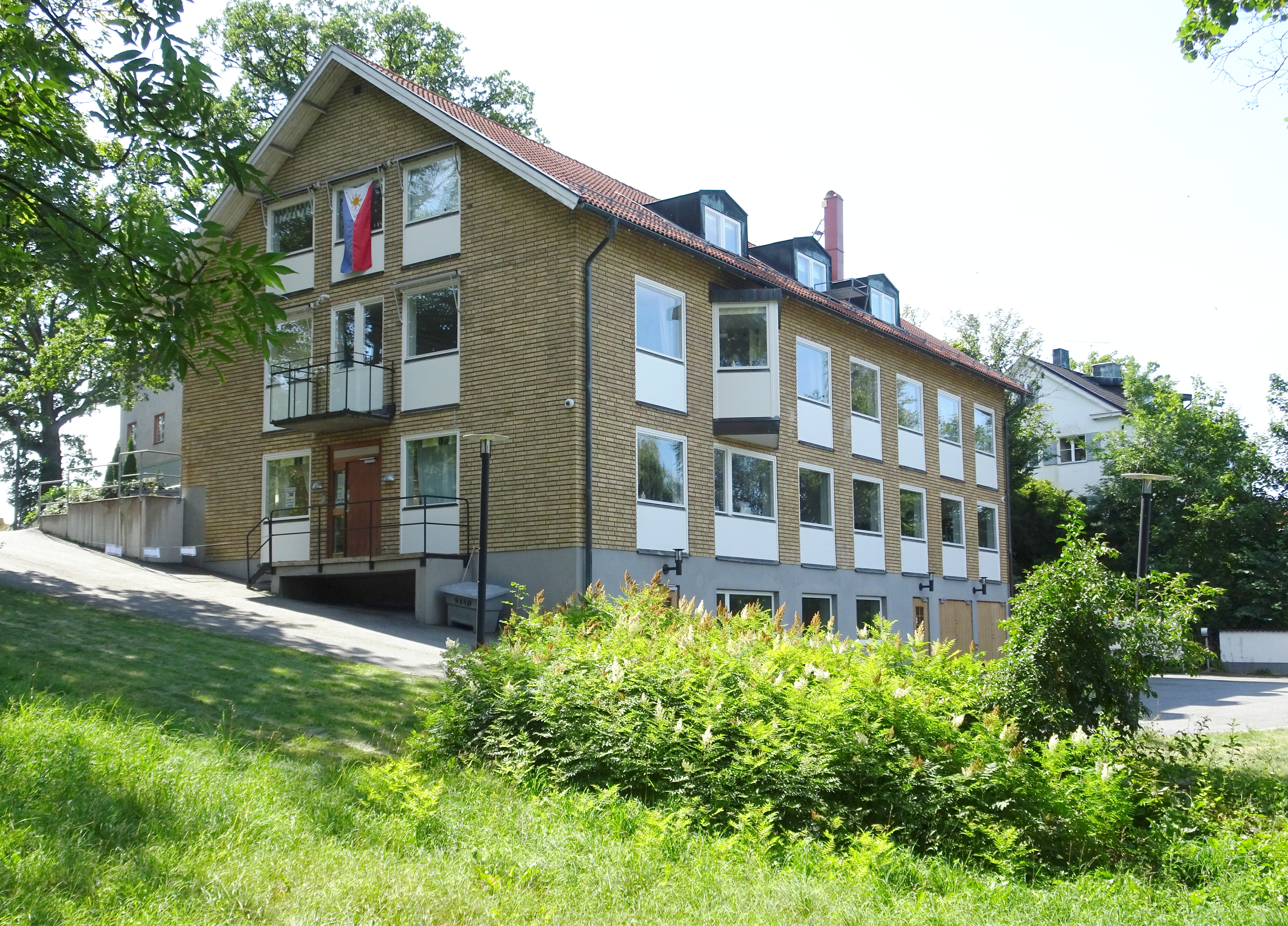
- Location: Stockholm
- Address: Grenstigen 2A, Lidingö, Stockholm County
- Coordinates: 59°22′4.3″N 18°6′57.4″E
- Ambassador: Patrick A. Chuasoto
- Website: http://stockholmpe.dfa.gov.ph

The Embassy of the Philippines in Stockholm is the diplomatic mission of the Republic of the Philippines to the Kingdom of Sweden. It is located on the island of Lidingö in Stockholm County, east of Stockholm city proper. Although the current embassy dates from 2020, the Philippines also maintained a previous resident embassy in Sweden between 1978 and 2012.

== History ==
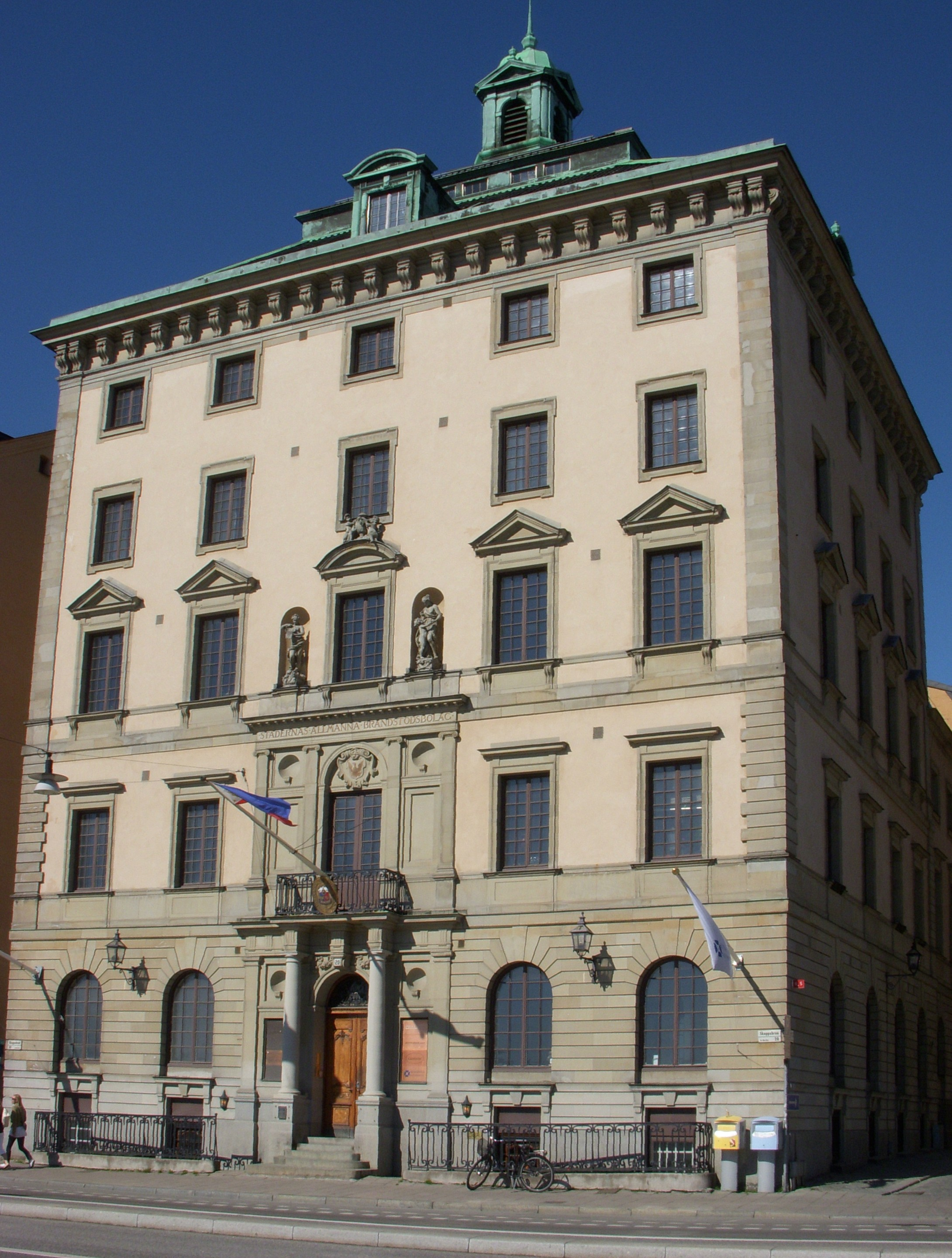
Prior to its closure in 2012, the embassy was located at Skeppsbron 20 in Gamla stan

The Philippines did not initially open a resident mission in Sweden when diplomatic relations between the two countries were established on January 17, 1947. An honorary consulate was first opened in 1970, and on November 9, 1978, José Manuel Stilianopoulos, then Philippine Ambassador to the United Kingdom, was accredited as the first non-resident Philippine ambassador to Sweden. The first physical resident embassy opened around a week later, headed by chargé d'affaires Rolando Libas, in Gamla stan, Stockholm's old town.

In 1982, Consuelo Arranz was appointed as the first resident Philippine ambassador to Sweden, serving until 1986. The Philippine Embassy in Stockholm at the time was the first Philippine diplomatic mission in the Nordic states, and when it opened it exercised jurisdiction over Denmark, Finland, Norway, and the Baltic states of Estonia, Latvia and Lithuania, in addition to Sweden. On April 30, 2007, jurisdiction over Denmark and Norway was transferred to a newly opened embassy in Oslo, while jurisdiction over Finland was transferred to a newly opened embassy in Helsinki on November 12, 2009, opening the same year as new embassies in Ireland and Portugal.

After a massive expansion of the Philippines' diplomatic presence abroad during the presidency of Gloria Macapagal Arroyo, in 2010 Senator Franklin Drilon questioned the need for embassies in countries with small Filipino communities, including a number of countries in Europe, and called for a review of the Philippines' diplomatic presence worldwide. This would lead to the closure of ten posts under Arroyo's successor, Benigno Aquino III, and ultimately to the closure of the Embassy on October 31, 2012. The closure was not without controversy: in February 2012, coinciding with celebrations commemorating the People Power Revolution, hundreds of people held a march in cold weather to protest the embassy's closure. Protesters called on President Aquino to reconsider his position as the local community was not consulted on the decision, especially considering the size of the local community in Sweden relative to other missions where there are smaller numbers of Filipinos, and Sweden's relative prosperity compared to other countries whose missions ought to be closed instead. A petition was also organized alongside similar movements in other affected countries, with signatures being gathered from Filipinos all over Sweden.

At the time, the embassy exercised jurisdiction over the Baltic states, which was subsequently transferred to the Philippine Embassy in Warsaw, and Sweden was placed under the jurisdiction of the Philippine Embassy in Oslo, which conducted monthly consular outreach visits. While there was no resident embassy in Sweden, relations were conducted through a reopened honorary consulate, led by Erik Belfrage, who led efforts to reopen the embassy.

By 2019, the Philippine government had begun considering reopening a resident mission in Sweden owing to deepening relations between the two countries, and Foreign Affairs Secretary Teodoro Locsin Jr. announced that the Philippine Embassy in Stockholm would reopen, part of an expansion of the country's diplomatic presence under Aquino's successor, Rodrigo Duterte. Later that year, a landing team arrived to set up the new embassy, and on May 15, 2020, the embassy was reopened to the public, four years after Sweden reopened its embassy in Manila. The embassy's reopening, however, was overshadowed by Belfrage's death the month before due to COVID-19 amidst a pandemic of the disease.

After initially operating from temporary offices along Olof Palme Street in central Stockholm, the embassy moved to a new, permanent chancery on the island of Lidingö on November 1, 2020. With the reopening of the Philippine Embassy in Helsinki, the Embassy’s lost jurisdiction over Finland. In 2025, the jurisdicition over Latvia was transferred from the Embassy of the Philippines in Warsaw to the Embassy of the Philippines in Sweden, with Ambassador Patrick A. Chuasoto presenting his Letters of Credence to Latvian President Edgars Rinkēvičs on 19 September 2025.

== Staff and activities ==
The Philippine Embassy in Stockholm is headed by Ambassador Patrick A. Chuasoto, who was appointed to the position by President Bongbong Marcos on November 16, 2024. Prior to his appointment as ambassador, Chuasoto, a career diplomat, was Assistant Secretary for Policy Planning in the Department of Foreign Affairs and prior to that served as Chargé d'Affaires/Deputy Chief of Mission at the Philippine Embassy in Washington, D.C. His appointment was confirmed by the Commission on Appointments on February 4, 2025, and he presented his credentials to King Carl XVI Gustaf on April 29, 2025.

The embassy currently serves 30,000 Filipinos in Sweden and 300 Filipinos in Latvia. Passport renewals were initially still handled by the Philippine Embassy in Oslo, ostensibly due to delays in receiving passport issuing equipment due to the COVID-19 pandemic, although it was able to handle all other consular transactions. The embassy officially began accepting passport applications on August 24, 2020.

== See also ==
- Philippines–Sweden relations
- List of diplomatic missions of the Philippines
