= Philippines–Poland relations =

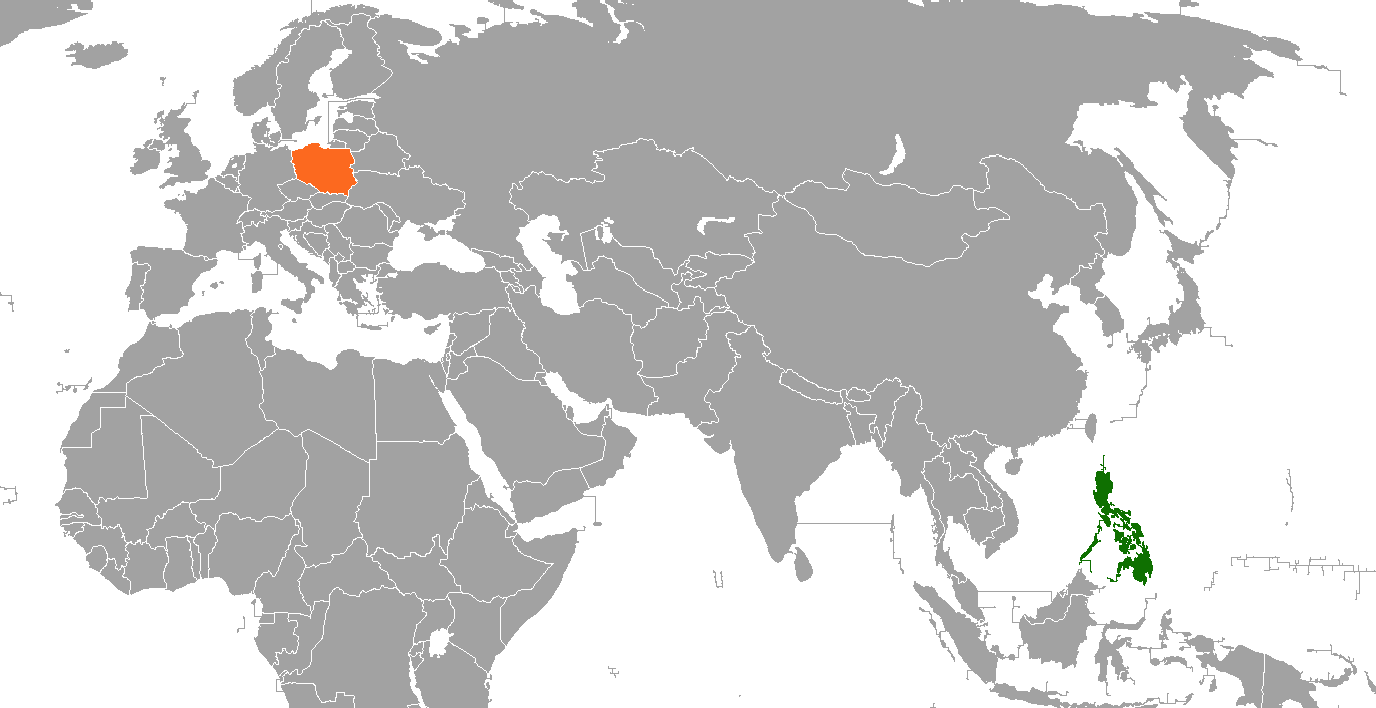

- Philippines: Poland

Diplomatic mission
- Embassy of the Philippines, Warsaw: Embassy of Poland, Manila

Envoy
- Ambassador Alan L. Deniega: Ambassador Katarzyna Wilkowiecka

Philippines–Poland relations are the bilateral relations between the Philippines and Poland. Formal diplomatic relations between the two countries were established on September 22, 1973, but contact between the two peoples dates back to the seventeenth century.

While relations between the two countries are largely defined by a shared religion, with both countries possessing predominant Roman Catholic populations with a strong devotion to Pope John Paul II, and a shared history of anti-authoritarian struggle, they are not as strong as Poland's relations with other countries in Southeast Asia — a state of affairs that has been defined by Tadeusz Iwiński as a relationship "that was broken by mistake". Polish president Karol Nawrocki's state visit to the Philippines in October 2026 marked the first official visit by a Polish head of state since diplomatic relations were established.

The Philippines maintains an embassy in Warsaw, while Poland maintains an embassy in Manila.

== History ==
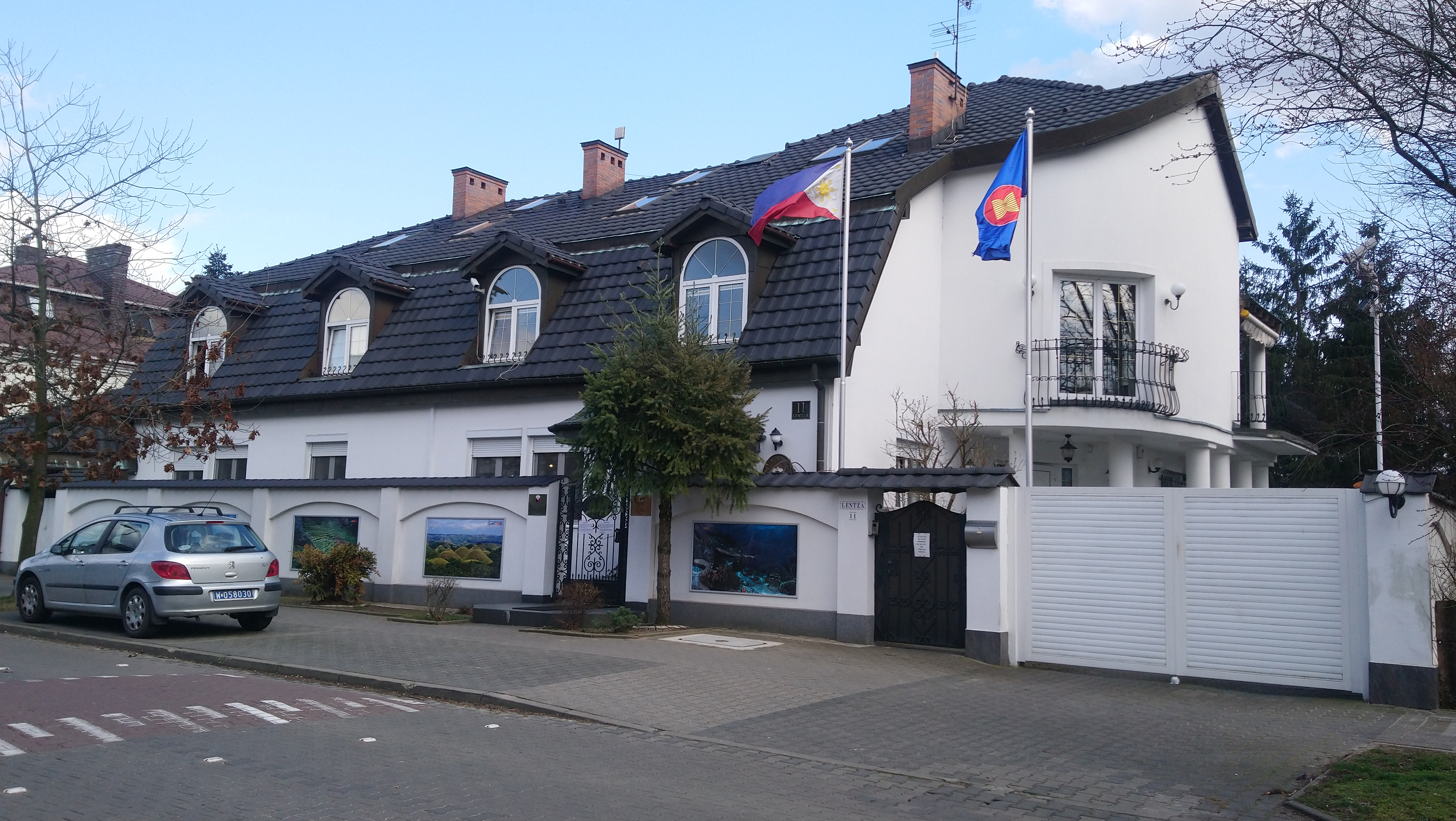
Embassy of the Philippines in Warsaw

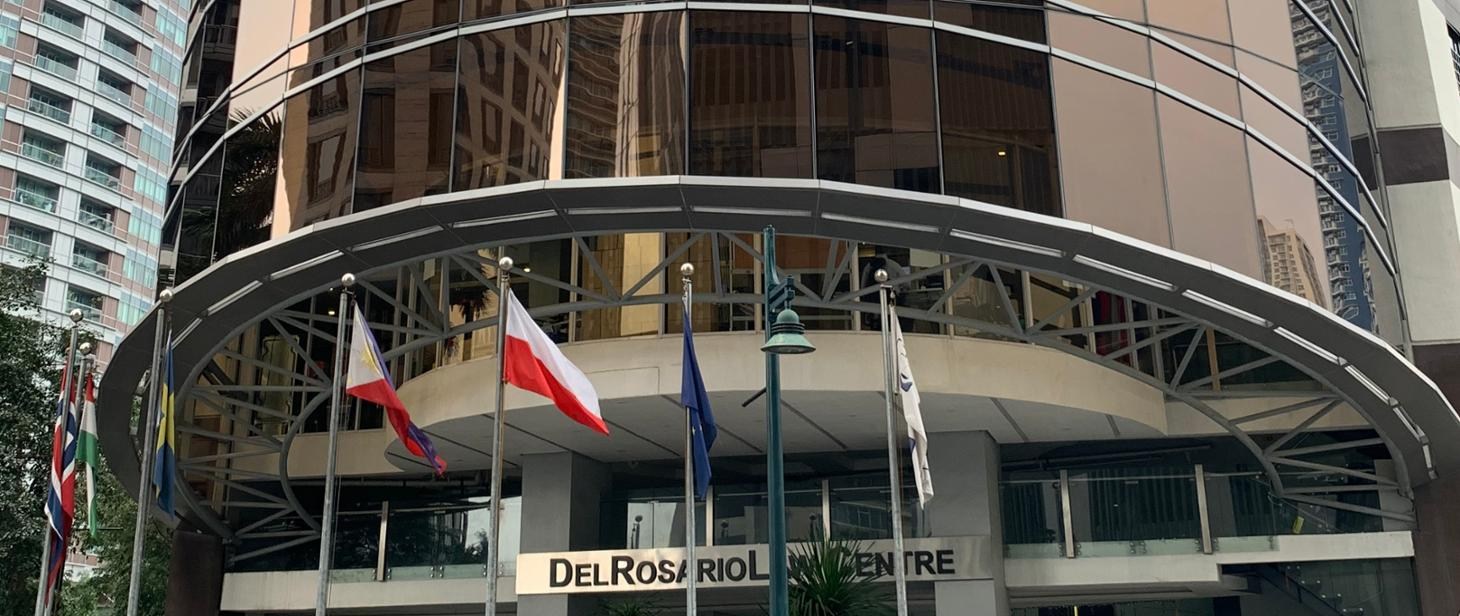
Embassy of Poland in Manila

Relations between the Philippines and Poland may be traced back to the Age of Discovery and the colonization of the Philippines by Spain. While there was an interaction between the two countries, however, any history of the Polish community in the Philippines prior to the end of the 19th century is virtually unknown, and even more so the history of Filipinos in Poland. Accounts of a Polish presence in the Philippines were recorded as early as 1618, but the first documented account of a Pole stepping into the Philippines was that of Wojciech Męciński, a Jesuit missionary from Kraków who participated in missionary activities in Japan, China and Vietnam, and who stayed in Manila for a few months in 1642.

The Philippine Revolution had aroused the interest of Poles, particularly those members of the Polish intelligentsia who were willing to denounce European colonialism. In 1898, Ignacy Radliński published an article in the Gazeta Warszawska entitled "Colonial Notes – the Philippine Islands" („Notatki kolonialne – Wyspy Filipińskie”), where he denounces the methods by which the Spanish colonized the Philippines.

During the American colonial period, there was a rapid growth in the local Polish community, although most people in the Philippines at the time who were of Polish descent were Polish Americans. Growing trade relations between Poland and Southeast Asia eventually led to the establishment of an honorary consulate in Manila on May 2, 1938, with Swiss businessman Frederick Zuellig serving as the first honorary consul. Prior to the establishment of the Polish consulate, Poles in the Philippines were under the diplomatic protection of the French consulate.

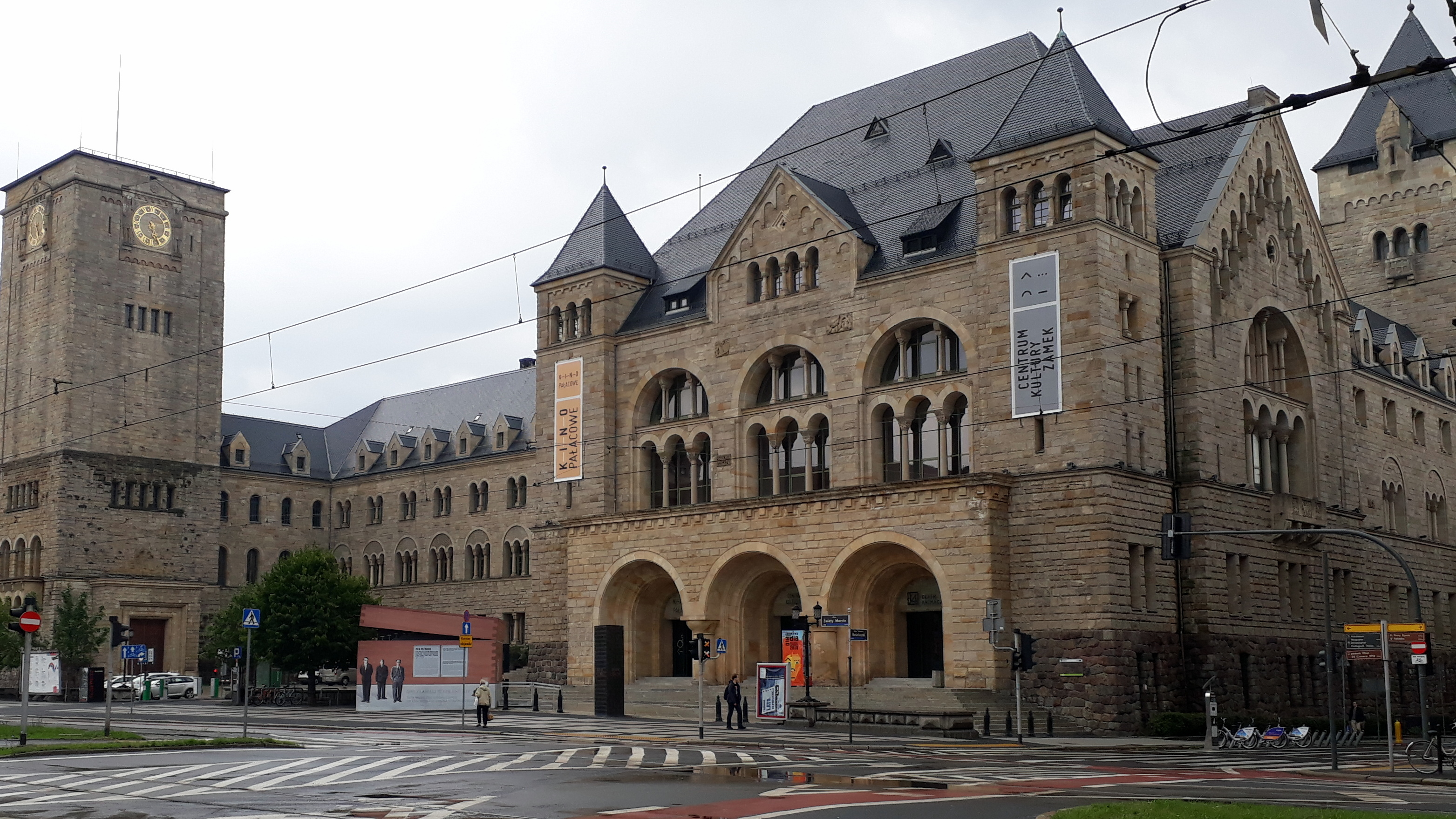
Imperial Castle, seat of the Honorary Consulate of the Philippines in Poznań

With Philippine independence from the United States in 1946 and the eventual establishment of the communist People's Republic of Poland in 1952, relations between the two countries were severed owing to political differences. However, following Soviet–American détente, relations between the two countries were normalized with the formal establishment of diplomatic relations on September 22, 1973, which culminated with the visit of former President Diosdado Macapagal to Poland in 1974, the first visit to the country by any member of the Philippine government.

The Philippines later established an embassy in Warsaw in 1990 but was closed in 1993. Poland established an embassy in Manila in 1993 but was closed the following year. The Philippine Embassy in Warsaw was reopened in 2009 and in early 2016, Poland announced that it would reopen its Manila embassy. The Polish embassy was subsequently reopened on January 4, 2018.

In 2013 in a few weeks Caritas Poland raised about 6.5 million PLN and the Polish Humanitarian Action raised about one million PLN to help the Philippines affected by the disastrous Typhoon Haiyan (Yolanda).

In November 2021, Poland donated 547,100 COVID-19 vaccines to the Philippines.

== High-level visits ==
Philippine president Bongbong Marcos and first lady Liza Araneta Marcos (right) hosts Polish president Karol Nawrocki and first lady Marta Nawrocka (left) at Malacañang Palace on 6 October 2026

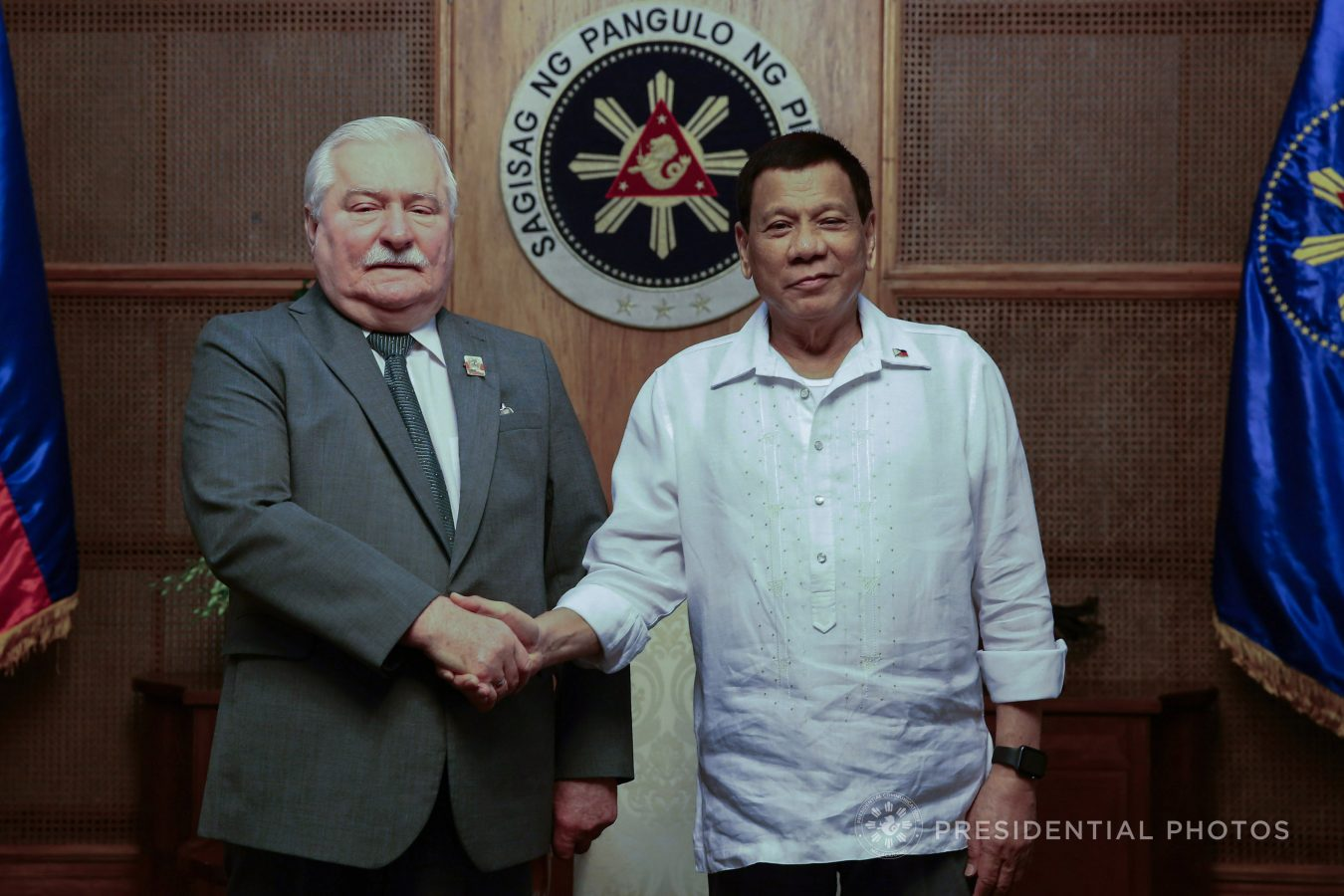
Philippine president Rodrigo Duterte meets former Polish president Lech Wałęsa in Malacañang Palace on 23 January 2018

A number of high-ranking officials of the Philippine government have visited Poland, most recently in 2008 with the visit of Foreign Secretary Alberto Romulo. The highest-ranking official from the Philippines to have visited Poland is Gloria Macapagal Arroyo, who visited the country in 2000 while serving as Vice President.

In July 2005, Prime Minister Marek Belka visited the Philippines, the first time a sitting Polish head of government visited the country. Former presidents Lech Wałęsa and Aleksander Kwaśniewski have also visited the Philippines in a personal capacity, giving talks on Poland's political experiences.

On 23 January 2018, Wałęsa met with President Rodrigo Duterte and a number of government officials at the Malacañang Palace, the first meeting between the heads of state of both countries.

On 5–8 October 2026, President Karol Nawrocki visited the Philippines, the first time a sitting Polish head of state visited the country since the establishment of diplomatic relations between the two countries in 1973. During his meeting with President Bongbong Marcos in Manila, the two leaders agreed to pursue a strategic partnership aimed at expanding bilateral cooperation in political, defense, economic, technological, and other areas.

== Security relations ==
In 2010, the Armed Forces of the Philippines announced the purchase of eight PZL W-3 Sokół helicopters worth ₱2.8 billion (200 million zł, €50 million), the start of a ₱150 billion effort to modernize the equipment of the Philippine military. This purchase was the first time since 1989 that the Philippine government has procured brand new military helicopters. The purchase was not without controversy: Arroyo's successor, Benigno Aquino III, criticized them as "useless", later declaring that the Philippines will no longer procure further Sokół helicopters, and in 2013, Defense Secretary Voltaire Gazmin declared that this would be the last time the Philippines would purchase Polish military equipment.

Five years later under President Duterte, Aquino's successor, Defense Secretary Delfin Lorenzana, who succeeded Gazmin, confirmed that the Philippine government would purchase a fleet of American Sikorsky S-70 Black Hawk helicopters, which was finalized the following year as a deal between the Philippine and Polish governments at a total cost of ₱12.1 billion ($241 million). Manufactured by PZL Mielec, thereby going around Duterte's promise not to purchase U.S.-made military equipment, the first helicopters arrived on November 9, 2020, with the remaining units arriving by the first quarter of 2021.

In addition to equipment purchases, the Polish government is also pursuing a defense cooperation agreement between the two governments' defense ministries.

== Economic relations ==
Economic relations between Poland and the Philippines are mostly limited to trade, and although the value of trade between the two countries is not large, it is growing. Trade between the two countries reached $397.7 million in 2016, with the balance of trade heavily in favour of the Philippines. Polish products exported to the Philippines include dairy products, mechanical equipment and paper, while 70% of Philippine exports to Poland is composed of electronics. Poland is also a growing market for Philippine furniture exports, with trade between the two countries in furniture increasing by an average of 10.5% between 2005 and 2009 despite having exported only $457,000 worth of furniture products to Poland in 2009. In 2008, the Philippine government temporarily ordered a ban on Polish poultry imports in order to prevent the spread of avian influenza, which at the time did not affect local poultry stocks.

There is minimal Polish investment in the country, largely due to the prevailing investment climate which discourages foreign entry into the Philippine economy. Despite this, however, the Polish government has expressed confidence in the Philippines' economic potential. This was expressed in particular when Poland extended a $140 million credit facility to the Philippine government in 2006 for the purchase of new defense equipment, with then-Defense Minister Radosław Sikorski citing the Philippines' ability to repay the loan. In 2012, the Kraków-based Can-Pack Group acquired 35% of San Miguel Corporation's aluminum packing subsidiary, and a Polish company has also participated in the bidding process for new Philippine license plates.

The Philippines also has investments in Poland: International Container Terminal Services Inc. operates the Baltic Container Terminal in Gdynia, having been awarded a twenty-year management contract in 2003.

== Cultural relations ==
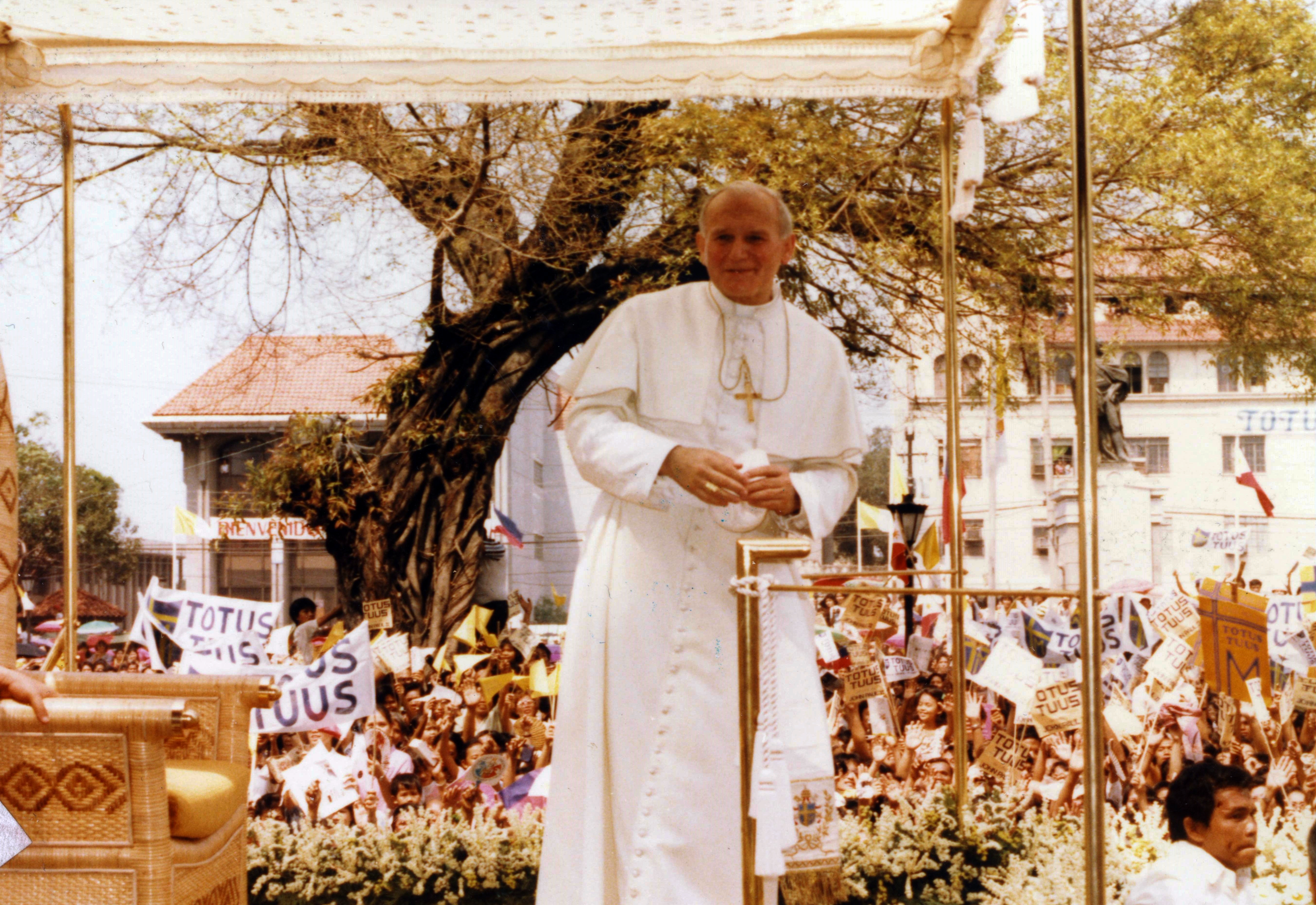
Pope John Paul II in Intramuros, Manila in 1981

A number of Filipino films have been exhibited at Polish film festivals. Films like The Blossoming of Maximo Oliveros and On the Job have been screened at the Warsaw International Film Festival, while Norte, the End of History, directed by Lav Diaz, was screened at the New Horizons Film Festival in Wrocław. Filipinos have also appeared on Polish television shows such as Dzień Dobry TVN. A notable instance of a Filipino appearing on Polish television was the third-place finish of Alexander Martinez in the second season of Mam talent!.

The Philippine Embassy has also sponsored exhibitions of Filipino painters, most recently exhibiting the Primeval series by Rodney Yap. Books by Filipino authors have also been translated into Polish, including three books by parapsychologist Jaime Licauco.

== Labor and migration ==
As of 2011, there are 520 Filipinos currently resident in Poland, mostly residing temporarily. They are employed either in the banking sector, in the hospitality industry, as domestic helpers, or as Catholic clergy. A number are also students: twelve Filipinos have studied at the University of Warsaw from 2010 to 2013 under the European Union's Erasmus Mundus program. A portal for Filipinos in Poland, Pinoys in Poland, is maintained by Ronaldo "Dondon" Farrales.

A scandal arose in 2009 when it was discovered that several overseas Filipino workers complained of poor working conditions in Poland, including docked wages and contract substitution. 49 overseas Filipino workers were repatriated by the Overseas Workers Welfare Administration because of these complaints, and the Department of Foreign Affairs at one point advised Poland-bound Filipino workers to proceed with caution due to these conditions, even urging those who were headed to the country to work as mushroom pickers to not leave the country due to complaints from Filipinos already employed there in that profession. The situation has improved, however: in 2011, the Philippine Overseas Employment Administration listed Poland as one of 76 countries considered to be "friendly" to the concerns of overseas Filipino workers.

Data from the National Statistics Office shows that as of the 2010 census, there are 93 persons in the Philippines who claim to have Polish citizenship, mostly living in Manila. Similar to the Pinoys in Poland portal, a portal for Poles in the Philippines, Polacy na Filipinach, is maintained by Paweł Usarek.

== See also ==
- Foreign relations of the Philippines
- Foreign relations of Poland
- Filipinos in Poland
- Polish settlement in the Philippines
- Embassy of the Philippines, Warsaw
- Embassy of Poland, Manila
