= Philippine population by country =

This table shows the Philippine population by country of citizenship, the number of foreigners residing in the Philippines as recorded during the 2010 census. the foreigners in the Philippines can be both expats or immigrants.

Population by country of citizenship
Country	Citizens
Total	92,097,978
Afghanistan	1,028
Albania	98
Algeria	389
Andorra	18
Angola	64
Antigua and Barbuda	11
Argentina	125
Armenia	114
Australia	3,364
Austria	424
Azerbaijan	16
Bahamas	9
Bahrain	94
Bangladesh	134
Barbados	13
Belarus	65
Belgium	449
Belize	17
Benin	3
Bhutan	26
Bolivia	30
Bosnia and Herzegovina	21
Botswana	9
Brazil	137
Brunei Darussalam	69
Bulgaria	17
Burkina Faso	6
Burundi	1
Cambodia	33
Cameroon	35
Canada	4,689
Cape Verde	110
Central African Republic	17
Chad	6
Chile	79
China	28,750
Colombia	106
Comoros	5
Congo	446
Congo, Democratic Republic of the	24
Costa Rica	33
Côte d'Ivoire	0
Croatia	12
Cuba	9
Cyprus	50
Czech Republic	14
Denmark	373
Djibouti	11
Dominica	18
Dominican Republic	14
East Timor	119
Ecuador	387
Egypt	136
El Salvador	1
Equatorial Guinea	11
Eritrea	40
Estonia	1
Ethiopia	69
Fiji	7
Finland	95
France	1,015
Gabon	6
Gambia, The	8
Georgia	32
Germany	3,189
Ghana	29
Greece	129
Grenada	5
Guatemala	29
Guinea	2
Guinea-Bissau	19
Guyana	8
Haiti	28
Honduras	17
Hungary	206
Iceland	46
India	8,963
Indonesia	2,784
Iran	494
Iraq	60
Ireland	364
Israel	518
Italy	1,459
Jamaica	24
Japan	11,583
Jordan	150
Kazakhstan	28
Kenya	46
Kiribati	75
Korea, North	4,847
Korea, South	5,818
Kosovo	29
Kuwait	144
Kyrgyzstan	5
Laos	13
Latvia	1
Lebanon	113
Lesotho	7
Liberia	3
Libya	41
Liechtenstein	1
Lithuania	5
Luxembourg	26
Macedonia	55
Madagascar	2
Malawi	14
Malaysia	668
Maldives	2
Mali	7
Malta	8
Marshall Islands	11
Mauritania	1
Mauritius	2
Mexico	123
Micronesia	21
Moldova	0
Monaco	3
Mongolia	6
Montenegro	3
Morocco	5
Mozambique	14
Myanmar	355
Namibia	1
Nauru	2
Nepal	58
Netherlands, The	408
New Zealand	324
Nicaragua	9
Niger	7
Nigeria	162
Northern Ireland	13
Norway	550
Oman	344
Pakistan	421
Palau	29
Palestinian State	57
Panama	14
Papua New Guinea	51
Paraguay	20
Peru	94
Philippines	91,920,610
Poland	93
Portugal	51
Qatar	102
Romania	30
Russia	56
Rwanda	12
Samoa	16
San Marino	9
São Tomé and Príncipe	4
Saudi Arabia	618
Senegal	66
Serbia	4
Seychelles	0
Sierra Leone	4
Singapore	691
Slovakia	0
Slovenia	13
Solomon Islands	1
Somalia	19
South Africa	685
Spain	3,325 (in 2013)
Sri Lanka	146
St. Kitts and Nevis	15
St. Lucia	1
St. Vincent and The Grenadines	3
Sudan	53
Suriname	106
Swaziland	56
Sweden	510
Switzerland	871
Syria	53
Taiwan	1,536
Tajikistan	25
Tanzania	9
Thailand	287
Togo	26
Tonga	20
Trinidad and Tobago	55
Tunisia	479
Turkey	741
Turkmenistan	26
Tuvalu	38
Uganda	39
Ukraine	31
United Arab Emirates	364
United Kingdom of Great Britain	3,500 (Note: Includes population of Wales (9), Scotland (108) and Northern Ireland (13) which were recorded separately)
United States of America	29,959
Uruguay	11
Uzbekistan	30
Vanuatu	21
Vatican City (Holy See)	4
Venezuela	7
Vietnam	348
Western Sahara	0
Yemen	70
Zaire	4
Zambia	6
Zimbabwe	9
Others	1,617
Not reported	43,940

== See also ==
- Demographics of the Philippines
- Ethnic groups in the Philippines
- Philippine Statistics Authority
- Philippine Census of Population and Housing
