= Norway–Philippines relations =

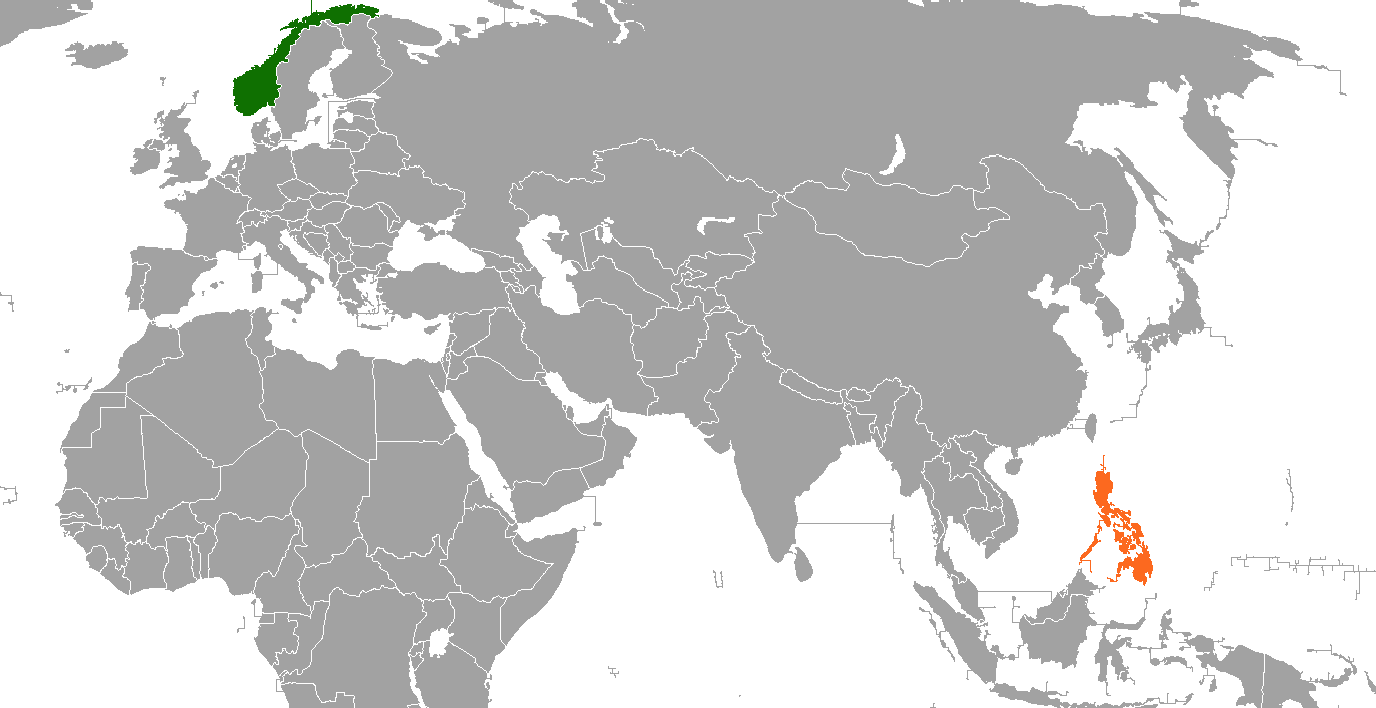

- Norway: Philippines

Norway–Philippines relations refers to the bilateral relations between Norway and the Philippines. Norway has an embassy in Manila. The Philippines has an embassy in Oslo.

== History ==
Formal relations between Norway and the Philippines was established on March 2, 1948. Nikolai Aal was the first diplomat to represent Norway in the Philippines who served as a non-resident ambassador based in Nanking, China. Norway was represented by a Consulate, later upgraded as a Consulate General, in Manila from 1952 to 1956. A Norwegian embassy was established in 1967.

Until 1986, the Philippine embassy in London had jurisdiction over Norway. In June 1986, responsibility over the bilateral ties was transferred to the Philippine embassy in Stockholm, Sweden. The Philippines later established an embassy in Oslo, Norway on April 30, 2007.

On June 15, 2018, the Presidential Communications Operations Office of Philippine president Rodrigo Duterte called the Kingdom of Norway as "Norwegia". The calling was made during the retirement of the Norwegian ambassador to the Philippines. The "Norwegia" tag has since been corrected, where the PCOO called it a "typo". Netizens afterwards pointed out that the budget of the office is far too large for the communications office to wrongfully rename a sovereign country.

== Security ties ==
Norway is involved in the peace process in the Philippines relating to the Moro and Communist insurgencies. Norway is a member country of the International Monitoring Team for the GPH-MILF Peace Process. Norway is also the third country facilitator for the GPH-CPP-NPA-NDF Peace Process.

== Trade relations ==
During a bilateral meeting between Norwegian Prime Minister Jens Stoltenberg and President Benigno Aquino III in Vientiane, Laos, Stoltenberg said that the opening of the Arctic may lead to the possibility of Norway opening trade routes with the Philippines to import products such as mangoes and bananas from the Asian country.

Total trade between Norway and the Philippines amounted to US$73 million in 2011.

== Labor relations ==
As of 2012, there are around 17,500 Filipino seafarers employed in several Norwegian-owned and operated vessels. During a bilateral meeting between Norwegian Prime Minister Stoltenberg and President Aquino in Vientiane, Laos, Stoltenberg stated the possibility of facilitating the entry of Filipino medical workers and other highly skilled professional in Norway.

== Norwegians in the Philippines ==
There are about 3,000 Norwegians in the Philippines, either engaged in business, involved in charitable work or residing in the country with their families.

== Filipinos in Norway ==
There are approximately 25,000 Filipinos in Norway.

== See also ==
- Foreign relations of Norway
- Foreign relations of the Philippines
