= Lydia B. Echauz =

Lydia Balatbat-Echauz is the tenth president (2002-2012) of Far Eastern University in Manila, Philippines.

== Education ==
Lydia Balatbat-Echauz holds a Bachelor of Arts degree in Economics from St. Theresa's College, a Master of Business Administration from Ateneo de Manila University, and a Doctor of Business Administration from De La Salle University.

== Board memberships ==
As the Far Eastern University President, Echauz is also a member of the Board of Directors of FEU-East Asia College, FEU-FERN College, FERN Realty Corporation, Nicanor Reyes Sr. Memorial Foundation, Philippine Association of Colleges and Universities, Association of Women Presidents/Chancellors of Private Colleges and Universities, and Expitar.

== Management experience ==
Echauz has served as Dean of the De La Salle Graduate School of Business; Executive Director of the Jaime V. Ongpin Institute of Business and Government from 1989 to 1994; and Corporate Affairs Consultant of SM Prime Holdings, Inc.
