= Far Eastern University Institute of Tourism and Hotel Management =

Institute of Tourism and Hotel Management
- Established: 2011
- Dean: Harold Bueno, PhD
- Location: Nicanor Reyes Hall, No. 830 Quezon Blvd., Sampaloc, Manila, Metro Manila, Philippines
- Campus: Far Eastern University - Manila
- Colors: Pink
- Website: www.feu.edu.ph/institute-of-tourism-and-hotel-management/

The Far Eastern University – Institute of Tourism and Hotel Management, or simply ITHM, is the academic institute offering culinary and hospitality programs of the Far Eastern University. Established in 2011, ITHM teaches theory and practice in hospitality and tourism management aligned with international standards.

The Institute's Tourism and Hotel and Restaurant Management programs are accredited Level III by the Philippine Association of Colleges and Universities on Accreditation (PACUCOA). ITHM is also a member of the Pacific Asia Travel Association (PATA) and an associate of the International Centre for Excellence in Tourism and Hospitality Education (THE-ICE).

== Brief history ==
In the 2000s, FEU offered a Bachelor of Science in Commerce major in Tourism Management under the Institute of Accounts, Business and Finance. The ITHM was then formed to handle the new Bachelor of Science in Tourism Management program (replacing the BS Commerce major in Tourism Management) and Bachelor of Science in Hotel and Restaurant Management, which was growing in student population at that time.

The Institute formally opened at the second semester of SY 2010–2011 with Reymund Mercado as its first dean. In 2012, Dr. Melinda D. Torres became the second Dean of ITHM after the founding dean. Her administration focused on improving academic quality, international presence, industry relevance, and professional skills, setting the stage for the Institute's growth and recognition.

Under her leadership, ITHM reached important quality assurance milestones. The Institute earned Level II accreditation from the Philippine Association of Colleges and Universities Commission on Accreditation (PACUCOA). It also boosted its global reputation by joining the International Centre of Excellence in Tourism and Hospitality Education (THE-ICE) and received recognition from the Asia Pacific Institute for Events Management (APIEM). These acknowledgments highlighted the quality and relevance of its tourism, hospitality, and events management programs.

Dr. Torres supported competency-based education and prepared students for the industry by expanding professional certifications and skills training programs. During her time, ITHM engaged with TESDA certification initiatives, enabling students to earn industry-recognized qualifications along with their academic degrees.

A key achievement of her administration was the growth of international internship opportunities for students. In 2012, ITHM formed international internship partnerships in Malaysia with Open University Malaysia and the Centre for Logistics and Management Studies-Malaysia, offering students cross-cultural training and industry experience. These programs later expanded to include placements and training opportunities in Vietnam, Thailand, and the United States, greatly improving the global exposure and employability of FEU-ITHM students. This international internship program became a standout feature of the Institute and reinforced FEU's goal of producing globally competitive tourism and hospitality professionals.

The accomplishments during Dr. Torres's tenure built a strong foundation for internationalization, accreditation, and industry involvement, setting ITHM up for continued growth and recognition in the future.

Dr. Joy Sheelah Baraero-Era served as the third Dean of the Institute of Tourism and Hotel Management from 2018 to 2023. Her administration focused on strengthening the institution, developing research, and maintaining resilience during the challenges of the COVID-19 pandemic.

Building on the earlier foundations, Dr. Era led initiatives for faculty development and research productivity. During her time, the Institute maintained and enhanced its national and international recognitions while expanding opportunities for both students and faculty.

One noteworthy achievement of her administration was the successful renewal of FEU-ITHM’s status as an APIEM International Centre of Excellence, validating that the Institute's events and MICE curriculum met international standards. Although this recognition was established before her deanship, its retention showed the Institute's ongoing commitment to quality under her leadership. The BS Hospitality and Tourism Management program also achieved PACUCOA Level III Accreditation, further emphasizing the Institute's dedication to quality education.

Dr. Era improved industry partnerships and professional certifications. Under her guidance, FEU-ITHM received Gold Distinction recognition from the American Hotel and Lodging Educational Institute (AHLEI) as a Certified Guest Service Professional (CGSP) Property, reflecting the Institute's commitment to service excellence and industry-aligned training.

In the fields of research and international engagement, she represented FEU at various international tourism and hospitality education forums, enhancing the Institute's academic profile. The Institute expanded its involvement in global research and academic networks and strengthened its presence in regional tourism and hospitality education initiatives. Through these efforts, ITHM continued to produce graduates who were academically prepared, ready for the industry, and competitive globally.

Dr. Era's leadership solidified the Institute's reputation as one of the leading tourism and hospitality schools in the Philippines and prepared it for future growth and international engagement.

In 2023, Dr. Harold Bernardo Bueno became the fourth Dean of the Far Eastern University Institute of Tourism and Hotel Management (ITHM). Under his leadership, the Institute achieved significant milestones in academic innovation, quality assurance, internationalization, industry engagement, community development, and inclusivity.

One of his major achievements was securing CHED recognition for the Master of Science in Tourism and Hospitality Management (MSTHM) Academic Track. Under his direction, FEU also became the first institution in the Philippines to offer the MSTHM Professional Track (Non-Thesis), aimed at working industry professionals, with new specializations in Tourism Leadership and Governance and Culinology.

Dr. Bueno drove the Institute's efforts toward academic excellence through quality assurance initiatives. During his term, both the Bachelor of Science in Tourism Management and Bachelor of Science in Hospitality Management earned ASEAN University Network-Quality Assurance (AUN-QA) Certified Program status. The BS Tourism Management program also achieved PACUCOA Level III Re-accreditation, reinforcing the Institute's commitment to quality education.

Recognizing the evolving needs of students and the industry, he promoted the expansion of academic offerings by introducing three new degree programs: the BS Tourism Management Open University Program, the BS Airline Management Program, and the BA in International Culinary Arts Management. These programs are designed as three-year degree pathways that provide more accessible and industry-responsive educational opportunities to be offered in 2027.

Dr. Bueno also focused on enhancing the Institute's international internship program. During his tenure, FEU-ITHM expanded its global internship opportunities, allowing student placements in Singapore after reopening the internship pathways for Filipino students after more than a decade. The Institute also broadened its international internship network in Taiwan and Dubai, giving students greater global exposure, intercultural skills, and relevant industry experience.

To improve student employability and professional readiness, he made the Filipino Brand of Service Excellence (FBSE) training and Basic Life Support (BLS) Certification prerequisites for internships, ensuring that ITHM graduates meet industry expectations in both technical skills and service excellence.

His leadership also helped grow the Institute's enterprise initiatives by expanding Café Alfredo outlets, Alfredo Catering, and Alfredo Bistro. These efforts provided experiential learning opportunities while promoting entrepreneurship within the Institute.

In addition to academic and enterprise development, Dr. Bueno championed community-focused innovation. He led community product development initiatives through the Institute's extension programs and created Mabuhay Treats, a platform to showcase products developed by partner communities. This initiative provided meaningful livelihood opportunities while encouraging sustainable community involvement.

As a strong supporter of Filipino identity and cultural heritage, he oversaw the completion and institutionalization of the ITHM handwoven scarf and necktie project, developed with Mangyan weaving communities. This project supports indigenous livelihoods and allows students to wear symbols of Filipino craftsmanship, reinforcing the Institute's identity and commitment to Filipino culture.

Dr. Bueno also championed inclusion through progressive policies recognizing student diversity and self-expression. Under his leadership, students could wear uniforms that align with their gender identity and use their chosen names on official nameplates, fostering a more inclusive and respectful learning environment.

His focus on academic enrichment led to the appointment of four guest professors from international partner institutions, strengthening the Institute's global perspective and academic partnerships.

Currently, Dr. Bueno is leading the BS Tourism Management and BS Hospitality Management programs in their application for CHED Center of Excellence recognition. He has also been key in the approval and upcoming establishment of the FEU Aircraft Simulation Laboratory, a state-of-the-art facility that will improve education in aviation and airline management.

These achievements took place during Dr. Bueno's term as Dean, with the support of the University Administration, and contributions from past and current Academic Managers, faculty members, professional staff, industry partners, alumni, students, and community stakeholders.

== Degree programs ==
=== Undergraduate ===
- Bachelor of Science in Hospitality Management
  - Culinary Arts and Kitchen Operations
  - Cruise Line Management
  - Hotel Industry Analytics
  - Hotel and Resorts Operations
- Bachelor of Science in Tourism Management
  - Travel and Tours
  - Airline Operations and Management
  - Tourism Foreign Relations and Diplomacy
  - Tourism Digital Content Creation and Marketing
  - Tourism and Hospitality Sustainability Leadership

== Facilities ==
ITHM is housed within the Alfredo Reyes Hall, with purpose-designed professional standard kitchen, dining facilities, bar and demonstration rooms. Faculty are seasoned industry practitioners.

=== Café Alfredo ===
Café Alfredo is a fully-functioning in-house café and restaurant in the Alfredo Reyes Hall managed by the HRM students of ITHM. It serves as a training ground for the students, with a facility for food service and management. In 2023, it opened a second branch in the university's Makati campus.
