= Felixberto =

Felixberto is a given name. Notable people with the name include:

- Felixberto Camacho Flores (1921–1985), Roman Catholic Archbishop of Agaña
- Felixberto C. Sta. Maria (1922–2006), Filipino educator and author
- Felixberto Serrano (1906–1990), Filipino politician and diplomat
- Felixberto Urbiztondo (1941–2018), Filipino lawyer and politician
- Felixberto Verano (born 1905), Filipino politician
