= Far Eastern University =

Private university in Manila, Philippines

- Pamantasan ng Malayong Silanganan (Filipino)
- University Seal
- Former names: Far Eastern College (1919-1922); Institute of Accountancy (1928–1929); Institute of Accounts, Business and Finance (1929–1933)
- Motto: "Be Brave"
- Core Values: Fortitude, Excellence, and Uprightness
- Type: Private coeducational research university
- Established: April 1, 1928 (98 years and 222 days)
- Founder: Nicanor B. Reyes, Sr.
- Academic affiliations: ASAIHL; AUN; AACSB; ACCA; UMAP; PAASCU
- Endowment: ₱4.1 billion (US$ 72 million) (2022)
- Chairman: Aurelio Reyes Montinola, III
- President: Juan Miguel Reyes Montinola
- Vice-president: Maria Teresa P. Tinio
- Academic staff: 2,621
- Undergraduates: 39,361 including subsidiaries
- Location: No. 851 N. Reyes, Sr. Street, Sampaloc, 1015, Manila, Metro Manila, Philippines; 14°36′14″N 120°59′08″E
- Campus: Main campus FEU Manila & FEU Tech 5 hectares (50,000 m^{2}) Satellite campus FEU Makati 1.5 hectares (15,000 m^{2}); Institute of Law
- Hymn: The FEU Hymn by Nick Joaquin
- Colors: Green Gold
- Nickname: Tamaraws
- Sporting affiliations: UAAP
- Mascots: TamTam and Sari
- Website: feu.edu.ph

The FEU Hymn
- Written by Nick Joaquin, composed by Daniel Fajardo, and performed by the FEU Chorale: file; help
- Location in Manila Location in Metro Manila Location in Luzon Location in the Philippines

Far Eastern University (Filipino: Pamantasan ng Malayong Silanganan), also referred to by its acronym FEU, is a private research non-sectarian university in Manila, Philippines. Created by the merger of Far Eastern College and Institute of Accounts, Business and Finance, FEU became a university in 1934 during the term of its first president, Dr. Nicanor B. Reyes, Sr.

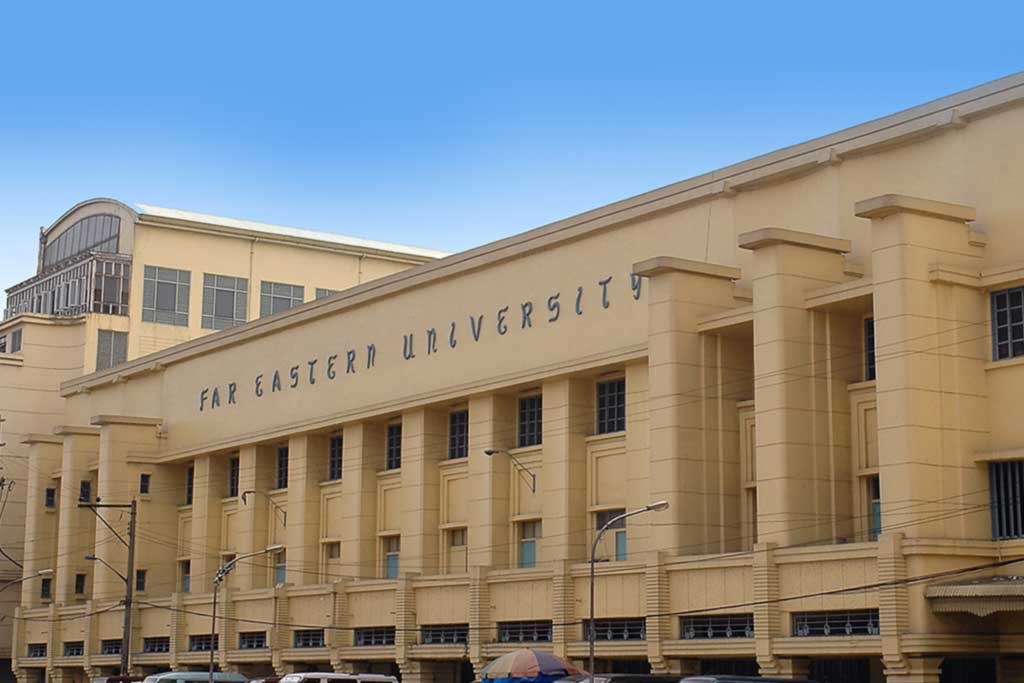
The iconic Nicanor B. Reyes Hall No. 830 Quezon Blvd., Sampaloc, Manila

FEU Centennial logo

The first accountancy school for Filipinos, the university has expanded its course offerings to the arts and sciences, architecture, fine arts, education, engineering, computer studies, graduate studies, tourism and hotel management, law, nursing, and medicine. FEU has nine schools located in Metro Manila, Cavite, Rizal, and Pampanga. It offers programs from elementary, secondary, tertiary, to graduate school.

FEU Manila comprises several institutes that offer specific programs. The accountancy program, along with its other undergraduate programs, have received the highest Level IV accreditation from the Philippine Association of Colleges and Universities Commission on Accreditation (PACUCOA). The Commission on Higher Education (CHED) has also granted it as a Center of Development in Business Administration and a Center of Excellence for Teacher Education.

== History ==
=== Pre-war ===
The university was founded through a merger of the Far Eastern College and the Institute of Accounts, Business and Finance (IABF) in November 1933. Far Eastern College, founded in 1919 by Vicente F. Fabella (the first Filipino CPA), Nicanor Maronilla-Seva, Francisco Africa, Pedro Cortez, and Salvador Unson, was a commerce and liberal arts school in Arlegui St., Quiapo; while the IABF had been established (originally under the name Institute of Accountancy) by Dr. Francisco T. Dalupan, Sr. and Dr. Nicanor B. Reyes, Sr., then head of the Department of Economics at the University of the Philippines, with a number of other prominent educators in 1928.

From the initial 117 students, population grew to 11,000 just before the war. IABF had been originally predominately used by night students, and the new university, which was supported by the tuition provided by its students rather than government grants, soon demonstrated that a private university was financially sustainable in the Philippines. FEU is the 6th oldest university in the Philippines and the 4th oldest private, nonsectarian university in the country based on its extant university charter.

In the early 1930s, FEU was housed in a converted tobacco factory (La Oriente Fabrica de Tabacos y Compania; boundary of Quiapo and Sampaloc district lots) already present on the 4 hectares (9.9 acres) property lot owned by Sulucan Hill Subdivision. Due to the widening of the street that became Quezon Blvd (formerly El Dorano Street)., the original building designed and built by Pablo S. Antonio, Sr., National Artist for Architecture, was demolished and had to be rebuilt on a bigger scale on what is the present campus of FEU.

In 1934, the first four institutes, Accounts, Business and Finance (IABF), Arts and Sciences (IAS), Law (IL), and Education (IE) were founded. Two years later, the Institute of Technology (FIT) was also established.

Dr. Nicanor B. Reyes, Sr., as the founding president of the university, spent his early years establishing the courses and programs for FEU. For the campus, he commissioned Ar. Pablo S. Antonio, Sr. to construct the main building and several structures for the university. In 1940, the Nicanor B. Reyes Sr. Hall, which would later house the main library at third level and Institute of Accounts, Business and Finance, opened. Two other buildings by Antonio, the Girl's High School Building and Boy's High School Building followed. Enrollment had blown with approximately 10,000 registered students and an international student population of 400. Former Philippine President Manuel L. Quezon hailed and called FEU "the best non-sectarian institution in the country."

In 1941, FEU also had the first ROTC Quartermaster and ROTC Finance Units in the Philippines. During the American colonial period, the FEU ROTC was notable for having the 1st Coastal Artillery Unit in the Philippines. During World War II, FEU cadets fought in Bataan with the Second Infantry Division. FEU constituted the majority of cadets who received armor training. These cadets were trained to operate the American M5 light tank. At the time that the FEU's coast artillery unit was formed, the Philippine Army's Coast Artillery was equipped with the Canon de 155 mm GPF. During the Philippine–American War, the Philippine coast artillery had one 150mm Ordóñez guns. It is said that of all the Philippine colleges whose students and alumni volunteered for military service at the outbreak of the Pacific War in 1941, FEU men formed the greatest number.

=== During the war ===
In 1942, the university closed and the campus was used as a multi-functional facility by the Imperial Japanese Army Transportation Corps. It was later used as the Prisoner of War Bureau for the Japanese Army.

The main building sustained bullet damage while the other three buildings (Girls High, Boys High, and the old Technology Building) were left intact. During the Battle of Manila in 1945, Dr. Nicanor B. Reyes, Sr. was killed by the Japanese, and Atty./Engr. Hermengildo B. Reyes was appointed the second president of the university after it reopened in June of the same year.

=== Post-war ===
In October 1945, FEU reopened despite the use of most of its facilities by the American forces until their departure in May 1946. The post-liberation years saw the renaissance of FEU with its massive expansion of facilities aimed at meeting the demands of modern and relevant education in the country and the increasing student population. FEU was once named as the “Largest University in Asia” in the early 1950s when its enrollment passed near 50,000 students.

Thereafter, FEU continued to expand, with the opening of the Science Building and the establishment of the Institute of Medicine and the School of Nursing. In 1955, the FEU Hospital was inaugurated. Humanities were introduced in 1959, and in 1970, the Institute of Architecture and Fine Arts opened. Also in 1970, the for-profit status of the Institute of Medicine, School of Medical Technology, FEU Hospital and the Student Health Service Clinic was altered, when these were converted into the Far Eastern University – Nicanor Reyes Medical Foundation, a non-stock, non-profit educational foundation.

In 1989, Nicanor M. Reyes, Jr. introduced substantial revitalization to FEU that took place over a number of years, with renovation and modernization of facilities and grounds and upgrading of the university's educational standard. This resulted in the accreditation of the Institute of Arts and Sciences, the Institute of Education, and the Institute of Accounts, Business and Finance, and, in the mid-1990s, the deregulation of the university by the Commission on Higher Education. The auditorium was upgraded to accommodate modern stage productions and the new twice-monthly presentations by local and international artists established by the President's Committee on Culture. The university also prioritized publication, launching a number of scholarly journals, and began networking with other institutions nationally and abroad.

In 1996, after careful study of the technology program, the administration decided to phase out the Institute of Technology and its engineering programs in favor of a computer technology program forged with the East Asia College, established earlier in 1992, which offered degrees in computer science and certificate courses. FEU would then buy out its stocks in 2003 and establish the FEU East Asia College (FEU-EAC).

In 2010, FEU established the Institute of Tourism and Hotel Management and the FEU Makati Campus, which started its operations by June of the same year. FEU Makati initially offered baccalaureate programs in Accountancy, Accounting Technology, Information Technology and Business Administration. FEU also continued to open several campuses in Silang, Cavite and Filinvest City in Alabang, and acquired Roosevelt College, Inc. in Rizal.

In 2022, the new Institute of Health Sciences and Nursing (IHSN) was established, which would offer health allied programs in the university, with the existing Nursing program merged with Medical Technology.

In 2024, FEU reintroduced its Chemistry and Economics programs and launched three new programs: Human Resource and Organizational Development, Pharmacy, and Nutrition and Dietetics, to expand its academic offerings.

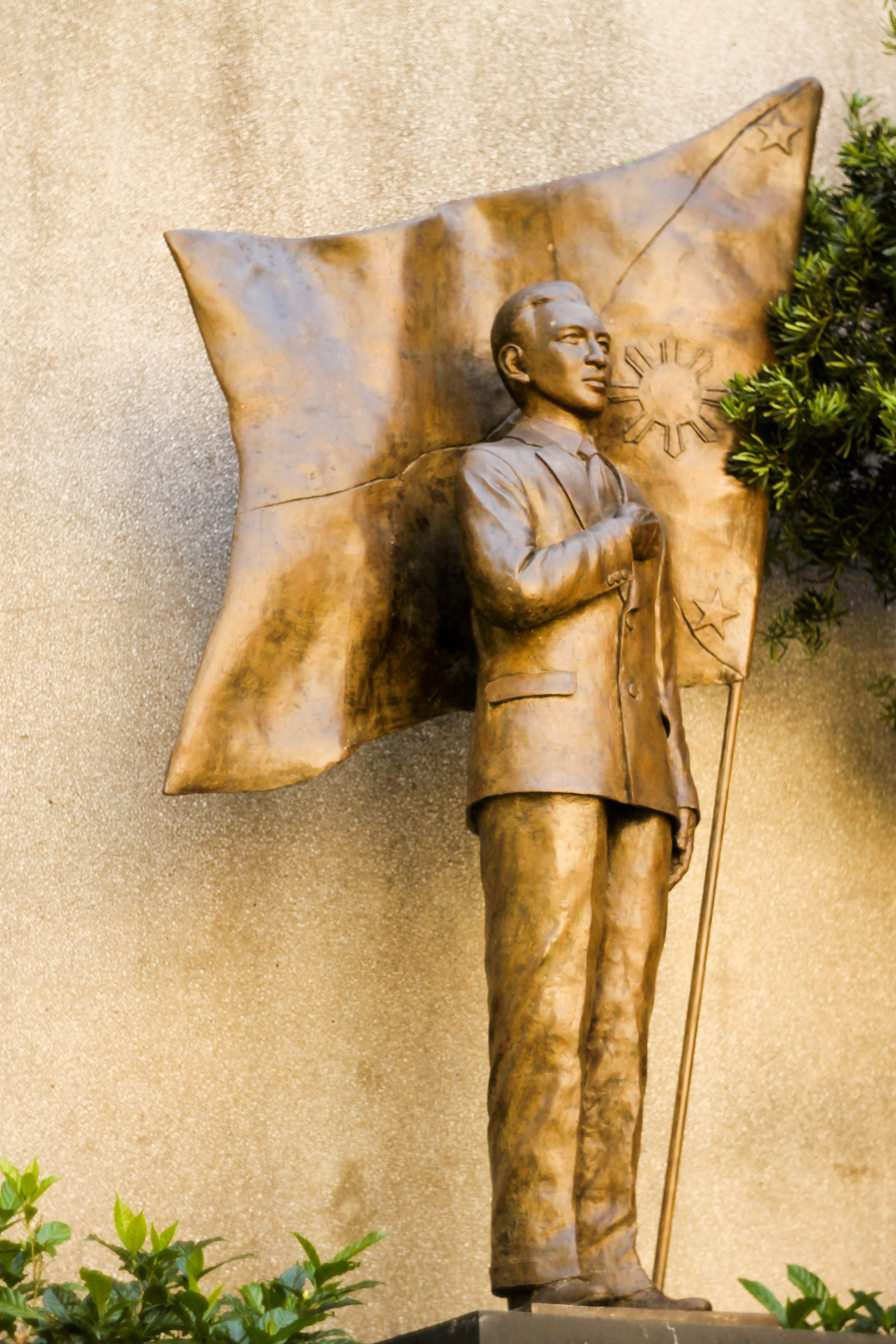
Nicanor B. Reyes Sr. sculpted by Peter De Guzman

=== Corporate ===
The Far Eastern University, Incorporated (PSE: FEU) is a domestic non-sectarian educational institution founded in June 1928 and was registered and incorporated with the Philippine Securities and Exchange Commission on October 27, 1933. On October 27, 1983, the university extended its corporate life to another 50 years. The university became a listed corporation in the PSE on July 11, 1986.

The company operates through three segments: education, real estate and investment activities. Its geographical segments include Manila, Makati and Cavite.

The university's major subsidiaries include: Far Eastern College – Silang, Inc. (FECSI), East Asia Computer Center, Inc. (EACCI), Fern Realty Corporation (FRC), FEU Alabang, Inc. and FEU High School, Inc. Similar to the university, FECSI, EACCI, FEU Alabang, Inc. and FEU High School, Inc. were established to operate as educational institutions offering general courses of study. In April 2016, FEU entered into a share purchase agreement to acquire an initial 80% of Roosevelt College, Inc.

In 2019, FEU has entered into a joint venture with the Technological Institute of the Philippines to launch Edustria, a senior high school in Batangas.

In 2022, FEU successfully concluded two additional collaborative initiatives. One involved the establishment of a nursing institution in Brunei in conjunction with Jerudong Park Medical Center Sendirian Berhad. The second endeavor entailed a partnership with Good Samaritan Colleges located in Cabanatuan City, Nueva Ecija, as part of their strategic plan.

In 2023, FEU partnered with Unilab Education to form Higher Academia, Inc., and launched a new campus in Pampanga.

In 2026, FEU completed an investment to acquire a majority stake in the Bataan Peninsula Educational Institution, Inc., the operator of the University of Nueva Caceres - Bataan in Dinalupihan.

== University emblems ==
A stamp in commemoration of FEU's 50th Anniversary

The university seal

The FEU Coat of Arms depicts a Sarimanok holding a kalasag. Inside the kalasag is an 8 pointed star with a bamboo scroll under it, inscribed with the baybayin letters “KKK”. Meanwhile, the university seal has the Coat of Arms housed inside a green ellipse with gold outline, surrounded with the university's name in baybayin-inspired font and the IABF's founding year at the bottom.

- The logo and font were designed by Galo Ocampo, the Father of Philippine Heraldry.
- FEU is one of the first universities in the country to be established by a Filipino. Thus, in 1961, the university wanted to showcase the Sarimanok-inspired coat of arms, as proposed by former Institute of Arts and Sciences Dean Alejandro Roces; for it projects the nationalistic spirit upon which the university was founded. It also serves as the link between the past and present.
- The "KKK" inscription means Katotohanan (Truth), Kagandahan (Beauty), and Kabutihan (Goodness).

The university colors

Green and Gold are the university's official colors. Green is for hope, representing Rizal's "Fair hope of the Fatherland" while Gold represents the golden opportunity for the university to serve the youth and her alumni to serve the country.

The university mascot

The tamaraw is the athletic mascot of the university and nickname of every FEU student. Known scientifically as “Bubalus mindorensis”, it is an endemic animal found only in the island of Mindoro.

The university mace

The mace is the symbol of the university which is used on every formal academic event such as commencement exercises and recognition rites. The mace serves as the emblem of the President's Office and is prominently showcased during official University events presided over by the President. It comprises the university seal meticulously crafted from solid bronze, situated atop a finely carved staff made from Philippine hardwood.

== Manila Campus ==
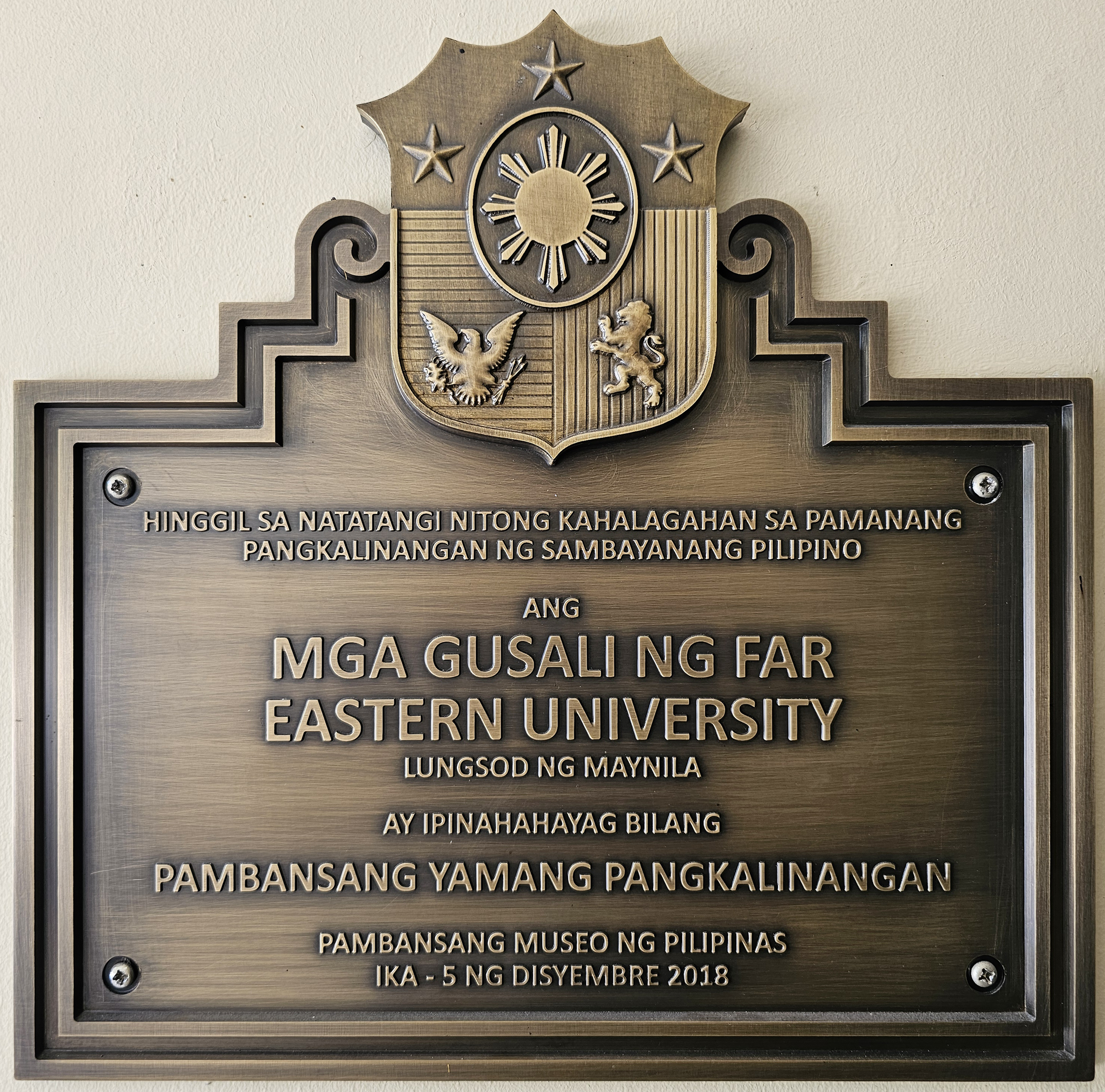
National Cultural Treasure marker in the campus

Among the buildings on FEU's campus complex, five by the late Ar. Pablo S. Antonio Sr., garnered recognition in 2005 from the United Nations Educational, Scientific and Cultural Organization (UNESCO), who bestowed the Asia Pacific Heritage Award for Cultural Heritage on the university for "the outstanding preservation of its Art Deco structures." The buildings include the Nicanor B. Reyes Sr. Hall, the Admissions Building, the Architecture and Fine Arts Building, the Administration Building, and the Science Building. The Cultural Center of the Philippines also recognized the historical legacy of the buildings with a marker. Other historical buildings on the campus include the 1950s FEU Chapel and the Arts Building, which are designed in the International Style by Felipe Mendoza.

In 2018, these Art Deco buildings, the FEU Chapel, and several art works were declared as National Cultural Treasures (NCT) by the National Museum of the Philippines. The Felipe Mendoza-designed chapel, featuring the striking Fatima mosaic on its facade by Vicente Manansala, the "Crucifixion of Christ" and "Via Crucis" paintings by Botong Francisco, and the stained-glass panels and mural crafted by Antonio Dumlao were recognized as part of this prestigious collection. Furthermore, the brass sculptures by Manansala at the quadrangle and the bas-reliefs by Francesco Riccardo Monti in the Administration Building lobby were also honored as NCTs.

The university maintains various facilities, such as an electronic library, various types of laboratories, an auditorium, audio-visual and multimedia rooms, technology-based gate security and enrollment system, and gymnasiums. Due to FEU's mission to preserve and care for the environment, the university has a green and eco-friendly campus landscape and is famously called as the "Oasis of the University Belt".

Presidents
Name	Tenure of office
Nicanor B. Reyes Sr.	1934–1945
Hermenegildo T. Reyes	1945–1946
Clemente Q. Uson	1946–1949
Vidal A. Tan	1949–1952
Teodoro T. Evangelista Sr.	1952–1971
Nicanor M. Reyes Jr.	1971–1985
Josephine C. Reyes	1985–1989
Felixberto C. Sta. Maria	1989–1995
Edilberto de Jesus	1995–2002
Lydia B. Echauz	2002–2012
Michael M. Alba	2012–2023
Juan Miguel R. Montinola	2023–present
References

=== History ===
During the 1930s, there was a heavy influence of American culture especially in the field of technology and construction that was reflected in the lives of the Filipinos. Concrete and steel were used by the Americans and was found to be the suitable materials for the tropical environment. These were materialized by Arch. Pablo S. Antonio Sr. in creating the FEU campus buildings that reflected both the university's and the country's vision and showed his personal transition from Art Deco to the International Style. The buildings were constructed between the years 1939 to 1950.

=== Heritage Buildings of FEU Manila Campus ===
==== Nicanor Reyes Sr. Hall ====
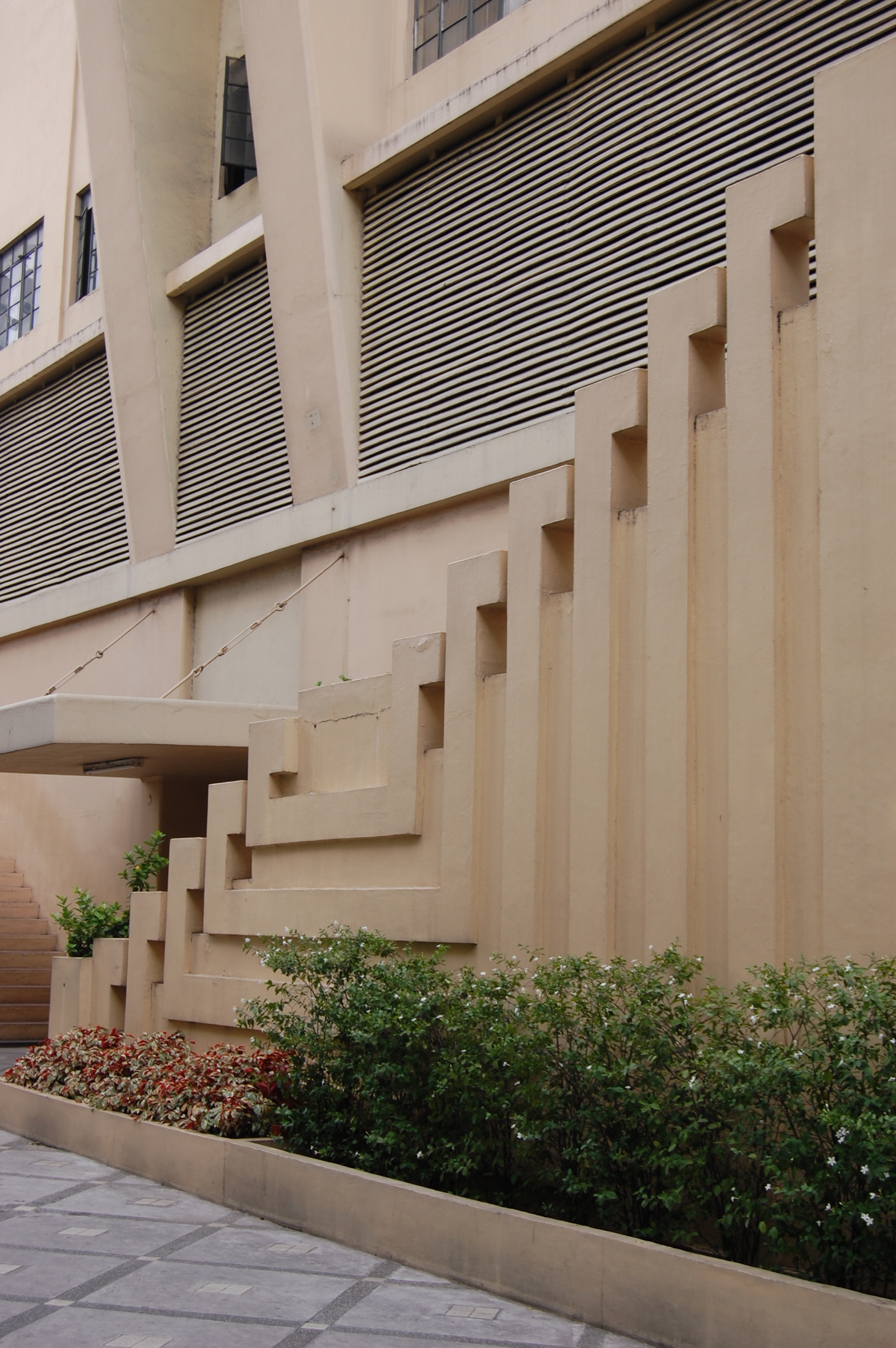
Art deco-style side stairs of the administration building

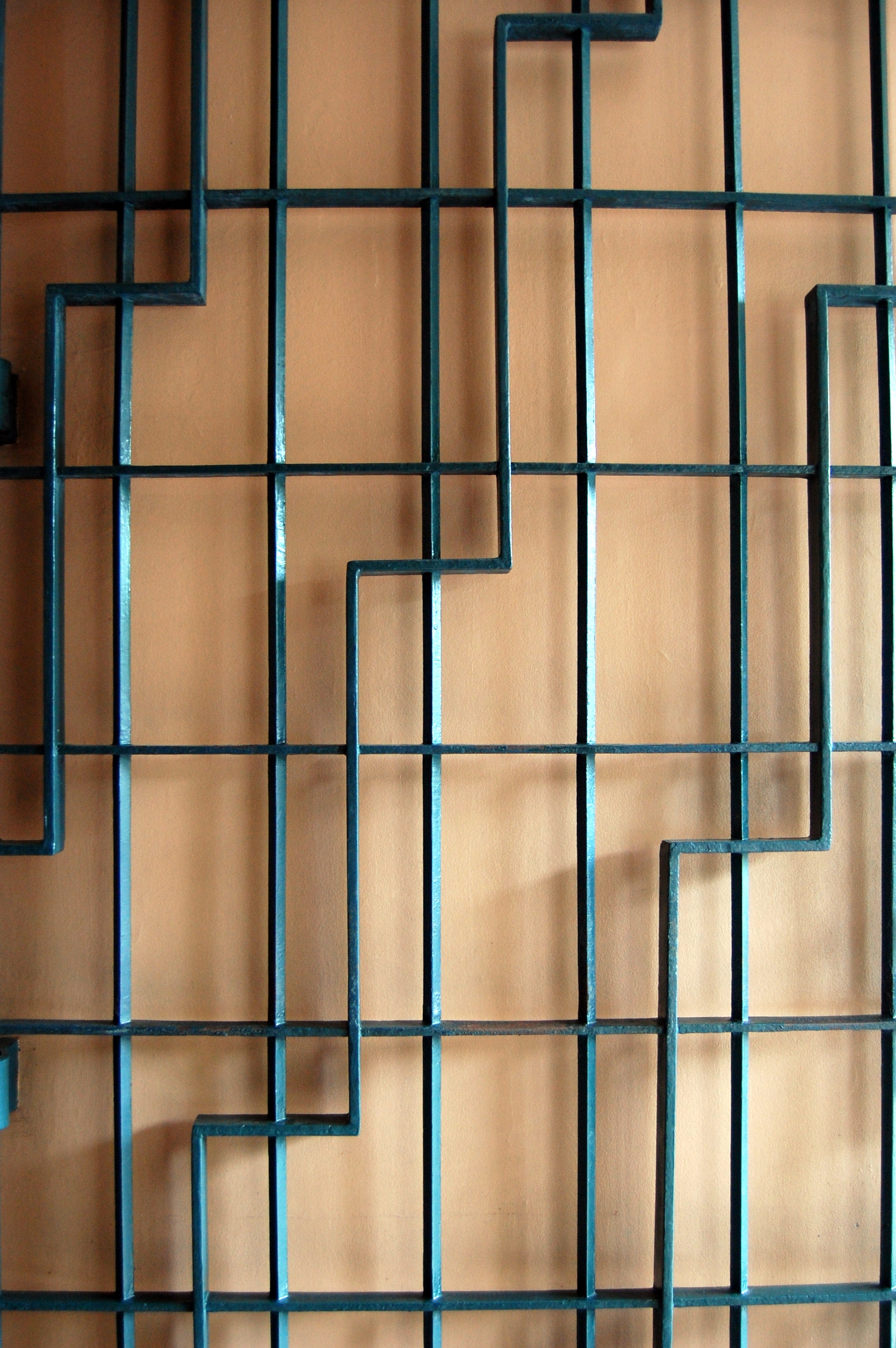
Art Deco-style gate grill details of the admin building

The Nicanor Reyes Sr. Hall, named after the founder, is a long, low-rise U-shaped building facing Quezon Boulevard beside the Alfredo Reyes Hall. The building was constructed in 1940 by National Artist Arch. Pablo Antonio Sr. The distinct character of the massive façade are the sets of protruded vertical volumes located on both ends of the structure.

Attention to details is another design focus of the architecture of Pablo S. Antonio Sr. The heavy influence of Art Deco in his architectural style is seen even in transitional elements like the stairs. The outdoor stairs that joins the walkway at the second floor has layers of thin concrete slabs that swirl in waves above the rigid geometry of the handrail. The physical envelope of the building is one of the examples of classic Philippine Art Deco emphasizing the play on geometric forms.

The NRH houses the university library and academic offices.

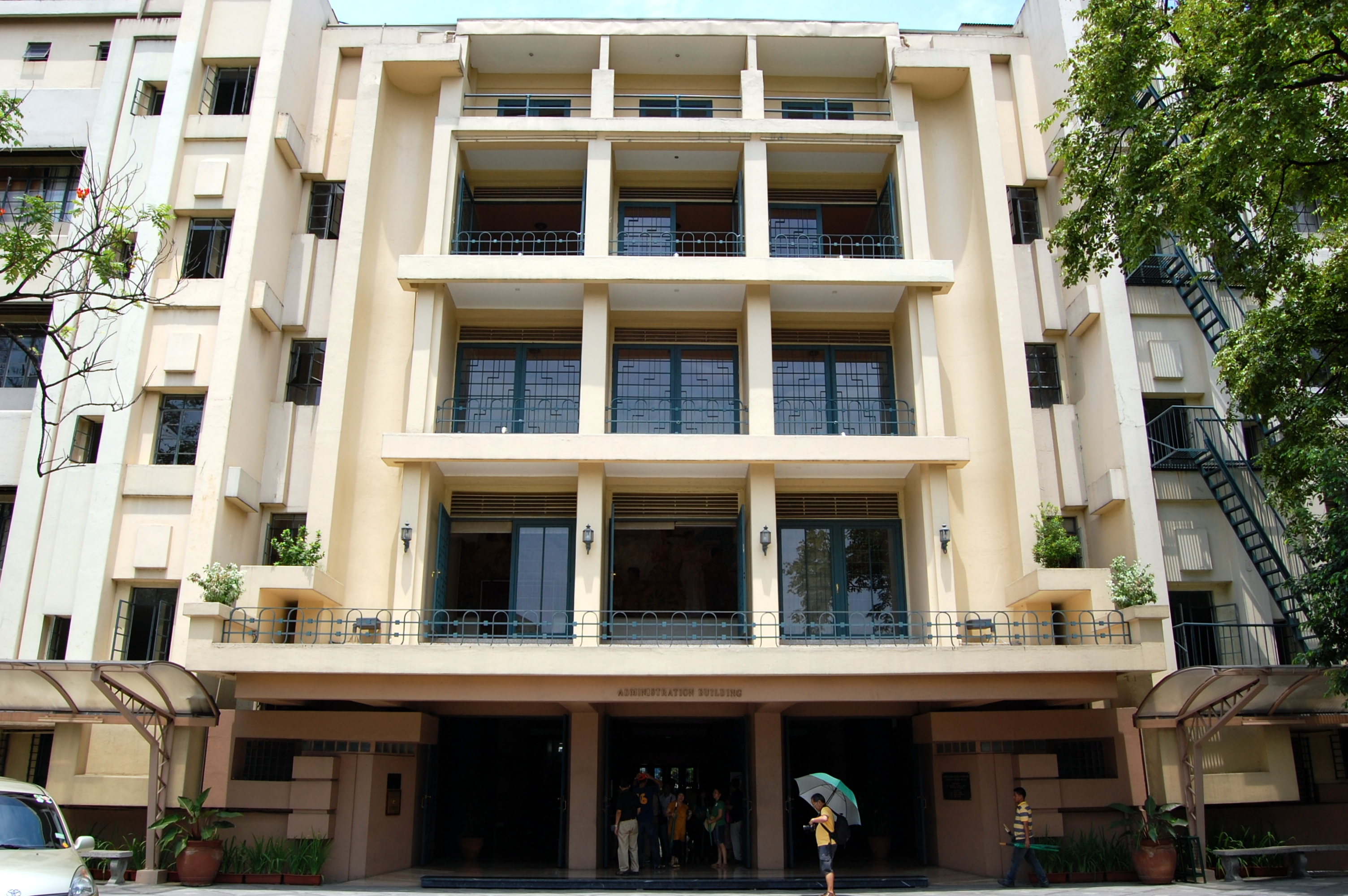
Facade of FEU Administration Building

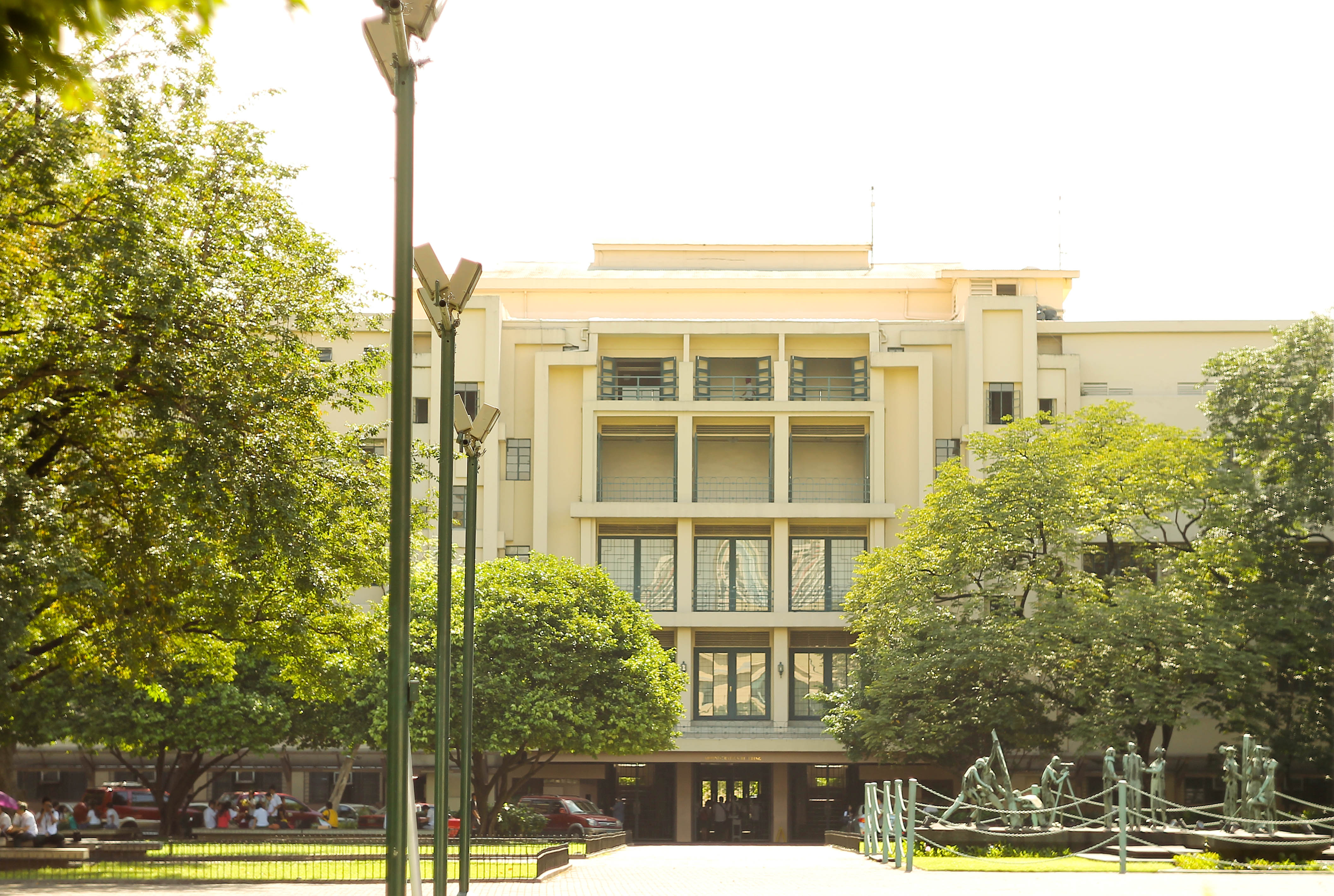
The FEU Administration Building viewed from the Nicanor Reyes Memorial Square

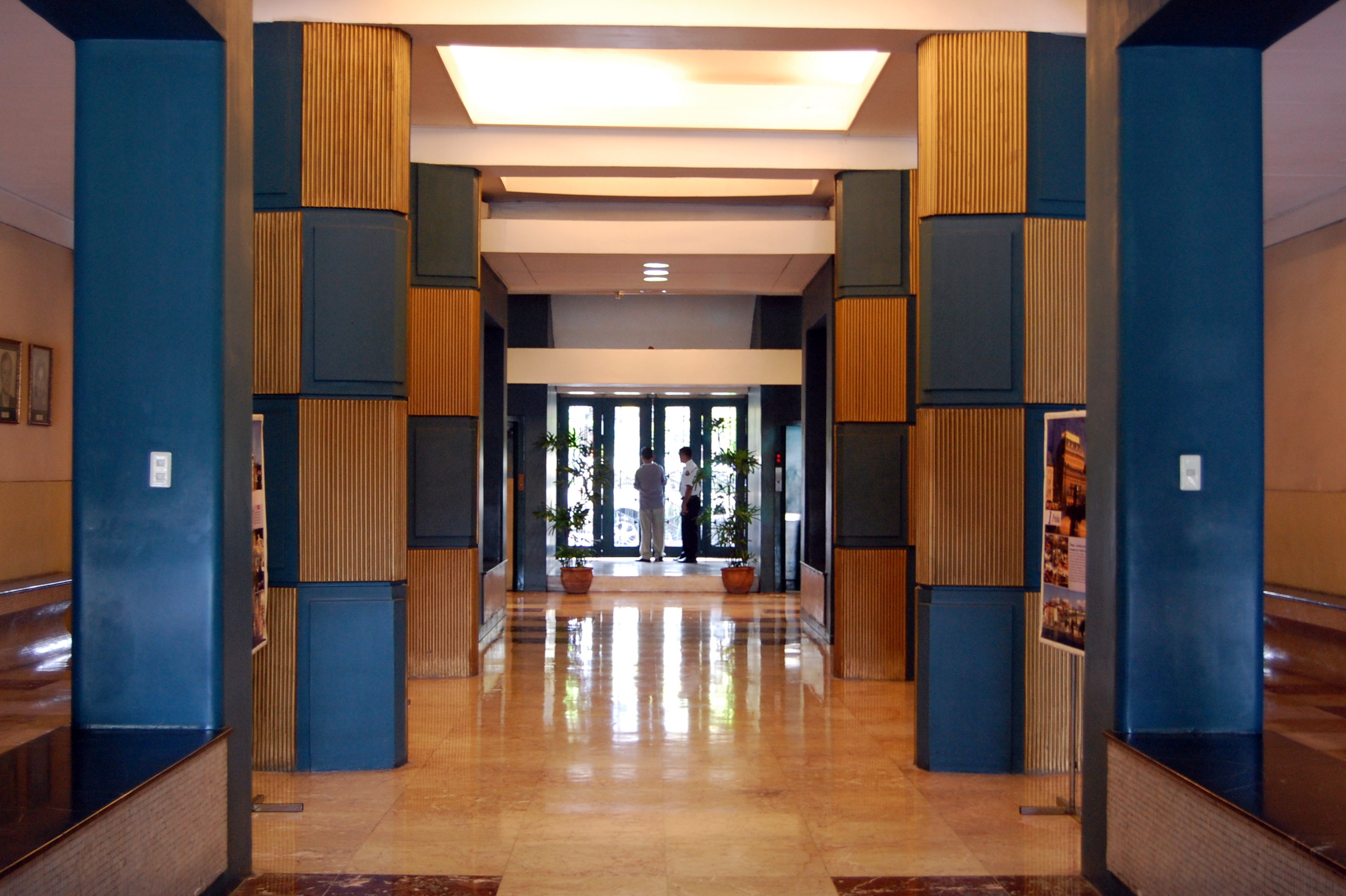
Lobby of FEU Administration building

==== Administration Building ====
The Administration Building was also designed by Arch. Antonio Sr. a decade after the Nicanor Reyes Hall. It is located at the opposite end of the campus quadrangle that features a façade with geometric architectural details, horizontal windows, and a balcony that extends into a viewing deck at the second floor to observe the activities in the quadrangle.

It houses the works of many known Filipino artists, most of them in the Art Deco era. One work is a mural done by Antonio Gonzales Dumlao, which conveys the university's mission; while Italian sculptor Francesco Riccardo Monti did a bas-relief on the lobby depicting the history of the Philippines. The Art Deco FEU Auditorium can be found inside the building, considered as its centerpiece.

Art Deco features abound in the design of the Auditorium and include the gradual curves, the ribbed piers and geometric volumes and patterns. Above the orchestra section are star or diamond like patterns which also serve as lighting fixtures. Above the balcony are triangles which also serve as air conditioning ducts. These, together with the green and gold theme, and the subtle lettering of "FEU" under the boxes were all combined in a regal manner. The interior was restored in 2002-2003 and was also infused with new lighting, sound and video equipment. It was the only post-war venue with air-conditioning and a revolving stage. It used to be the cultural center of the Philippines in the 1950s given that all the foremost Filipino and foreign performers of the time performed there.

==== Admissions Building ====
Inaugurated in 1940, the Admissions Building is the mirror image of the Architecture & Fine Arts Building. The building was initially used by the Girls' High School, and in 1983, became home to the Institute of Medicine. In the early 2000s, it served as the FEU-East Asia College (FEU-EAC) Main Building. In 2015, the building has been renovated and returned to FEU Manila, renamed as the Admissions Building. Today, the building houses the Office of the University Registrar, Admissions and Financial Assistance Office, Alumni Relations Office, various computer laboratories, and education technology offices.

==== Architecture and Fine Arts Building ====
The building is one of the twin edifices flanking the Administration Building. It is the third building designed by Arch. Antonio Sr., also in the Art Deco Style. Constructed in 1941, it used to house the Boys' High School, which was originally in the basic education program of the university. It also used to house the Law and Nursing programs before being handed to the Institute of Architecture and Fine Arts.

==== Science Building ====
The seven-story building erected in 1950 was the last to be designed by Arch. Antonio Sr. in what is considered a transition of style between Art Deco and the post World War 2 International Style. In 1990, an earthquake caused structural damages to the building making it necessary to demolish the top two floors. By late 2013, a sixth floor was added. Composed of various science laboratories, the building caters to Biology, Nursing, Medical Technology, and Pharmacy programs.

==== Accounts, Business and Finance Building ====
Initially made as the expansion of Nursing Building in the early 1970s, the 7-storey building is formerly known as the Education Building, before the building was renamed as the Accounts, Business and Finance Building in 2017, as the building is currently occupied by the Institute of Accounts, Business and Finance.

==== Alfredo Reyes Hall ====
Named after one of the founder's son, the Alfredo Reyes Hall is a 6-storey building, adjacent to the Nicanor Reyes Hall. Housing the Institute of Tourism and Hotel Management, it features a mock hotel, cooking laboratories, a basketball court with maple wood flooring, which was the first of its kind in the country, and a student operated café, Cafe Alfredo, which was established in 2014.

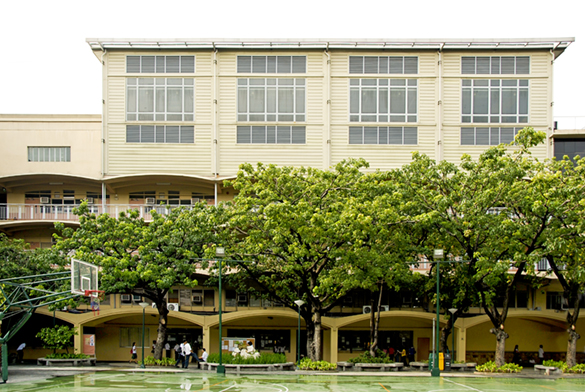
The FEU Arts Building

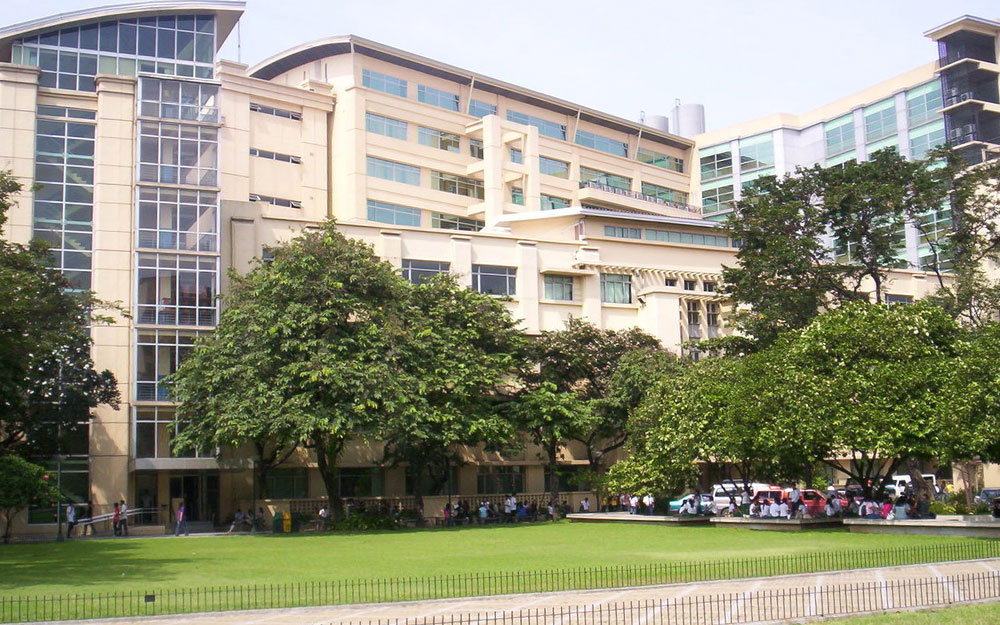
The Education Building, along with the Admissions Building, and the Engineering Building

==== Arts Building ====
Designed by Felipe Mendoza, the Arts Building was erected in 1960 and was originally an 7-storey building, before being downgraded to 4-storeys due to structural damage in the aftermath of the August 1968 Luzon earthquake. The Arts Building houses the Institute of Arts and Sciences' Departments of Communication, Political Science, Interdisciplinary & International Studies, Language and Literature, and Psychology. The building features a gym on the topmost floor and the University Conference Center on the ground floor.

==== Education Building ====
Formerly known as the FEU-EAC Annex, the seven-story building was completed in 2001, as part of FEU-EAC's expansion. The building was also based on the Nicanor Reyes Hall, as the building features two pillars inspired from the former's pillars, and an arched rooftop, surrounded by green-colored glass. The building currently houses the Institute of Education.

==== Engineering Building ====
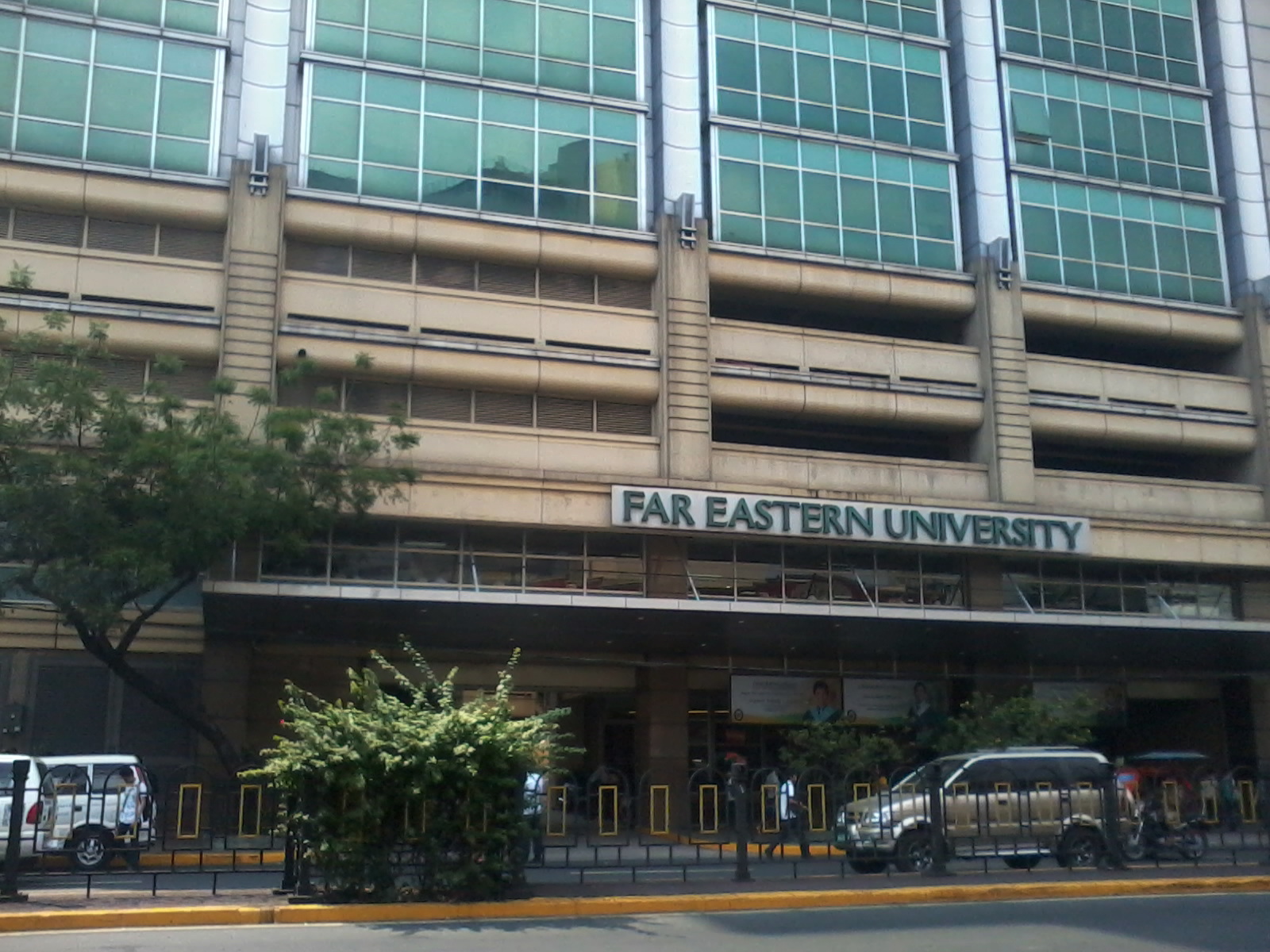
Facade of FEU Engineering Building

The nine-story building stands on the site of the former FEU Hospital. Upon the transfer of FEU-NRMF to Fairview, Quezon City, the structure was demolished to give way for the construction of a new building, completed in 2005. The building was designed by Arch. Pablo Antonio, Jr. as the Technology Building before being renamed as the Engineering Building in 2019. It houses the FEU Tech Innovation Center, a mini auditorium, and the FEU Center for the Arts.

==== FEUTURE Center ====
The FEU Transformative University Resource Center (abbreviated as FEUTURE Center) is the newest building of the university. Located along Lerma St., the FEUTURE Center is an 8-storey building which features additional classrooms, learning facilities and parking spaces within the complex. Construction for the building began in 2018, and was initially planned to be opened within the first quarter of 2020. However, the opening of the building was delayed due to COVID-19 pandemic, and was initially completed in January 2021, before opening its doors in April 2021.

==== Nursing Building ====
The seven-story building was completed in the 1960s, and served as the former home of the Institute of Architecture and Fine Arts. It was turned over to the Institute of Nursing, being the reason for its current name. At present, it still houses the Institute's Virtual Integrated Nursing Education Simulation Laboratory (VINES) and is dominantly occupied by FEU High School.

==== FEU Auditorium ====
The FEU Auditorium is designed by Pablo Antonio Sr., National Artist for Architecture, in 1949. It was regarded as the first "cultural center of the Philippines", and also, the very first fully air-conditioned auditorium in the country which can accommodate 1100 spectators. The Auditorium was home to the Manila Symphony Orchestra for 9 years. It featured dances from Manila Ballet Academy, New York City Center Ballet, and Martha Graham – an American dancer and one of the twentieth century revolutionary artists. It also became the venue of major theatrical productions like Bastien and Bastienne – created by two National Artists, Nick Joaquin (on words) and Cesar Legaspi (on scenic designs). In addition, it was in FEU where Sarah Joaquin–actress, writer, director, and former Head of the Drama Department–showcased her talents through presentation of classic and contemporary plays. To this date, the Auditorium upholds this legacy by accommodating more notable performances from local and international names.

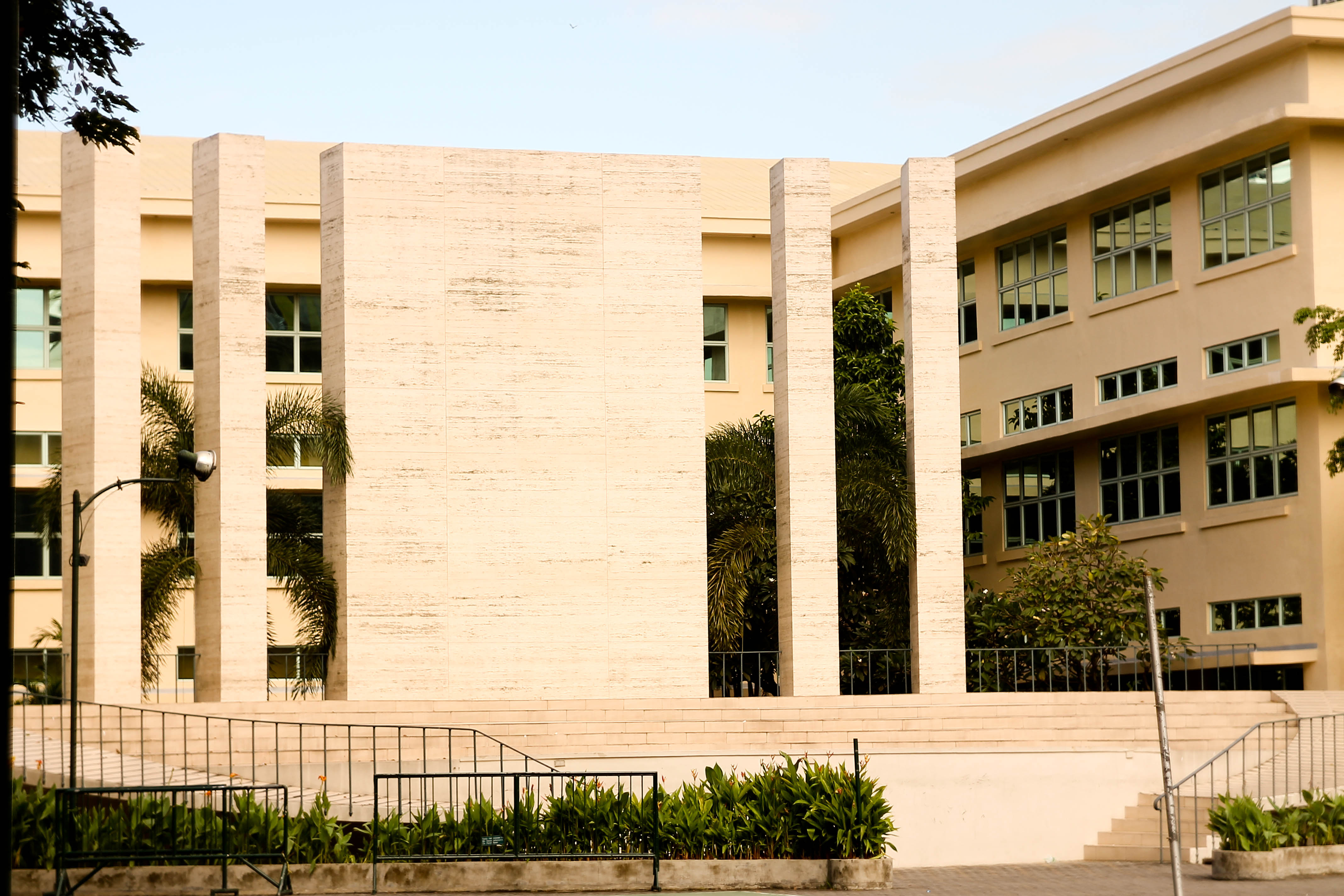
The FEU Grandstand

==== FEU Chapel ====
Within campus is the Student Council Association (SCA) Chapel, which was also designed by Arch. Mendoza. Inaugurated on December 8, 1957, the SCA Chapel is where catholic activities of faculty, personnel, and students are held. Its interior features paintings by Carlos “Botong” Francisco, National Artist for Visual Arts. His painting the 14 Stations of the Cross and the Crucifixion encompasses 260 degrees of one's visual range meanwhile its façade bears a richly colored tile mosaic of Our Lady of Fatima by Vicente Manansala.

==== Dr. Nicanor Reyes Sr. Memorial Square ====
In the middle of the campus rests this eye-catching landmark. Erected in commemoration of the university's 40th anniversary, it consists of a 65-foot flagpole on a platform surrounded on all sides with brass sculpture, also done by Manansala, which interprets the late founder's philosophy on education.

==== FEU Library ====
Located on the second and third floors of the Nicanor Reyes Hall, the Library has a collection of books that falls under Circulation, Reference, Filipiniana, and Periodical sections. These can easily be accessed using an Online Public Access Catalog (OPAC), its online database of all its print and multi-media resources. The Electronic Library is also available to provide members of the academic community highly effective learning experiences and services through the web and internet technologies as an extension of the services of the conventional library.

The Philippine Association of Academic Research Librarians, Inc. (PAARL) honored the library with the Outstanding Academic/Research Library Award during the PAARL 2012 Awards. The FEU library was recognized for its outstanding contribution to academic and research librarianship and library development along with leadership in regional library management, education and training, information and documentation services.

== Academics ==
Far Eastern University offers 28 undergraduate programs, 21 graduate degree programs, and a law school through its seven institutes, while FEU Tech offers 12 undergraduate programs leading to engineering and computer studies. The university offers secondary, post-secondary, and certification courses as well. Since 2020, FEU Manila holds extension programs in its Cavite campus.

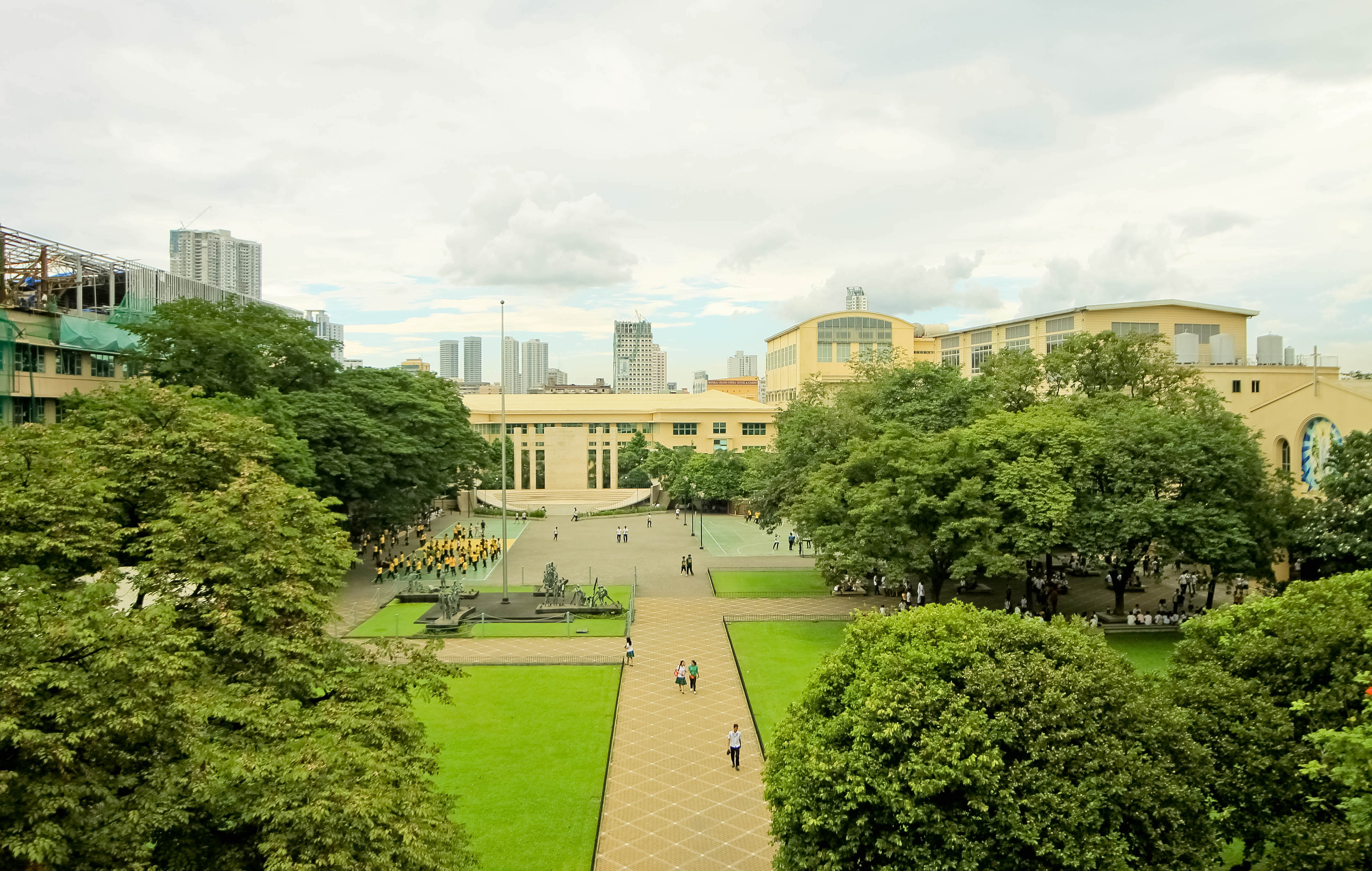
Green spaces inside the campus

The university runs on a semestral academic system. An academic year starts in the second week of August and ends in May. The university is supervised by the Board of Trustees, which is made up of academic practitioners and specialists from various disciplines.

Institute founding
Institutes	Year founded
Accounts, Business and Finance	1929
Arts and Sciences	1934
Education	1934
Law	1934
Technology	1936
Medicine	1952
Nursing	1955
Graduate Studies	1957
Architecture and Fine Arts	1970
Tourism and Hotel Management	2010
Health Sciences and Nursing	2022

The FEU General Education (GE) program comprises fifteen 3-unit courses, typically spanning the first two years of undergraduate study. This curriculum prioritizes the alignment of expected learning outcomes, from the overarching university level to course-specific outcomes, guiding instructional design. GE courses emphasize the development of functional knowledge and foundational skills, placing both humanities and sciences content as a means for students to showcase critical thinking and contextualization abilities. The curriculum promotes student-centered learning approaches, where students actively participate in their knowledge construction.

=== Admissions and Scholarship grants ===
Students who wish to study in the university must pass the College Admissions Test (FEUCAT).

In 2021, due to the COVID-19 global pandemic, the FEUCAT was replaced by the FEU Student Placement for Admission to College Education (SPACE), wherein academic performance in Grades 11 and 12 are the basis for admissions. Application through the FEUCAT resumed in 2022.

The university has an open admission policy, welcoming a broad spectrum of students without rigorous entrance exams, promoting inclusivity in higher education. Specific programs may have additional admission criteria.

FEU funds an average of over 3,500 scholars every year, providing about 11% of the total student population. Scholarships are granted to academically qualified students, financially challenged yet deserving individuals, and university representatives in different fields of service and interests.

=== Grading system ===
An FEU student's final grade for a course generally comes in the form of a letter, which is a summary of their performance in the formative and summative assessments. A is given a value of 4, B+ 3.5, B 3, C+ 2.5, C 2, D+ 1.5, D 1, and F 0. The passing mark for all university courses regardless of program is 50%.

Grade Scale
Range	Quality Point	Letter Grade
0.99 and lower	0.0	F
1.00 - 1.29	1.0	D
1.30 - 1.79	1.5	D+
1.80 - 2.29	2.0	C
2.30 - 2.79	2.5	C+
2.80 - 3.29	3.0	B
3.30 - 3.79	3.5	B+
3.80 - 4.00	4.0	A

=== Research ===
FEU funds research in areas such as biodiversity, urban renewal, public health, genetics, sociolinguistics, and indigenous cultures. The university, through the representation of the URC, has been an active member of the Metro Manila Health Research and Development Consortium (MMHRDC) and the University belt Consortium (U-Belt Consortium). FEU has established partnerships and collaborations with universities and institutions around the world. These collaborations often involve student and faculty exchange programs, joint research projects, and academic cooperation in various fields of study.

- FEU Public Policy Center - is a private research foundation which aims to make a substantive contribution to evidence-based policymaking through in-depth research and public discussion.
- FEU Academy - it serves as the university's arm for conducting relevant trainings and programs for non-FEU students and professionals.
- FEU Innovation Center - will serve as a think-tank and incubation center for business ideas.
- FEU Community Extension Services (CES)
- Center for Teaching and Learning (CTL)
- Center for Learning Enrichment & Research for Students
- Language Learning Center
- University Research Center (URC) - a university-based research and extension unit that aims to foster a culture of research in the university. The URC facilitates the production of research through funding, research capability-building, research information dissemination, linkages and publication.
  - FEU Herbarium
  - FEU-DENR-WWF Tams2
  - Cocoon Philippines

FEU Publications is the publishing arm of the university under the Corporate Affairs Office. The office publishes trade books, non-book materials, and Tambuli, the university's official biannual magazine that highlights the university's achievements, community initiatives, and academic contributions.

In addition to its publishing activities, FEU supports scholarly communication through a number of peer-reviewed academic and research journals that provide platforms for faculty members, researchers, and graduate students to publish original research and contribute to knowledge development across various disciplines. These journals include: Asian Journal on Perspectives in Education (AJPE), FRAMEwork and Sikhay.

University rankings

Regional – Overall
- QS Asia: 681-700 (2025)

National – Overall
- QS National: 10 (2025)

=== Recognition and accreditation ===
Conferred the Autonomous University status by the Commission on Higher Education (CHED), FEU Manila currently meets the highest regulatory standards set for Philippine higher education institutions. CHED has also designated FEU's Teacher Education Program and Bachelor of Science in Business Administration as Center of Excellence and Center of Development, respectively.

The university has twenty-one accredited program, wherein eight of the undergraduate programs have Level IV accreditation from the Philippine Association of Colleges and Universities Commission on Accreditation (PACUCOA), while the rest are on their way to obtaining higher accreditation levels.

FEU Manila's international recognitions include being an associate member of the ASEAN University Network – Quality Assurance (AUN-QA); a member of the Association to Advance Collegiate Schools of Business (AACSB) for its Accountancy, Business Administration, and Master of Business Administration programs; and an associate member of the International Centre of Excellence in Tourism and Hospitality Management (THE-ICE) for its Tourism Management and Hotel and Restaurant Management programs. FEU Manila holds accreditation for 18 programs granted by the AUN-QA. FEU-ITHM's Tourism Management program is also accredited by the Asia-Pacific Institute for Events Management (APIEM) as a Center of Excellence.

FEU was the only Philippine school included in the World Universities with Real Impact (WURI) Ranking for 2020, placing 91st in the Global Top 100 Innovative Universities. It also placed 19th on Ethical Value, according to the WURI ranking system. For the fourth consecutive year, FEU has been recognized in the Quacquarelli Symonds (QS) Rankings, placing highest at 681–700 in Asia.

International

The university received an ISO 9000:2008 for Quality Management and became one of the pilot universities in assessment by IQUAME. FEU is actively fostering global connections through partnerships with 30 international institutions.

== Student life ==
FEU has had long and rich history in education, culture, arts, sports and student leadership development.

=== Athletics ===
FEU is a founding member of the two major collegiate athletic organizations in the Philippines, namely the National Collegiate Athletic Association (NCAA) and the University Athletic Association of the Philippines (UAAP).

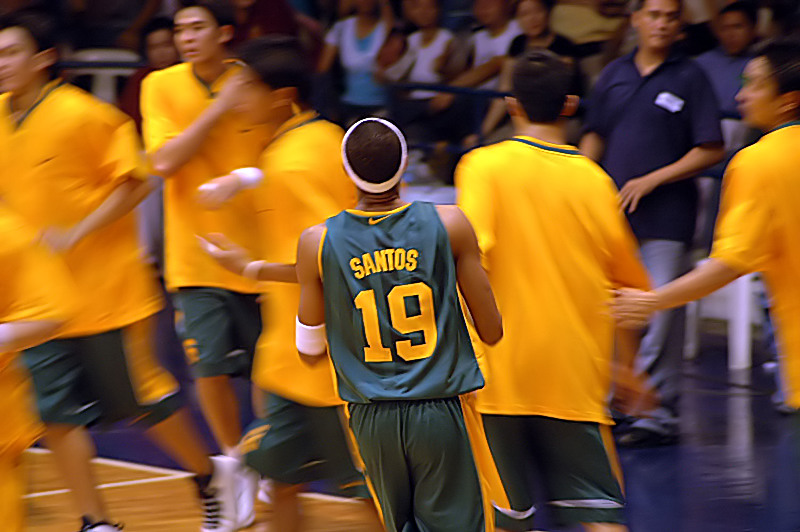
Arwind Santos during his tenure with the FEU Tamaraws

Among the many athletes who have attended FEU are Alberto Nogar Sr, Lydia De Vega, Elma Muros, Anthony Villanueva, and Johnny Abarrientos. FEU's teams are named after the tamaraw, a buffalo with a reputation for ferocity.

=== Events ===
The university hosts various events throughout the school year to celebrate milestones, support student endeavors, and recognize its community's achievements. To encourage student participation, classes are suspended for certain time schedules known as 'Activity Periods'.

- Tatak Tamaraw - a week long welcoming of freshmen to the FEU community. It involves the orientation on academic policies, university support services, and the vibrant campus life of FEU. The event is capped-off with a welcome fest concert at the end of the week.
- Tam Hunt - the student organizations membership fair facilitated by the FEU Central Student Organization which boosts student engagement through various initiatives and causes.
- Tam Rally - parade of student athletes in preparation for the upcoming UAAP season.
- CreePIYU - an annual halloween event managed by the FEU Guides.
- Pasko sa Piyu - annual Christmas tree-lighting ceremony of the university in anticipation of the holiday season.
- Foundation Week - the university commemorates its founder's legacy through a week long celebration, with a roster of events such as academic lectures and workshops, cultural performances, and student-led functions.
  - One Concierto Piyu - the anticipated highlight concert of the Foundation Week with a line-up of contemporary Filipino artists and bands.

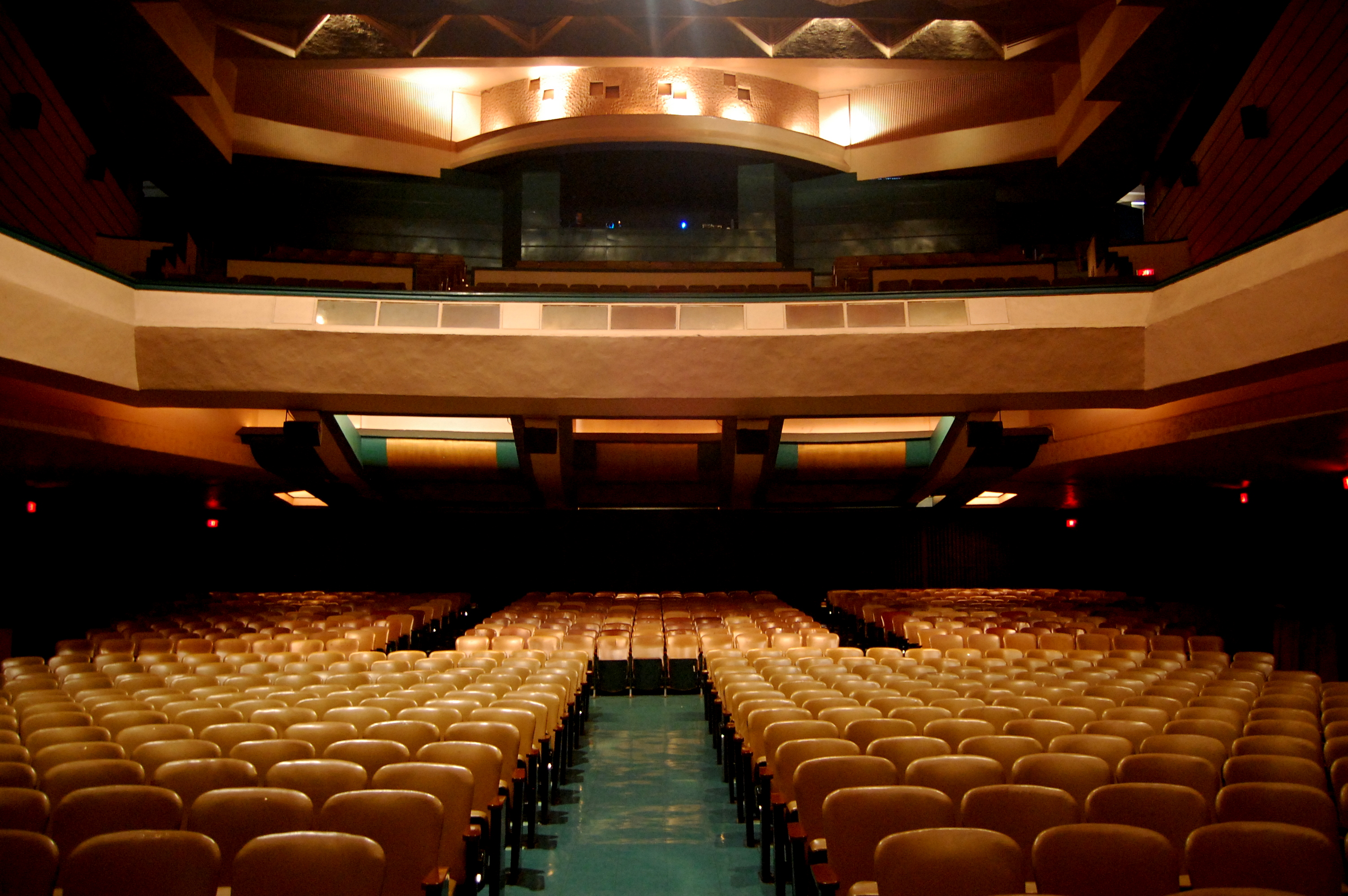
FEU Auditorium

=== Arts and culture ===
Since 1990, the university has maintained the FEU Center for the Arts (FCA), formerly known as President's Committee on Culture, which programs a year-long calendar of cultural activities. The FCA nurtures seven cultural groups namely, FEU Bamboo Band, FEU Chorale, FEU Dance Company, FEU Drum and Bugle Corps, FEU Theater Guild, FEU Drummers and the FEU Guides. The FEU Guides conduct tours of FEU's UNESCO recognized campus.

FEU houses a vast art collection, featuring pieces by well-known Filipino artists like National Artists Botong Francisco and Vicente Manansala, in addition to works by international artists. This collection comprises paintings, sculptures, and diverse art forms showcased throughout the university's campuses and buildings. National Artist for Literature Nick Joaquin’s memorabilia is also an exhibit at the FEU library.

=== Diversity and Inclusion ===
With the creation of the Gender and Development Desk (GADD), the university continues to advocates for the importance of diversity and promotion of inclusivity through its policies and practices. Since 2016, the university relaxed its dress code and allowed students to dress according to one's chosen gender. FEU also updated its facilities, installing all-gender restrooms in multiple buildings and added a multi-faith room for non-Catholics.

=== Student organizations and core groups ===
There are more than 60 student organizations under the supervision of the Office of Student Involvement, Guidance & Counseling, FEU Center for the Arts, Institutes, and Departments of degree programs in providing out-of-the-classroom experiences for the students to make them holistically formed.

The FEU Central Student Organization is the central student government of the university, which promotes student rights and well-being and at the same time develop programs and activities that will cater the needs of the student body inside or outside the university.

=== Student publication ===
The FEU Advocate, the official student publication of FEU-Manila, was established in June 12, 1934. Not as it is today, but an "unnamed ten-page tabloid," which was later renowned as "Advocate" in the latter part of the same year.

The publication covers a variety of stories, focusing on student life, events in and out of the University, and other relevant issues that are typically happening in Manila.

== FEU Group of Schools ==
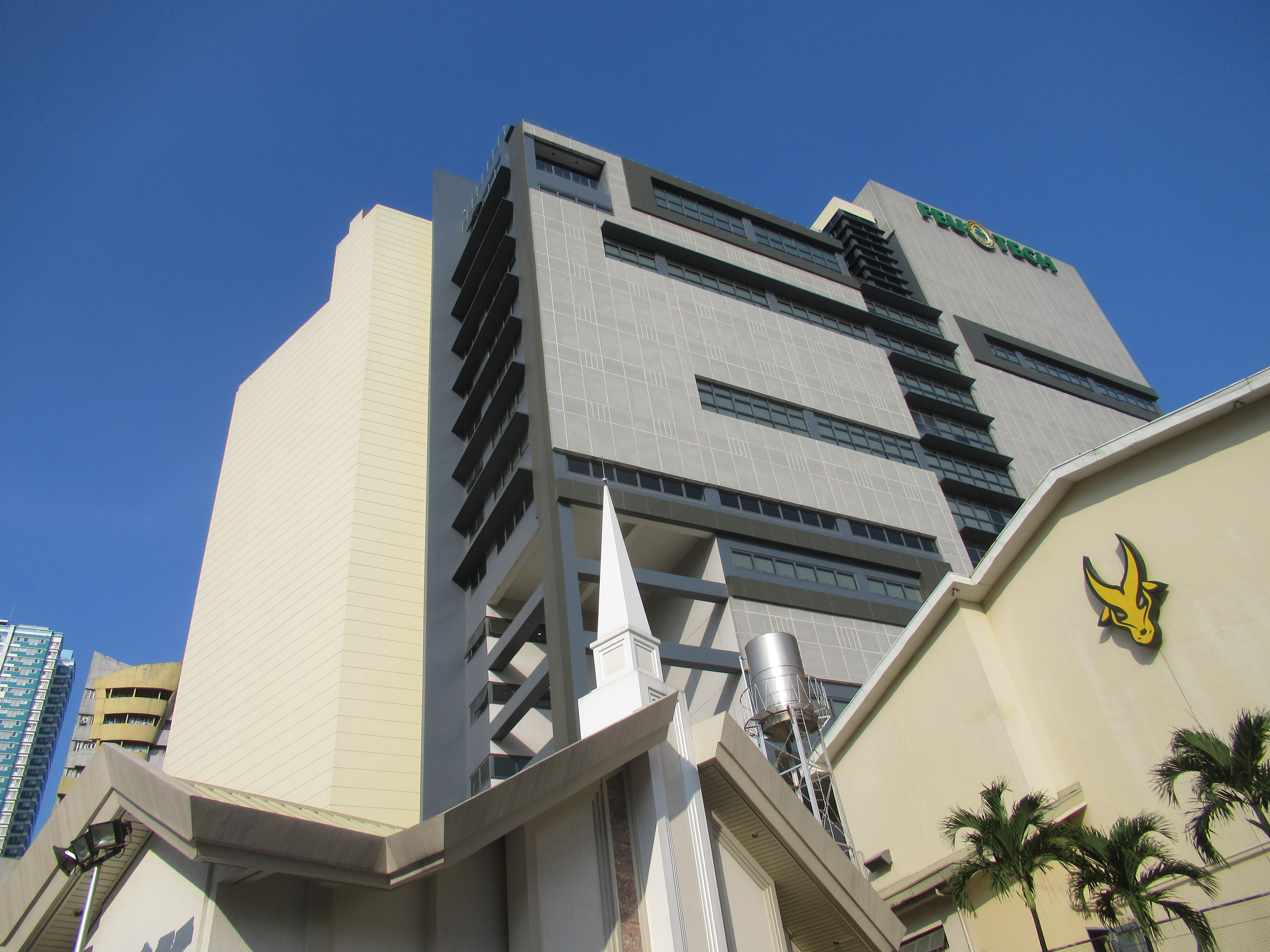
FEU Tech

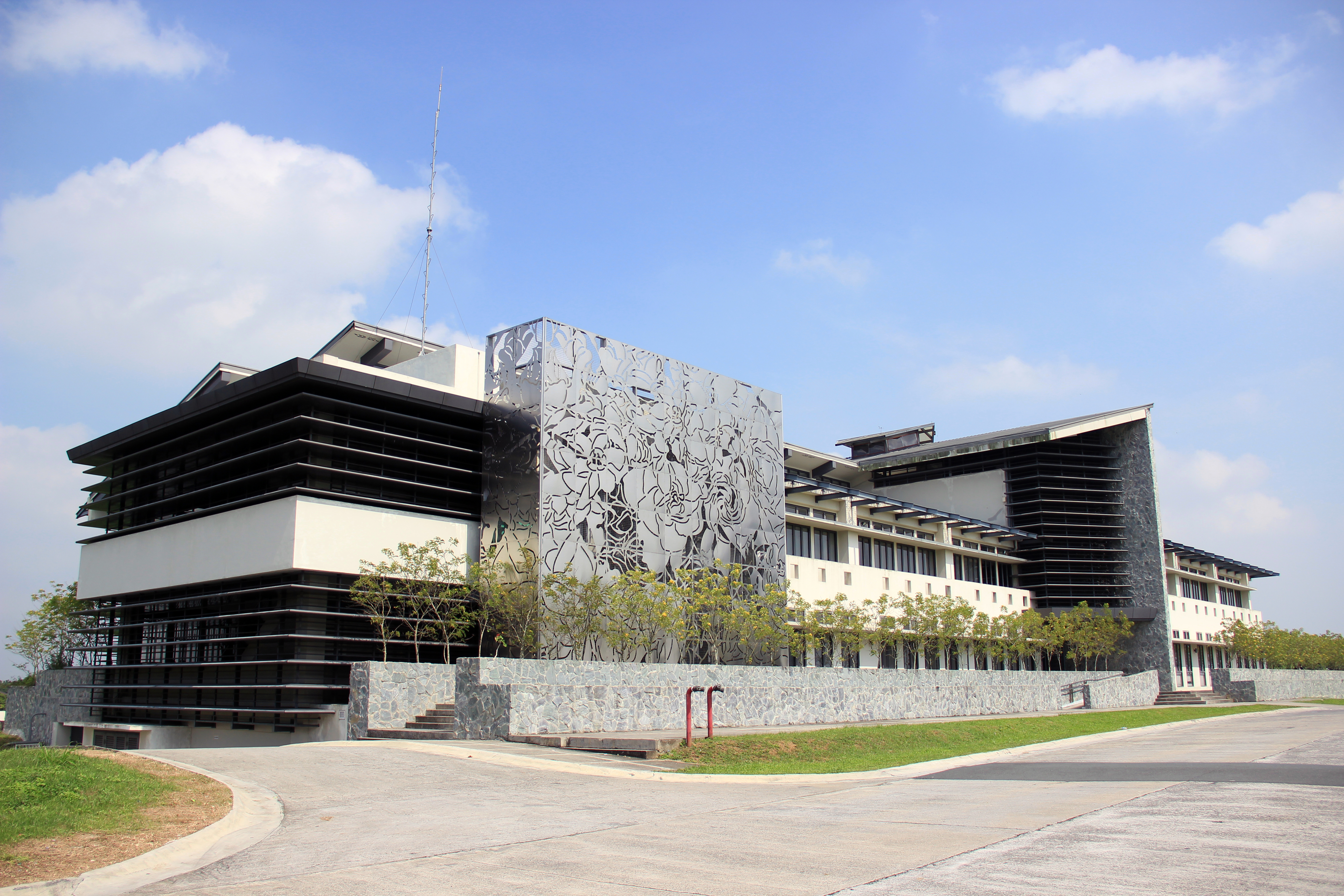
FEU Cavite

The FEU Group of Schools is a network of educational institutions in the Philippines that offer various academic programs and cater to different levels of education. It is composed of 7 legal entities, operating eleven campuses located across Metro Manila and Luzon. The student population is over 40,000+ students.

- Far Eastern University (FEU Manila), the main and oldest campus, is located in Sampaloc, Manila. It houses a wide range of academic programs under various institutes. It also houses research centers and serves as the administrative center for the entire FEU Group of Schools.
- FEU Institute of Technology (FEU Tech), located near the main campus in Sampaloc, Manila, focuses on engineering and technology fields. It offers programs through the College of Engineering and the College of Computer Studies and Multimedia Arts.
- FEU Diliman, situated in Diliman, Quezon City, is the largest FEU campus. It offers a comprehensive range of programs, including kindergarten, elementary, high school, College of Accounts and Business, and College of Computer Studies and Multimedia Arts. FEU Diliman also houses the FEU Sports Center and operates under the helm of FEU Tech.
- FEU Makati is a satellite campus of FEU Manila located in the heart of Makati's central business district. This campus primarily caters to graduate students pursuing programs in business and law.
- FEU Cavite, located in Silang, Cavite, is an extension campus of FEU Manila. It provides a complete educational offerings from elementary to senior high school and various programs in Tertiary education.
- FEU High School, a separate entity from the university, offers dedicated junior and senior high school programs.
- FEU Alabang serves as an extension campus of FEU Tech located in Muntinlupa. It offers programs in engineering, business, and computer studies at the college level, along with a Senior high school program.
- FEU Roosevelt is a private non-sectarian college system with campuses strategically located at the eastern part Metro Manila in Cainta, Marikina, and Rodriguez, Rizal. It offers both basic education and various programs in tertiary education.
- FEU Pampanga, formerly Colegio de Sebastian-Pampanga, is the newest addition to the FEU Group. Acquired in 2023 through Higher Academia Inc., a joint venture of FEU and United Laboratories, Inc. (Unilab), the school opened in July 2025 offering secondary to tertiary education programs.
- Far Eastern University – Nicanor Reyes Medical Foundation (FEU-NRMF), situated in Quezon City, is the medical campus of the university. While operating autonomously, it's still considered part of the network. FEU NRMF offers a comprehensive range of healthcare programs through its School of Medicine, School of Medical Laboratory Science, School of Nutrition and Dietetics, School of Nursing, School of Pharmacy, School of Physical Therapy, School of Psychology, School of Radiologic Technology, School of Respiratory Therapy, and a Senior High School program focused on STEM.

== Notable alumni ==
Since its establishment in 1928, FEU has produced national artists, Ramon Magsaysay Awardees, business tycoons, ambassadors, justices of the Supreme Court and other judicial bodies, technocrats in private and government sectors, finance wizards, acclaimed physicians, nurses, educators, theater and media luminaries and so many others in different fields of expertise.

Notable figures such as former Supreme Court Chief Justice Artemio Panganiban, business magnates Henry Sy (SM Investments), Lucio Tan (Fortune Tobacco and Philippine Airlines), Ambassador Alfonso Yuchengco (Yuchengco Group of Companies), CEO Benjamin Punongbayan (Punongbayan & Araullo), and Ramon Ang (President of San Miguel Corporation) have all been affiliated with the institution.

National Artist for Literature Alejandro Roces is an alumnus and former dean. A lecture series is held annually at the FEU in his honor.

FEU's legacy extends to the world of sports as well, with renowned international athletes emerging from its ranks. Anthony Villanueva (boxing), Felicisimo Ampon (tennis), Lydia De Vega (track and field), Johnny Abarrientos (basketball), Rachel Daquis (volleyball), and Janelle Frayna (chess) have all represented the university with distinction.

== See also ==
- List of colleges and universities in Metro Manila
