= Far Eastern University Institute of Education =

Institute of Education
- Established: 1934
- Dean: Marc Lancer Santos
- Location: Manila, Philippines
- Campus: Far Eastern University - Manila
- Colors: Baby blue
- Website: www.feu.edu.ph/index.php/institutes/institute-of-education/

The Far Eastern University – Institute of Education, or simply IE, is the academic institute offering teacher education of the Far Eastern University. It is one of the four earliest institutes that comprised the university in 1934.

Since 2016, FEU IE is recognized as a Center of Excellence by the Commission on Higher Education (CHED) and accredited Level IV by the Philippine Association of Colleges and Universities Commission on Accreditation. IE offers undergraduate and postgraduate degree programs in education.

== Brief history ==
Upon its establishment, the Institute of Education's concentration was in Home Economics; to emphasize the education of women as a driving force in the home. Hence, an integrated program and special courses in Clothing and Textiles, Cookery, and Interior Decoration were among its curricular offerings.

In 1946, the IE was granted Government Recognition for the elementary and high school teacher's certificate. In the same year, the University was empowered to grant the degree of Bachelor of Secondary Education as well as the postgraduate course in Education. In 1956, it was granted Government Recognition #399 for the Bachelor of Elementary program with majors in General Education and Special Education. In 1973, it was granted permission to offer the Master of Arts in Teaching, and four years later, its Doctor of Education program was recognized.

The Institute of Education was granted permission in 1997 to offer 18 units of credits in professional education. In 2001 and 2002, new programs were established – Bachelor of Science in Education major in Sports and Recreational Management (SRM) and the Teacher Certificate Program (TCP).

Under the vertical articulation program of CHED, the administration of the graduate programs in Education was transferred from the Institute of Graduate Studies to the Institute of Education in 2007.
