= Far Eastern University Institute of Nursing =

Nursing school in Philippines

Institute of Nursing
- Motto: Hominem Non Morbum Cura (Treat the Man, Not the Disease)
- Established: June 1955
- Campus: Far Eastern University - No. 851 N. Reyes Sr. Street, Sampaloc, Manila
- Status: Defunct
- Colors: Peach

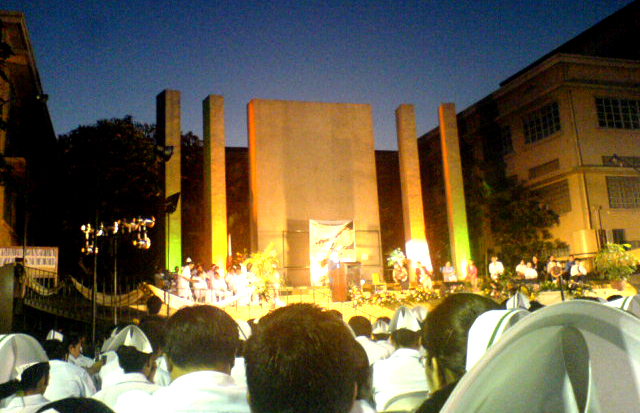
FEU-IN 50th Pinning Ceremony

The Far Eastern University – Institute of Nursing, or simply IN, was an academic institute for nurse education of the Far Eastern University. It was regarded as one of the top-performing nursing schools in the Philippines in terms of Philippine Nurse Licensure Examination performance and employment in various nursing settings. IN offered programs leading to a Bachelor of Science degree in Nursing and a Master of Arts degree in Nursing.

The Institute of Nursing's Virtual Integrated Nursing Education Simulation (VINES) Laboratory was the first nursing virtual laboratory in the Philippines and the second in Asia.

== Brief history ==
In 1955, three years after the establishment of the Institute of Medicine, it started as the School of Nursing. In its initial run, it only offered a non-degree Graduate of Nursing diploma. Started with a low population of enrollees, the School of Nursing has faced many challenges but worked its way up by continually enhancing its curriculum, re-calibrating its faculty, and establishing linkages with distinguished institutions. It eventually elevated as the Institute of Nursing in 1959.

In 1961, IN began offering the baccalaureate program leading to Bachelor of Science in Nursing.

In 2000, under the Institute of Graduate Studies, the degree of Master of Arts in Nursing was offered, then was later moved under IN.

In 2022, the institute became defunct as it was reformed into the Institute of Health Sciences and Nursing (IHSN).

== Deans of the Institute of Nursing ==
- Mrs. Teofista G. Villarica (1955–1960) Principal of three-year diploma program leading to a non-degree Graduate in Nursing (GN)
- Mrs. Lucrecia Llanera (1955–1960) Directress of two-year Advance professional Program
- Dean Felicidad D. Elegado (1960–1978) School of Nursing elevated to Institute status, first dean of the Institute of Nursing
- Dean Lydia A. Palaypay (1978–1995)
- Dean Norma M. Dumadag (1995–2006)
- Dean Annabelle R. Borromeo (2006–2009)
- Dean Glenda S. Arquiza (2009–2011)
- Dean Rosalinda P. Salustiano (2011–2013)
- Dean Ma. Belinda G. Buenafe (2013–2022)

== Affiliated hospitals ==
Below is a list of some hospitals in the Philippines currently accredited and affiliated with the Institute of Nursing, wherein students from the Institute are being trained and supervised by qualified Clinical Instructors from the university and nursing theories are applied as part of delivery of nursing care.

=== Metro Manila area ===
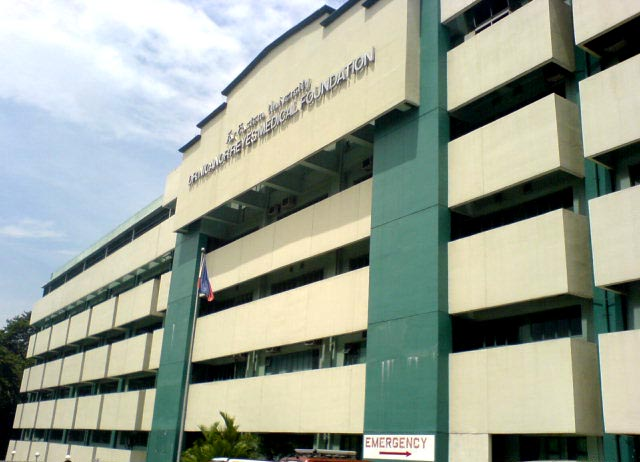
FEU NRMF Medical Center at Fairview, Quezon City

Jose Reyes Memorial Medical Center	Ospital ng Maynila Medical Center	Valenzuela General Hospital
FEU NRMF Medical Center	Tondo Medical Center	Dr. Jose N. Rodriguez Memorial Hospital
Quezon Institute	East Avenue Medical Center	Rizal Medical Center

=== Provincial hospitals ===
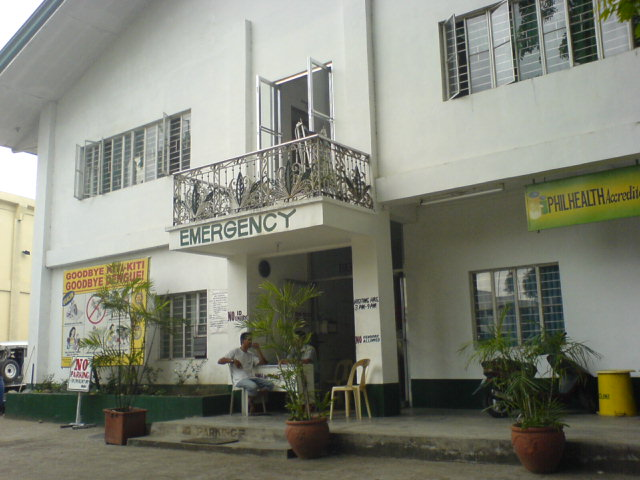
Norzagaray Provincial District Hospital at Norzagaray, Bulacan, Philippines

Mary Mediatrix Medical Center Lipa City	Batangas Regional Hospital	Occidental Mindoro Provincial Hospital	
Ospital ng Palawan	Bulacan Provincial Hospital Malolos City	Norzagaray Provincial Hospital	
Ramos General Hospital Tarlac	Urdaneta Sacred Heart Hospital Pangasinan	Cagayan Valley Medical Center	Antipolo District Hospital - Antipolo
Antipolo Doctor's Hospital	Jose C. Payumo Memorial Hospital Bataan	Tarlac Provincial Hospital	
Pres. Ramon Magsaysay Memorial Hospital Zambales	Pangasinan Provincial Hospital	Laguna Provincial Hospital	
Rizal Provincial Hospital	Morong Doctor's Hospital Rizal	Oriental Mindoro Provincial Hospital	

== Facilities ==
=== Virtual Integrated Nursing Education Simulation Laboratory (VINES) ===
The Virtual Integrated Nursing Education Simulation Laboratory or VINES is a hospital laboratory set-up closely approximates to the standards of the Joint Commission, the leading health care accrediting body in the USA, and other international hospital and infection standards in terms of bed-to-sink ratios, hospital door widths, functionality, work and patient flow. Located in the Nursing Building at the FEU campus, the laboratory is accessible to all students of IN.
