= Far Eastern University Institute of Accounts, Business, and Finance =

Business school in the Philippines

Institute of Accounts, Business and Finance
- Established: June 1928
- Dean: Maria Carmen Lapuz
- Location: FEU IABF Bldg. No. 909 N. Reyes Sr. Street corner R. Papa Street, Sampaloc, Manila, Metro Manila, Philippines
- Campus: Far Eastern University
- Colors: Orange
- Website: https://www.feu.edu.ph/institute-of-accounts-business-and-finance/

The Far Eastern University – Institute of Accounts, Business, and Finance, or simply IABF, is the academic institute offering accountancy and business programs of the Far Eastern University. It is regarded as the oldest institute of the university, established prior to the creation of FEU.

The Commission on Higher Education (CHED) accredited its Business Administration program as a Center of Development since 2015 while the BSBA and Accountancy programs are certified by the ASEAN University Network-Quality Assurance (AUN-QA) and granted Level IV status by the Philippine Association of Colleges and Universities Commission on Accreditation (PACUCOA).

== Brief history ==
The Institute predates the university itself from being established as a private institution in Manila years before the merger.

Started from a dream of having an exclusive accounting school for Filipinos, Dr. Nicanor Reyes Sr., then head of the Department of Economics at the University of the Philippines, left his position to follow this dream. With several prominent educators from the UP, he founded the Institute of Accountancy in 1928. Upon branching out to other fields related to accountancy such as economics, business management, and finance, the institute was renamed as the Institute of Accounts, Business and Finance (IABF) a year later, in 1929.

In 1933, Dr. Reyes would gain control over the stocks of the Far Eastern College, another institution in Manila, established by Don Vicente Fabella in 1919, and merges it with the IABF, giving birth to the Far Eastern University. IABF would continue to operate as an academic institute under the university, being its flagship institute.

Through the years, IABF has been hailed as one of the largest business schools in the country. With innovative ways to modernize the curriculum, FEU has produced a high rate of business and accountancy graduates, consistent top-performers in the CPA Board exams, and a list of distinguished alumni.

== Degree programs ==
=== Undergraduate programs ===
- Bachelor of Science in Accountancy
- Bachelor of Science in Business Administration
- Bachelor of Science in Internal Auditing
- Bachelor of Science in Business Economics
- Bachelor of Science in Human Resource and Organizational Development

=== Graduate programs ===
- Master in Business Administration

== Notable alumni ==
- Henry Sy, Sr. - Founder of SM Investments
- Ramon Sy, Sr. - Former Vice President of the Asia United Bank (AUB)
- Menardo Jimenez - Former GMA Network President
- Feliciano Miranda, Jr. - Former President of the Philippine National Bank (PNB)
- Benjamin Punongbayan - Founder of P&A Grant Thornton
- Alfonso Yuchengco - Former Philippine Representative to the United Nations
