= Far Eastern University Alabang =

Private university in Metro Manila, Philippines

FEU Alabang
- Motto: Charging South, Lead the Charge
- Type: Private Trimestral Coeducational higher education institution
- Established: 2018; 8 years ago
- President: Juan Miguel R. Montinola
- Senior Executive Director: Benson T. Tan
- Location: Wood District, Filinvest City, Alabang Muntinlupa City, Metro Manila, Philippines; 14.4107°N 121.0372°E
- Campus: Urban 1.8 ha (18,000 m^{2})
- Hymn: The FEU Hymn by Nick Joaquin
- Colors: Green Gold
- Nickname: Tamaraws of the South
- Sporting affiliations: UAAP
- Mascot: Tamaraw
- Website: feualabang.edu.ph

FEU Alabang is a private, non-sectarian trimestral, coeducational higher education institution located in Alabang, Muntinlupa, Philippines. Founded on July 21, 2016 as the sixth campus of the Far Eastern University, it offers Senior High School, Engineering, Computer Studies, Accountancy and Business programs.

FEU Alabang is an annex campus of the FEU Institute of Technology, headed by Dr. Benson T. Tan as Senior Executive Director. The deans, professors, faculties, and grading system of the university are all managed by FEU Tech.

Like its sister schools, FEU Tech and FEU Diliman, the college runs on a trimester academic system. An academic year starts in the second week of August and ends every June.

== History ==
FEU Alabang primarily caters to students in the Southern Metro Manila area. Established in 2018, the school offers various degree programs including science, engineering, technology, and accountancy.

In 2018, the 1.8 ha (4.4-acre) campus welcomed almost 2,000 students to the 14-storey academic building. The campus also features a 200-seater chapel and gymnasium.

In March 2020, FEU Alabang opened its gymnasium for the front line health care workers of the Research Institute for Tropical Medicine (RITM) and to help fight the COVID-19 that is rampaging across the country. The campus, being 300 meters away from RITM, allotted 50 beds and a 12-seater lounge as well as a shower, toilet and locker facilities.

== Academics ==
=== Senior High School ===
- Academic Track
  - STEM (Science, Technology, Engineering and Mathematics)
    - Specializations
      - Science: Health Allied
      - Technology: Information Technology, Computer Science
      - Engineering: Civil, Electrical, Electronics, Mechanical, Computer
  - HUMSS (Humanities and Social Sciences)
  - ABM (Accountancy, Business and Management)
  - GAS (General Academic Strand)

=== College of Accounts and Business ===
- Bachelor of Science in Accountancy
- Bachelor of Science in Business administration
  - major in Financial management and Business analytics
  - major in Marketing management and Multimedia Design
  - major in Operations and Service Management

=== College of Computer Studies and Multimedia Arts ===
- Bachelor of Science in Computer science
  - Specialization in Software Engineering
  - Specialization in Artificial Intelligence
  - Specialization in Data science
- Bachelor of Science in Multimedia Arts
  - Specialization in Animation and Digital Film
- Bachelor of Science in Information technology
  - Specialization in Animation and Game Development
  - Specialization in Web and Mobile Applications
  - Specialization in Business analytics
  - Specialization in Innovation and Business
  - Specialization in Cybersecurity

=== College of Engineering ===
- Bachelor of Science in Civil Engineering
- Bachelor of Science in Computer engineering
- Bachelor of Science in Electrical engineering
- Bachelor of Science in Electronics Engineering
- Bachelor of Science in Mechanical Engineering

== Campus ==
FEU Alabang's campus is designed by Arch. Carmelo Casas of Casas + Architects. He prioritized sustainability for the structure, using the sun's orientation and prevailing wind direction for light conservation and proper ventilation to students and faculties. The main academic building can accommodate up to 18,000 students.

In February 2020, the Our Lady of Lourdes Chapel was inaugurated. It was headed by FEU President Dr. Michael Alba, FEU Chair Emeritus Dr. Lourdes Reyes Montinola, FEU Chief Finance Officer Johnny Montinola, and Dr. Tan. In September, following its inauguration, Casas + Architects received 5 stars for Public Architecture from the Red Carpet Asia Pacific Property for their work on the chapel.
