= Far Eastern University Institute of Architecture and Fine Arts =

Fine arts school of Far Eastern University

Institute of Architecture and Fine Arts
- Established: 1970
- Dean: Ar. Isaiah Israel Susi, MSArch
- Location: No. 851 N. Reyes Sr. Street, Sampaloc, Manila, Metro Manila, Philippines
- Campus: Far Eastern University - Manila
- Colors: Maroon
- Website: https://www.feu.edu.ph/institute-of-architecture-and-fine-arts/

The Far Eastern University – Institute of Architecture and Fine Arts, or simply IARFA, is the academic institute offering architecture and fine arts programs of the Far Eastern University.

IARFA's architecture program is certified by the ASEAN University Network-Quality Assurance (AUN-QA) and is accredited Level II by the Philippine Association of Colleges and Universities Commission on Accreditation (PACUCOA).

== Brief history ==
The university first offered architecture in 1954 under the Institute of Technology, with Architect Elias Ruiz serving as dean of the Department of Architecture.

In 1968, the university launched a course in Fine Arts, major in Advertising. After two years, however, the university's board of trustees created the Institute of Architecture and Fine Arts (IARFA) with then executive vice president Nicanor M. Reyes Jr. concurrently serving as acting dean and Prof. Galo B. Ocampo as acting secretary and concurrent head of the Department of Fine Arts. Architect Benjamin N. Mascarenas headed the Department of Architecture.

Jesus M. Bondoc was named IARFA dean in 1971 when Executive Vice President Reyes was appointed acting president of the university. It was during Dean Bondoc's term that new courses in Interior Design were introduced. Among those curricular offerings were the two-year certificate course in interior design and a four-year course in Bachelor of Science in interior design. In 1973, architectural board review was offered to the university's graduates.

Ruperto C. Gaite took over Prof. Bondoc as dean in 1981. Dean Gaite effected significant revisions and improvements in response to the resurgence of cultural activities in contemporary Philippine society. He was responsible for introducing to the university the five-year B.S. Architecture curriculum. Dean Gaite molded and reshaped IARFA for six years.

Architect Marylou C. Ventura, a planner and environmentalist, was appointed dean in 1988. She upgraded the quality of art and architecture education in the university during her 10-year tenure. Architect Victoriano O. Aviguetero succeeded Dean Ventura, although moved on to other concerns after only two years and was thus succeeded by architect Miguel Carpio who remains the institute's dynamic dean wherein now he is the acting vice president for academic affairs in the whole university.

== Degree programs ==
=== Undergraduate programs ===
- Bachelor of Science in Architecture
  - Building Construction track
  - Housing Design track - This track deals with the design of green housing and communities, heritage conservation and traditional settlements, and current and future trends in urban housing
  - Urban Design track - This track incorporates principles and strategies for city living, environmental sustainability and ecological design.
- Bachelor of Fine Arts major in:
  - Studio Arts
  - Visual Communication
