= Far Eastern College Silang =

Private college in Cavite, Philippines

Far Eastern College – Silang
- Motto: Fortitude, Excellence, Uprightness and Compassion
- Type: Private Nonsectarian basic and higher education institution
- Established: 2009; 17 years ago
- President: Juan Miguel R. Montinola
- Director: Myrna Quinto
- Students: approx 1500
- Location: Silang, Cavite, Philippines; 14°14′14″N 120°57′35″E
- Campus: Suburban
- Hymn: The FEU Hymn by Nick Joaquin
- Colours: Green and gold
- Nicknames: Tamaraws, Baby Tamaraws
- Mascot: TamTam
- Website: feucavite.edu.ph

- Location in Luzon Location in the Philippines

Far Eastern College – Silang, commonly known as FEU Cavite, is a private nonsectarian basic and higher education institution located in MetroGate Silang Estates, Silang, Cavite, a municipality 43 kilometres (27 mi) south of Manila, Philippines. Established in 2009, it is the first subsidiary of the Far Eastern University (FEU) outside of Metro Manila.

In 2010, FEU Cavite opened its doors to Kindergarten, Basic Education (Elementary to High School) and Higher Education; while in June 2016, its Senior High School. The college offers a range of programs such as Accountancy, Business Management, Information Technology, Psychology, and Hospitality Management. It operates as an extension campus of FEU Manila.

== History ==
In January 2009, a ground-breaking ceremony marked the start of the construction of the FEU Cavite campus in MetroGate Silang Estates, an exclusive subdivision. Finished in 2010, it have two environment-friendly buildings, one for the Basic Education Department and the other for the Higher Education Department. The campus stands in six-hectare parcel of land.

In 2020, FEU Manila extended the school's program offerings with three undergraduate programs, two graduate programs, and a teacher certification program.

== Academics ==
=== Basic Education ===
- Pre-school
- Grade school
- Junior high school
- Senior High School
  - STEM (science, technology, engineering and mathematics)
  - HUMSS (humanities and social sciences)
  - ABM (accountancy, business and management)

=== Higher Education ===
- Bachelor of Science in Psychology
- Bachelor of Science in Accountancy
- Bachelor of Science in Accounting Information Systems
- Bachelor of Science Business Administration
  - Financial Management track
  - Marketing Management track
- Bachelor of Science Information Technology
- Bachelor of Science in Hospitality Management
  - Culinary Management track
  - Hotel Operations track
- Bachelor of Science in Tourism management
  - Events Management track
  - Travel and Tours Management track

==== Extension programs ====
- Bachelor of Arts in Political Science
  - Philippine Politics and Foreign Relations track
- Bachelor of Arts in Communication
  - Convergent Media track
  - Digital Cinema track
- Bachelor of Science in Medical Technology
- Master of Arts in Psychology
- Master in Business Administration
- Teacher Certificate Program

== Campus ==
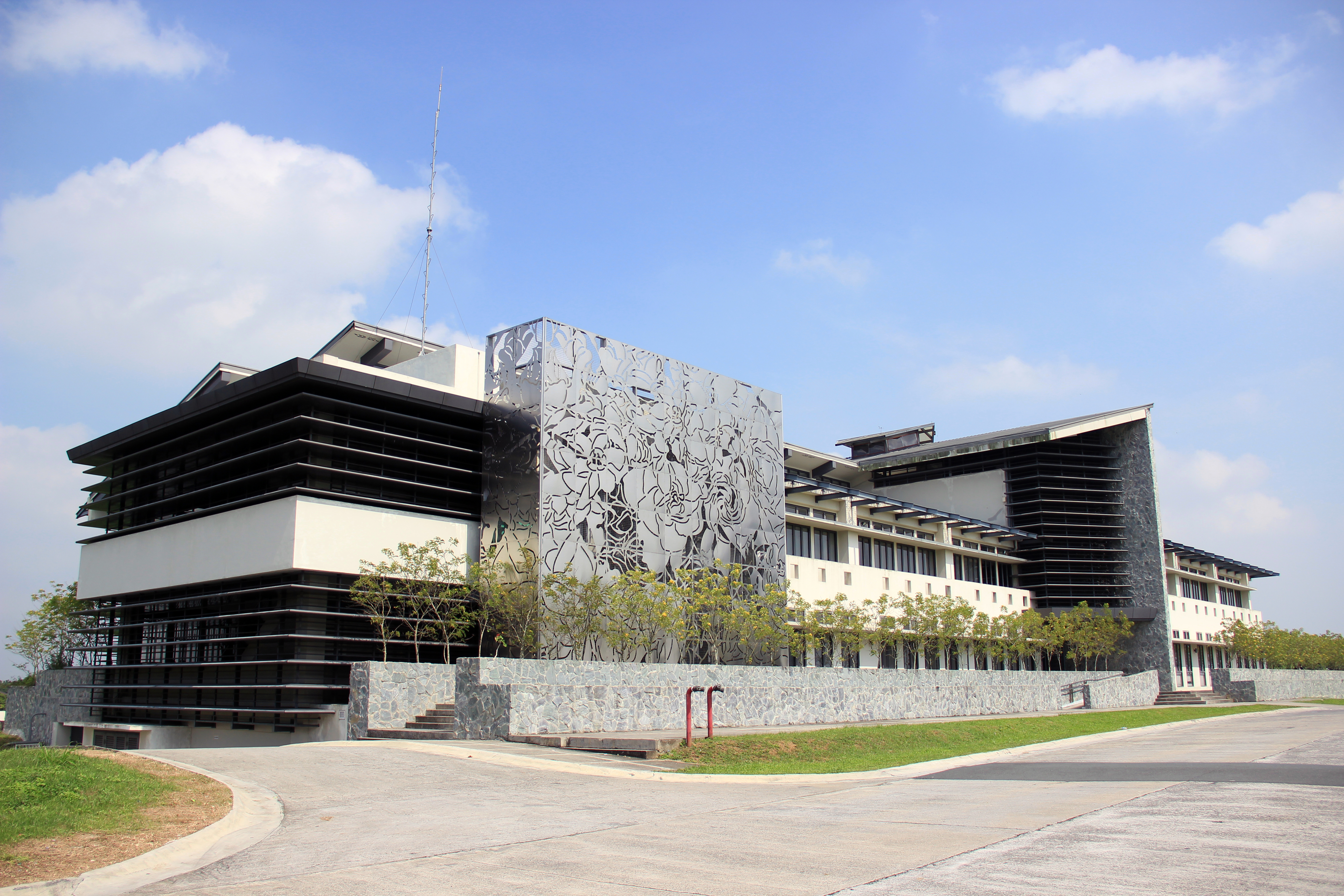
The FEU Cavite HED Building

=== Academic buildings ===
The FEU Cavite campus is unique for its structure and location. Aside from being inside an exclusive subdivision, its academic buildings are built on two separate locations, approximately 900 meters apart. The Basic Education and Senior High School Building is located near the subdivision's center while the Higher Education Building is near the subdivision's secondary entrance.

Designed by Archion Architects, high ceilings and large windows were incorporated into the architecture, allowing as much air and light inside as possible and to minimize the use of air-conditioning. Both buildings feature metal sunshades, design created by local artists, the couple Mona and Soler Santos.

In 2018, the four-story Basic Education Building has been upgraded due to the lack of classrooms to accommodate the Senior High School students. A new floor with five classrooms, two laboratories, and an administrative office has been added. In 2020, the building was honored at the National Commission for Culture and the Arts Haligi ng Dangal Awards as the People's Choice after garnering votes from the public through online Facebook voting.

=== Dormitory ===
FEU Cavite has its own dormitory, known as TAM-Bahay. It broke ground in November 2014 and was opened in June 2015. It stands on a 1.29-hectare (3.2-acre) piece of land adjacent to the Higher Education building. It has three floors and can accommodate 120 people. It also has a room for two persons with disabilities.

== Community ==
Since the school is located inside a private village, free shuttle services have been introduced to ease the students' commute. There are shuttles serving the town proper of Silang and the main gate of the subdivision where the campus stands.

In 2015, the official student publication of the college, Simbuhan, was launched.
