= Felixberto C. Sta. Maria =

Filipino educator and author

Felixberto Cangco Sta. Maria (22 August 1922, in Pampanga, Philippines – 30 December 2006) was a noted Filipino educator and author. He advanced the quality of higher education in the Philippines by improving the accreditation process of educational institutions. He introduced modern practices, changed the auditing method, and incorporated discipline as a part of the culture.

== Education ==
He was educated at the University of the Philippines (BSE, cum laude) 1948; Stanford University (MA); and Michigan State University (PhD) 1962, Sta. Maria joined the University of the Philippines (UP) as instructor right after graduation from college. He was one of the first if not the first Filipino to obtain a doctorate in Communication.

== UP Baguio ==
He became dean of the UP College of Baguio, where his own "college education" began. During his tenure, he put up a replica of the university's Oblation, a life-size statue of a naked man by Philippine National Artist Guillermo Tolentino. He started national art festivals that later became traditions in Baguio. He was eventually reassigned to the main campus in Quezon City and was appointed dean of the College of Education in 1967.

== UP Diliman, College of Education ==
Two years after his appointment, he was transferred without due process by then UP President Salvador P. Lopez and the Board of Regents. The transfer was a measure to placate the 1969 Student Strikes gripping UP Diliman.

=== Philippine Supreme Court - Labor Law Precedent ===
Sta. Maria sued the university officials in the Supreme Court for the illegal transfer and won. Sta. Maria v. Lopez, G.R. No. L-30773, (February 18, 1970) established labor case law precedents that regularly appear as questions in the Philippine Bar exams. He was reinstated. Then, he retired immediately after to join the Ateneo de Manila University, a Jesuit school, as professor of English and Communication. He opted to teach freshman English courses because he felt he could help the students more that way.

== Ateneo de Manila University ==
Two years after joining Ateneo, Rev. Fr. Pacifico Ortiz, SJ, then the president, requested him to establish the Ateneo's university press, now a leading scholarly publishing house in the country.

== Far Eastern University ==
Sta. Maria's last position before retirement was president of the Far Eastern University where he upgraded the standards of the private institution, and established the President's Committee on Culture (now called FEU Center for the Arts).

== Contributions to the quality of Philippine higher education ==
He was very active in education circles until his death. He was president of the Philippine Accrediting Agency for Schools, Colleges, and Universities (PAASCU), Federation of Accrediting Agencies of the Philippines (FAAP), Philippine Association of Colleges and Universities-Commission on Accreditation (PACU-COA) and member of The Fund for Assistance to Private Education (FAPE).

== Published works and family ==
Sta. Maria wrote Communication Strategies in Management (1995), The Philippines in Song and Ballad (1969) and numerous scholarly papers and articles. He was married to Teresita Laico Pronove and had three daughters: Cynthia Sta. Maria Baron, a published author; Thelma Sta. Maria Camus, a psychiatrist; and Sonia Sta. Maria Guerrero, a dentist.
