= Far Eastern University Diliman =

Private university in Quezon City, Philippines

- Motto: Transforming Lives
- Type: Private, Non-sectarian
- Established: April 1994; 32 years ago
- Academic affiliations: PACU | PAASCU
- President: Juan Miguel R. Montinola
- Senior Executive Director: Benson T. Tan
- Location: Quezon City, Metro Manila, Philippines; 14°41′4″N 121°3′48″E
- Campus: 100,000 m^{2} (1,100,000 sq ft)
- Hymn: The FEU Hymn by Nick Joaquin
- Colors: Green and gold
- Nicknames: Tamaraws, Baby Tamaraws
- Sporting affiliations: UAAP
- Mascot: Ferdie the Tamaraw
- Website: feudiliman.edu.ph

- Location in Metro Manila Location in Luzon Location in the Philippines

FEU Diliman, formerly known as FEU FERN College, is an educational institution at Sampaguita Avenue, Mapayapa Village, Diliman, Quezon City, Philippines. Founded in 1994 to commemorate the birth centennial of Nicanor Reyes Sr., founder and first president of the Far Eastern University (FEU), the institution offers programs from Kindergarten, Basic Education, High School, up to Tertiary Education.

FEU Diliman is the home of the FEU Baby Tamaraws, the high school varsity team of FEU, for the Juniors Division of the University Athletic Association of the Philippines (UAAP).

Like its sister schools, FEU Tech and FEU Alabang, the college runs on a trimester academic system. An academic year starts in the second week of August and ends every June.

== History ==
The campus it presently occupies was originally constructed for the Institute of Technology in the 1980s. After a few years of operations, the Institute returned to the campus in Manila.

In 1994, the Far Eastern University celebrated the birth centennial of its founder, Dr. Nicanor B. Reyes Sr., by establishing the FEU Nicanor Reyes Educational Foundation College (stylized as FEU FERN to be distinguished from the medical foundation, FEU-NRMF). The institution then offered baccalaureate courses in Accountancy, Business, and Information Technology.

In March 2018, the school's operations management was turned over from the Nicanor Reyes Educational Foundation to East Asia Computer Center, Inc. (EACCI), the corporation managing the FEU Institute of Technology (FEU Tech).

The shift is particularly advantageous for the school's move to espouse the Business-IT Fusion concept.

== Academics ==
=== Basic Education ===
Sources:

- Kinder
- Grade School
- Junior High School

=== Senior High School ===
- Academic Track
  - STEM (Science, Technology, Engineering and Mathematics)
  - HUMSS (Humanities and Social Sciences)
  - ABM (Accountancy, Business and Management)
  - GAS (General Academic Strand)

=== College of Accounts and Business ===
- Bachelor of Science in Accountancy
- Bachelor of Science Business Administration
  - major in Financial Management and Business Analytics
  - major in Operations and Service Management
  - major in Marketing Management and Multimedia Technology

=== College of Computer Studies ===
- Bachelor of Science in Computer Science
  - Specialization in Software Engineering
- Bachelor of Science in Information Technology
  - Specialization in Animation and Game Development
  - Specialization in Web and Mobile Application
  - Specialization in Cybersecurity

=== Other courses ===
- Bachelor of Science in Psychology
- Bachelor of Science in Tourism Management

== Campus ==
FEU Diliman has the biggest campus among the FEU schools, having 10 hectares (100,000 m^{2}) of land. Because of this, it became an ideal location for upholding FEU's athletic excellence.

In 2017, a groundbreaking ceremony took place for a new Basic Education Department Building. Led by FEU chairman Aurelio Montinola III, the event was attended by members of the school's board of trustees, administrators, faculty members, and students. The added structure is a symbol of the school's renewed commitment to address the demands and challenges of 21st-century learning.

=== FEU Diliman Football Field ===
Situated within the campus is the FEU Diliman Football Field, the Home of the Tamaraw Football Champions. The World Cup-sized artificial turf football field is a primary venue for hosting UAAP Football competitions and Palarong Pambansa.

=== FEU Diliman Sports Center ===
Seeking to develop more homegrown talents, a sports complex was built with the goal of becoming one of the premier college sports programs in the country.

Adding onto the artificial football pitch is the FEU Diliman Sports Center, a 3-storey building housing a maple-wood basketball court, the same flooring used in FIBA World Cup courts in Spain. Officially inaugurated in 2014, the sports center was built to be the home of the FEU varsity teams. It houses the administrative and support services for varsity sports including the Athletics Office, Team Conference Room, Athletes’ Dorm, Shower and Locker Rooms, Therapy Room, Team Tambayan and a Trophy Room.
