= Nicanor Reyes Sr. =

Filipino educator and founder of Far Eastern University (1894–1945)

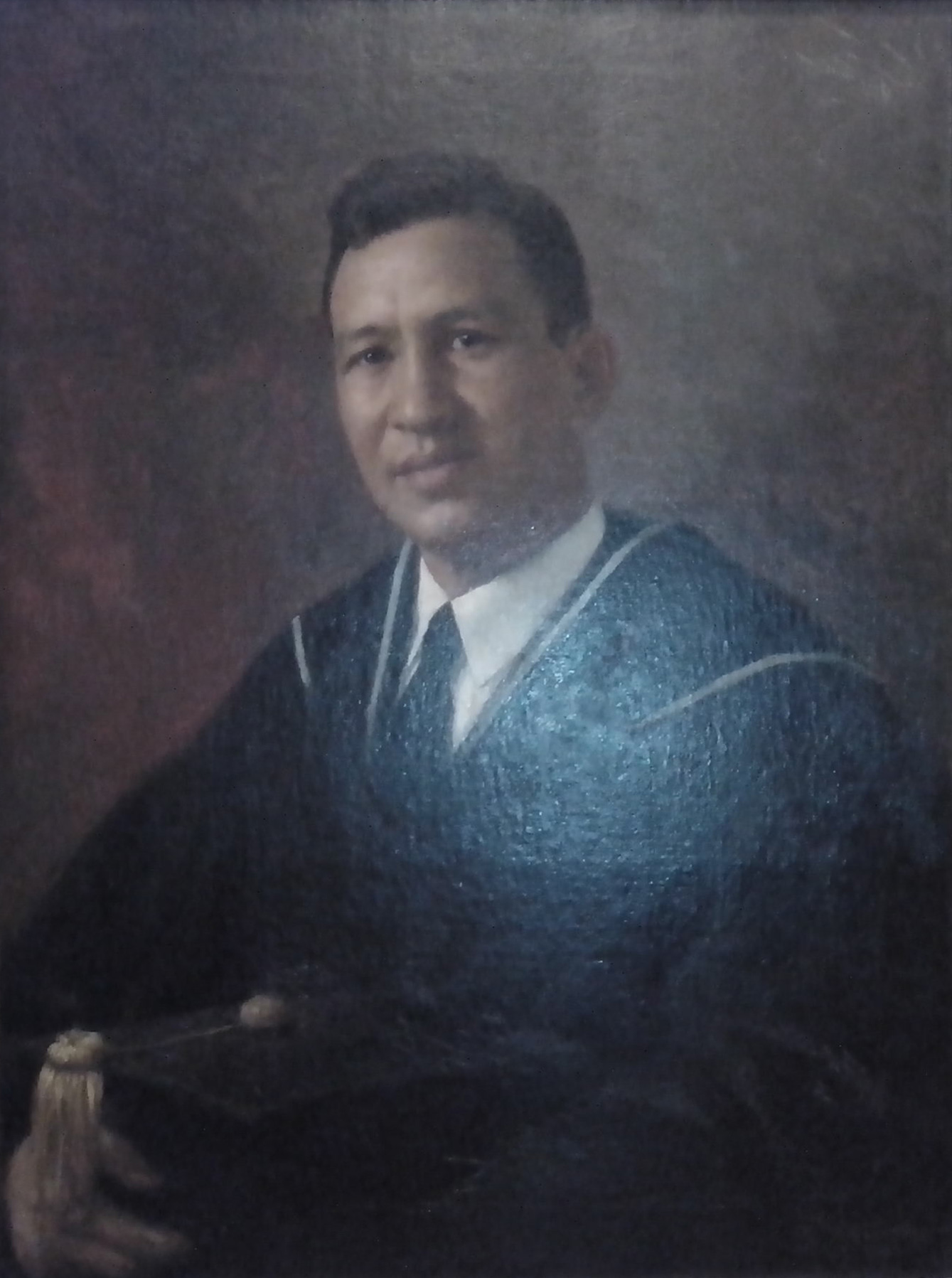
- Portrait of Reyes done by Fernando Amorsolo
- Born: Nicanor Icasiano y Reyes; 2 January 1894; Manila, Captaincy General of the Philippines
- Died: 9 February 1945 (aged 51); Manila, Philippines
- Resting place: Manila Memorial Park – Sucat, Paranaque, Philippines
- Education: University of the Philippines (A.B., 1915); New York University Stern School of Business (B.A., 1917); Columbia University (M.B.A., Ph. D.)
- Occupation: Educator
- Known for: Founder of Far Eastern University
- Title: Head, Department of Economics, University of the Philippines; President, Far Eastern University (1934–1945)
- Spouse: Amparo De Leon Mendoza-Reyes
- Children: 5

Nicanor "Nick" Baptista Reyes Sr. (born Nicanor Icasiano y Reyes; January 2, 1894 – February 9, 1945) was a Filipino educator. He was the founder and first president of the Far Eastern University in Manila, Philippines.

== Biography ==
Nicanor B. Reyes Sr was born to civil engineer Abelardo Icasiano and Macaria Baptista Reyes-Icasiano in Trozo (part of Benavidez Street nearby San Jose de Trozo Church), Tondo, District 2, Manila.

He earned an A.B. in 1915 from the University of the Philippines, a bachelor's degree in Commercial Science from New York University in 1917, and a Master of Arts degree in Business Administration from Columbia University the following year. He received his Ph.D. in Accountancy from Columbia - the first Filipino to do so, which was also the first degree of its kind to be awarded by Columbia.

Reyes was married to Amparo de Leon Mendoza-Reyes and had five children.

== Death ==
Towards the end of the Pacific War, during the Battle of Manila, the retreating Japanese forces killed Reyes, his wife, and their two youngest children on February 9, 1945, at their residence along Taft Avenue. Their remains are buried at the Manila Memorial Park.

== Legacy ==
- In 1970, the FEU Institute of Medicine, School of Medical Technology, and FEU Hospital were converted into a non-stock, non-profit educational foundation, the FEU - Nicanor Reyes Medical Foundation.
- In 1994, in commemoration of his birth centennial, FEU Diliman was established.
- Morayta Street in Sampaloc, Manila wherein the university is situated has been renamed after him.
