= Far Eastern University Institute of Technology =

Private college in Manila, Philippines

FEU Institute of Technology
- Former names: East Asia Institute of Computer Technology (1992–1998); East Asia College of Information Technology (1998–2003); FEU – East Asia College (2003–2014)
- Motto: Technology Driven by Innovation
- Type: Trimestral, Private coeducational college
- Established: 1992; 34 years ago
- Academic affiliations: PAASCU; PACU
- President: Juan Miguel Reyes Montinola
- Senior Executive Director: Dr. Benson T. Tan
- Location: No. 855 P. Paredes St., Sampaloc, Manila, NCR, Philippines; 14°36′15″N 120°59′19″E
- Campus: Urban
- Hymn: The FEU Hymn by Nick Joaquin
- Colors: Green and Gold
- Mascot: Tamaraw
- Website: feutech.edu.ph

- Location in Manila Location in Metro Manila Location in Luzon Location in the Philippines

FEU Institute of Technology, also referred to as FEU Tech, is a private, non-sectarian, coeducational higher education institution in Sampaloc, Manila, Philippines. It offers courses in the fields of Engineering and Computer Studies. Established in 1992 as East Asia Computer Center, Inc.(EACCI), an educational partnership of Asia Pacific Computer Technology Center, Intelligent Wave Inc., and Far Eastern University.

FEU Tech is an Institute of Technology. It is cited by the Commission on Higher Education as a Center of Development in IT Education (CoD).

FEU Tech operates under the aegis of the Far Eastern University; it follows and is directly connected to the University. It is headed by Mr. Juan Miguel R. Montinola as President and Dr. Benson T. Tan as Senior Executive Director.

Like its sister schools, FEU Diliman and FEU Alabang, the college runs on a trimester academic system. An academic year starts in the second week of August and ends every June.

== History ==
In 1936, the Institute of Technology was created in response to the increasing demand for trained engineers and technologists. It offered courses in architecture, engineering, and chemistry. Subsequently, after the Institute found itself squeezed between the government's cap on tuition fee increase and the rising costs of providing quality education in engineering, the administration decided to phase it out in favor of computer technology programs and had the Institute of Technology closed in 1996.

In July 1991, IBM Philippines together with SM Foundation, Inc. founded Asia Pacific Computer Technology Center (APCTC) in an effort to address the manpower needs of the growing Information Technology industry. APCTC later collaborated with the Far Eastern University (FEU) and Intelligent Wave, Inc. to set up a computer school, which was called East Asia Computer Center, Inc. (EACCI) Later, it was eventually renamed as East Asia Institute of Computer Technology.

On September 30, 1998, the Commission on Higher Education (CHED) noted the change of its name to East Asia College of Information Technology (EACIT).

On February 24, 2000, EACIT was identified by CHED as a Center of Development for Excellence in Information Technology Education.

In 2001, EACIT sought the approval of CHED to offer additional courses leading to Bachelor of Science in Information Technology and Bachelor of Science in Information Management. In the same year, FEU reopened its College of Engineering offering a trimestral (four years and one term) program. Full recognition of the programs were approved in 2004.

FEU bought out the shares of all incorporators and became the sole owner of EACIT in 2002. The following year, the College of Engineering was merged with EACIT and the two formed a technology education powerhouse known as FEU – East Asia College (FEU - EAC).

In 2014, FEU - East Asia College was re-named back to FEU Institute of Technology.

== Academics ==
=== Accreditations ===
FEU Tech has various programs accredited by the Philippine Accrediting Association of Schools, Colleges, and Universities (PAASCU):

- Level III: Computer Science, Civil Engineering, Computer Engineering, Information Technology
- Level I: Electronics Engineering

Programs under its College of Engineering are accredited by the Philippine Technological Council - Accreditation and Certification Board for Engineering & Technology (PTC - ACBET) meanwhile its College of Computer Studies and Multimedia Arts are accredited by the Computing Accrediting Commission of the Philippine Information and Computing Accreditation Board (PICAB).

FEU Tech joined the World University Rankings for Innovation (WURI) in 2020, placing at 72nd in 2023 ranking.

In 2024, the institution has been granted Autonomous Status by the CHED and has also joined the Quacquarelli Symonds (QS) World University Rankings, placing 118th in Southeast Asia and 10th in the Philippines.

=== Programs ===
==== College of Computer Studies and Multimedia Arts ====
- Bachelor of Science in Computer Science
  - Specialization in Software Engineering
  - Specialization in Data Science
- Bachelor of Multimedia Arts
- Bachelor of Science in Information Technology
  - Specialization in Business Analytics
  - Specialization in Innovation and Business
  - Specialization in Animation and Game Development
  - Specialization in Web and Mobile Applications
  - Specialization in Cybersecurity

==== College of Engineering ====
- Bachelor of Science in Civil Engineering
- Bachelor of Science in Computer Engineering
- Bachelor of Science in Electrical Engineering
- Bachelor of Science in Electronics Engineering
- Bachelor of Science in Mechanical Engineering

==== Department of Graduate Studies ====
- Master of Information Technology

== Buildings ==
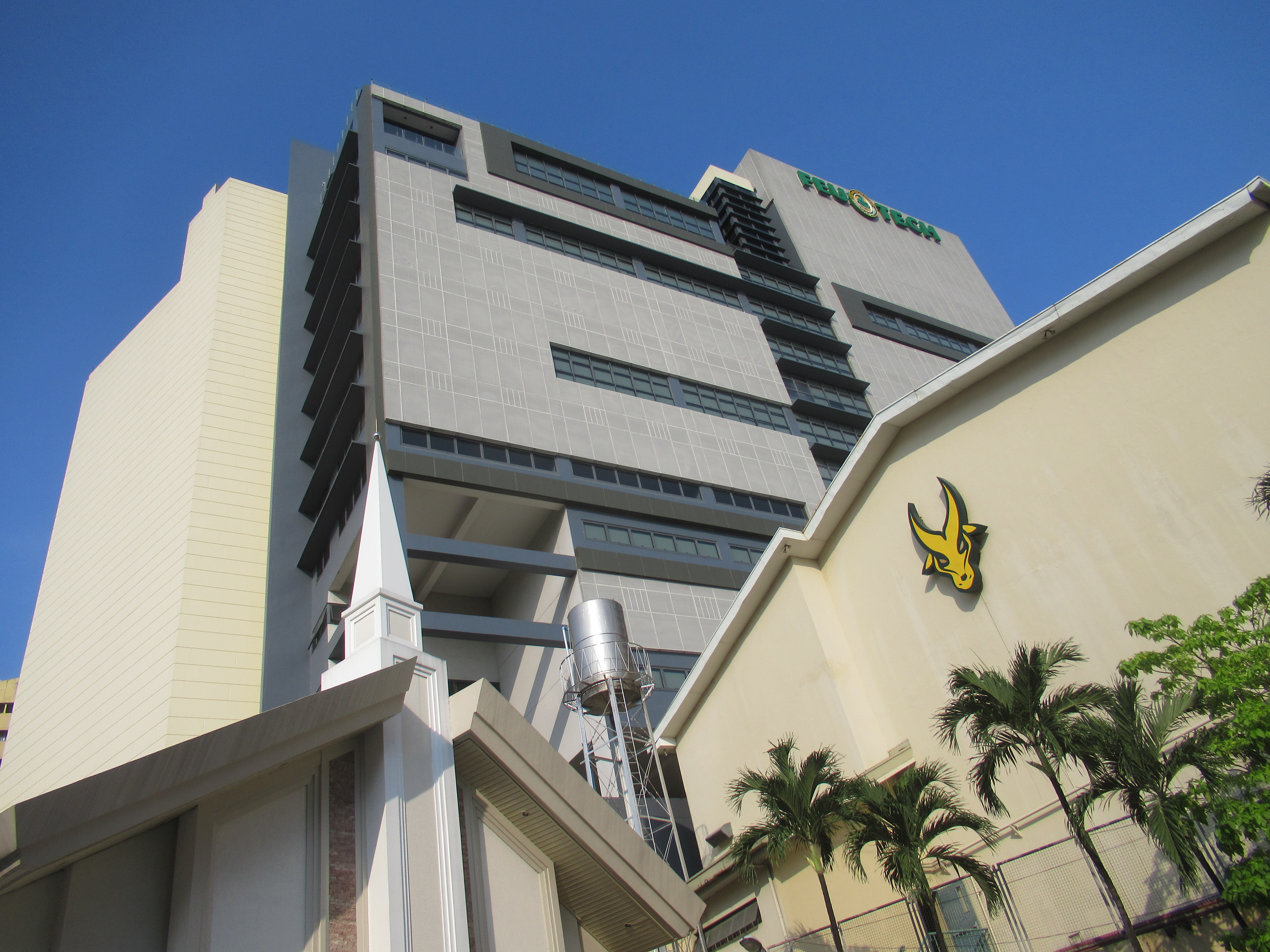
FEU Institute of Technology (FIT) Building

The FEU Tech campus sits near the main university complex, with its primary address at 855 P. Paredes Street, following its transfer in 2015. The 17-story building promotes sustainability within its design, with the usage of perforated aluminum panels for reduced heat gains with the building's northeast/southwest orientation, eco-friendly air conditioning, high-tech safety systems, an open-air lobby within the building's first three floors, and sky gardens located at the topmost floor. The building was designed by local architectural firm RCHITECTS, Inc., while Sy + Associates, Inc. was tapped as the structural engineer for the design of the building. ASEC Development & Construction Corp. serves as the general contractor for the project while A.F. Navarrete & Partners, R.A. Mojica & Partners, and NBF Consulting Inc. serve as the MEP contractors for the project. FEU also tapped SP Castro Inc. to serve as the project manager, while ASEA Design Group was tapped for the building's landscape consultants.

In spite of this, the school still occupies certain areas at the Engineering Building along Nicanor Reyes Street, for computer laboratories, and most notably, the FEU Tech Innovation Center.

=== FEU Tech (FIT) Building ===
- Lecture rooms, Academic and General laboratories (Engineering, Networking, Gaming, Drawing, Photography, Audio), Administrative Offices (Executive, Finance, Registrar, Academic Departments) Student Development and Support Services (IALAP, iCare, Guidance and Counseling, Health Services Clinic), Library, Swimming Pool, Covered Gym and Basketball Court, and Activity Areas (Study Areas, Student Plaza)

=== Engineering Building ===
- Lecture rooms, Computer Laboratories, Food Court, Car Park, FEU Tech Innovation Center, FEU Tams Bookstore
