= Far Eastern University – Nicanor Reyes Medical Foundation =

Private university in Metro Manila, Philippines

Far Eastern University – Dr. Nicanor Reyes Medical Foundation
- Type: Private, research, non-stock, coeducational higher education institution
- Established: 1952 (Institute of Medicine); 1971 (FEU - NRMF)
- Academic affiliations: PAASCU; FAAP
- Chairman: Nicanor C. Reyes III
- President: Juan Enrique J. Reyes
- Location: Regalado Ave., West Fairview, Quezon City; 1.5 hectares (3.7 acres); 14°41′54″N 121°04′02″E
- Hymn: The FEU Hymn by Nick Joaquin
- Colours: Teal and Gold
- Mascot: Tamaraw
- Website: http://www.feu-nrmf.edu.ph

Far Eastern University – Dr. Nicanor Reyes Medical Foundation, also referred to as FEU-NRMF, is a non-stock, non-profit medical foundation located at Regalado Ave., West Fairview, Quezon City in the Philippines. The institution operates a medical school and is related to, but independent from, Far Eastern University in Manila.

== Brief history ==
Upon the establishment and incorporation of the Far Eastern University in 1934, it has always been a part of FEU founder Dr. Nicanor B. Reyes, Sr.'s vision to set up a medical school alongside the university. This vision finally materialized years after his death.

=== Establishment as an Institute ===
In 1952, the Board of Trustees, under the chairmanship of Jose Cojuangco, commissioned a Medical School Committee to recruit faculty members and establish the institute. Faculties were contacted and equipment and facilities were readied. By June, the Far Eastern University Institute of Medicine (IM) formally opened its doors to its first students. The IM settled in the third to seventh floors of the Science Building within the campus. Headed by its committee members, Dr. Lauro H. Panganiban was installed as the first Institute Dean.

The Institute's courses were handled by luminaries in Philippine medical education, with Dr. Liborio Gomez in Pathology, Bacteriology, Parasitology and Laboratory Diagnosis; Dr. Daniel de la Paz in Pharmacology; Dr. Perfecto Gutierrez in Medicine; Dr. Gloria T. Aragon in Obstetrics and Gynecology; Dr. Carlos Sevilla in Ophthalmology and Otorhinolaryngology; Dr. Fe Del Mundo in Pediatrics; Dr. Tomas M. Gan in Hygiene, Preventive Medicine and Biostatistics; and Dr. Ricardo L. Alfonso in Surgery. Through the years, the departments and the courses of instruction were shaped by the visions of these heads of departments who were given a free hand in selecting their respective staffs.

Clinical training and instruction to students were given through affiliate hospitals such as the North General Hospital, San Lazaro Hospital, Rizal Provincial Hospital, Children's Memorial Hospital, Malacañan Clinic, National Mental Hospital, and National Orthopedic Hospital.

In 1960, the Institute continued its medical excellence by branching to another health science by establishing the School of Medical Technology.

=== Setting up the Hospital ===
In order to bring clinical training closer to the campus, groundbreaking of the University hospital commenced in the trapezoidal lot, north-east of the FEU campus. Designed by Felipe Mendoza in the International Style, its construction was estimated to be around ₱1.5 million. In October 1955, the FEU Hospital was completed and inaugurated. Headed by Dr. Ricardo Alfonso as Director, it would cater to the students of the IM, and later, the Institute of Nursing.

The Nicanor M. Reyes, Jr. Tower completed in 2016

=== A new beginning ===
In 1971, the Institute of Medicine embarked on a huge change. Together with the School of Medical Technology and the FEU Hospital, IM was re-constructed and made into a non-stock, non-profit educational foundation. Named after the university's founder, the Far Eastern University - Dr. Nicanor Reyes Medical Foundation (FEU-NRMF) was established.

With the installation of its Board of Trustees, chaired by Nicanor M. Reyes, Jr., FEU-NRMF gained full independence of its operations and management from the main university. FEU-NRMF would then transfer its classes from the Science Building to two buildings adjacent to the FEU Hospital (one being the Girls' High Building) and renovated them to fit the needs for medical education.

In 1995, due to the lack of space and the need of expansion of the institution, the Board of Trustees approved the relocation of FEU-NRMF to a 1.5-hectare (3.7-acre) lot in Fairview, Quezon City, with a new campus and hospital planned to be constructed.

== FEU-NRMF Institute of Medicine ==
Operated by the foundation, the FEU-NRMF Institute of Medicine continues its tradition and excellence, serving as a premier medical school in the country.

=== Academic Programs ===
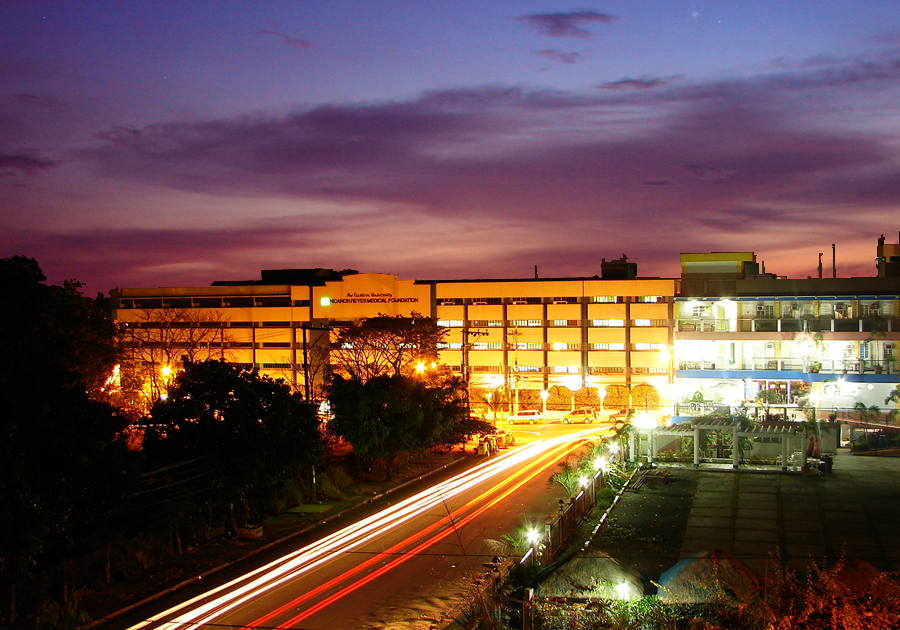
NRMF campus at night

Aside from its core Doctor of Medicine program, FEU-NRMF Institute of Medicine offers seven undergraduate programs in health sciences and behavioral science, and three postgraduate programs.

Undergraduate/College Programs

- Bachelor of Science in Medical Technology
- Bachelor of Science in Physical Therapy
- Bachelor of Science in Nursing
- Bachelor of Science in Respiratory Therapy
- Bachelor of Science in Pharmacy
- Bachelor of Science in Radiologic Technology
- Bachelor of Science in Psychology

Medicine Programs

- Accelerated Pathway for Medicine (APMed)
- Doctor of Medicine

Graduate Studies

- Master in Nursing (Non-thesis)
- Master of Public Health (Non-thesis)
- Master in Healthcare Management (Non-thesis)

=== Accreditations and Recognitions ===
FEU-NRMF is granted Autonomous Status by the Commission on Higher Education (CHED) in 2024.

The Philippine Accrediting Association of Schools, Colleges, and Universities (PAASCU) has accredited FEU-NRMF's Doctor of Medicine program a Level II status, while the Philippine Association of Colleges and Universities Commission on Accreditation (PACUCOA) accredited the Medical Technology and Nursing programs with Level IV Accredited Status, Physical Therapy, a Level III, Re-accredited status, Respiratory Therapy, Radiologic Technology, and Pharmacy, Level I, Accredited Status.

In 2020, the Professional Regulations Commission (PRC) conferred upon FEU-NRMF the coveted recognition as the “Only Top Performing” school of medicine in the country for its performance in the 2020 physician's licensure examination. FEU-NRMF singly held this distinction for four years straight, since 2016. It posted a passing percentage of 80.53 in 2016, 88.20 in 2017, 89.29 in 2018, 97.96 in 2019 and 91.60 in 2020.

Board Performance/ Performance in the Licensure Examinations
Program	Board Performance
Doctor of Medicine	The ONLY TOP PERFORMING SCHOOL in the March 2026 Physician Licensure Examination in the Philippines
BS in Medical Technology	Ranked 9th Top Performing School August 2023 Medical Technology Licensure Examination
BS in Nursing	100% Passing Percentage for First-time Takers in May 2022 (Rank Top 1 Top Performing School), May 2023 (Rank 5 Top Performing School) and November 2023 in Philippine Nurses Licensure Examination
BS in Physical Therapy	100% Passing Percentage for First-time Takers in June 2023 Physical Therapists Licensure Examination
BS in Respiratory Therapy	100% Passing Percentage for First-time takers in February 2022, February 2023, and February 2024 Respiratory Therapists Licensure Examination
BS in Radiologic Technology	100% Passing Percentage for First-time Takers in December 2023 Radiologic Technologists Licensure Examination

FEU-NRMF became the only Philippine institution to join the World University Rankings for Innovation (WURI) 2023, ranking 56th.

=== Campus ===
The Institute of Medicine Building is located at the left end of the complex's main facade, housing all learning spaces for its students. In 2010, the JCR (Dr. Josephine Cojuanco Reyes) Building has been completed, adding more classrooms, a gymnasium, swimming pool, and a fitness gym.

In 2016, the Nicanor M. Reyes, Jr. Tower was constructed due to the needs for additional classrooms, doctor's clinics, and parking spaces.

== Healthway FEU-NRMF Medical Center ==
Currently managed by Healthway Medical Network, the FEU-NRMF Medical Center promises to deliver a better healthcare experience and opportunities for its stakeholders.

=== History ===
On December 22, 1996, then FEU-NRMF Chairman Josephine S. Cojuangco-Reyes presided over the groundbreaking of the new P500 million medical school and hospital complex, assisted by Dr. Ricardo Alfonso and Dr. Philip S. Chua. In 2001, new facilities of the Medical Foundation were formally inaugurated. The ceremony was attended by President Corazon Aquino as guest of honor.

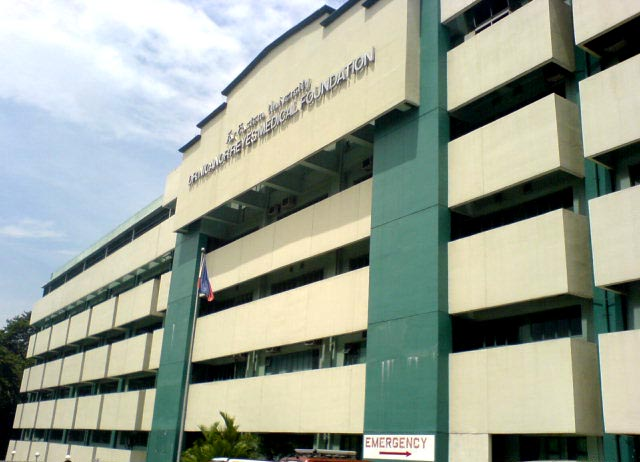
The FEU-NRMF Medical Center facade in 2007

The FEU-NRMF Medical Center is the only Level 3 university hospital situated in District 5, Quezon City. It operates with 300 Hospital Beds, 10 Clinical Departments, 10 Accredited Residency Training Programs, and 6 Accredited Fellowship Programs. It is also accredited by PhilHealth as a Center of Excellence and the Philippine Council for Health Research and Development (PCHRD) has named the school as a Center of Excellence in Research.

In 2023, Healthway Medical Network (HMN), the hospital and clinics division of Ayala Healthcare Holdings Inc. (AC Health), established a partnership with the institution. Under the agreement, HMN will assume management of the FEU-NRMF Medical Center for a duration of up to 24 months, starting in January 2024. Subsequently, a 35-year lease arrangement will facilitate the complete transfer of hospital operations. Throughout the interim management phase, HMN will oversee the clinical, financial, and administrative functions of the hospital.

=== Clinical Services and Departments ===
- Anesthesiology and Pain Clinic
- Cardiovascular section
- Child Health / PICU / NICU
- Clinical Laboratory and Pathology
- Community and Family Medicine
- Diagnostic Imaging Center and Radiology
- Emergency Medicine
- Out-Patient and Pay-Treatment Room
- Gastroenterology
- Internal Medicine
- Nephrology
- Neuroscience
- Obstetrics and Gynecology
- Oncology
- Ophthalmology
- Otolaryngology - Head and Neck Surgery
- Physical Medicine and Rehabilitation
- Pulmonary
- Surgery and Ambulatory Service
