= José Reyes =

José Reyes may refer to:

== Arts and entertainment ==
- José Reyes Meza (1924–2011), Mexican painter and costume and set designer
- José Reyes (flamenco) (1928–1979), Spanish flamenco singer with Manitas de Plata
- Jose Javier Reyes (born 1954), Filipino writer, director, and actor
- José Reyes Juárez, Mexican mask maker

== Politics and law ==
- J. B. L. Reyes (1902–1994), Filipino jurist; Associate Justice of the Philippine Supreme Court
- José Reyes Estrada Aguirre (1929–1989), Mexican politician, mayor of Ciudad Juárez
- Jose Reyes Jr. (born 1950), Filipino jurist; Associate Justice on the Philippine Supreme Court
- José Reyes Ferriz (born 1961), Mexican politician, mayor of Ciudad Juárez
- José Reyes Baeza Terrazas (born 1961), Mexican politician, governor of Chihuahua

== Sports ==
=== Association football (soccer) ===
- José Pilar Reyes (born 1955), Mexican football goalkeeper
- José Antonio Reyes (1983–2019), Spanish footballer
- José Rodolfo Reyes (born 1988), Mexican footballer
- José Miguel Reyes (born 1992), Venezuelan footballer
- José Reyes (Honduran footballer) (born 1997), Honduran footballer
- José Ismael Reyes (born 2001), Mexican footballer
- José Reyes López (born 2007), Spanish footballer

=== Other sports ===
- José Reyes (canoeist) (born 1966), Spanish sprint canoeist
- José Pérez Reyes (born 1975), Dominican boxer
- José Reyes (infielder) (born 1983), Dominican baseball player; all-star MLB infielder
- José Reyes (catcher) (born 1983), Dominican baseball catcher for MLB's Chicago Cubs

== Others ==
- José Trinidad Reyes (1797–1855), Honduran priest
- José R. Reyes (1902–1964), Filipino physician and hospital administrator
- José Reyes Vega (fl. 1920s), Mexican priest and military general
- José María Reyes Mata (1943–1983), Honduran revolutionary
- José J. Reyes (born 1963), Puerto Rican military officer
- José Antonio Reyes (astronomer), Spanish astronomer

== Other uses ==
- José R. Reyes Memorial Medical Center, Filipino hospital in Manila
