= Bridge House College =

Nigerian independent sixth form school

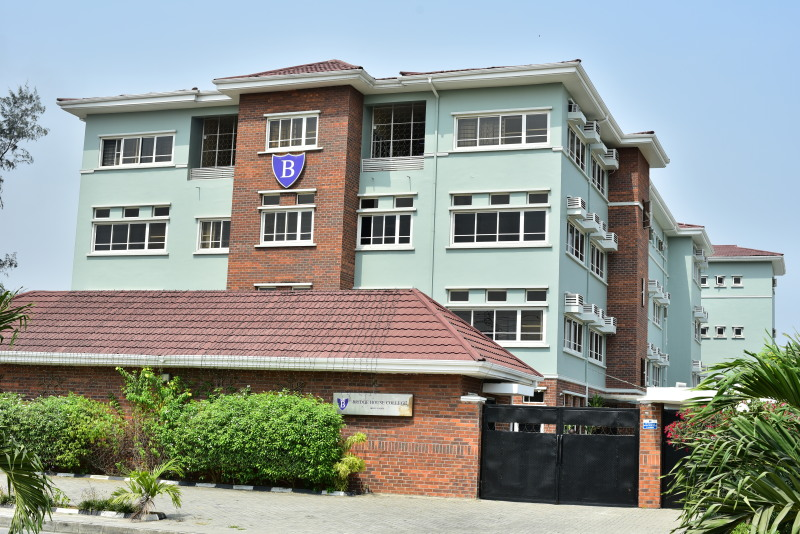

Location
- 8 Royal Palmdrive, Osborne Foreshore Estate, Ikoyi; Lagos; Nigeria

Information
- Type: Sixth form college
- Motto: Knowledge for Success
- Established: 2004
- Founder: Foluke Abdul Razaq
- Chair: Alimi Abdul-Razaq
- Principal: Ola Opesan
- Gender: Mixed
- Age: 15 to 21
- Website: www.bridgehousecollege.com

Bridge House College, abbreviated to BHC, is a Nigerian independent co-education Sixth Form College located in Ikoyi, Lagos, Nigeria. It was established in 2004 to cater for pre-university preparation for high school leavers 15–19 years considering university education. The College is an accredited centre for Cambridge A level examinations and Cambridge face-to-face teacher training.

== History ==
The College started at 1, olagunsoye Oyinlola, 2nd Avenue, Ikoyi with 8 students interested in studying in the UK until 2007 when it introduced other destinations including US, Canada, UAE, Ireland, Ghana, Nigeria etc. The college moved to its permanent campus in 2014. Since inception, Bridge House has educated more than 2,500 Nigerian students and kids of expatriates living in Nigeria.

== Curriculum and pathways ==
Bridge House offers the following curriculum:

- Cambridge A Level (AS Level – 1 year)
- Cambridge A Level (A2 Level – 2 years)
- Cambridge A Level (Accelerated Level – 1 year)
- US Foundation Pathway + SAT (1 year)
- University Foundation Programme
- Medical Foundation Programme

== Ranking and results ==
Bridge House College has been ranked among Top schools for the Cambridge A Level Programme in Nigeria as published by Edusko, Infoguidenigeria and LegitNG. With the Cambridge A level programme, students can get admitted into Second year in all universities in Nigeria.

At the inaugural British Council Recognition and outstanding Cambridge Learners Award Nigeria, which held in Lagos in 2017, four Bridge House students came top in Nigeria in 4 subjects; physics (International AS Level), business (International A Level), Economics (International A Level) and physics (International A Level).

== Scholarships ==
In 2018, the college awarded a two-year fully covered scholarship worth N9 million to the best performing student in Nigeria in the May/June 2018 West African Senior School Certificate Examination (WASSCE), conducted by West African Examination Council (WAEC).

The University of Birmingham announced that Bridge House students will be benefiting from a new scholarship category exclusive to Nigerian students applying for an undergraduate programmes at University of Birmingham starting in September 2020. The scholarship is worth £2,500 to be awarded to the highest performing Bridge House student for the 2019/2020 session.

== Affiliations ==
Bridge House College is affiliated to over 50 universities in various countries including UK, US, Canada, UAE, Ireland, South Africa, Ghana, Nigeria etc. The college is a member of the Council of British International Schools (COBIS), Association of International School Educators of Nigeria (AISEN), Associations of Private Educators in Nigeria (APEN) and have working relationship with the British Council Nigeria, Institute of Education Dublin, Ireland. Bridge House College's University Foundation Programme is accredited by Brooke House College, UK
