= St Paul's International College =

Location
- Moss Vale, New South Wales; Australia; 34°32′58″S 150°22′06″E

Information
- Former name: Aurora College
- Type: Independent secondary day and boarding school
- Motto: Latin: Omnibus Omnia (All to All)
- Denomination: Roman Catholic
- Established: 1986; 40 years ago
- Director: Angelina Fong
- Heads of School: Anne-Maree Scott
- Years: 7–12 and University Foundation Studies
- Campus: 8.1 hectares (20 acres)
- Colours: Royal blue, grey and light blue
- Website: www.spic.nsw.edu.au

St Paul's International College (formerly known as Aurora College) is an independent Roman Catholic secondary day and boarding school, in the Southern Highlands town of Moss Vale, New South Wales, Australia.

St. Paul's International College caters to Australian and overseas students from Year 7 to Year 12 and University Foundation Studies, with the majority of students coming from Asian countries.

== History ==
Built in 1878, Elm Court House was purchased in 1891 by the Dominican Nuns of West Maitland, who opened an all girls school on 2 February 1891 known as Mount St. Mary's Convent School. Later becoming known as the Dominican Convent school. On 22 October 1984 it was purchased by the Sisters of St Paul de Chartres opening in 1986 as Aurora College. In 1997 Sister Angelina Fong arrived as School Director and changed its name from Aurora College to St Paul's International College.

St Paul's was initially a senior secondary school catering for years 11 and 12 (ages 17 and 18). In 2009 enrolment was open for years 9 and 10 (aged 15 and 16), and in 2012 for years 7 and 8 (ages 13 and 14).

In January 2020, about 35 international students who had returned to school after visiting China were put into lockdown. The move was made following growing concerns about Coronavirus.

== Campus ==
St. Paul's International College is situated on 8.1 hectares (20 acres) of landscaped gardens in the central township of Moss Vale, approximately 1.5 hours south of Sydney.

== Subjects ==
The college has a range of subjects:

- Religion
- English
- Mathematics
- Science
- History
- Language (Chinese)
- Geography
- Commerce
- Technology and Applied Studies
- Creative Arts (Visual Arts & Music)
- Personal Development, Health & Physical Education
- Economics
- Business Studies
- Legal Studies
- Information Technology
- Physics
- Chemistry
- Biology
- Visual Arts
- Chinese for Background Speakers
- Chinese for Beginners

== See also ==
- List of Catholic schools in New South Wales
- List of boarding schools in Australia
- Catholic education in Australia
