= North General Hospital (disambiguation) =

North General Hospital was in East Harlem, New York City, U.S., 1979–2010.

North General Hospital may also refer to:

- North General Hospital, now José R. Reyes Memorial Medical Center, Manila, Philippines
- Nchanga North General Hospital, Chingola, Zambia
