= Carmen Latty =

Jamaican-Nigerian educationist and school administrator

- Born: Fairborn, Clarendon Parish, Jamaica
- Education: Clarendon College
- Occupations: Educator, school administrator, policy advisor
- Website: bridgehousecollege.com

Carmen Latty is a Jamaican-born educationist based in Nigeria. She has held senior administrative roles at Bridge House College in Ikoyi, Lagos, Roemichs International Schools in Ilorin, Kwara State, and the Corona Schools' Trust Council of all Corona Schools in Nigeria. She served as President of the International Facility Management Association (IFMA) Nigeria Chapter from 2001 to 2002.

== Early life and education ==
Carmen Latty was born and raised in Fairborn, in the hills of upper Clarendon, Jamaica, between the communities of John's Hall, James Hill, and Kay Valley. Her maternal family is from Tweedside, Clarendon. She attended Clarendon College, a secondary school in Clarendon Parish.

Latty has stated that her ancestry includes roots in eastern Nigeria; her mother's family is believed to have originated in the riverine region of eastern Nigeria, passing through Bonny Island before settling in Montego Bay. She holds a doctoral degree, and is referred to as "Dr. Carmen" by colleagues and associates in Nigeria.

== Career ==
Latty arrived in Nigeria in the early 1990s, initially drawn there by personal ties, having first visited in 1974 when she spent nearly a year in eastern Nigeria where her sister had married a Nigerian. She subsequently returned and settled permanently. She began her Nigerian career as a school teacher and later transitioned into school administration.

Early in her career in Nigeria, Latty served as administrator of the Corona Trust Council, which governs all Corona Schools in Nigeria.

Latty served as the third President of the International Facility Management Association (IFMA) Nigeria Chapter, holding the position from 2001 to 2002.

Latty served as Executive Director of Roemichs International Schools in Ilorin, Kwara State. Latty had responsibility for academics and administration at the school. She oversaw the school's internationalisation, attracting students from states across Nigeria and from countries including India, Saudi Arabia, Lebanon, England, and the United States. At Roemichs' third graduation ceremony in July 2013, themed "Unleashing Nigeria's Potential Through Excellence in Education," Latty co-ordinated the launch of the school's maiden edition of a special publication, alongside the Executive Chairman.

Latty subsequently joined Bridge House College (BHC) in Ikoyi, Lagos as the College Administrator, a role in which she held until 2019.

Latty has also been associated with Virtue Educational and Allied Services, a consulting firm, where her profile is listed as a senior associate.

== Published work ==
Latty has written books related to her experiences in Nigeria. She authored an autobiography titled Dare To Be, in which she traces aspects of her personal history including her Jamaican roots and her ancestral connections to eastern Nigeria.
