= AY Foundation =

Charity foundation based in the Philippines

- Legal status: Charity Foundation (Not For Profit)
- Headquarters: Philippines

AY Foundation (AY) is a charity foundation based in Philippines, that was established with the aim of Welfare for the Society. The foundation is focused in Child Development, Woman Empowerment, Old-Age Home & Also Provides Relief during Pandemic all across the Philippines.

== History ==
The AY Foundation, Inc. (AYF) was founded in 1970 by Alfonso Yuchengco as the Bayanihan Foundation to administer an educational fund for the children of Grepalife employees and sales associates. It was renamed A Wise Foundation in 1983. The foundation was renamed AY Foundation, Inc in 1988.

== Vision and mission ==
The AY Foundation formulates its vision as follows:

A focused professional foundation that will make an impact on moral values development and science and technology education in Philippine society.

The AY Foundation has given itself the following mission:

To contribute to the improvement of the quality of life of the Filipino – especially the poor and the disadvantaged – particularly in the formation of moral values and in the education of our youth, and advancement of the public well-being through improved healthcare services.

== Goals and activities ==
The foundation formulates as its goal to "provide educational assistance to financially needy but deserving Filipino youth, especially members of the indigenous groups, center-based street children, and dependents of employees of the YGC companies".

It has several social development programs that focus mainly on education, health and nutrition. They relate to:

- Scholarship
- Medical Mission
- National Discipline Award
- Blessed Teresa of Calcutta Award

=== Scholarship ===
The foundation awards scholarship grants to street children, to indigent children, and to dependents of YGC employees.

=== Medical Mission ===
AYF has performed more than 11,000 surgical procedures and more than 62,000 medical consults in various parts of the Philippines.

=== National Discipline Award ===
In 1990, AYF established the National Discipline Award, which aims to give recognition to graduating high school students who consistently exemplify the virtue of discipline in school and in the community.

=== Blessed Teresa of Calcutta Award ===
The Blessed Teresa of Calcutta Award, known up to 2003 as the Mother Teresa Award, was launched in 1983. The award recognizes individuals who dedicate most of their lives to helping the "poor of the poor".

Awardees have been:

- 1993: Anthony Hoffste, a priest who spent 35 years tending to the needs of the leprous at Tala Leprosarium
- 1986: Lilia Castro, a former nurse who spent more than 30 years of her life serving a minority community in the hinterlands of Surigao del Norte.
- 1989: Aloysius Schwartz, a parish priest who founded the Boystown and Girlstown complexes in Bacolod, Sta. Mesa for orphans and children of underprivileged families
- 1990: Miguel C. Cruz, a physician who has rendered free medical services to needy villagers of barrios in Bukidnon and Misamis Oriental
- 1991: Teresita K. Arandia, a nun who has tended to the needs of paraplegics in Bahay Pangarap, Bahay Kakayahan, and Bahay Liwanag, and in other homes for the disabled
- 1992: Aleli G. Quirino, founder and director of the St. Martin de Porres Hospital (formerly St. Martin de Porres Clinic)
- 1993: Eva D. Maamo, a physician who led several medical missions across the Philippines and provided free medical clinics and feeding centers to depressed areas
- 1994: Soledad L. Bersamina, a nun working with forgotten and displaced Aetas at Floridablanca and Porac, Pampanga
- 1995: Pierno Rolliardi, a parish priest involved as the “Builder of the Emmaus Village” in depressed areas in Moonwalk, Talon, Las Piñas
- 1996: Esperanza G. Valenzona, a lawyer active in advocacy for juvenile delinquents and street children in Cebu City
- 1998: Pierre T. Tritz, a Jesuit missionary and founder of the Educational Research and Development Assistance Foundation which supports schooling, and Milagros A. Dayrit, involved in the Mother Rosa Memorial Foundation for empowering the poor
- 1999: Paula Valeriana V. Baertz, a missionary engaged in nursing the disabled at the National Orthopedic Hospital and Tahanang Walang Hagdanan, and Milagros B. Alarcon, a missionary who co-founded the Catholic Tokyo International Center and gave aid to Filipinos in Japan
- 2000: Gratian Murry, priest and founder of the Bacolod Boy’s Home and St. Joseph’s High School, who has given aid to thousands of street children and orphans of Bacolod, and Maggiorina N. Arenas, who has worked with the Mangyans in the mountains of Oriental Mindoro
- 2001: Charles van den Ouwelant, Bishop Emeritus and founder of “A Chance for The Poor Foundation” who has provided free medical aid to the indigenous people of Mindanao, particularly the Lumads, and Leonor Ines-Luciano, regarded as a champion of humanitarian law, who has organized various programs for youth offenders, abused women and abandoned children
- 2002: Laureana Franco (also known as "Ka Luring"), teaching catechism to children in public schools, to seminarians, and to lay people in the archdiocese of Manila, and recipient of the Pro Ecclesia et Pontifice in 1990, and Carmen V. Locsin (also known as Sister Remedios), a Filipina missionary nun in Japan ministering especially to Filipino migrants or entertainment workers who were abused by their Japanese employers or husbands
- 2003: Helena Z. Benitez, an educator, legislator, diplomat, civic leader, promoter of art and culture, human rights advocate, and "a true servant of the poor"
- 2004: Jaime L. Cardinal Sin, cleric who was instrumental in the defeat of the Marcos and Estrada regimes and who spoke out for the poor
- 2005: Lucina C. Alday, an advocate of the underprivileged youth and women for more than 65 years in different public offices, who implemented programs for out-of-school and delinquent youths and women most susceptible to exploitation
- 2006: Rufino G. Tima, an anthropologist who has actively advanced the rights and welfare of the Aetas of Zambales, assisting them in securing and developing their ancestral land and reestablishing their cultural roots
- 2007: Ruben J. Villote, a priest who founded the Center for Migrant Youth in 1982
- 2008: Fe del Mundo, a pediatrician, scientist, educator, author, public health advocate, humanitarian, and founder of several children’s health and welfare institutions including, in 1957, the Children’s Memorial Hospital
- 2009: Irene K. Yusingco, a philanthropist who organized and motivated numerous charity organizations in their work for street children and the poor
- 2010: Maria N. Fracaso, a nun who has served impoverished Filipinos since 1962
- 2011: Dolores Pita (Maria Dolores “Maruxa” Pita), an educator who established the Makabata School Foundation, Inc.
- 2012: Reylindo E. Ortega, who established Pag-asa ng Pamilya Scholarship Foundation Inc., Tahanan ng Pagmamahal Children’s Home Inc., and Grace to Be Born, Inc., and who has spent over 43 years giving scholarships to the underprivileged and providing shelter to abandoned children and to mothers in crisis together with their babies.
- 2013: Roel Z. Cagape, a physician and philanthropist who has provided medical assistance to tribal communities in remote areas, including the “Ambulansyang Kabayo” (horse ambulance), “I-txt Si Doc” (e-health consultation by mobile phone) and child feeding programs in the mountains of Sarangani Province
- 2014: Maria Angeles Peypoch Fullerton (Maria Angeles "Lita" Peypoch Fullerton), who in 1989 founded the Chosen Children Village Foundation that provides care and rehabilitation to mentally or physically challenged children
- 2015: Divina T. Fabra, a missionary who lives with the Aetas of Banauen, Zambales, working to improve their literacy and healthcare
- 2016: Leo Schmitt, a priest who has spent 40 years helping the marginalized poor communities and informal settlers in the Philippines and whose housing projects have been examples for similar projects by the Philippine government

== Funding ==
As a corporate foundation, AYF is funded, at least in part, by donations from the businesses of the Yuchengco Group of Companies.
