= Foluke Abdulrazaq =

Nigerian banker, educator, and public servant

Foluke Kafayat Abdulrazaq OON, JP
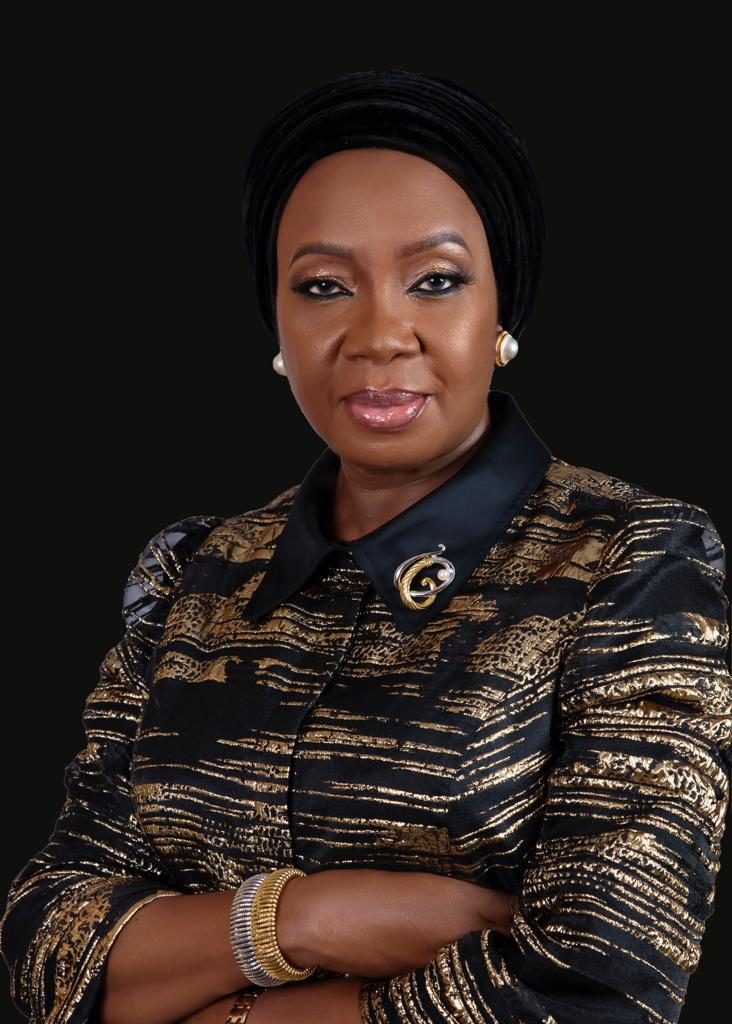
- Born: April 16, 1956 (age 70); Lagos State, Nigeria
- Education: University of Ibadan (M.Sc. Banking and Finance); Harvard Business School (Executive Education)
- Occupations: Banker, educator, public servant
- Spouse: Alimi Abdul-Razaq
- Awards: Order of the Niger (OON); Lagos State Woman of Excellence Award (1999); Justice of the Peace (JP, 1999)
- Website: bridgehousecollege.com

Foluke Kafayat Abdulrazaq (born 16 April 1956) is a Nigerian banker, educator, and public servant. She is the founder and executive director of Bridge House College, an independent sixth-form co-educational college located in Ikoyi, Lagos, Nigeria. She served as the first female Commissioner for Finance of Lagos State and has held senior positions across Nigeria's banking, finance, and corporate sectors for over three decades.

== Early life and education ==
Foluke Kafayat Abdulrazaq was born on 16 April 1956. She hails from the Abibu Oki family of Lagos State and the Labisi Olugbesan clan of Ibadan. She pursued higher education at the University of Ibadan, where she earned a Master of Science (M.Sc.) degree in Banking and Finance. She later attended Harvard Business School in Boston, Massachusetts, as part of executive education programmes.

== Career ==
=== Banking and financial services ===
Abdulrazaq began her professional career in the banking sector, working at the defunct IBWA (International Bank of West Africa), which subsequently became Afribank. She later joined Credite Bank Nigeria Limited, and in September 1995 was appointed by the Central Bank of Nigeria and the Nigeria Deposit Insurance Corporation (NDIC) as the Executive Chairman of the Interim Management Board of Credite Bank Nigeria Limited.

Following her tenure in public service (1997–1999), she was appointed Executive Director of ML Securities Limited (1999–2001), a stockbroking firm, and subsequently worked at the Nigerian Security Printing and Minting Company Limited, where she led several departments including Administration Management Services and Commercial and Corporate Development.

She served as a non-executive Director of United Bank for Africa (UBA) from 2008 to 2020, during which time she chaired the Board's Credit Committee and sat on the Statutory Audit, Nominations, and Governance committees. In recognition of her boardroom contributions, she also served as Vice-President of the Bank Directors' Association of Nigeria (BDAN).

She served on the Board of Julius Berger Plc from 1997 to 2000.

In June 2020, Abdulrazaq was appointed Vice Chairman of Transnational Corporation of Nigeria Plc (Transcorp), one of Nigeria's largest diversified conglomerates and owner of Transcorp Power Limited and the Transcorp Hilton Abuja. She was noted as the first occupant of the Vice Chairman role in Transcorp's history. Commenting on her appointment, Tony Elumelu, Chairman of Transcorp, stated she was "one of Nigeria's senior business leaders and public servants" with a track record of championing women in business.

=== Public service ===
Abdulrazaq served as Commissioner for Finance of Lagos State from 1997 to 1999 under the administration of then Military Administrator, retired General Buba Marwa. She is widely cited as the first and only female Commissioner for Finance in Lagos State's history.

During her tenure as Finance Commissioner, the broad policies underpinning the Lagos State Accelerated Revenue Generation Programme (ARGP) were formulated — a revenue template widely credited as the foundation for Lagos State's contemporary fiscal efficiency. She also served as Commissioner for Women Affairs and Social Development.

In addition to these roles, she was:

- Chairman of the Lagos State Tenders' Board
- Member of the Federal Account Allocation Committee (FAAC)
- Member of the Lagos State Executive Council

=== Education sector ===
In 2004, Abdulrazaq founded Bridge House College (BHC) in Ikoyi, Lagos, an independent sixth-form co-educational college. The college was established to prepare Nigerian secondary school leavers for entry into universities both locally and internationally, addressing the "Japa Syndrome" of students emigrating abroad for education.

By its 20th anniversary in 2024, BHC had graduated over 3,000 A-Level students who entered professional life and entrepreneurship in Nigeria and abroad. The college maintains membership in the Council of British International Schools (COBIS) and has earned numerous academic accolades from Cambridge Assessment International Education (CAIE), including top-in-the-world and top-in-Nigeria awards in subjects such as Law, Physics, Mathematics, Biology, Chemistry, Economics, and Business.

As Executive Director, Abdulrazaq has spoken on educational reform in Nigeria, particularly regarding access, quality, and the integration of technology. Speaking at the Bridge House College graduation ceremony in 2024 — attended by Tony Elumelu, Chairman of Heirs Holdings — she highlighted the significance of artificial intelligence in education and called for moral instruction alongside academic excellence, noting that over 10 million Nigerian children remain out of school.

== Honours and awards ==
- Order of the Niger (OON) — national honour conferred by the Federal Government of Nigeria
- Lagos State Woman of Excellence Award (1999)
- Justice of the Peace (JP), Lagos State (1999)

== Personal life ==
Abdulrazaq is married to Alimi Abdul-Razaq, a lawyer. She is involved in humanitarian and religious activities.
