= Dambanang Kawayan =

Roman Catholic church in Taguig, Philippines

- Saint John the Baptist Parish Church
- Parroquia San Juan el Bautista (Spanish)
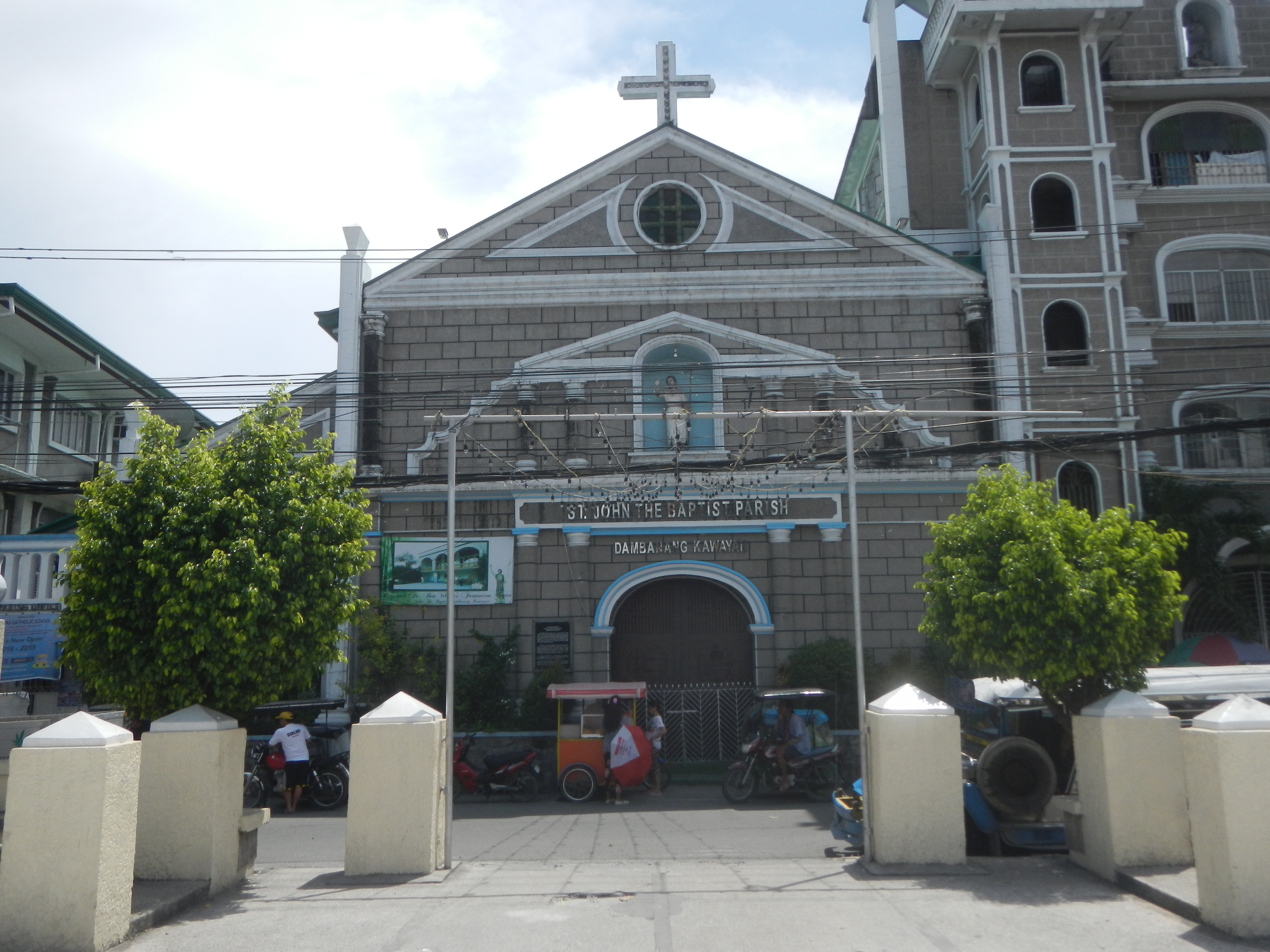
- Church facade in 2018
- Dambanang Kawayan
- 14°32′29″N 121°04′50″E
- Location: Ligid-Tipas, Taguig
- Country: Philippines
- Denomination: Roman Catholic

History
- Founded: November 17, 1969
- Founder: Rev. Fr. Ruben J. Villote
- Dedication: St. John the Baptist

Administration
- Province: Metropolitan Archdiocese of Manila
- Diocese: Pasig

Clergy
- Bishop: Bishop Mylo Hubert Vergara
- Pastor: Rev. Fr. Glenn B. Gaabucayan

Saint John the Baptist Parish Church, commonly known as the Dambanang Kawayan, is a Roman Catholic parish church located in Barangay Ligid-Tipas in Taguig, Philippines. This was established in 1573.

This church of Tipas formerly belonged to the Immaculate Conception Parish of Pasig and later transferred to the Shrine of Saint Anne in Sta. Ana, Taguig City. On November 17, 1969, Cardinal Rufino Jiao Santos formally erected the parish under the patronage of St. John the Baptist. The first parish priest appointed was Rev. Fr. Ruben "Ben" J. Villote. The word "Tipas" comes from the word "Tinagpas" or "Tiga-gapas" because the original taga-Tipas were farmers.

From 1969 to 2003, the Parish of St. John the Baptist was a part of the Archdiocese of Manila. Presently, it belongs to the Vicariate of St. Anne under the Diocese of Pasig; Rev. Fr. Glenn B. Gaabucayan currently serves as the parish priest.

== Land area ==
- Total land area: 3.62 square kilometres (1.40 sq mi)
- Parish lot area: 27,531 square metres (296,340 sq ft)

== Parish priests ==
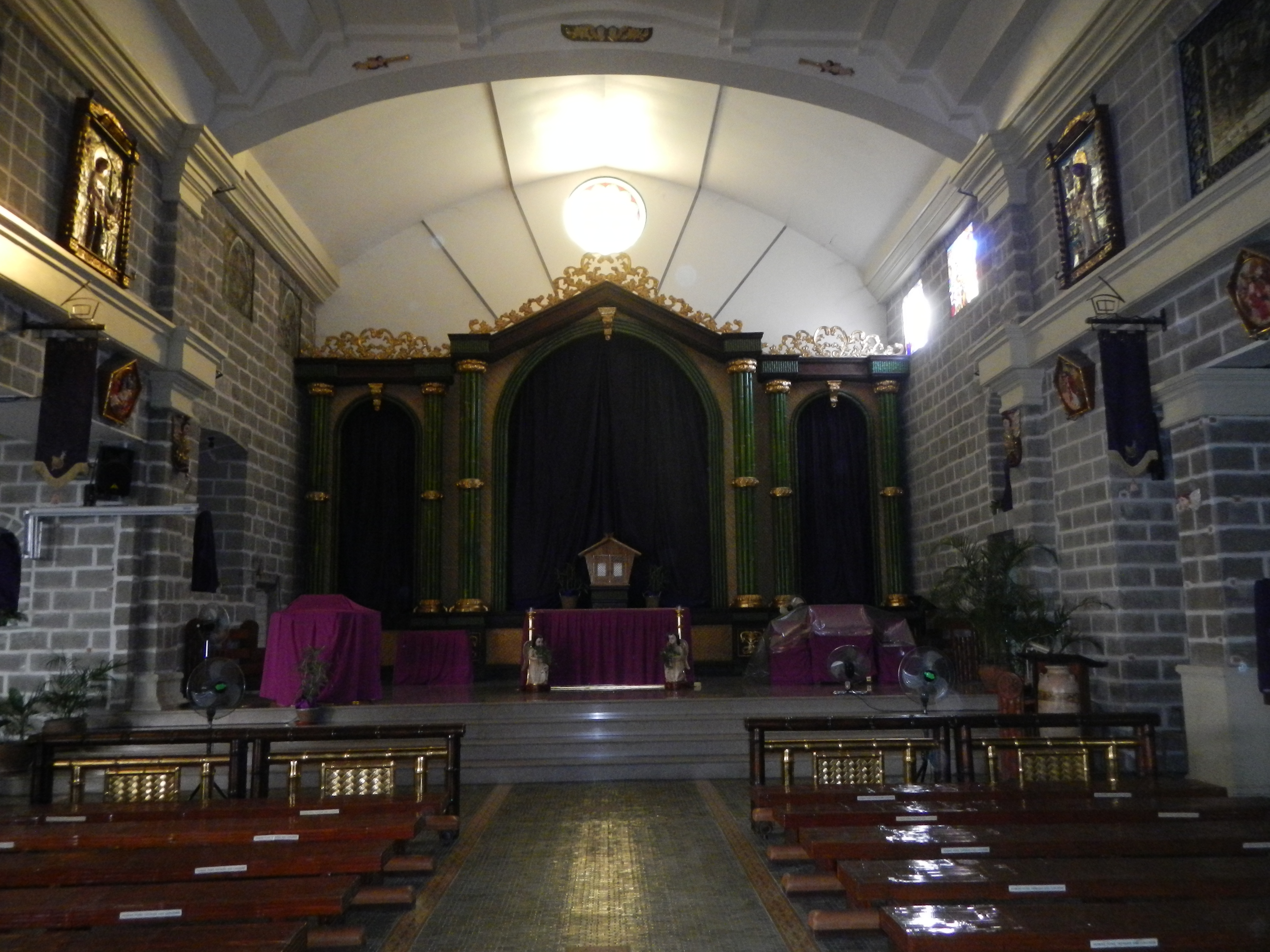
Church interior in 2013

Name	Years of Pastorship	Present Assignment
Rev. Fr. Ruben "Ben" J. Villote	1969 to 1976	deceased (†) Manila North Cemetery
Rev. Fr. Victorio S. Lanuevo	1976 to 1977	Chaplain, Saint Francis Healthcare System of Hawaii
Rev. Fr. Romeo "Romy" M. Castro, SVD	1977 to 1978	SVD Retreat Apostolate
Rev. Fr. Benedicto "Ben" A. Jayoma	1978 to 1983	Retired – Archdiocese of Manila
Rev. Msgr. Alex V. Amandy, HP, JCD	1983 to 1985	St. Gabriel the Archangel Parish (Caloocan)
Rev. Fr. Francisco "Frank" M. Ungria	1985 to 1986	deceased (†) Mt. Zion Memorial Garden, Dagupan City
Rev. Fr. Jose F. Superiaso	1986 to 1989	Archdiocese of Manila
Rev. Fr. Lazaro "Lari" B. Abaco	1989 to 1992	Sto. Niño Parish (Pandacan, Manila)
Rev. Fr. Medardo "Ardie" E. Ong	1992	San Pancracio Parish (La Loma, Grace Park, Caloocan)
Rev. Fr. Estanislao "Stan" A. Soria	1992 to 1995	deceased (†)
Rev. Fr. Roy "Dong" S. Limquiaco	1995 to 1998	leave of absence
Rev. Fr. Leo Nilo S. Mangussad	1998 to 1999	Mary Queen of Peace Shrine (Ortigas, Mandaluyong)
Rev. Fr. Bernardino "Nong" S. Yebra	1999 to 2000	abroad
Rev. Fr. Orlando "Orly" B. Cantillon	2000 to 2005	Director Catholic School, Diocese of Pasig
Rev. Fr. Jorge Jesus A. Bellosillo	2005 to 2009	St. Michael the Archangel Parish, Uptown Bonifacio, Taguig City, Metro Manila
Rev. Fr. Juvi Q. Coronel	2009 to 2015	San Antonio Abad Parish (Maybunga, Pasig City)
Rev. Fr. Apolinario C. Matilos	2015 to 2021	Minor Basilica and Archdiocesan Shrine of St. Anne (Sta. Ana, Taguig City)
Rev. Fr. Glenn B. Gaabucayan	2021 – present	St. John the Baptist Parish Dambana ng Kawayan
