= Ruben J. Villote =

Filipino Roman Catholic priest (1932–2013)

Father Ruben Villote
- Born: Ruben Juco Villote; 19 December 1932; Tondo, Manila, Philippine Islands
- Died: 6 July 2013 (aged 80)
- Resting place: Manila North Cemetery, Manila, Philippines; 14.633°N 120.989°E
- Education: San Jose Major Seminary
- Occupation: Priest
- Years active: 1959–2008
- Known for: Founder, Dambanang Kawayan and Center for Migrant Youth
- Notable work: 12 books
- Awards: AY Foundation's Mother Theresa Award (2007); Aurora Aragon Quezon Peace Award (1993)

Ruben Juco Villote (19 December 1932 – 6 July 2013), sometimes known as "Father Ben", was a Filipino Roman Catholic priest. He was born in Tondo, Manila on 19 December 1932. He studied philosophy and theology at San Jose Major Seminary (1951–1959) and was ordained priest for the Archdiocese of Manila in 1959.

He served as chaplain at Parish of the Holy Sacrifice, University of the Philippines Diliman. He helped build the Dambanang Kawayan (Saint John the Baptist Parish) in Taguig City and served as its pastor from 1969 to 1976. He left to found the Center for Migrant Youth in Quezon City. He authored a dozen books, was a columnist for the Pilipino Star and a regular contributor to the Sunday Inquirer Magazine.

Villote received many awards, including the AY Foundation's Mother Teresa Award in 2007 and the Aurora Aragon Quezon Peace Award in 1993. He joined the new Diocese of Cubao in 2003.

== Death ==
Villote died on 6 July 2013 at the age of 80.
