= José R. Reyes =

Filipino hospital administrator

- Born: José Reyes y Reyes; July 3, 1902; Malolos, Bulacan, Philippine Islands
- Died: January 24, 1964 (aged 61); Manila, Philippines
- Occupations: Physician, Hospital Administrator
- Known for: Longest-serving early director of North General Hospital (now José R. Reyes Memorial Medical Center)

José Reyes y Reyes (July 3, 1902 – January 24, 1964) was a Filipino physician and hospital administrator. He served as the medical director of the North General Hospital in Manila, Philippines, from 1948 until his death in 1964. He is best known as the namesake of the José R. Reyes Memorial Medical Center (JRRMMC), a premier tertiary-level government hospital under the Department of Health in the Philippines.

== Early life ==
José R. Reyes was born on July 3, 1902 to Vicente Reyes y Tatoco and Olympia Reyes, in the town of Malolos, Bulacan. After graduating from Bulacan High School (now Marcelo H. del Pilar National High School) in 1918, he went on to complete his medical degree at the University of the Philippines College of Medicine in 1928. He later pursued a career in medicine, eventually becoming a prominent figure in the Philippine public healthcare sector during the post-war reconstruction era.

== Career ==
=== Directorship of North General Hospital ===
Following the Battle of Liberation in Manila during World War II, the City Children's Hospital was reorganized as an emergency and charity facility known as the North General Hospital (NGH). It was initially managed by National Scientist Fe del Mundo. On March 16, 1948, Dr. José R. Reyes was appointed to succeed del Mundo as the new hospital director of NGH.

Upon his appointment, Reyes faced a rapidly growing population in the northern districts of Manila that relied heavily on the charity hospital for healthcare. Recognizing the urgent need for better facilities, Reyes extensively lobbied various government agencies for financial aid and institutional expansion.

=== Establishment of the San Lazaro Compound ===
Through Reyes's administrative efforts, the Philippine government allotted 200,000 pesos for the establishment of a dedicated hospital for Manila's northern district. He oversaw the selection of the San Lazaro Compound in Santa Cruz, Manila, as the permanent site for the new facility, with construction officially beginning in 1956.

To equip the new hospital, Reyes successfully secured international assistance from the United States government through the International Cooperation Agency (ICA), which provided the necessary funding to acquire modern medical and paramedical equipment. Under his leadership, the newly constructed North General Hospital was completed and formally inaugurated on February 28, 1957. It officially opened its doors for medical service in October of the same year.

== Death and legacy ==
Reyes continued to serve as the medical director of the North General Hospital until his sudden death on January 24, 1964, at the age of 61.

A year after his passing, in recognition of his extensive service and pivotal role in modernizing the institution, the North General Hospital was officially renamed the Dr. José R. Reyes Memorial Hospital on June 19, 1965. The hospital later evolved into a prominent medical training center. In 1982, through Executive Order No. 851 issued by President Ferdinand Marcos, the facility was officially upgraded and renamed the José R. Reyes Memorial Medical Center. Today, JRRMMC remains one of the flagship hospitals of the Philippine Department of Health, standing as a lasting monument to Reyes's legacy in Philippine public healthcare.
