= Maruxa Pita =

Spanish missionary (1930–2025)

- Born: María Dolores Pita Lissarrague; 18 March 1930; Madrid, Spain
- Died: 19 January 2025 (aged 94); Quezon City, Philippines
- Known for: Missionary, teacher, instructor, mentor and school principal
- Awards: The Blessed Teresa of Calcutta Award (2011); People’s Choice Award (2012)

María Dolores "Maruxa" Pita Lissarrague (Spanish pronunciation: [maˈɾuʃa ˈpita]; 18 March 1930 – 19 January 2025) was a Spanish missionary and teacher who lived most of her life in the Philippines. She is best known for helping to establish the Institución Teresiana, now known as Saint Pedro Poveda College in Quezon City.

== Early life ==
Maruxa Pita was born in Madrid on 18 March 1930, but she was very related with the galician city of Betanzos, despite familiar origins. Her father's name was Antonino Pita and her 3 sisters: Carmen, Chita and Isabel. At the age of 17 she followed her older sister Chita and joined the Teresian Association that was founded by Father Pedro Poveda.

== In the Philippines ==
Pita arrived in the Philippines in 1959 to help establish the Institución Teresiana, now known as Saint Pedro Poveda College in Quezon City. She served as school principal from 1965 to 1973. In its early years the Institución Teresiana pre-school was co-ed, and she taught the four children of former Senator Ninoy Aquino and former President Corazon Aquino, including the future President Benigno Aquino III.

She then taught Spanish at both the University of Santo Tomas from 1973 to 1979 and the Spanish Cultural Center from 1975 to 1979. She also worked as director of the Spanish Cultural Center where she organized all the teaching areas and managed the Spanish teachers from 1979 to 1993. In 1993, the Instituto Cervantes of Manila was established, replacing the Spanish Cultural Center, and she was appointed academic head of the center. It was the first center of the Instituto Cervantes established in Asia. In 1995, she established the Makabata School Foundation in Pasig to help less fortunate Filipino children to study for free. For her efforts, the Instituto Cervantes gave a tribute to her in honor of her work in promoting the Spanish language in the Philippines and her dedication and commitment to help educate underprivileged children with her foundation.

Pita died at St. Luke's Medical Center in Quezon City, on 19 January 2025, at the age of 94.

== Awards and recognition ==
- The Blessed Teresa of Calcutta Award (2011)
- People’s Choice Award (2012)
