= Fe del Mundo =

Filipino pediatrician (1911–2011)

Fe del Mundo OLD ONS GCGH
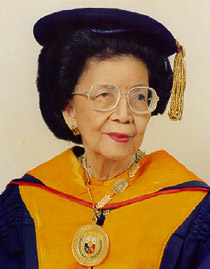
- Born: Fé Primitiva del Mundo y Villanueva; November 27, 1911; Manila, Philippine Islands
- Died: August 6, 2011 (aged 99); Quezon City, Philippines
- Education: University of the Philippines Manila; Boston University
- Occupation: Pediatrician
- Awards: Order of National Scientists of the Philippines (1980)

Fe Villanueva del Mundo OLD, ONS, GCGH (born Fé Primitiva del Mundo y Villanueva; November 27, 1911 – August 6, 2011) was a Filipino pediatrician. She founded the first pediatric hospital in the Philippines and helped shape the country's modern child healthcare system. Her pioneering work in pediatrics in the Philippines spanned eight decades.

She gained international recognition, including the Ramon Magsaysay Award for Public Service in 1977. In 1980, she was conferred the rank and title of National Scientist of the Philippines, and in 2010, she received the Order of Lakandula. She was the first female president of the Philippine Pediatric Society and the first woman to be named National Scientist of the Philippines. She was also the first Asian to be elected president of the Philippine Medical Association in its 65-year history, and the first Asian to be voted president of the Medical Women's International Association.

== Early life and education ==
Del Mundo was born at 120 Cabildo Street in the district of Intramuros, Manila, on November 27, 1911. She was one of eight children of Bernardo del Mundo and Paz (née Villanueva; d. 1925). Her family home was opposite the Manila Cathedral. Bernardo was a prominent lawyer from Marinduque who served one term in the Philippine Assembly representing the province of Tayabas. Three of her seven siblings died in infancy, while an older sister died from appendicitis at age 11. The death of her younger sister Elisa, who had made known her desire to become a doctor for the poor, inspired del Mundo to choose a career in medicine.

In 1926 at age 15, del Mundo enrolled at the University of the Philippines Manila and received her Associate of Arts two years later. She then went to the UP College of Medicine, at the original campus of the University of the Philippines in Manila. She earned her medical degree in 1933, graduating as class valedictorian. She passed the medical board exam that same year, placing third among the examinees. Her exposure while in medical school to various health conditions afflicting children in the provinces, particularly in Marinduque, led her to choose pediatrics as her specialization.

=== Postgraduate studies ===
After del Mundo graduated from UPM, President Manuel Quezon offered to pay for her further training, in a medical field of her choice, at any school in the United States. Del Mundo has sometimes been said to have been Harvard Medical School's first woman student, the first woman enrolled in pediatrics at the school, its first Asian student, the first Asian woman admitted to Harvard, or even "said to have been admitted to Harvard Medical school by mistake." However, according to an archivist at Harvard's Center for the History of Medicine,

While Dr. Del Mundo was remarkable in many ways, the evidence that she was a medical student at Harvard Medical School is largely anecdotal and not well sourced. As far as my research using Harvard Medical School catalogs and records shows, she earned her Medical Degree from the University of the Philippines Manila in 1933, and in 1936, came to Boston to further her studies in pediatrics. The fact that Harvard Medical School did not admit women students and Dr. Del Mundo already earned her medical degree suggests that she was not admitted as a student, even in error, and I cannot find proof that she graduated from Harvard Medical School ... Instead, it seems more likely that she completed graduate work at Harvard Medical School through an appointment at Boston Children's Hospital ... del Mundo is listed as an Assistant Physician at Boston Children's Hospital, and a Research Fellow in Pediatrics in 1940. Further suggesting that she was a graduate student and not a medical student, in her autobiographical statement in Women Physicians of the World (1977), Dr. Del Mundo explains "I spent three years of my postgraduate studies at the Children's Hospital in Boston and at Harvard Medical School, one year at the University of Chicago, six months at Johns Hopkins Hospital, and short terms in various pediatric institutions, all to round out my training."

Harvard had had thousands of Asian students by the time Del Mundo arrived there. Del Mundo returned to Harvard Medical School's Children's Hospital in 1939 for a two-year research fellowship. She also enrolled at the Boston University School of Medicine, earning a Master's degree in bacteriology in 1940.

== Medical practice ==
Del Mundo returned to the Philippines in 1941, shortly before the Japanese invasion of the country. She joined the International Red Cross and volunteered to care for child-internees then detained at the University of Santo Tomas internment camp for foreign nationals. She set up a makeshift hospice within the internment camp, and her activities led her to be known as "The Angel of Santo Tomas". After the Japanese authorities shut down the hospice in 1943, del Mundo was asked by Manila mayor León Guinto to head a children's hospital under the auspices of the city government. The hospital was later converted into a full-care medical center to cope with the mounting casualties during the Battle of Manila, and would be renamed the North General Hospital (later, the Jose R. Reyes Memorial Medical Center). Del Mundo would remain the hospital's director until 1948.

Del Mundo joined the faculty of the University of Santo Tomas, then the Far Eastern University in 1954. She became the head of the Department of Pediatrics at Far Eastern University - Nicanor Reyes Medical Foundation for more than two decades. In the 1950s, she established a small medical pediatric clinic to pursue a private practice. Del Mundo founded the Children's Medical Center Foundation in 1957. In 1996, she established the Institute of Maternal and Child Health, an institution that trains doctors and nurses.

=== Establishment of the Children's Medical Center ===
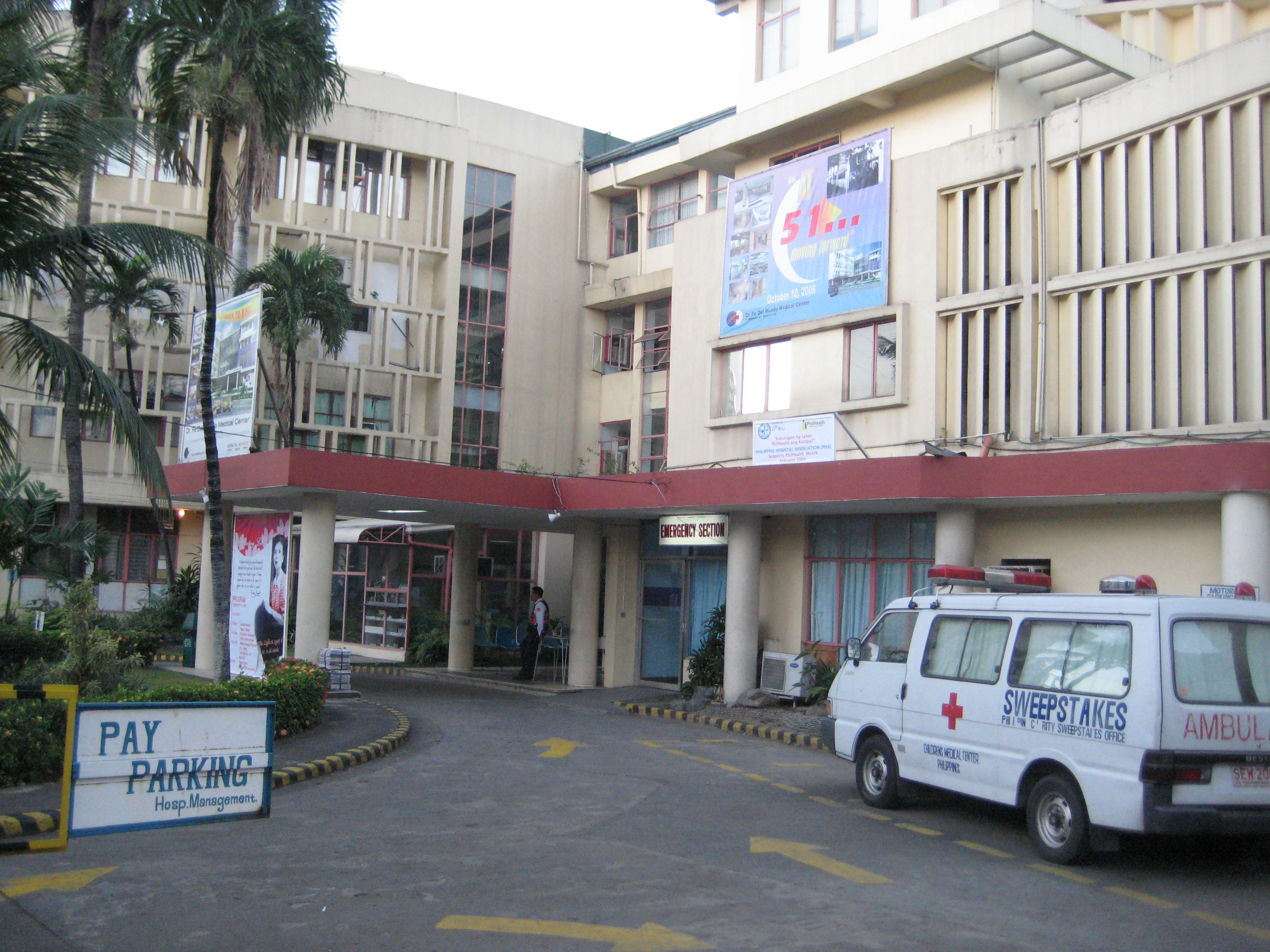
The Children's Medical Center of the Philippines, established in 1957.

Frustrated by the bureaucratic constraints in working for a government hospital, del Mundo desired to establish her own pediatric hospital. Towards that end, she sold her home and most of her personal effects, and obtained a sizable loan from the GSIS (the Government Service Insurance System) to finance the construction of her own hospital. The Children's Medical Center, a 107-bed hospital located in Quezon City, was inaugurated in 1957 as the first pediatric hospital in the Philippines. The hospital was expanded in 1966 through the establishment of an Institute of Maternal and Child Health, the first institution of its kind in Asia.

In 1958, del Mundo conveyed her personal ownership of the hospital to a board of trustees.

Dr. Fe del Mundo lived on the second floor of the Children's Medical Center in Quezon City and continued making early morning rounds until she was 99 years old.

=== Establishment of the Children's Medical Center Foundation ===
When she founded the Children's Medical Center Foundation in 1957, she was able to bring medical care to Filipinos in the rural areas of the Philippines who had little to no access to health care. This foundation saved thousands of children by establishing family planning clinics and treating preventable health issues such as poor nutrition and dehydration.

== Later life and death ==
Del Mundo was still active in her practice of pediatrics into her 90s. She died of cardiac arrest on August 6, 2011, three months before her 100th birthday, and was buried at the Libingan ng mga Bayani.

== Research and innovations ==
Del Mundo was noted for her pioneering work on infectious diseases in Philippine communities. Undeterred by the lack of well-equipped laboratories in post-war Philippines, she unhesitatingly sent specimens or blood samples for analysis abroad. In the 1950s, she pursued studies on dengue fever, a common malady in the Philippines, of which little was known at the time. Her clinical observations on dengue, and the findings of research she later undertook on the disease are said to "have led to a fuller understanding of dengue fever as it afflicts the young". She authored over a hundred articles, reviews, and reports in medical journals on such diseases as dengue, polio and measles. She also authored Textbook of Pediatrics, a fundamental medical text used in Philippine medical schools.

Del Mundo was active in the field of public health, with special concerns towards rural communities. She organized rural extension teams to advise mothers on breastfeeding and child care. and promoted the idea of linking hospitals to the community through the public immersion of physicians and other medical personnel to allow for greater coordination among health workers and the public for common health programs such as immunization and nutrition. She called for the greater integration of midwives into the medical community, considering their more visible presence within rural communities. Notwithstanding her own devout Catholicism, she was an advocate of family planning and population control.

Del Mundo was also known for having devised an incubator made out of bamboo, designed for use in rural communities without electrical power.

== Awards and recognition ==
In 1980, del Mundo was declared as a National Scientist of the Philippines, the first Filipino woman to be so named.

Among the international honors bestowed on del Mundo was the Elizabeth Blackwell Award for Outstanding Service to Mankind, handed in 1966 by Hobart and William Smith Colleges, and the citation as Outstanding Pediatrician and Humanitarian by the International Pediatric Association in 1977. Also in 1977, del Mundo was awarded the Ramon Magsaysay Award for Public Service.

Dr. Fe del Mundo was an honorary member of the American Pediatric Society and an advisory board member of the World Health Organization's International Pedatric Association.

In 2008, she received the Blessed Teresa of Calcutta Award of the AY Foundation.

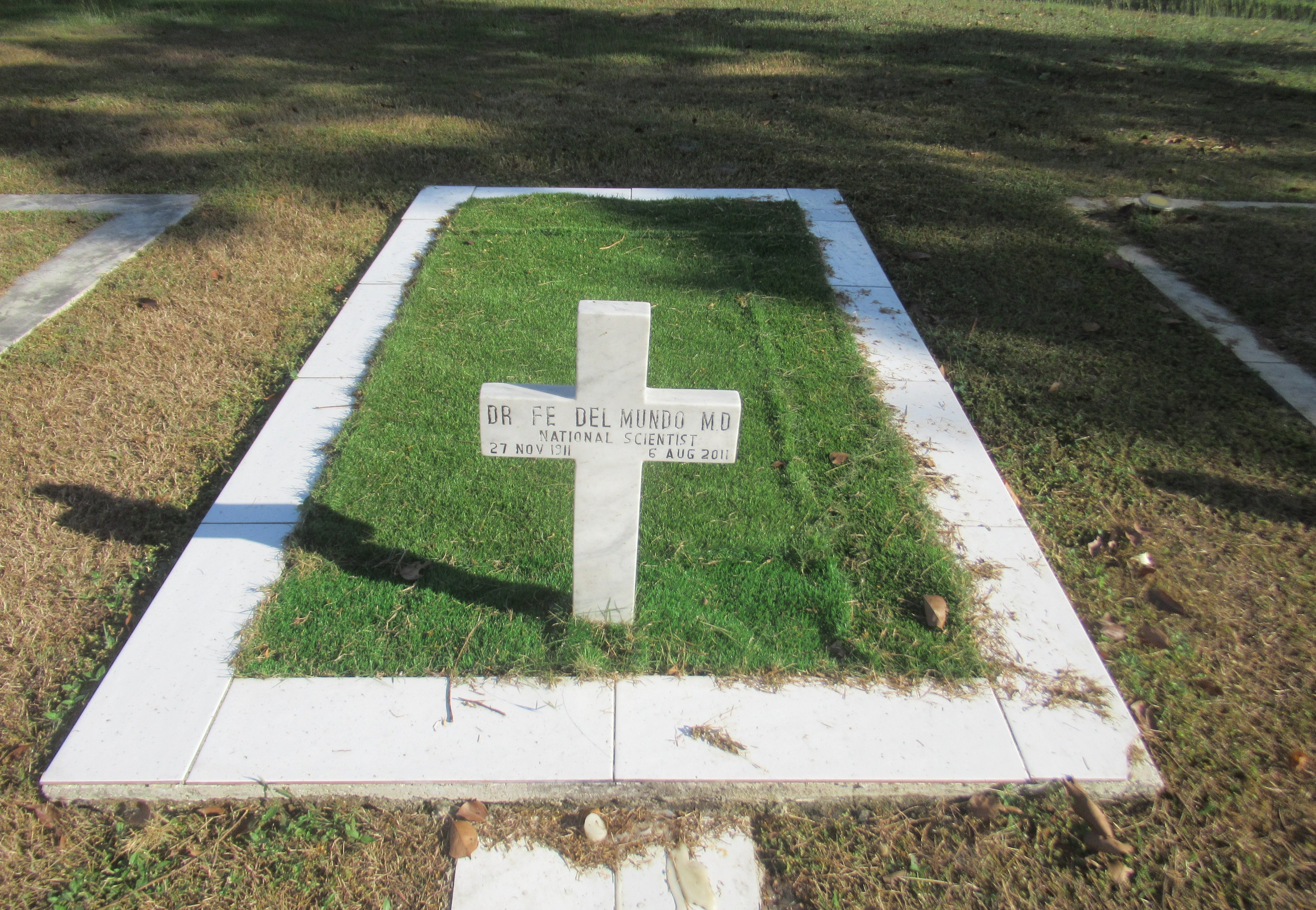
del Mundo's grave at the Libingan ng mga Bayani.

On April 22, 2010, President Gloria Macapagal-Arroyo awarded del Mundo the Order of Lakandula with the rank of Bayani at the Malacañan Palace.

Posthumously, she was conferred the Grand Collar of the Order of the Golden Heart Award by President Benigno Aquino III in 2011.

On November 27, 2018, a Google Doodle was displayed to celebrate del Mundo's 107th birthday.

== Selected publications ==
=== Articles ===
- Del Mundo, Fe (April 1962). "A Survey of Hospital-Born Prematures in the Philippines". Obstetrical & Gynecological Survey. 17 (2). Philadelphia, PA: Lippincott Williams & Wilkins: 225–227. doi:10.1097/00006254-196204000-00019. ISSN 0029-7828. OCLC 818904997.
- Del Mundo, F.; Adiao, A. C. (1970). "Lactation and child spacing as observed among 2,102 rural Filipino mothers". The Philippine Journal of Pediatrics. 19 (3): 128–132. ISSN 0031-7667. PMID 12305373.
- Del Mundo, Fe; Soriano, Lolita (1979). "Clinical Observations on Dengue Hemorrhagic Fever (DHF) in Metro Manila (1977-1979)" (PDF). Transactions of the National Academy of Science and Technology Transactions of the National Academy of Science and Technology. 1. Manila, Philippines: National Academy of Science and Technology: 22–34. ISSN 0115-8848. OCLC 655377546.
- Del Mundo, Fe (1982). "Linking Hospitals with the Community and Medical Reorientation Relevant to Primary Health Care in the Philippines" (PDF). Transactions of the National Academy of Science and Technology Transactions of the National Academy of Science and Technology. 4. Manila, Philippines: National Academy of Science and Technology: 163–178. ISSN 0115-8848. OCLC 655377546.
- Del Mundo, Fe; Cruz, Ana Maria; Kleiner, Hilda Lin; Sales, Dory (1984). "Bacteria Identified in Diarrheal Stools of Early Childhood and Sensitivity Tests, Metro Maninla (1980–1982)" (PDF). Transactions of the National Academy of Science and Technology Transactions of the National Academy of Science and Technology. 6. Manila, Philippines: National Academy of Science and Technology: 249–265. ISSN 0115-8848. OCLC 655377546.
- Del Mundo, Fe; Fonte, Ana Luz May V.; Cruz, Carina (1986). "Low Birth Weight Neonates and Surrounding Factors: A Situation Study in Communities of 11 Health Regions of the Philippines (1983–85)" (PDF). Transactions of the National Academy of Science and Technology Transactions of the National Academy of Science and Technology. 8. Manila, Philippines: National Academy of Science and Technology: 159–173. ISSN 0115-8848. OCLC 655377546.
- Del Mundo, Fe; Santos, Jaime; Santos, Cynthia (1985). "Pseudomonas Infections in Hospitalized Infants and Children, Metro Manila 1984" (PDF). Transactions of the National Academy of Science and Technology Transactions of the National Academy of Science and Technology. 7. Manila, Philippines: National Academy of Science and Technology: 143–152. ISSN 0115-8848. OCLC 655377546.
- Del Mundo, Fe; Evangelista, Thaddeus; Arciaga, Mario (1987). "Trends in the Health and Nutrition of Filipino Children (0-19 Years) in the Decade 1973 to 1983" (PDF). Transactions of the National Academy of Science and Technology Transactions of the National Academy of Science and Technology. 9. Manila, Philippines: National Academy of Science and Technology: 461–494. ISSN 0115-8848. OCLC 655377546.
- Del Mundo, Fe; Bernardino, Sylvia C. (1988). "Clinical Observations on the First Varicella Vaccinees in the Philippines with Live Attenuated Oka Strain Vaccine (1987)" (PDF). Transactions of the National Academy of Science and Technology Transactions of the National Academy of Science and Technology. 10. Manila, Philippines: National Academy of Science and Technology: 437–446. ISSN 0115-8848. OCLC 655377546.

=== Books ===
- Del Mundo, Fe (2000) [1976]. Textbook of Pediatrics and Child Health (3rd ed.). Quezon City: JMC Press. ISBN 978-971-11-1086-4. OCLC 989457930.
- Del Mundo, Fe; Estrada, Felix A.; Nutrition Center of the Philippines (1985). A Manual on Infant Nutrition with Emphasis on Breastfeeding for Philippine Medical Colleges. Metro Manila: Nutrition Center of the Philippines. OCLC 398000401.
- del Mundo, Fe (1986). Selected papers of Fe del Mundo. Manila: National Academy of Science and Technology. ISBN 978-971-8538-02-9. OCLC 32952404.

=== Chapters ===
- Del Mundo, Fe (1974). "Problems and Findings from the TBA Program in the Philippines". In Peng, J. Y.; MacIntyre, Reginald; Keovichit, Srisomang (eds.). Role of Traditional Birth Attendants in Family Planning: Proceedings of an international seminar held in Bangkok and Kuala Lumpur, 19-26 July 1974. Ottawa, Canada: International Development Research Center. ISBN 978-0-88936-045-7. OCLC 38268371.
- Del Mundo, Fe (1980). "Pitfalls in the Promotion of Breastfeeding". In Valyasevi, Aree; Baker, Jean (eds.). Proceedings of the Workshop on Breastfeeding and Supplementary Foods (PDF). Bangkok: United Production Press. pp. 20–22. OCLC 495289459. Archived from the original (PDF) on February 21, 2017.
- Dionisio-Garcia, F.; Del Mundo, F.; Bondoc-dela Cruz, V. (1983). "Use of Mothers for some Aspects of Primary Health Care in Philippine Barangays (Villages)". In del Mundo, Fe; Ines-Cuyegkeng, Elena; Aviado, Domingo M. (eds.). Primary Maternal and Neonatal Health: A Global Concern. Boston, MA: Springer US. doi:10.1007/978-1-4613-3608-2_43. ISBN 978-1-4613-3610-5. OCLC 7322295444.

=== Thesis ===
- Hospital infections and the effects of ultraviolet radiation (PDF) (MS thesis). Boston University. 1940. doi:10.15530/urtec-2017-2670073. hdl:2144/4142. OCLC 7941617.
