= Ola Opesan =

Nigerian-British writer, journalist and educationist

- Born: 1966 (age 59–60); London
- Citizenship: Nigeria
- Education: University of Ife
- Occupation: Journalist

Ola Opesan (born 1966) is a Nigerian-British writer, journalist and educationist. He published his first novel, Another Lonely Londoner (1991), under the pseudonym Gbenga Agbenugba.

== Life ==
Ola Opesan was born in London to Nigerian parents in 1966. He returned with his family to Nigeria when he was ten years old, going to school there, and attending the University of Ife. He returned to London to study scriptwriting, completing a TV and video course, and writing several screenplays.

While in London Opesan read Sam Selvon's novel The Lonely Londoners, and in response wrote his own novel, Another Lonely Londoner. Written in a mix of English and Nigerian pidgin, the novel deals with the experience of young Nigerians in London. Alienated as an immigrant by his encounter with British racism, the novel's protagonist Akin eventually decides to return to Nigeria:

He had spent the greater part of his life in London, and he had come to realise that though the colour of him passport blue, the colour of him skin tell him, he had no choice about where was home.

In 1996-7 Opesan was editor of the Nigerian lifestyle magazine Ovation. In 1997 he published his second novel, Many Rivers to Cross, under his own name. In 1999 he became the editor of another lifestyle magazine, Omega. He also contributed an essay on African businesses in the UK to the 2000 Penguin anthology IC3.

Opesan gained a BA in Business Studies from the University of East London and a MA in Mass Communications from the University of Leicester before training as a secondary school maths teacher. He became head of mathematics and later assistant head teacher at George Mitchell School in Leyton. In 2007 he moved to Lagos as the founding Principal of Meadow Hall School, Lekki, Lagos. There he has also authored an introductory book about Nigerian history, Nigeria in 101 Headlines.

== Works ==
=== As Gbenga Agbenugba ===
- Another Lonely Londoner. London: Ronu Books, 1991.

=== As Ola Opesan ===
- Many Rivers to Cross. London: X Press, 1996. ISBN 9781874509400
- 'The proliferation of African businesses in the UK: will Africans be the new Asians of UK business', in Courttia Newland & Kadija Sesay, eds., IC3: the Penguin Book of New Black Writing in Britain, London: Penguin, 2000, pp. 197–206.
- Lyricism: journey to the centre of the mind. London: Ronu Books, 2013.
- Nigeria in 101 headlines: the past, a lamp to the future. London: Ronu Books, 2015. Illustrated by Tosin Kajopelaye-Ola and Pere Frey.
