= Medical foundation =

Foundation which supports the field of medicine

Medical foundations are nonprofit legal entities to allow physicians or certain other health care providers a mechanism to perform research or provide medical services. Medical foundations provide more flexibility for physicians and other providers. Foundations are often set up for charitable purposes, as a memorial or collective medical activity. Usually, they are organized as non-stock corporations and are eligible for federal tax exempt status.

== Core principles ==
Medical foundations are independent organizations of scientists, physicians and support personnel to investigate key medical challenges and emerging health needs. They provide more flexibility than traditional clinics and hospitals, but more stability than many university-based research organizations. Most focus on stated research priorities and governed by a board of medical and scientific experts. Foundations often have the flexibility to transcend local barriers and collaborate internationally.

== Types of foundations ==
While all medical foundations are non-profits focused on making advances in medical knowledge, there are various types of foundations that provide funding, research, or clinical trials.

=== Funding foundations ===
Some medical foundations exist to fund focus donations from private and corporate funds into strategic research efforts. Examples include the Medical Research Foundation in London and Doris Duke Charitable Foundation.

=== Research foundations ===
A research foundation is focused on making laboratory breakthroughs that have a tangible impact on human health. They push the boundaries of biomedical science by performing basic and applied research into the causes of diseases and novel treatment therapies.

=== Clinical foundations ===
Clinical research foundations provide independent treatment centers with emerging treatments and drugs. Clinical foundations tend to be associated with a medical facility or medical university, which provides patients for whom traditional therapies have not been effective. These include the Duke ALS clinic.

Some provide social psychological therapies, such as the Freedom from Torture foundation in the UK, which provides treatment for victims of torture.
