= Non-stock corporation =

Type of business entity

A non-stock corporation (or nonstock corporation) is a corporation whose owners are not represented by shares of stock, in contrast to a joint-stock company. A non-stock corporation typically has members who are the functional equivalent of shareholders in a stock corporation. Members may have the right to vote (and other rights) under the corporation's bylaws. Non-stock corporations may not have any members.

The vast majority of not-for-profit corporations are non-stock corporations. (Some states, such as Kansas, allow nonprofits to issue stock.) In many jurisdictions, a nonstock corporation can elect to become a stock corporation if it meets certain conditions.

== Jurisdictions ==
=== United States ===
In the United States, law in Pennsylvania and Virginia supports the formation and existence of non-stock corporations, as well as other states.

==== Delaware ====
In Delaware, nonstock corporations are provisioned for by its General Corporation Law. According to DGCL, Delaware permits directors to serve as the only members.

==== Kansas ====
In Kansas, some provisions of the Kansas general corporation code also apply to nonstock corporations, where a nonstock corporation is defined as a "corporation organized under the Kansas general corporation code that is not authorized to issue capital stock."

==== Maryland ====
According to the Maryland Code, the provisions of Maryland General Corporation Law apply to nonstock corporations except in special circumstances.

==== Pennsylvania ====
Title 15, Chapter 21 of the Consolidated States of Pennsylvania provides the laws regarding Pennsylvania nonstock corporations. Existing stock corporations can elect to become nonstock corporations.

=== Philippines ===
In the Philippines, a non-stock corporation may be formed or organized for charitable, religious, educational, professional, cultural, fraternal, literary, scientific, social, civic service, or similar purposes and must distribute no part of its income as dividends to its members, trustees, or officers, and any profit obtained as an incident to its operations shall, whenever necessary or proper, be used for the furtherance of the purpose or purposes for which the corporation was organized.

=== India ===
In India, companies incorporated under Section 8 of the Companies Act, 2013, are non-stock corporations.

== Types ==
=== For profit ===
There are different reasons for forming a non-stock, for profit corporation.

- A corporation created solely to act as nominal owner of some property might not need to have shares of stock because all of the directors or members would have been co-owners. For example, owning a safe deposit box in a corporate name: if the corporation is non-stock, the directors of the corporation are not its owners, and thus have no personal ownership of shares of stock of the corporation, and as the safe deposit box is in a corporate name, it is not listed as belonging to the directors either.
- By not filing as a non-profit, it is not necessary to obtain IRS registration and fees. For corporations being operated for short-term purposes, this may be adequate.
- While members of a non-stock corporation are not entitled to dividends, if it is a for-profit corporation, they are entitled to share in the proceeds in the event the corporation is liquidated; this is not available if the corporation is non-profit; if a non-profit is liquidated, all the proceeds must either be donated to another surviving non-profit or escheated to the government.
- In the event of a for-profit corporation being formed for a single business purpose such as a one-shot transaction, i.e. construction of an apartment building, at the end of the transaction (when the apartments are sold) the corporation can be "wound up and dissolved" (liquidated) and the profits paid to the members or directors without deduction. But if it is a stock corporation, it may be necessary to pay taxes on the profits, then pay the benefits as dividends, which are taxable to the recipients. (This problem is often referred to as "double taxation.") A payback of the assets of a corporation would generally be tax-free until all of the original capital invested in the corporation were returned. Thus use of a for profit non-stock could be used to legally avoid certain taxes.
- While stock in a corporation is considered an asset and reportable (and could be seized in the case of a lawsuit or a government confiscation or nationalization), being a member of a corporation or a director is not an asset and thus is not subject to seizure or reporting for asset purposes. Thus it may be used to hide or obscure assets without doing anything illegal.
- Someone is incorporating a business for liability protection, but is not really interested initially in being able to sell the business. A company can always switch from stock to non-stock and vice versa at any time, usually by paying a small fee to change the articles of incorporation, and potentially a stock fee if the corporation changes from non-stock to stock. (Changing from non-profit to for-profit is generally not allowed absent special permission.) Generally the renewal fees on a non-stock corporation can be substantially less than a stock corporation. For example, the fee for incorporating any non-stock or incorporating a stock corporation up to a small number of shares, say 40,000 might be $200, but a year later, at renewal, the renewal fee for a non-stock corporation would be $50, while the stock corporation would have a renewal fee of $50 plus a stock fee of perhaps another $200 or so.
- Some jurisdictions impose a fee for an annual report filed by stock corporations (Maryland, for example, charges $300 a year), and in some states impose this fee on LLCs, but do not impose this fee on non-stock corporations. Generally, most for-profit companies are stock corporations; this thus allows charities and churches to incorporate without paying this fee, as a non-profit is always a non-stock corporation. Note this fee is in addition to the fee charged for the yearly renewal of the corporation's charter.

In many jurisdictions the yearly renewal fees imposed on corporations can be higher than the initial filing fee.
