= University Foundation Programme =

The University Foundation Programme (UFP) is a one-year intensive course that leads to entry to a wide range of universities in the United Kingdom. It is designed as an alternative to the conventional A-Level route, which takes two years to complete.

== Course structure ==
The UFP was conceived as an alternative to A-Level courses for international students wishing to gain entry into British universities. Although the structure of A-Levels has been changed in recent years to adopt a more holistic, coursework-based approach, the University Foundation Programme offers still less emphasis on end-of-year exam performance and as such is considered more manageable for students whose first language is not English.

The course runs for 32 weeks and is divided into three Phases. Phase I and II are each 12 weeks long, and Phase III is eight weeks long. Students study six modules in total, spread over the duration of the course to provide an even workload. Three of these are core Minor modules (English, mathematics, and information technology) while the remaining three are Major modules, relevant to the student's future degree programme. The Major Academic modules will vary from one course provider to another, but students can expect to study modules in any of the following areas: accounting, sociology, psychology, economics, law, further mathematics, physics, business studies, etc.

The course is assessed on the basis of credit points, and has been carefully designed so that Minor and Major modules each carry a number of points for both coursework and examinations in each of the three Phases of the University Foundation Programme.

The overall allocation of points for the course is divided on a ratio of 40:60, for coursework and examinations respectively. However, the allocation varies for individual modules and Phases depending on the nature of the subject and most suitable method of assessment. Students who maintain a steady workload throughout each of the three Phases of the University Foundation Programme and who acknowledge the importance of both coursework and examinations will therefore benefit; as such, the course is considered more aligned to study and testing habits on most modern university degree courses.

The course runs for up to one academic year. A student starting the course in September of a given year will usually be able to start university in October the following year. Some institutions offer a faster-track course; students on these programmes enrol in January, graduate in August and commence university in October. Such fast-track courses are referred to as advanced or intensive programmes which are much more demanding in terms of work load.

Some providers of the University Foundation course or Programme will have different entry points throughout the year, offering students greater flexibility. The total duration of such courses will still add up to 9 months of full-time study.

== Where the course leads ==
Students graduating from the University Foundation Programme are eligible for entry into many British universities. They are not eligible for entry into Oxford or Cambridge, as these institutions usually receive excessive numbers of applicants through the conventional A-Level route.
