= José R. Reyes Memorial Medical Center =

Government hospital in Manila, Philippines

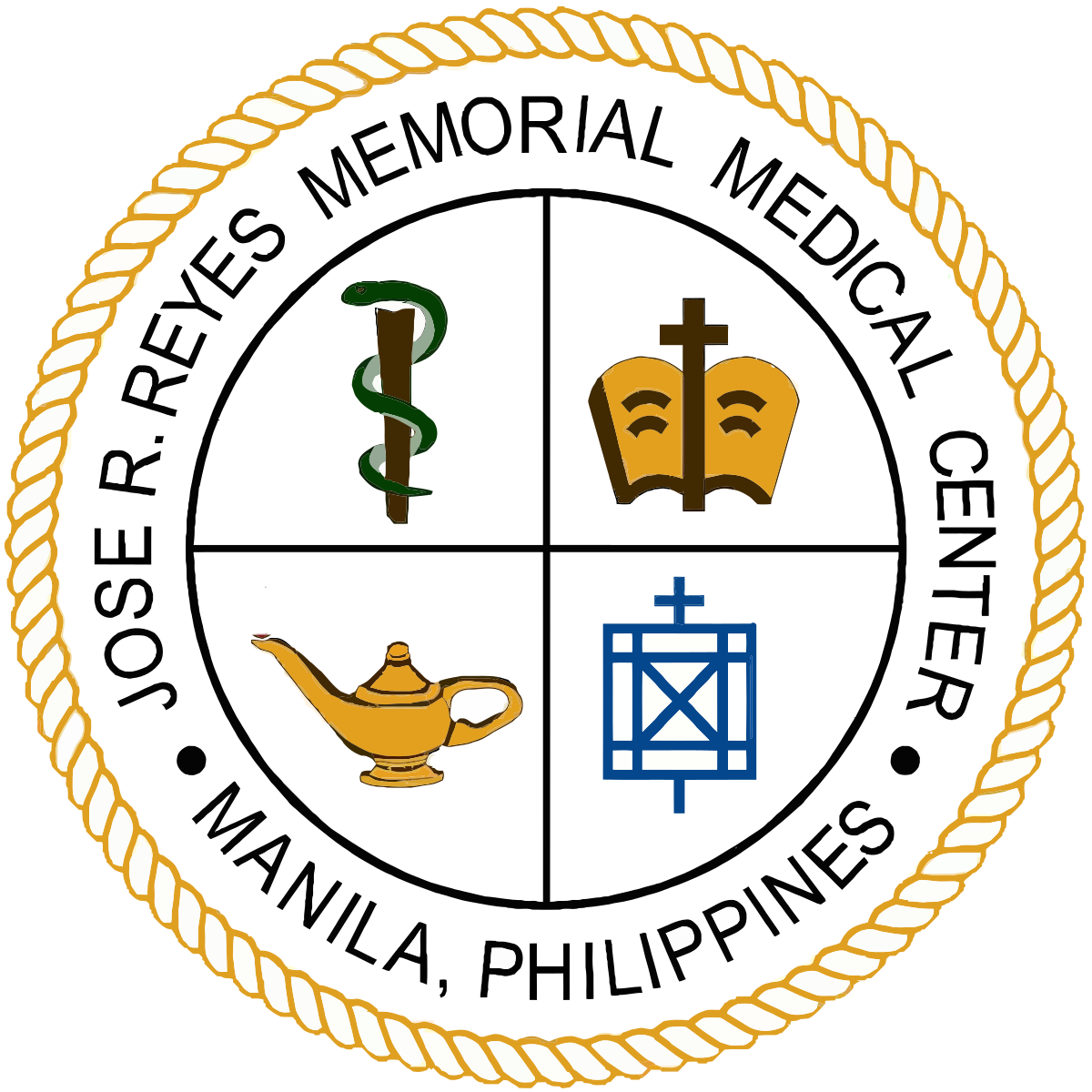

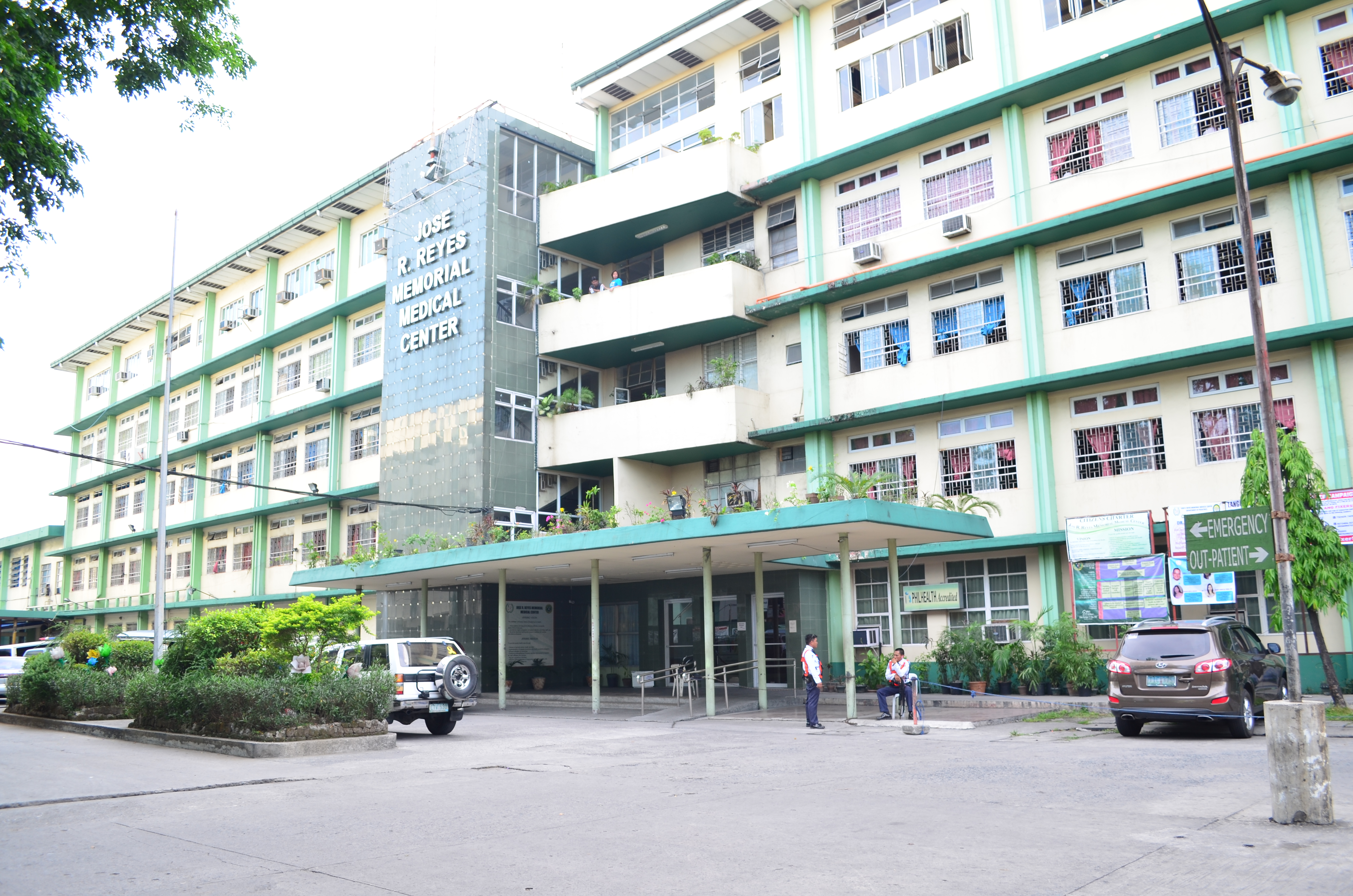
- Facade of the Hospital

- Location within Metro Manila Location within Luzon Location within Philippines

Geography
- Location: San Lazaro Compound, Rizal Avenue, Santa Cruz, Manila, Philippines
- Coordinates: 14°36′50″N 120°58′56″E

Organization
- Type: Government, Charity

History
- Former names: North General Hospital; Jose R. Reyes Memorial Hospital
- Founded: August 1, 1945; 81 years ago (World War 2)

Links
- Website: jrrmmc.gov.ph

José R. Reyes Memorial Medical Center's operations started in 1945 in Manila, Philippines as a 450-bed facility known as City Children's Hospital, housed in a borrowed school building and was managed by Fe del Mundo. It was transformed into an emergency hospital to give care to the wounded during the Battle of Liberation in Manila.

== History ==
On August 1, 1945, the hospital was turned over to the Department of Health (Philippines) after the war. It was renamed North General Hospital (NGH) because it was located in Manila, north of the Pasig River, and it became a charity hospital, still under the leadership of Fe del Mundo, serving the needs of approximately two-thirds of more than a million population of the northern half of the city of Manila.

A School of Nursing was opened on September 1, 1945, to fill in the need for trained nurses in the hospital as well as improve the nursing education in the country. On March 16, 1948, Jose Reyes was appointed as the new hospital director. He appealed to government agencies for aid. Two-hundred thousand pesos was allotted for the establishment of a hospital north district of Manila. San Lazaro Compound was chosen for its site and construction started in 1956. The government of the United States of America through the International Cooperation Agency (ICA) provided aid for the acquisition of medical and paramedical equipment. The new North General Hospital was completed and formally inaugurated on February 28, 1957, and it opened for service in October 1957.

On June 19, 1965, the North General Hospital was renamed Dr. Jose R. Reyes Memorial Hospital in honor of Jose Reyes y Reyes for his service as the Director of the hospital from March 16, 1948, up to his death in 1964. At present, it is known as Jose R. Reyes Memorial Medical Center by virtue of Executive Order No. 851 s.1982. It is not only a general tertiary level hospital but also a medical training center under the Department of Health (Philippines).

Artemio Cabrera was appointed Medical Center Chief from 1969 to 1986. During his term, new facilities and services were established such as the Microbiology Unit, Nuclear Medicine, Family Planning, ICCU, Medicare Wing and Urology ward. In his effort, the hospital offered training and research service, thus converting it to a Medical Center in 1982 by the power of Executive Order 851.

In 1986, Antonio Periquet was appointed as medical director. Two agencies from the Ministry of Health were reorganized and integrated to the hospital, such as the National Cancer Control Center and Dermatology & Research Center by the power of Executive Order 119.

During Primo V. Brillantes Jr.'s term as medical director from 1988 to 1996, Jose R. Reyes Memorial Medical Center became the flagship hospital of the Department of Health (Philippines). Center of Wellness Hospital Programs was introduced and the hospital was accredited as "Mother-Baby Friendly Hospital." Moreover, the hospital had undergone expansion and renovation of its facilities.

Alicia M. Lim was appointed as the next Medical Center Chief II from 1997 to 2011. After her retirement, Emmanuel F. Montaña Jr. succeeded her and remained as the present Medical Center Chief. In 2012, the Pediatric Ward of the hospital was renovated through the help of SM Foundation.
