= Simborio =

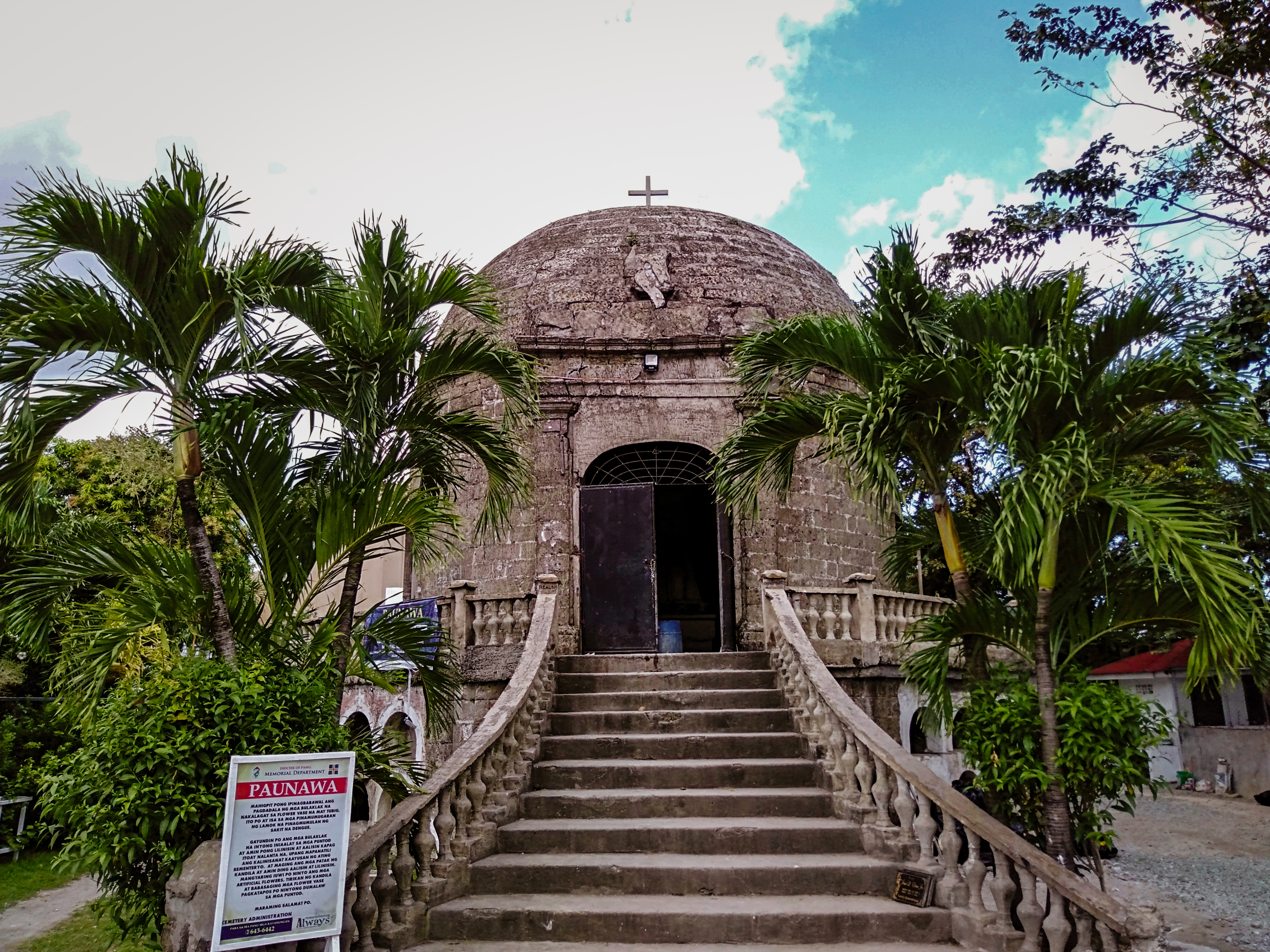
- The Simborio in 2020

- Location in Metro Manila Location in Luzon Location in the Philippines
- 14°31′45″N 121°04′24″E
- Location: Tuktukan, Taguig
- Country: Philippines

History
- Founded: 1700

Architecture
- Architectural type: Dome

The Simborio is a dome-shaped structure at the center of St. Anne Cemetery in Taguig in the Philippines. It was built by the Filipinos during the 18th century through the supervision of Spanish Friars.

== Architecture ==
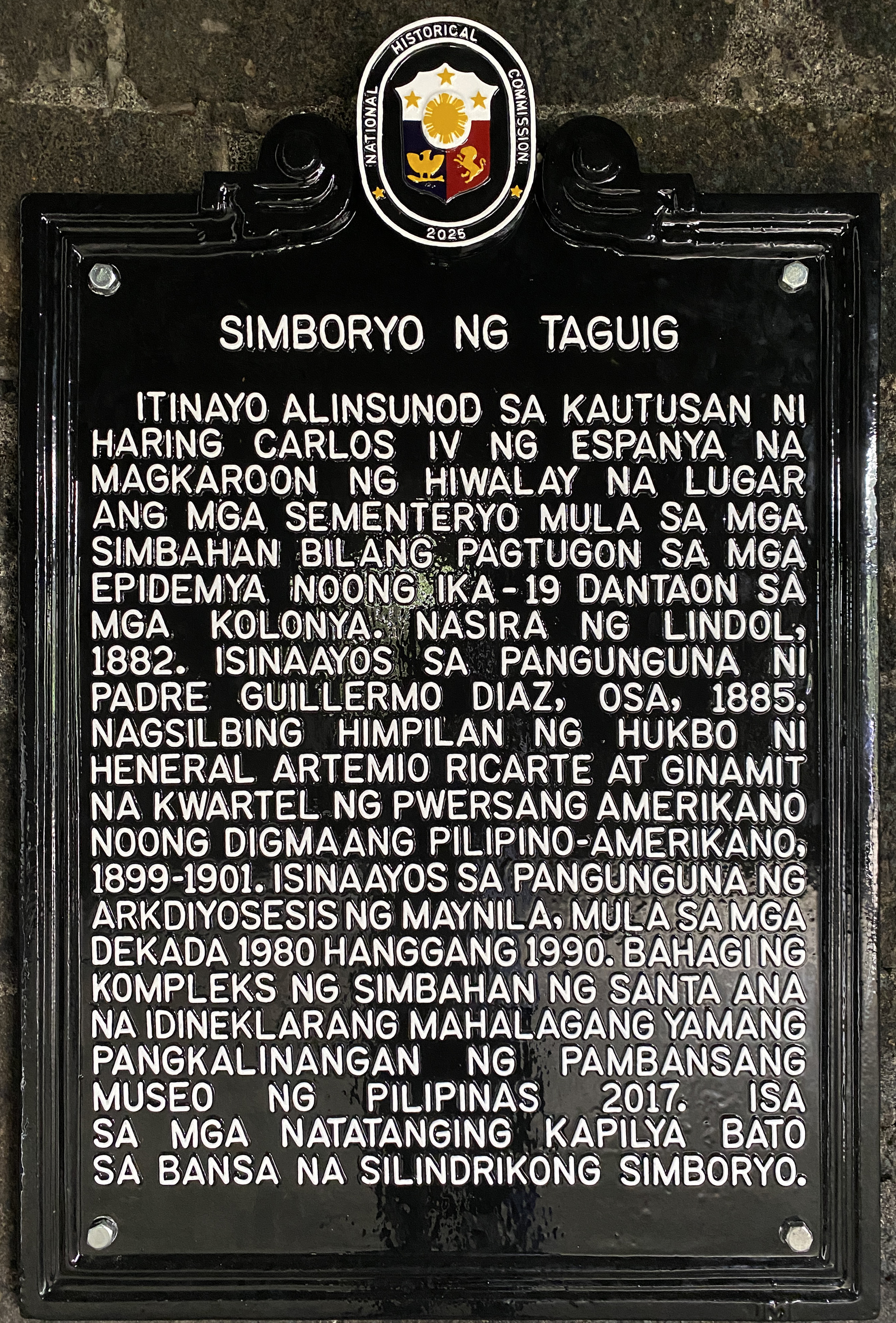
National historical marker installed inside the chapel in 2025

The dome's walls were made of stone and its diameter measures 12 meters. A small cross is situated on top of the dome. It has an 11-step stairway with rails on the left and right side leading up to an arched entrance door which is made of welded iron. A narrow patio surrounds the entire dome. Inside it, a small altar is found.

There are only two windows, both with iron vertical bars. Stacked tombs of up to three levels high are situated below the dome.

== Renovations and present situation ==
Some minor renovations were done to the Simborio in 1980 and 1993. At present, the dome is used as storage of construction materials. Plants continue to sprout in the stone walls, covering the left part of the dome and roots are visibly attached to the walls inside the dome. Vandalism is manifested in both its interior and exterior walls.

== Gallery ==
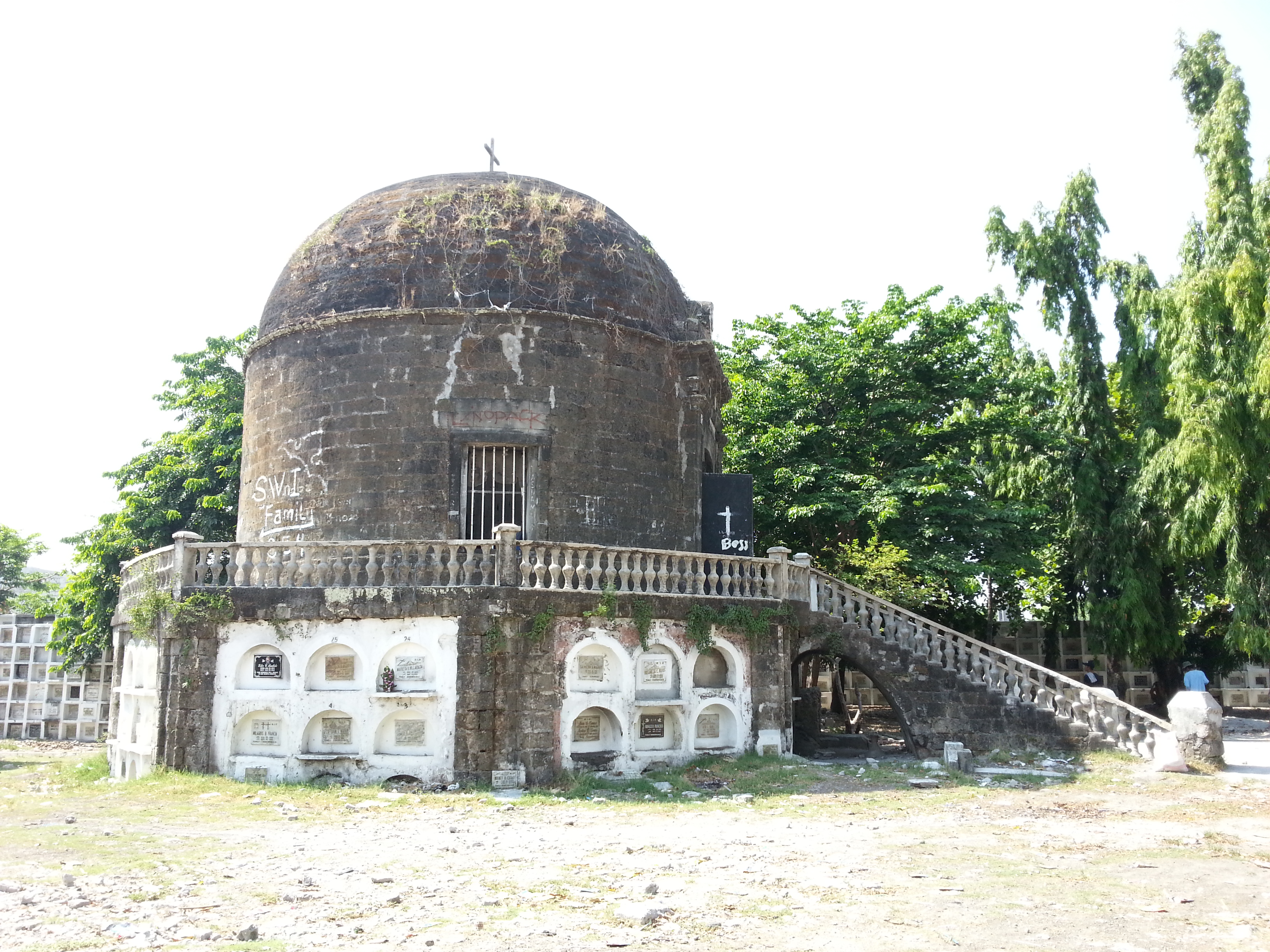
Left side of the Simborio

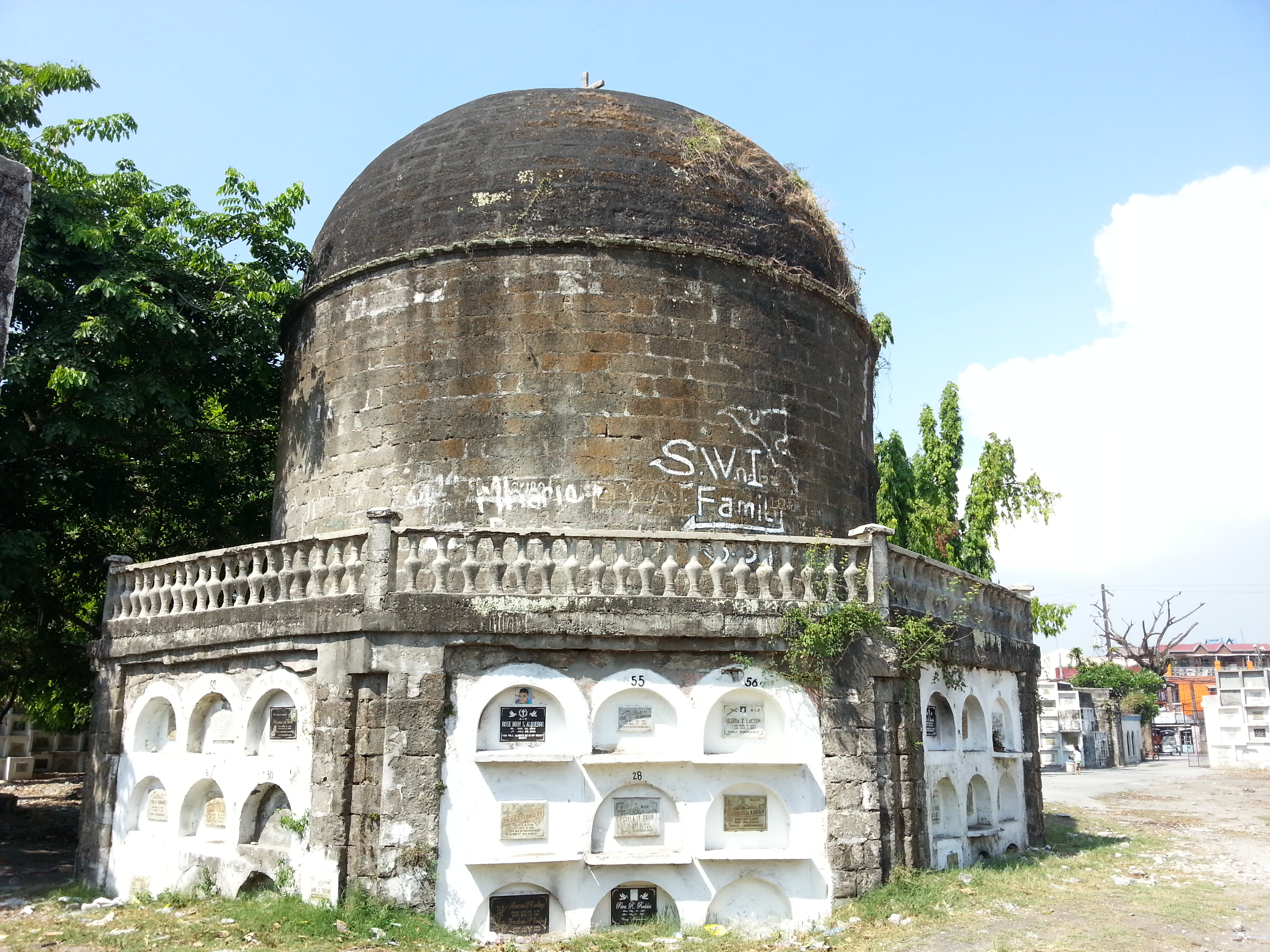
Rear of the Simborio

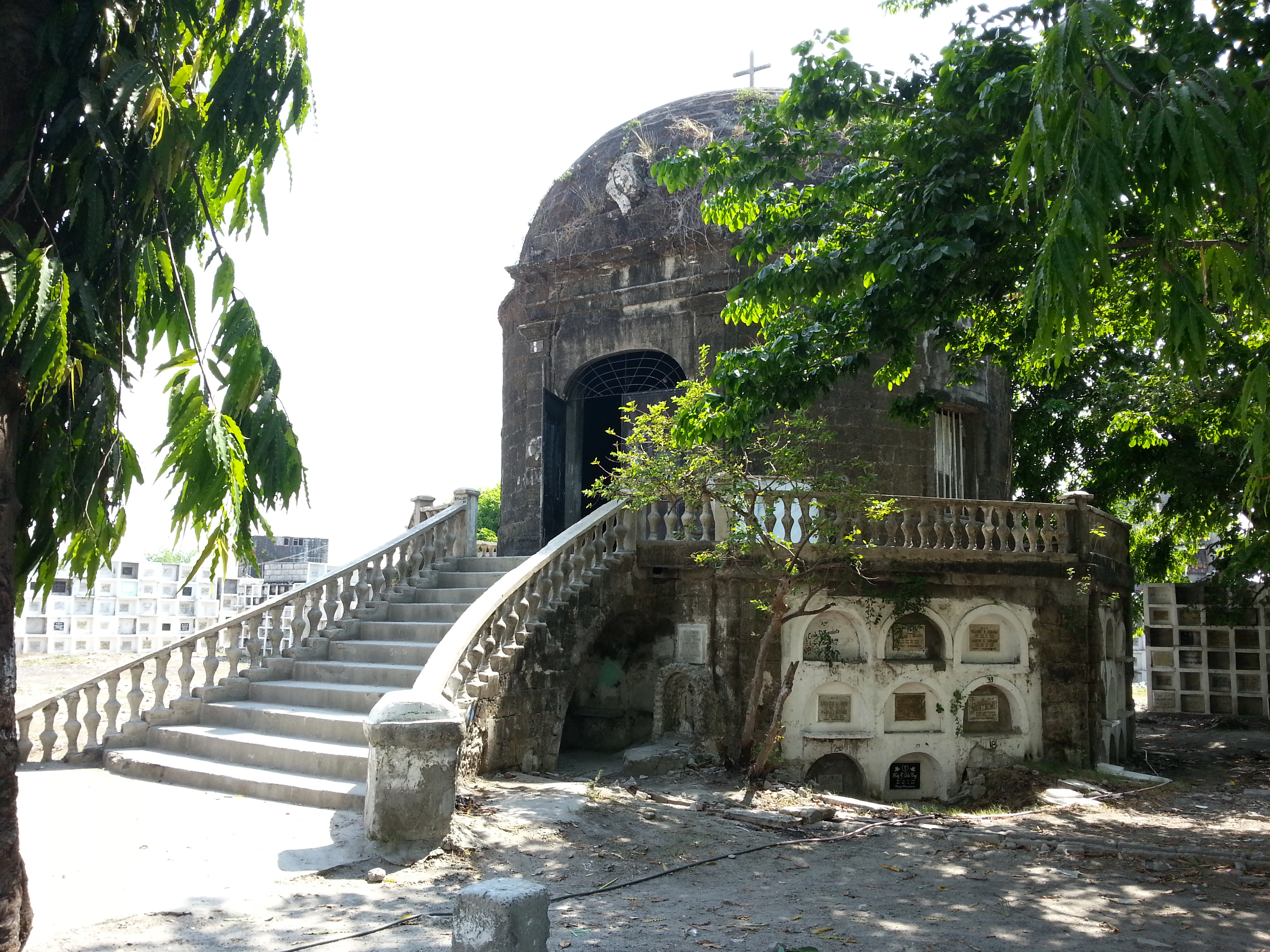
Right side of the Simborio

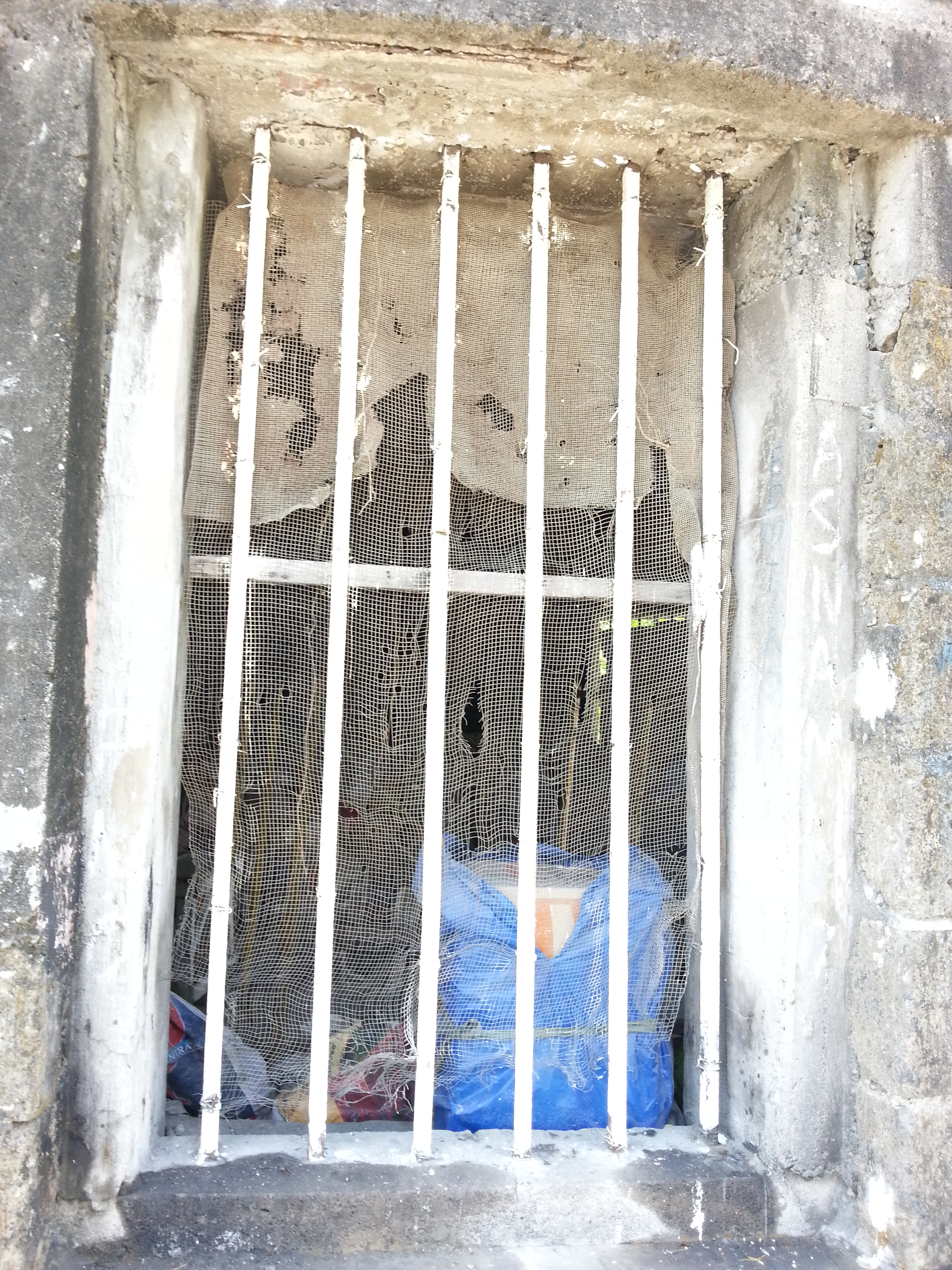
Window on the left side

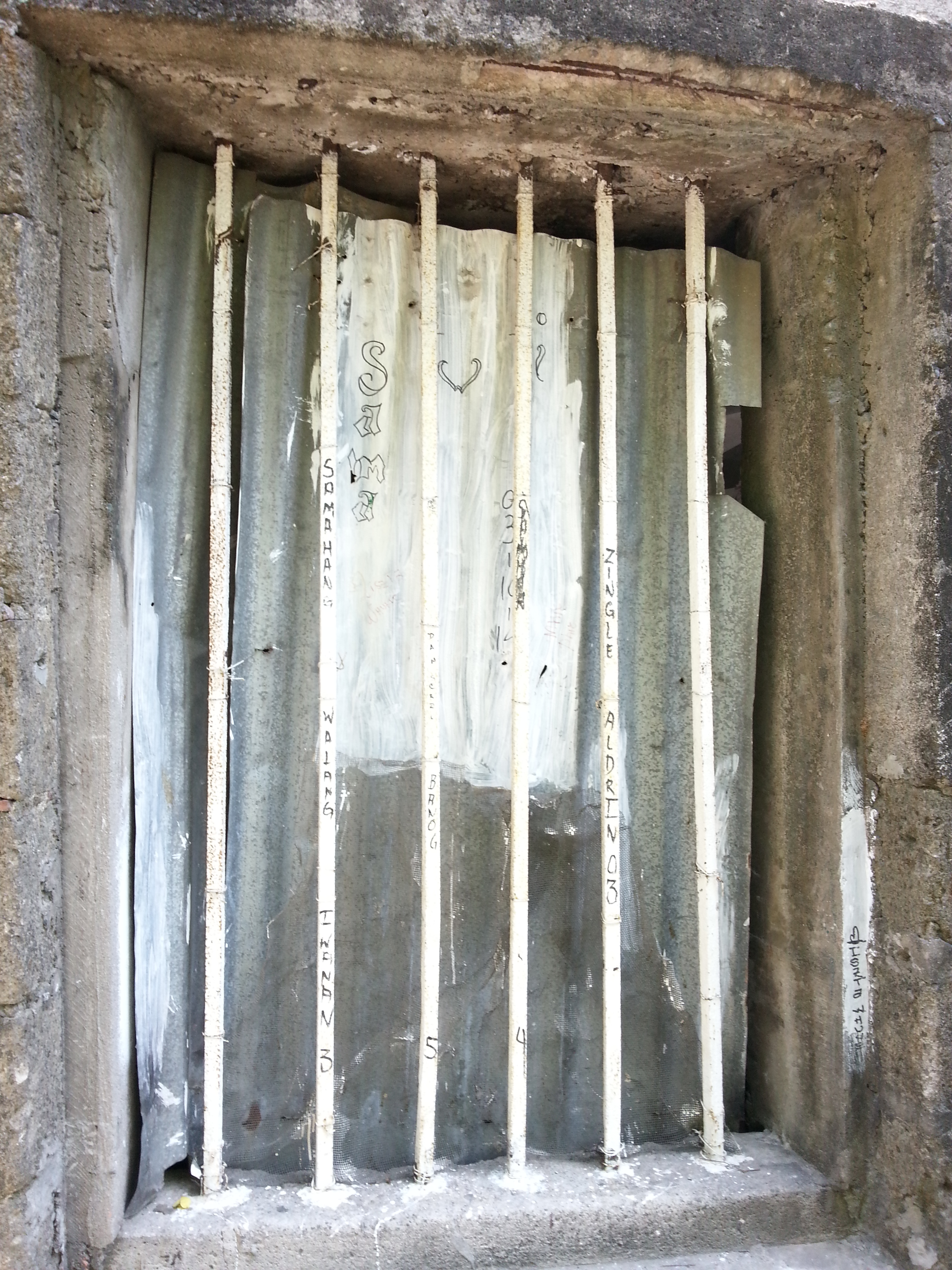
Window on the right side

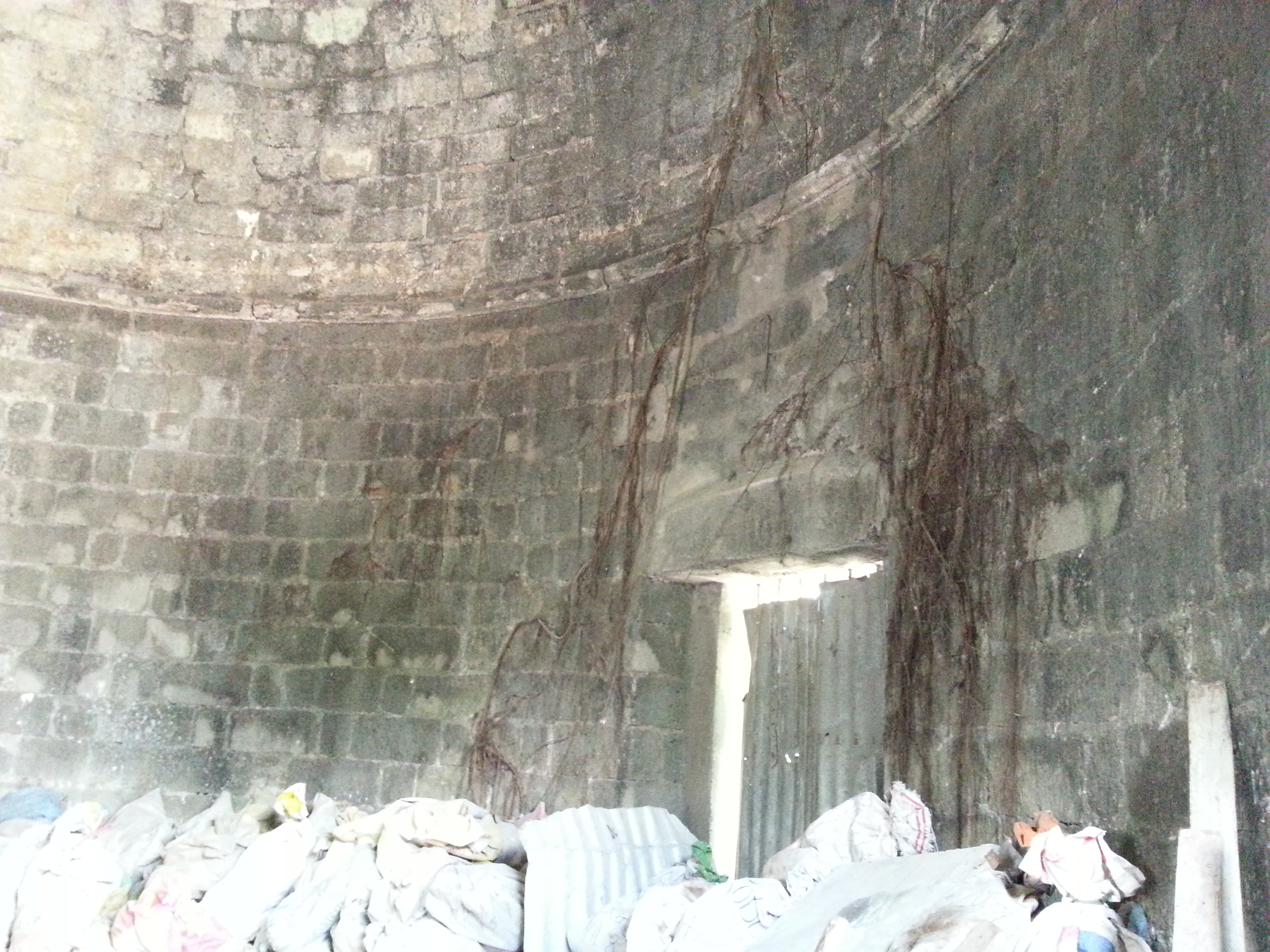
Plant roots penetrating the walls

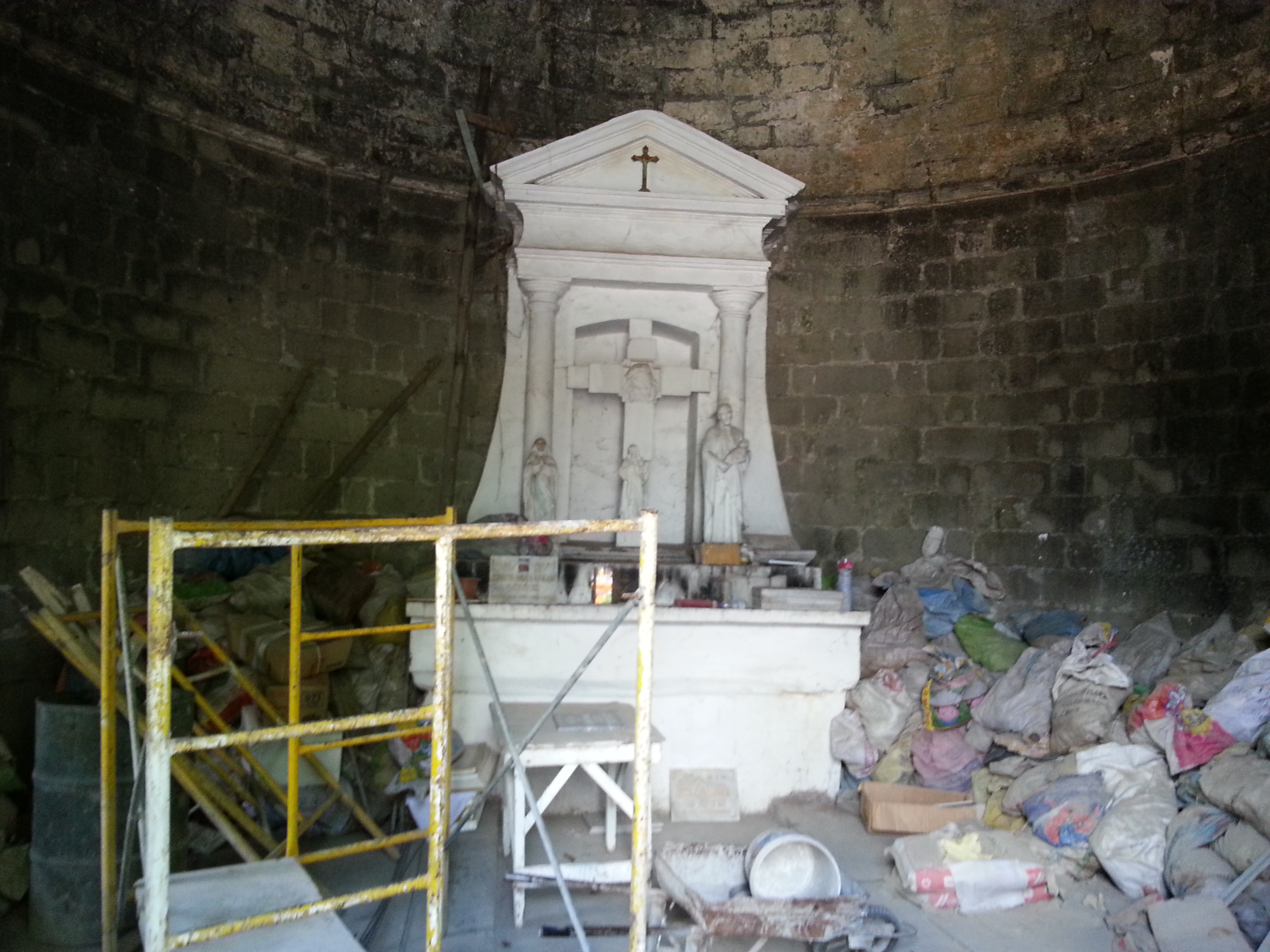
Interiors of the Simborio

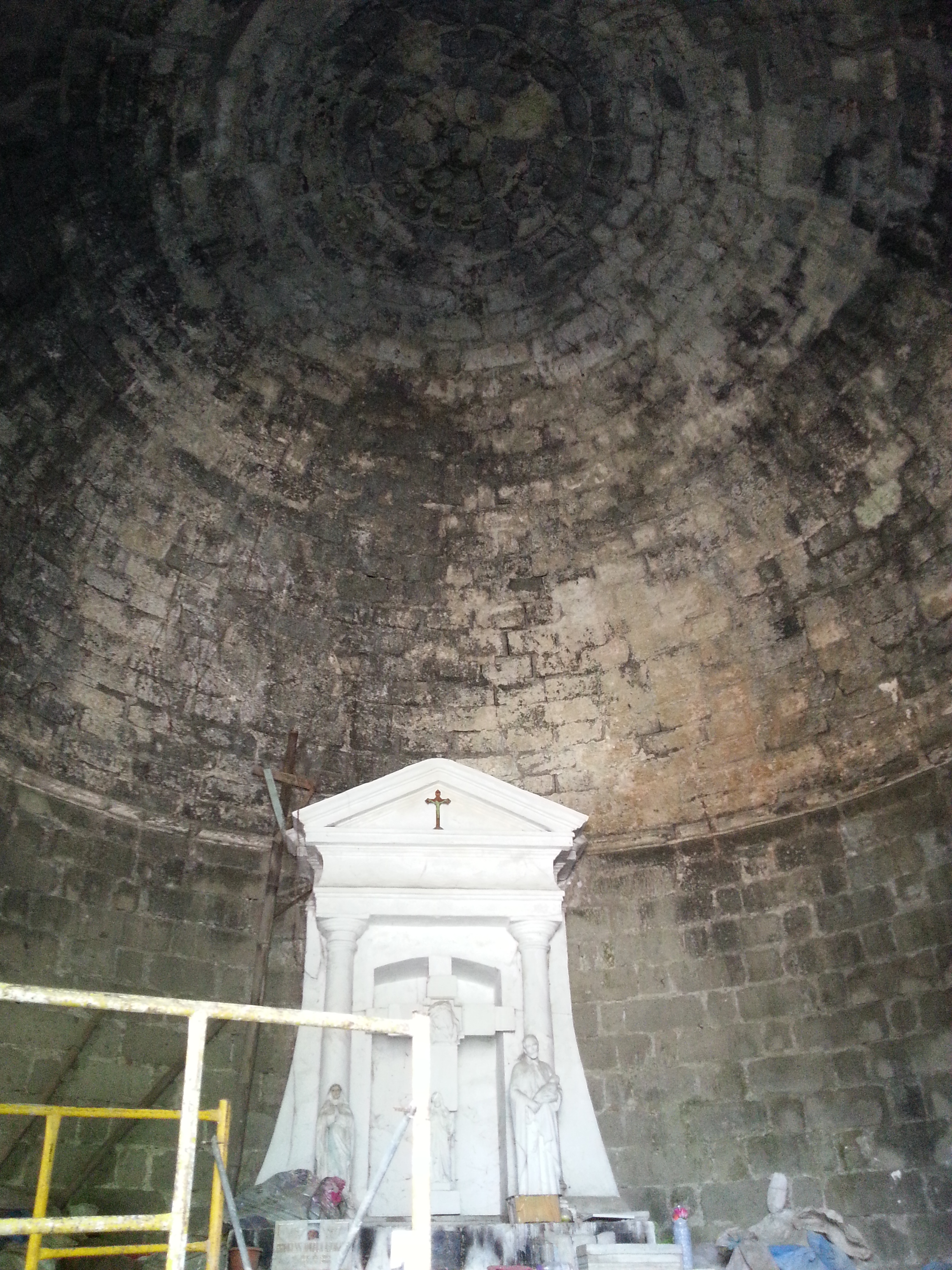
Inside the Simborio, topmost

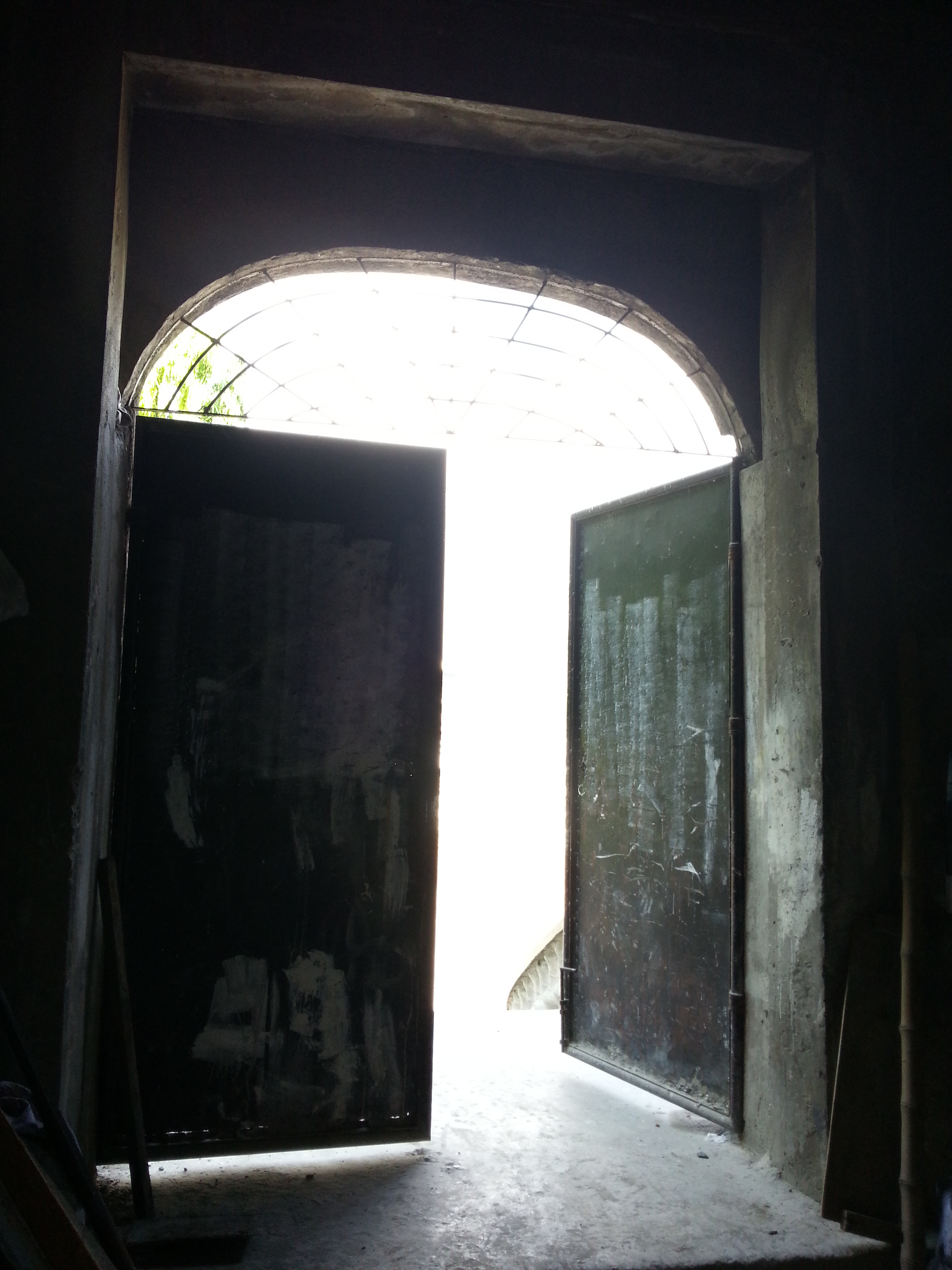
Rear of the entrance door

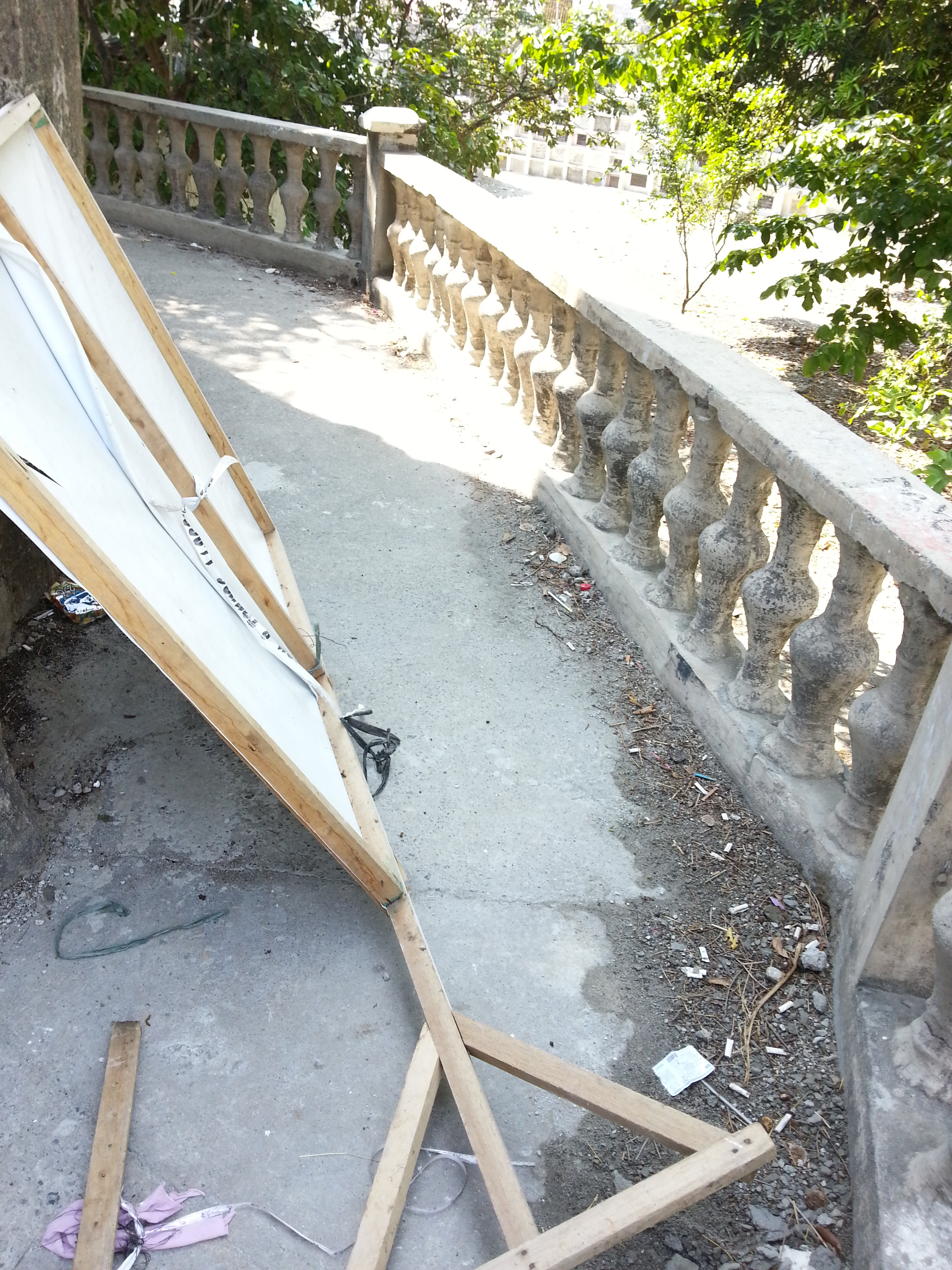
Balcony

== See also ==
- Saint Anne Parish Church (Taguig)
