= Laureana Franco =

Filipino catechist and Servant of God

Servant of God Laureana Franco
- Born: 4 July 1936; Hagonoy, Taguig, Rizal, Commonwealth of the Philippines
- Died: 17 October 2011 (aged 75); Taguig City, Philippines
- Cause of death: Ovarian cancer
- Resting place: Hagonoy Catholic Cemetery, Taguig City, Philippines (2011–2025); Minor Basilica and Archdiocesan Shrine Parish of Saint Anne, Taguig City, Philippines (2025–present)

Laureana Franco (4 July 1936 – 17 October 2011), also known as "Ka Luring Franco", was a Filipino Catholic catechist and member of the Legion of Mary who devoted her life to serving her local diocese and its poor. Her cause for beatification is being processed by the Diocese of Pasig.

== Biography ==
Laureana Franco was born on 4 July 1936, in Hagonoy, Taguig, near Manila, into a poor family. Aside from being the eldest of eight children, very little is known about her childhood and family background. Her parents were exceptionally pious and taught the Catholic faith to their children.

At a young age, she became a member of the Legion of Mary, where she developed a strong devotion to the Blessed Mother. Through experience with work assignments for the Legion, she became a dedicated catechist and found the vocation to which she devoted her life. In the entire Archdiocese of Manila, she was one of the only two women given permission to distribute Holy Communion.

She gave up her post at the Philippine Air Force as a switchboard operator and accounting clerk and enrolled at the Institute for Catechetics in Manila to prepare for full-time work as a catechist.

In a feature interview with UCA in 1993, Ka Luring revealed she refused the Mormon recruiters' help for her mother dying of cancer in exchange for her membership. Ka Luring said, "I can fool myself and I can fool you into believing I have changed my faith and give catechesis for you, just for the salary. But I can never fool God, he will know the truth."

After struggling patiently with ovarian cancer, she died on 17 October 2011.

== Awards ==
On 1 April 1990, through the recommendation of Cardinal Jaime Sin, Franco received the Pro Ecclesia et Pontifice award from Pope John Paul II for her exemplary service as a lay catechist.

In 2002, Laureana received the Mother Teresa Award, a project of AY Foundation Inc. and the Manila Jaycees, for her work with the poor and needy.

== Beatification process ==
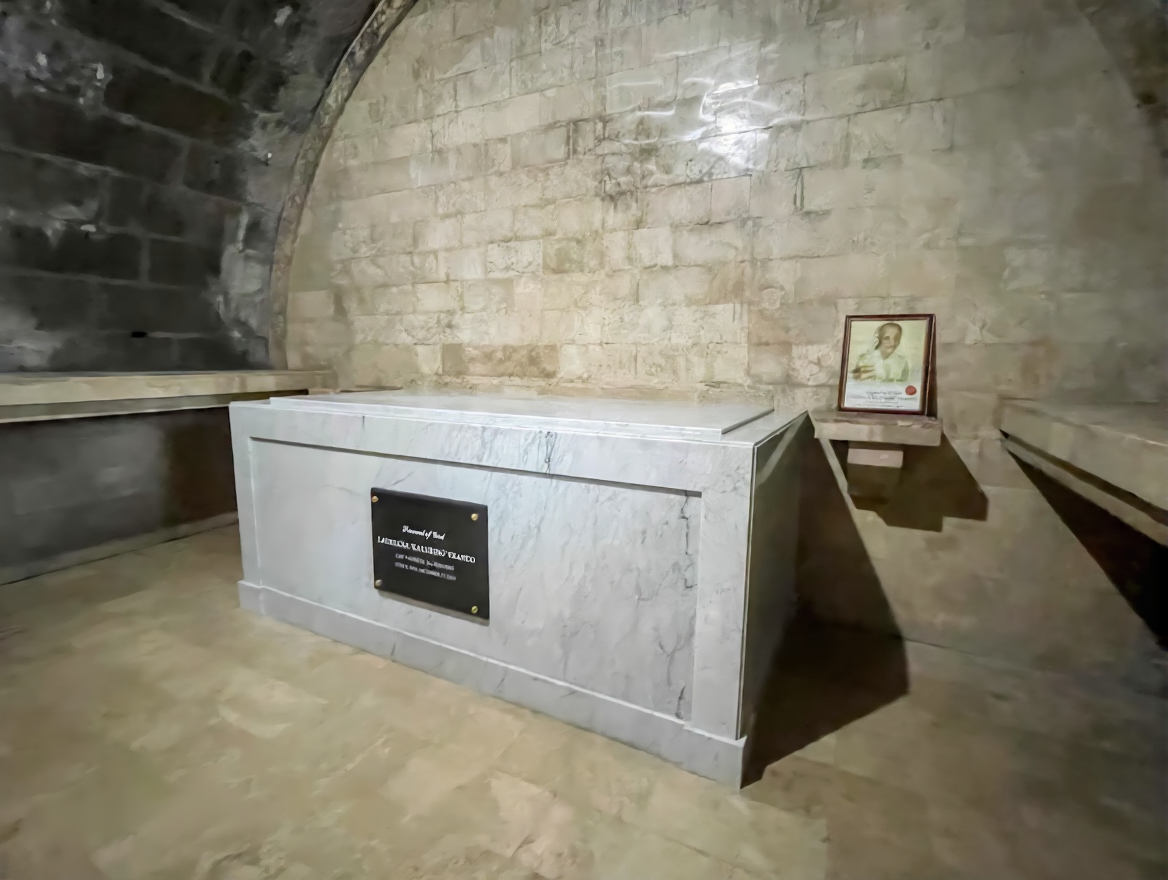
Tomb of the Servant of God Laureana Franco at the Minor Basilica and Archdiocesan Shrine Parish of Saint Anne in Taguig, Philippines.

On February 26, 2024, Bishop Mylo Hubert Vergara of the Diocese of Pasig announced the opening of the beatification process. In July 2024, the Diocese of Pasig received a letter from the Dicastery for the Causes of Saints granting nihil obstat allowing to commence its local inquiry for Franco's cause of beatification. The letter of protocol was received by Bishop Mylo Hubert Vergara from the apostolic nuncio Archbishop Charles Brown and his counselor, Msgr. Giuseppe Trentadue.

On August 21, 2024, the diocesan inquiry has been formally opened at the Minor Basilica and Archdiocesan Shrine Parish of Saint Anne in Taguig. Members of the tribunal for the said inquiry are Chairman of the Catholic Bishops' Conference of the Philippines (CBCP) Office for the Postulation of the Causes of Saints Laoag Bishop Renato Mayugba, Pasig Diocese Vicar General Fr. Orlando Cantillo, and the Rector and Parish Priest of the Minor Basilica and Archdiocesan Shrine Parish of Saint Anne.

Meantime, Dr. Erickson Javier, the postulator for the cause of Ka Luring submitted the “supplex libellus” to Bishop Vergara, who created a Historical Commission on Franco’s works and contributions.

On December 12, 2025, the remains of Laureana were exhumed from Hagonoy Catholic Cemetery and transferred to the Minor Basilica and Archdiocesan Shrine Parish of Saint Anne, also in Taguig.

== See also ==
- List of Filipinos venerated in the Catholic Church
