= Taguig Church =

Roman Catholic church in Taguig, Philippines

Minor Basilica of Saint Anne
- Minor Basilica and Archdiocesan Shrine Parish of Saint Anne
- Taguig Church; Santa Ana Church
- Basílica Menor de Santa Ana (Spanish)
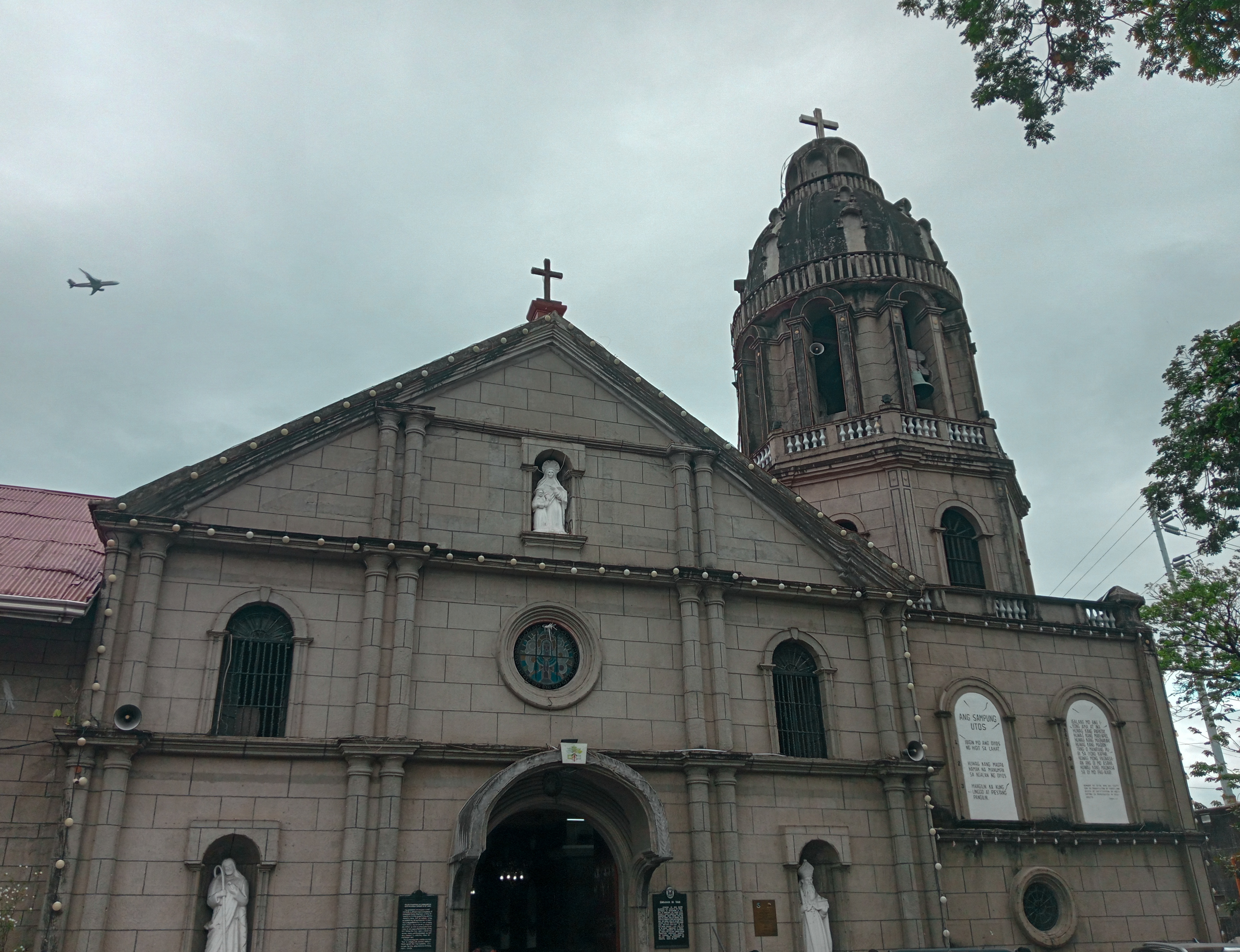
- Church facade in 2024
- Minor Basilica of Saint Anne
- 14°31′37″N 121°04′26″E
- Location: 41 Liwayway Street, Santa Ana, Taguig
- Country: Philippines
- Denomination: Roman Catholic
- Website: www.shrineofstannetaguig.org

History
- Former name: Saint Anne Parish Church
- Status: Minor basilica
- Founded: 1587
- Founder: Diego Alvarez

Architecture
- Functional status: Active
- Heritage designation: Cultural Property
- Designated: July 25, 1987
- Architectural type: Church building
- Style: Baroque

Administration
- Diocese: Pasig
- Parish: Saint Anne

Clergy
- Bishop: Mylo Hubert Vergara
- Rector: Orlando Cantillon
- Vicar: Rodifel de Leon

The Minor Basilica and Archdiocesan Shrine Parish of Saint Anne (Filipino: Basilika Minor at Dambana ng Arkodiyosesis Parokya ng Santa Ana), commonly known as Taguig Church (Note: Filipino: Simbahan ng Tagig/Taguig) or Santa Ana Church, (Note: Filipino: Simbahan ng Santa Ana) is a Roman Catholic church and minor basilica located in Barangay Santa Ana, Taguig, Philippines. It is under the jurisdiction of the Diocese of Pasig. The church is situated next to the Taguig River and across Plaza Quezon, where the statue of Manuel L. Quezon was erected during his tenure as President of the Philippines. Saint Anne is the patroness of the church.

== History ==
=== Building of the church ===
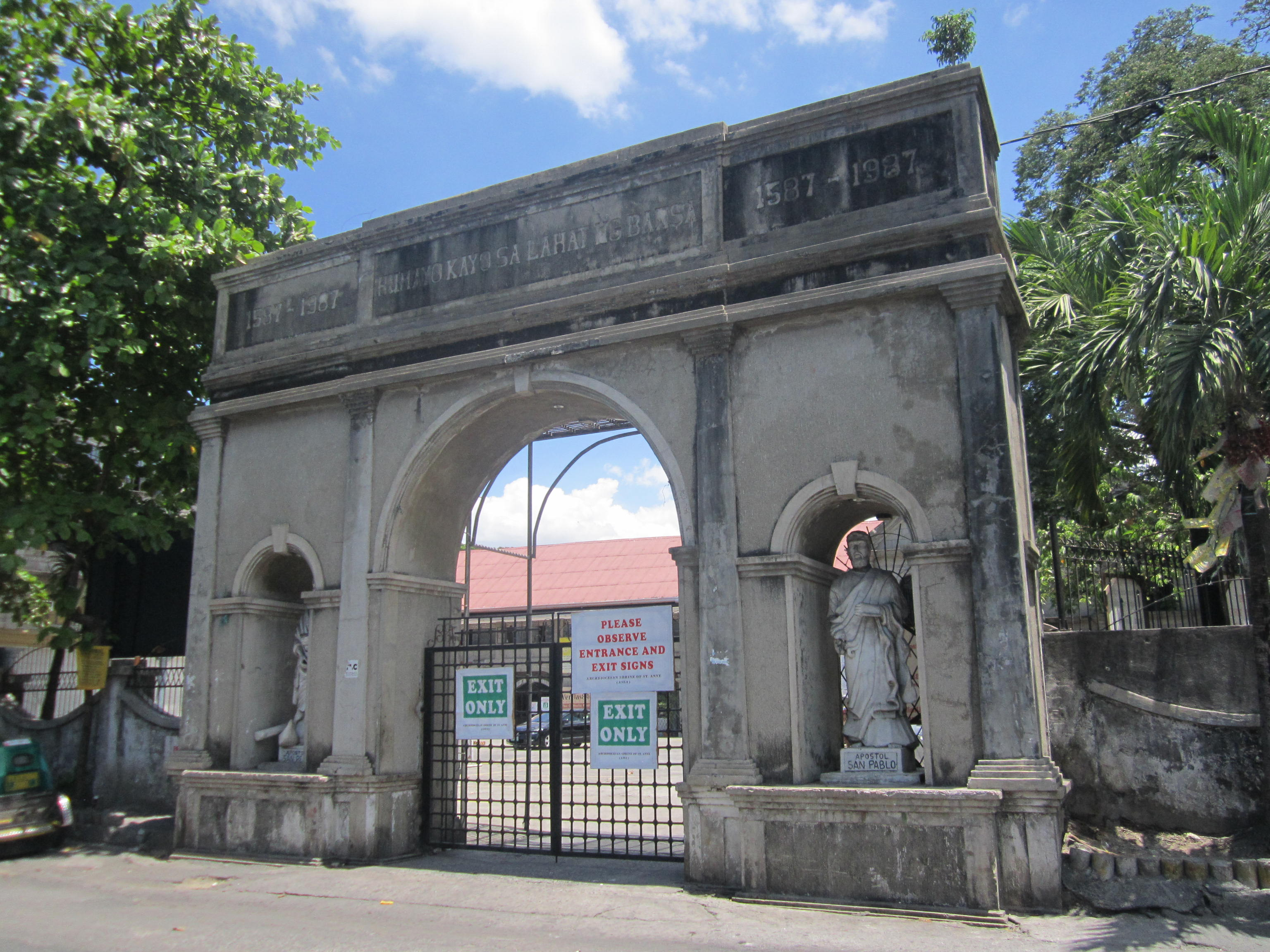
Arched entrance to the church

In 1571, the Spaniards subjugated mainland Luzon including Taguig through the Legazpi expedition. Between the years 1582 and 1583, Taguig became part of the Encomienda del Tondo and was under the headship of an Alcalde Mayor, Captain Vergara. Taguig was eventually established as a separate town in 1587 and was declared a parish with St. Anne as its chosen patroness. Augustinian friars, Diego Alvarez and his assistant, Diego de Avila, were assigned to begin religious activities in Taguig.

The first concrete church for use of the faithful was built by Hernando Guerrero in 1609; however, the 1645 Luzon earthquake caused it considerable damage. In 1848, Andres Diaz began the construction of a new church complex; this too, unfortunately, was destroyed by the tremor of 1882. To continue administering to the spiritual needs of the faithful, a makeshift church was used until the construction of a permanent one.

Construction of the present church started during the term of Patricio Martin in 1883. He, however, did not see its completion due to his early death. His successor, Guillermo Diaz, continued with the project and saw its eventual completion.

During the early American Period, secular priests of the Archdiocese of Manila succeeded the Augustinian Friars in Taguig. The first of these was Silbino Labao of Tipas. He was followed by Vicente Estacio of Tipas who oversaw the installation of the church's sawali ceiling. Gerardo Maximo completed the rehabilitation of the church. More improvements in the edifice were undertaken by Augurio Juta and Emmanuel Sunga in preparation for the parish's 400th anniversary in 1987.

=== Japanese Occupation of Rizal ===
In 1942, Imperial Japanese invaded the province of Rizal and established garrisons in the town. The church was remembered as the place where hundreds of male inhabitants were incarcerated for a number of days in August 1943.

=== Declaration as a Historic Site and Cultural Property ===
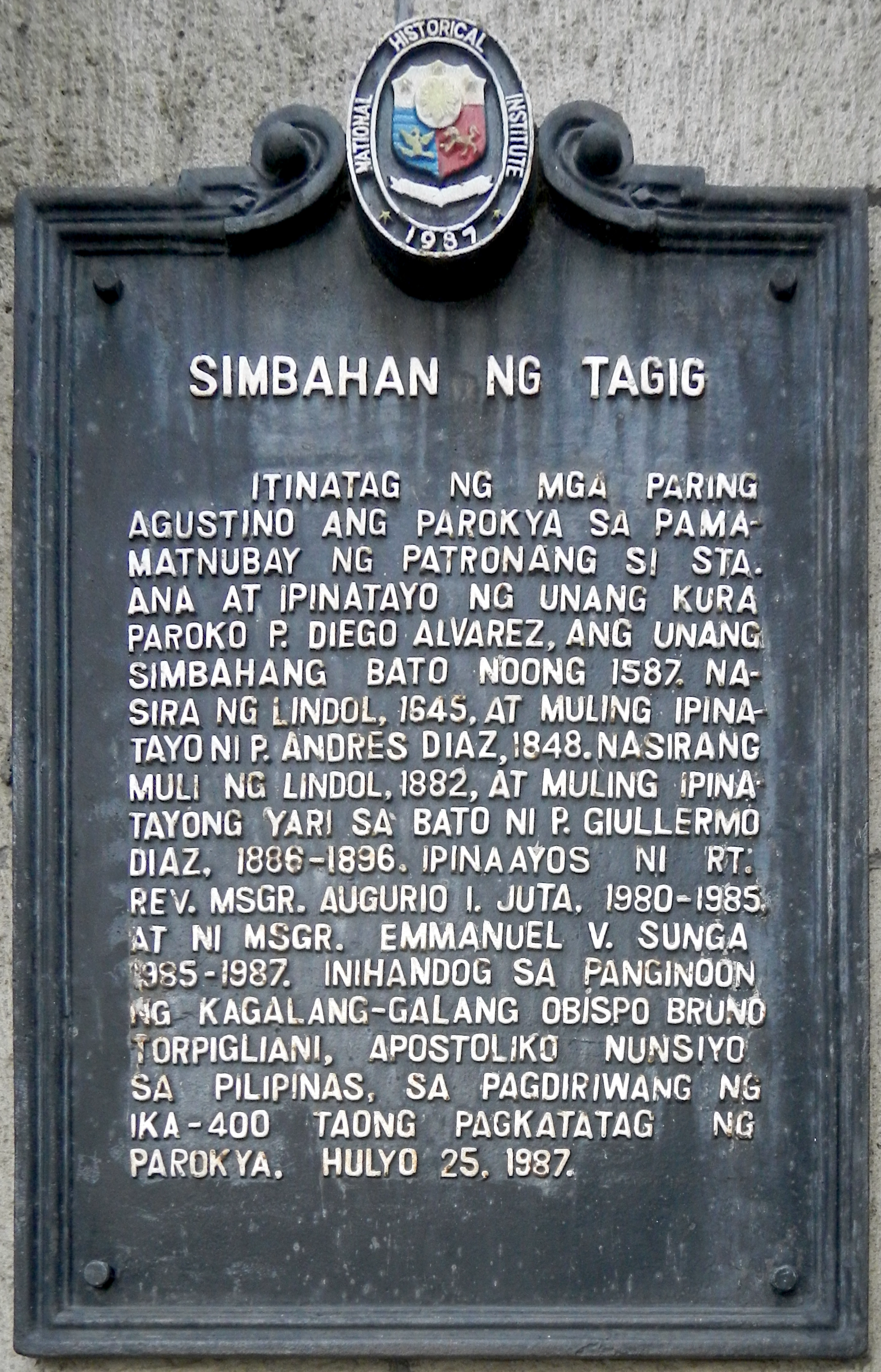
Church NHI historical marker installed in 1987

On July 25, 1987, the National Historical Commission of the Philippines installed a marker on Saint Anne Parish Church for its historical value and patriotic endeavors to dramatize the need to focus to the national consciousness the history of the country from the Filipino viewpoint and to evoke pride in the national heritage and identity. The church was also declared and recognized by the government as a cultural property based on the official list provided by the National Commission for Culture and the Arts, National Historical Commission of the Philippines and the National Museum of the Philippines.

=== Declaration as a Minor Basilica ===
On July 26, 2022, the Feast Day of St. Anne and Joachim, the Dicastery for Divine Worship and the Discipline of the Sacraments formally designated the Archdiocesan Shrine of St. Anne as a minor basilica; the first within the jurisdiction of the Diocese of Pasig.

=== Present ===
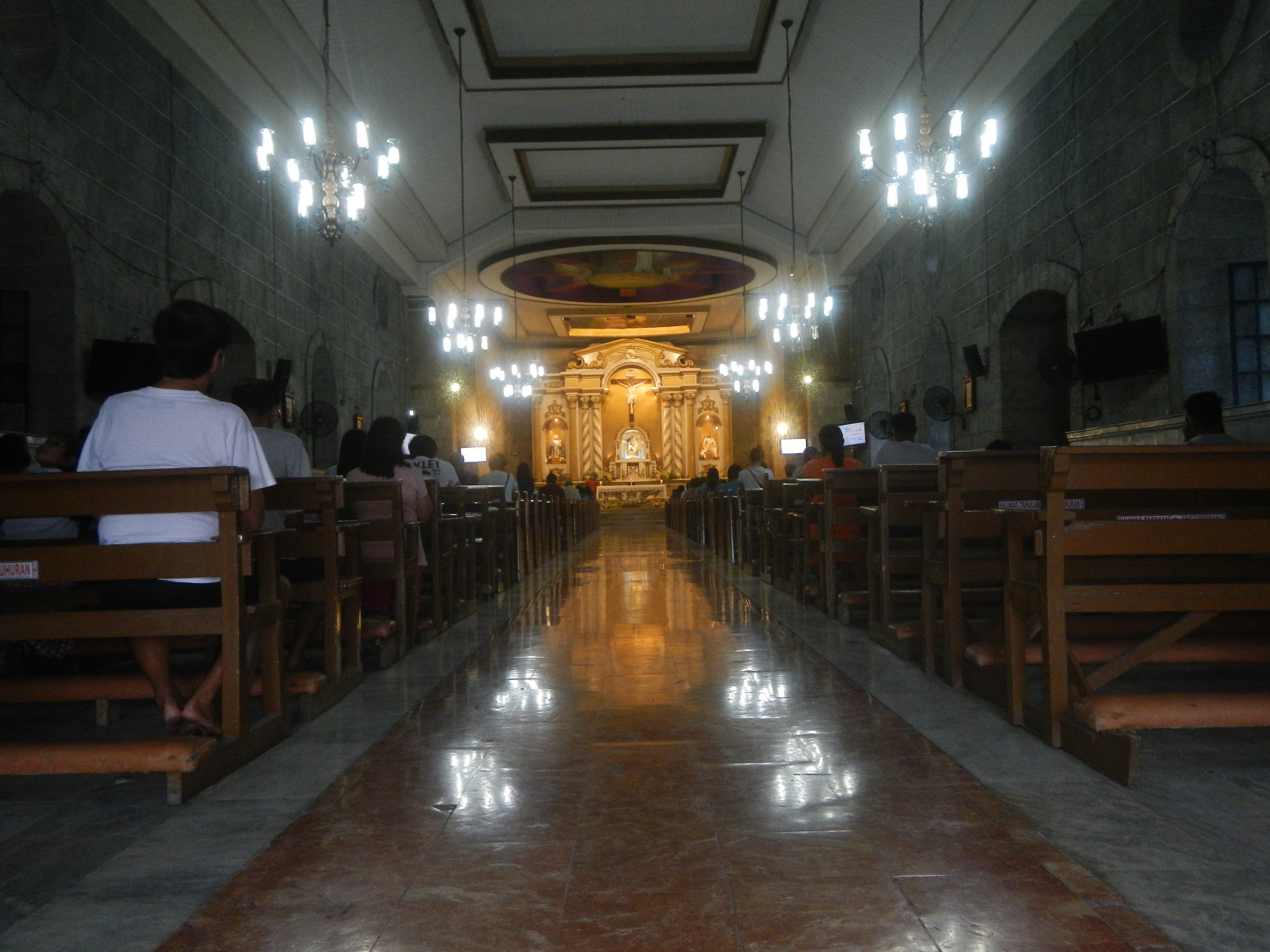
Church interior in 2018

The church houses the Museo de Sta. Ana, which contains religious relics and repository of artifacts detailing the rich religious culture and history of Taguig since 1857. On July 26 of each year, the church along with the City Government, celebrates Sta. Anang Banak Taguig River Festival which is a fluvial parade in honor of the town patroness. The thrills and excitement of the fishers are replayed each year by the pasubo where fluvial parade participants in colorful boats and spectators by the riverbanks toss fruits and native delicacies to each other.

Aside from the July festivities, which is also the Liturgical Feast of Sts. Joachim and Anne, the Pistang Pasasalamat (Thanksgiving Feast), locally known as Pistang Bayan ng Taguig (Taguig Town Fiesta) is celebrated every Quinquagesima, the Sunday preceding Ash Wednesday. It is a celebration of thanksgiving to St. Anne, especially for her intercession paved the way to the liberation of Taguig from the hands of the Japanese forces during the Second World War.

The church was formally declared as a Minor Basilica by the Holy See on July 26, 2022, coincidentally also during the feast of Saint Anne and Saint Joaquim.

== Architecture ==
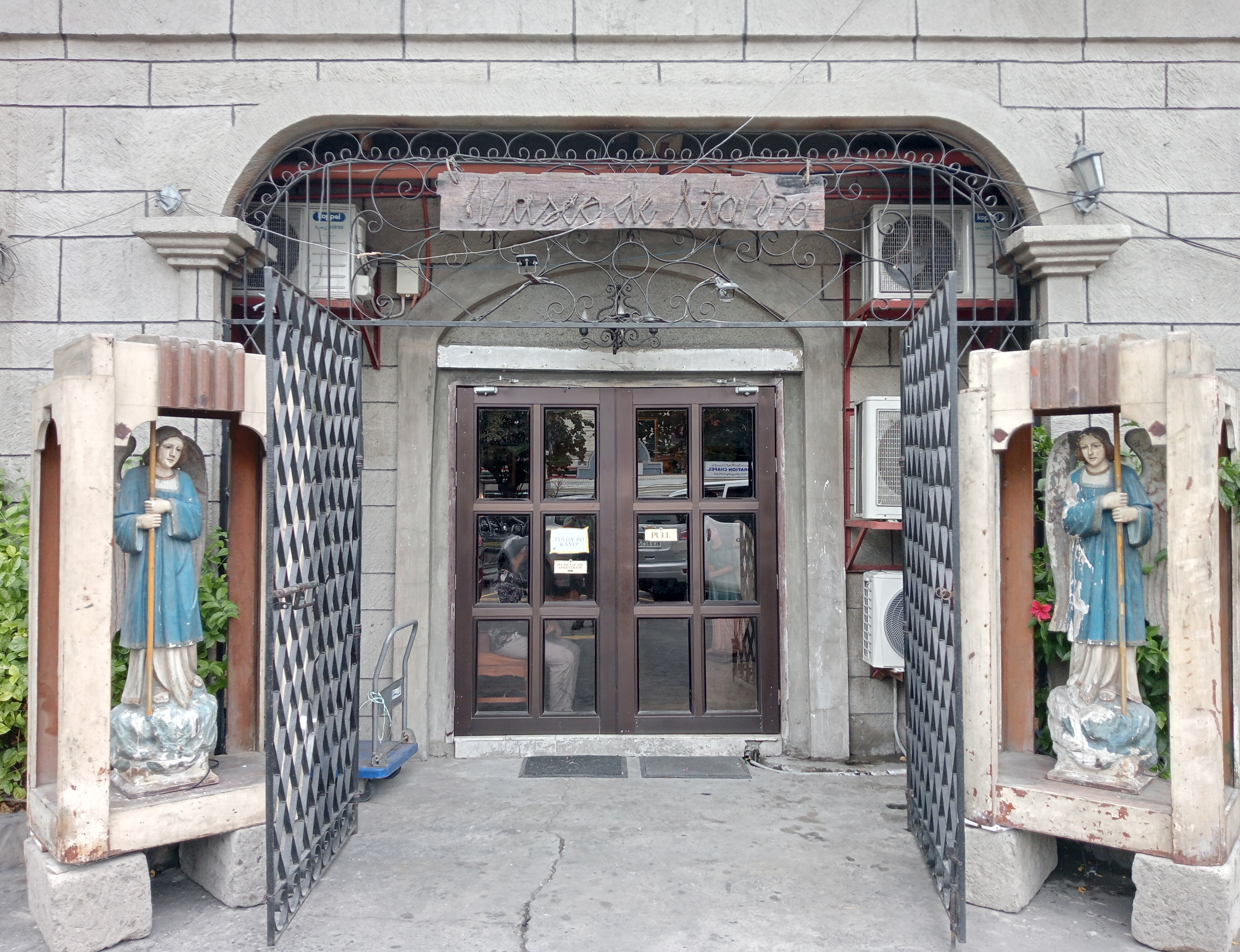
Museo de Santa Ana

According to architect Manuel Maximo Lopez Del Castillo Noche, a member of the International Council on Monuments and Sites (ICOMOS), the structure of the church follows the barn-style Baroque architecture design "with its very defined articulation of both vertical and horizontal bays topped by a simple triangular pediment."

== Cemetery ==
Among the notable features of the church complex of Santa Ana in Taguig is the old funerary chapel. Constructed in the 1700s using Filipino forced labor, the chapel is made up of tiles and walls of stones. It measures 12 meters (39 ft) in diameter with its ground level reserved as repository for bones. Despite minor repairs in 1980 and in 1993, the Simborio, as it is called, stands beautiful yet quaint in the old cemetery of the parish.

== Other burials ==
- Laureana Franco- (4 July 1936 – 17 October 2011) a Filipino catechist and member of the Legion of Mary, who is venerated as a Servant of God in the Roman Catholic Church.

== Gallery ==
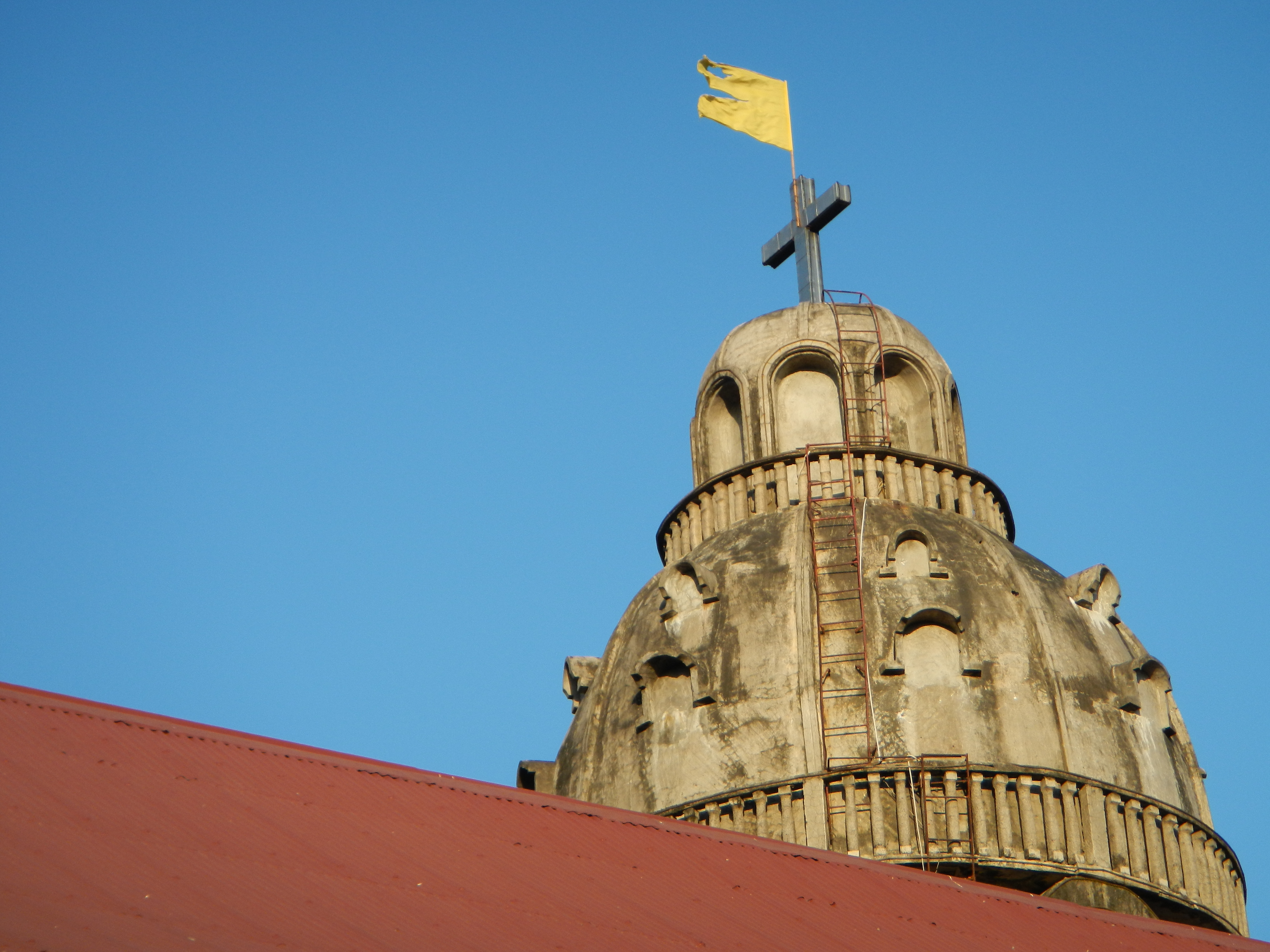
Church cupola

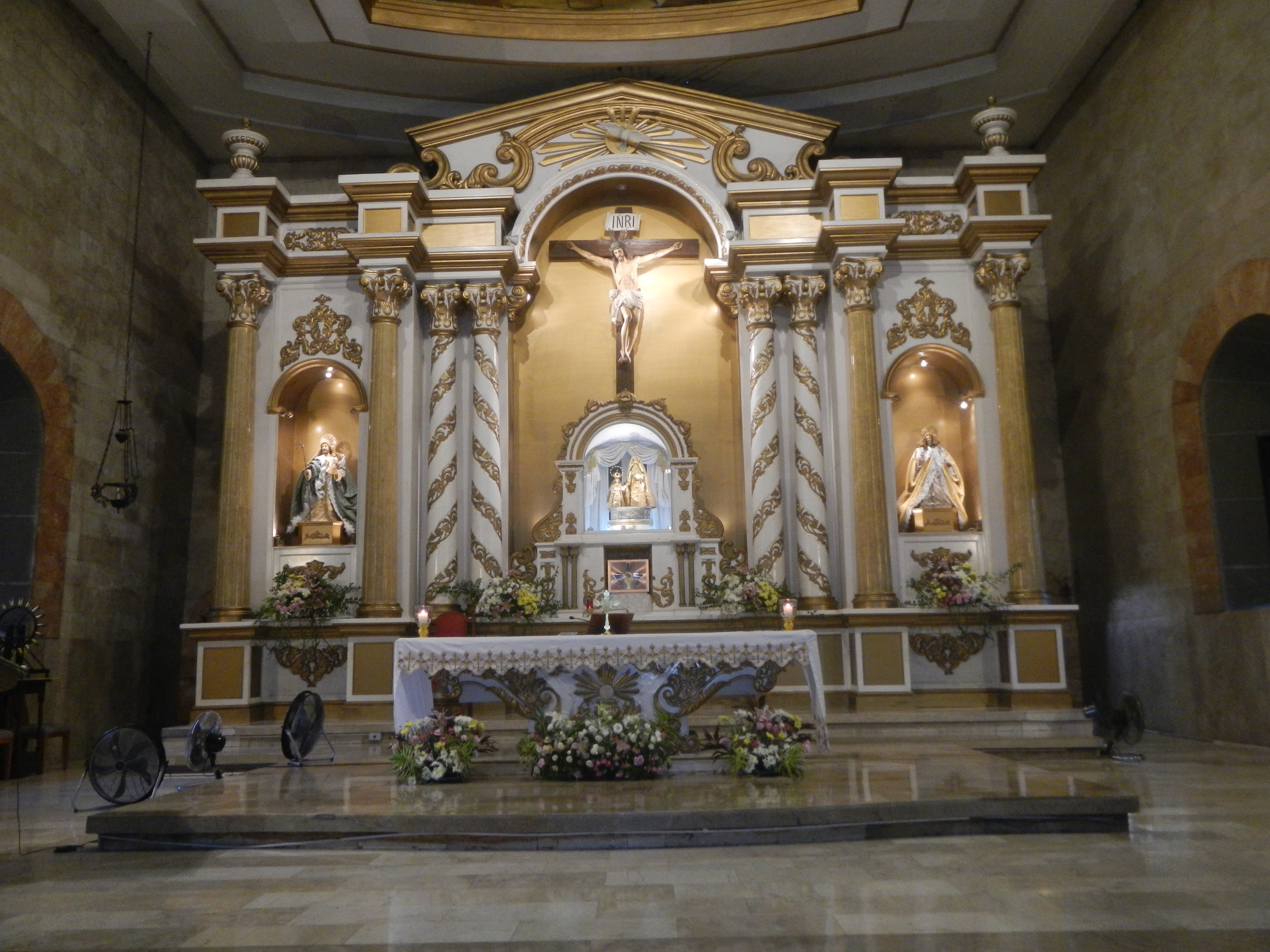
Church altar and reredos

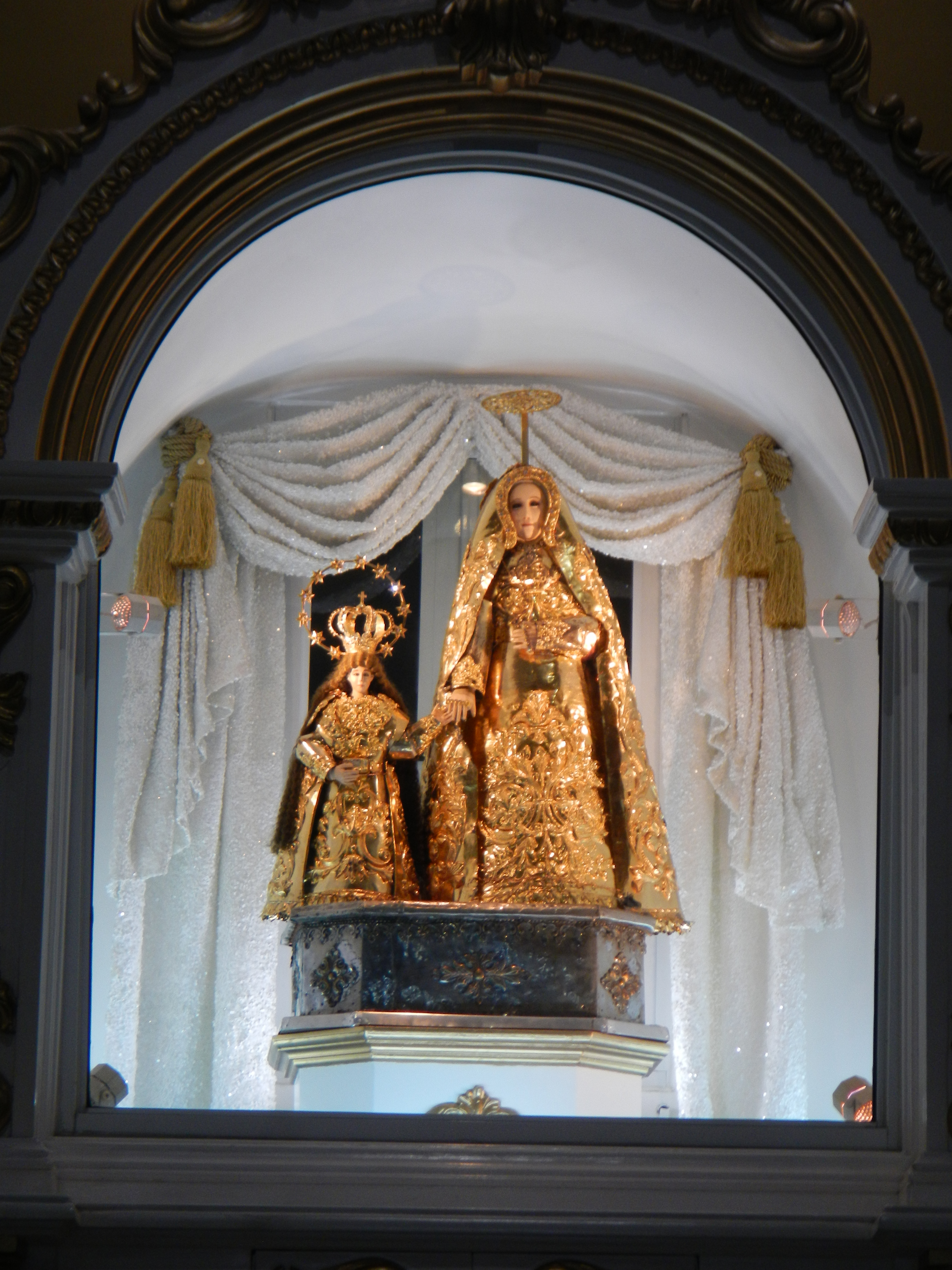
Statues of Saint Anne and Mary

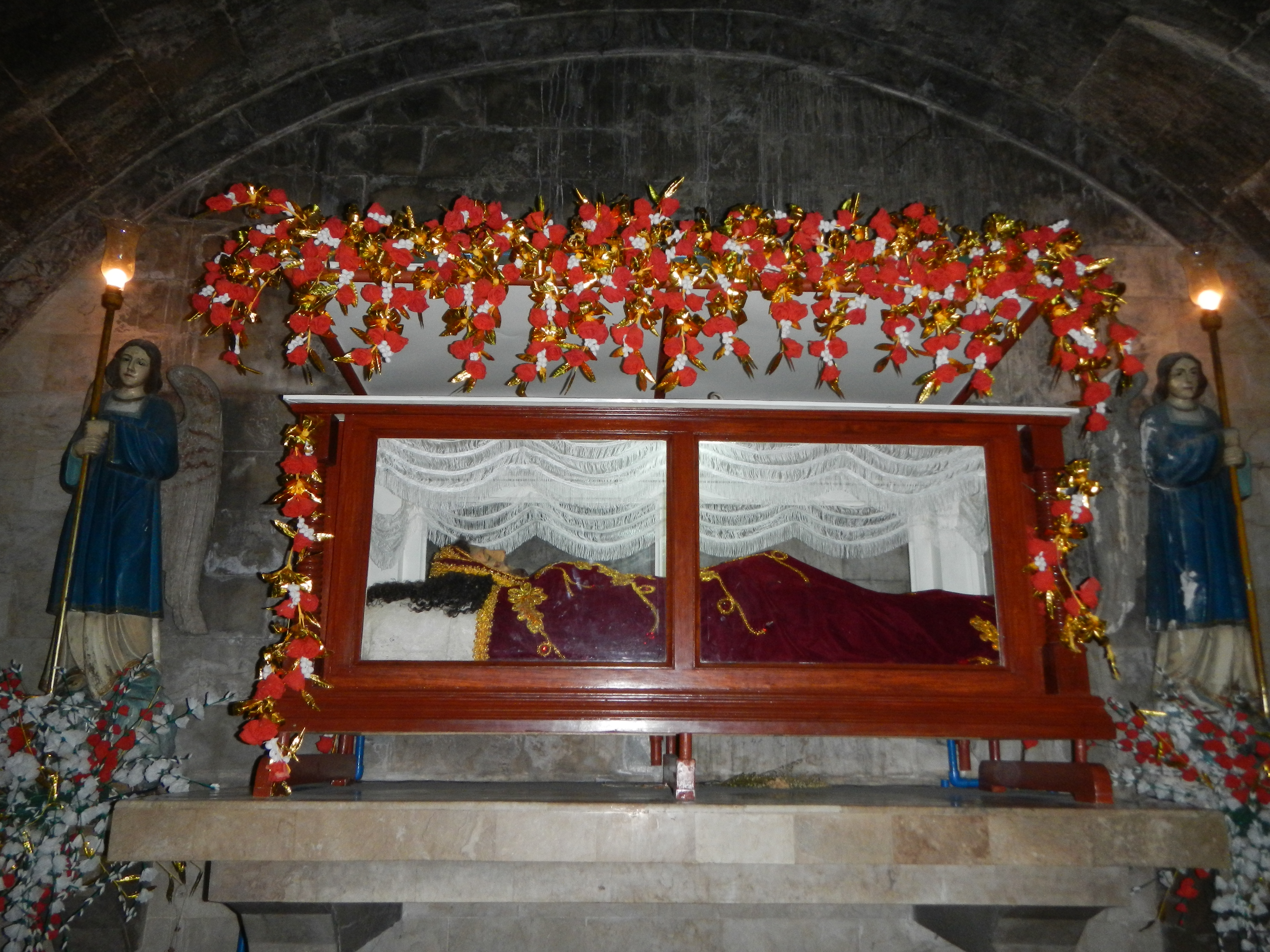
Santo Entierro

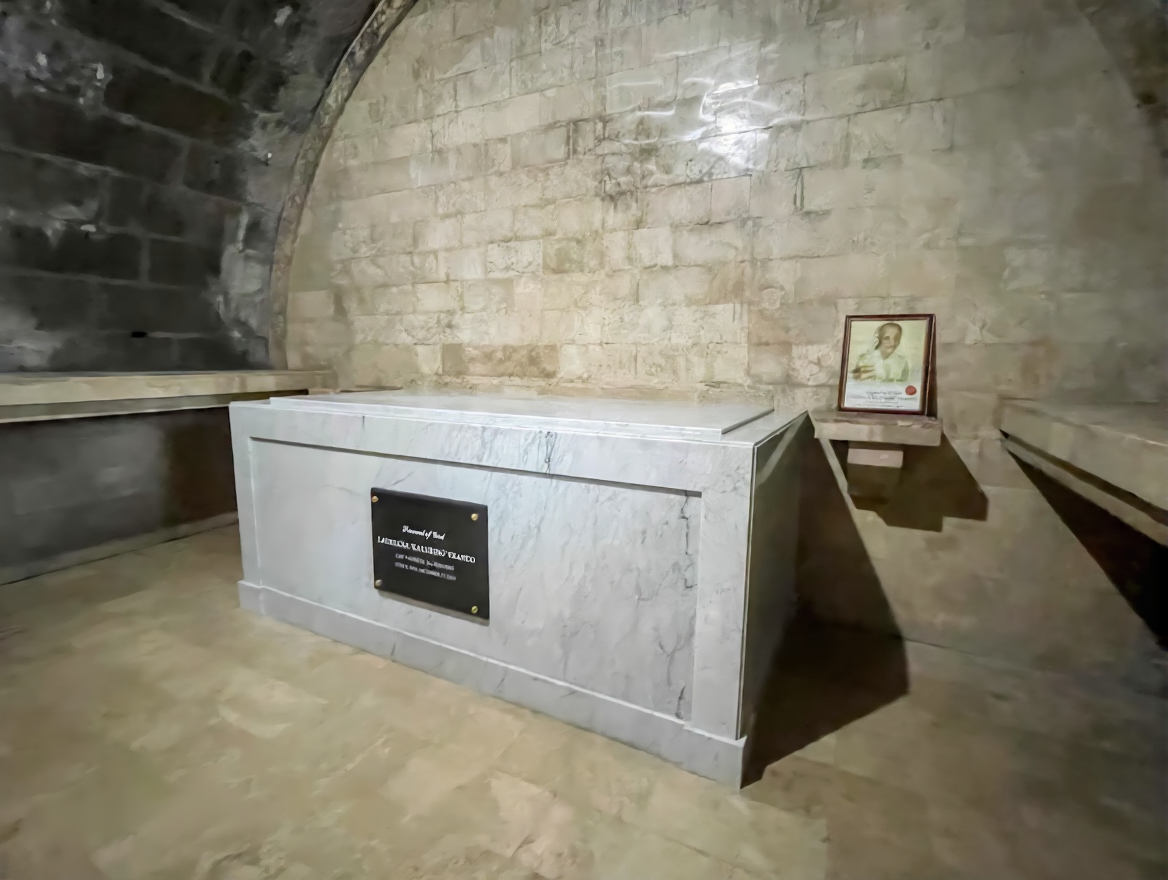
Tomb of the Servant of God Laureana Franco

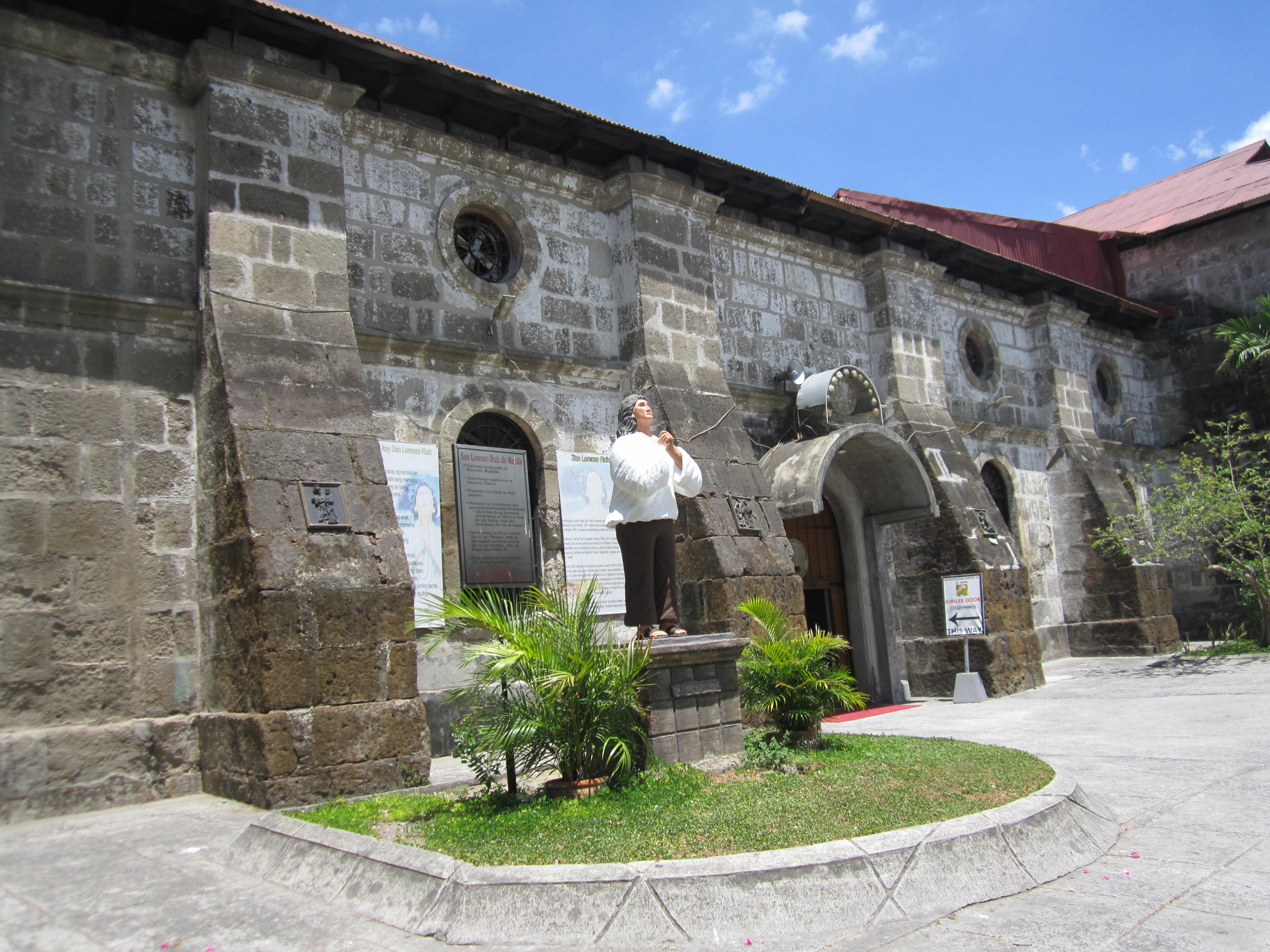
Church walls featuring buttresses and a monument of Saint Lorenzo Ruiz
