= List of historical markers of the Philippines overseas =

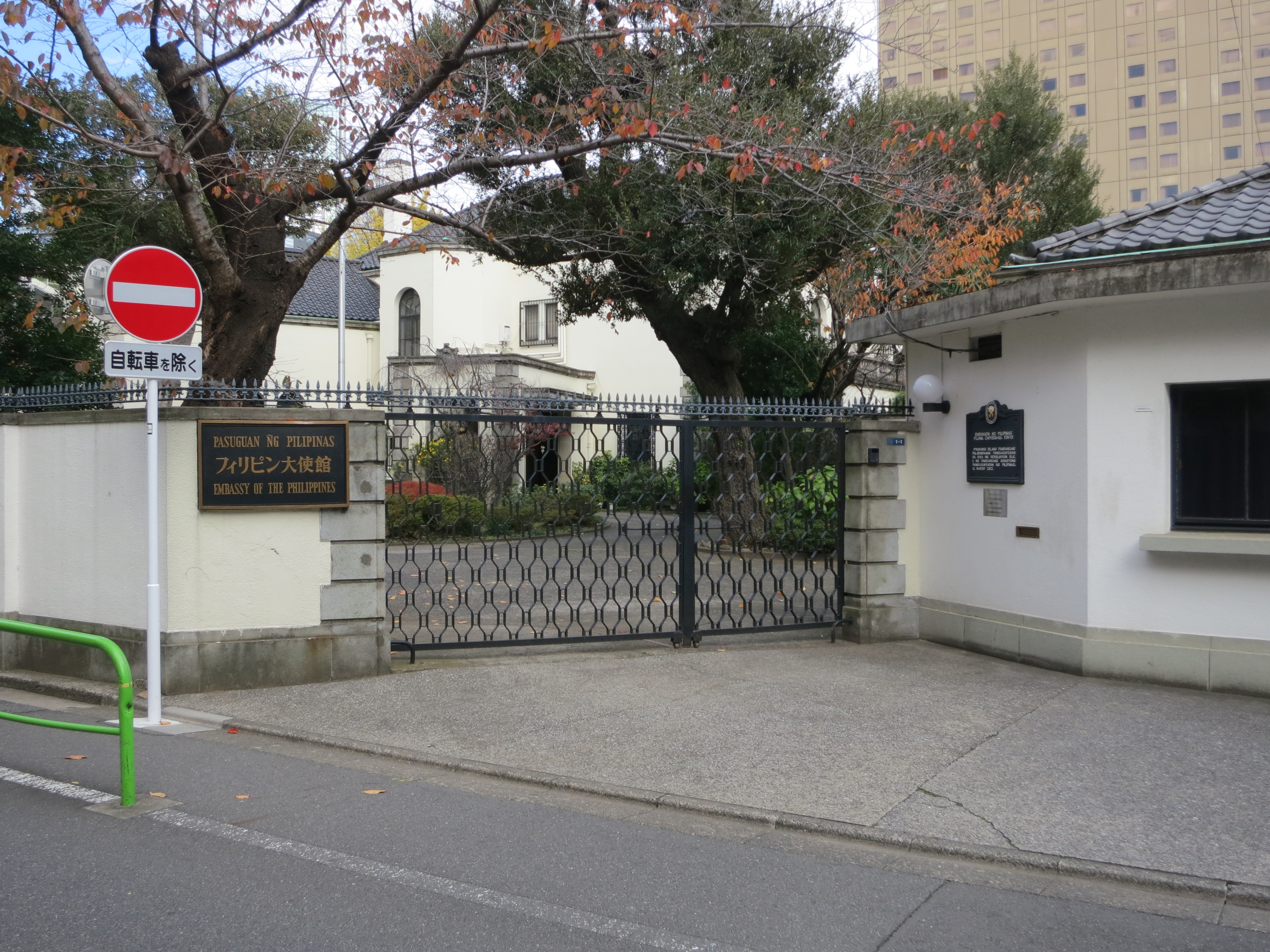
Historical marker by the gate of the Kudan, Tokyo, Japan

This list of historical markers installed by the National Historical Commission of the Philippines (NHCP) outside the Philippines is an annotated list of people, places, or events in the region that have been commemorated by cast-iron plaques issued by the said commission. The plaques themselves are permanent signs installed in publicly visible locations on buildings, monuments, or in special locations. Many markers outside the country have been written in the local languages such as French, German, and Spanish.

The Kudan, the Philippine embassy building in Tokyo, has been declared a national historical landmark by the NHCP and was granted a historical marker on March 3, 2014. It is the first and currently the only overseas site to be granted such status. During the unveiling of the marker, Ambassador Manuel Lopez called the building as the crown jewel of Philippine foreign service.

This article lists 47 markers outside the Philippines.

== Overseas markers ==
Marker title	Description	Location	Language	Date issued	Image
Apolinario Mabini (1854–1903)	Banished to Guam from 1901 with other Filipino political prisoners who were against the American rule.	Asan Point, Guam, United States	English	1964	
Apolinario Mabini (1854–1903)	Banished to Guam from 1901 with other Filipino political prisoners who were against the American rule.	Guam, United States	English		
The Arrival of Filipino Plantation Workers in Hawaii	They arrived on December 20, 1906. They were fifteen who came from Ilocos and the pioneer Filipino migrants in Hawaii.	Filipino Community Center, Waipahu, Hawaii, United States	English	September 16, 2006	
Dr. Jose Rizal		Acapulco, Mexico		January 11, 1998	
Dr. Jose Rizal	Where Rizal studied the local educational system and where he got famous for being an oculist.	Hong Kong, China	English		
Dr. Jose Rizal	Where Rizal began his annotation of Antonio de Morga's Sucesos de las Islas Filipinas.	London, United Kingdom	English		
Dr. Jose Rizal	House where he stayed from 1890 to 1891.	Madrid, Spain	Spanish		
Dr. Jose Rizal	House where he wrote the first chapters of Noli Me Tángere.	Paris	English		
Dr. Jose Rizal	Where he wrote the latter half of Noli Me Tángere.	Berlin	English		
Dr. Jose Rizal (1861–1896)	National hero of the Philippines, visited Chicago on May 11, 1888.	Filipino American Council of Chicago, Chicago, United States	English	1993	
Dr. Jose Rizal (1861–1896)	National hero of the Philippines, where Rizal stayed in Vienna.	Leopold Hof Building, Vienna, Austria	German	June 19, 1995	
Dr. Jose Rizal (1861–1896)	National hero of the Philippines, where he completed Noli Me Tángere.	Jägerstraße 71, Berlin, Germany	German	2003	
Dr. Jose Rizal (1861–1896)	Rizal visited the Niagara Falls on May 12, 1888.	Queen Victoria Park, Niagara Falls, Ontario	English	June 21, 2025	
Embahada ng Pilipinas; Fujimi, Chiyoda-Ku, Tokyo (Note: Embassy of the Philippines: Fujimi, Chiyoda-Ku, Tokyo)	Declared as a national historical landmark by the NHCP.	Chiyoda-ku, Tōkyō, Japan	Filipino (a Japanese translation is provided under)	March 3, 2014	
Embassy of the Philippines; Tokyo	Building purchased by Jose P. Laurel for the Philippines.	Chiyoda-ku, Tōkyō, Japan	English	March 9, 1962	
Hommage	Commemorating the gathering of Filipino intellectuals and patriots who gathered at the studio of Juan Luna.	Masson Daniel, 65 Boulevard Arago, Paris, France	French	1987	
Jose P. Laurel		Nara, Japan		March 9, 1969	
Jose Protacio Rizal (1861–1896)	National hero of the Philippines. Martyred on December 30, 1896.	Columbus Drive, Jersey City, New Jersey	English	October 24, 2000	
Jose Rizal; 1861–1896	José Rizal (1861–1896), national hero of the Philippines, lived in this house in 1889. It was here that he wrote books and articles that stirred the Filipino national spirit.	45 rue de Maubeuge, 9me arrondissement, Paris, France	French	1959	
Jose Rizal	National hero of the Philippines. House where he wrote El Filibusterismo.	42 Rue Philippe de Champagne, Brussels, Belgium	French	2007	
Jose Rizal	National hero of the Philippines. The living soul of the Philippine Revolution.	Rosemeadow, Campbelltown, New South Wales, Australia	English	October 26, 2012	
Jose Rizal	National hero of the Philippines. Martyred on December 30, 1896.	Cherry Hill, New Jersey, USA	English	November 17, 2018	
Jose Rizal (1861–1896)		Brussels, Belgium		June 12, 1998	
Jose Rizal (1861–1896)		Brasilia, Brazil		June 12, 1998	
Jose Rizal (1861–1896)		Havana, Cuba		June 12, 1998	
Jose Rizal (1861–1896)		Madrid, Spain		June 12, 1998	
Jose Rizal (1861–1896)		Ottawa, Canada		June 12, 1998	
Jose Rizal (1861–1896)		Port Moresby, Papua New Guinea		June 12, 1998	
Jose Rizal (1861–1896)		Stockholm, Sweden		June 12, 1998	
Jose Rizal (1861–1896)		Riyadh, Saudi Arabia		June 12, 1998	
Jose Rizal (1861–1896)		Roppongi, Tōkyō, Japan		June 12, 1998	
Jose Rizal (1861–1896)		Vatican		June 12, 1998	
Jose Rizal (1861–1896)	National hero of the Philippines.	Carson International Sculpture Garden, 801 E. Carson Street, Carson, California, United States	English	September 29, 2012	
Jose Rizal (1861–1896)	National hero of the Philippines.	Nose Creek Regional Park, Airdrie, Alberta, Canada	English	June 19, 2022	
Jose Rizal (1861–1896)	National hero of the Philippines.	Earl Bales Park, Toronto, Ontario, Canada	English	June 22, 2022	
Jose Rizal; 1861–1896	National hero of the Philippines.	Rizal Monument, Cooper River Park, Camden County, Cherry Hill, New Jersey, USA	English	November 17, 2023	
José Rizal; 1861–1896	National hero of the Philippines, marking the house where Rizal wrote the final parts of Noli Me Tángere.	Wilhelmsfeld, Germany	German	January 4, 1960	
José Rizal; 1861–1896	National hero of the Philippines, ophthalmology clinic of Rizal in Paris.	124 rue de Rennes, 6th arrondissement, Paris, France	French	1959	
José Rizal; 1861–1896	National hero of the Philippines, where Rizal lived when he published the Fili.	Henegouwenstraat 9, Ghent, Belgium	French	1959	
Jose Rizal (1861–1896)		Dr. Jose Rizal Way cor. Old Commonwealth Path, Winnipeg, Manitoba, Canada	English	June 19, 2025	
Jose Rizal; 1861–1896		Dr. Jose P. Rizal Park, Sarno Road, Brampton, Ontario, Canada	English	June 20, 2025	
José Rizal; 1861–1896	National hero of the Philippines, where Rizal lived when he published the Fili.	Lange Kruissaraat 25, 9000, Ghent, Belgium	Dutch	September 19, 2026	
Old Chancery of the Embassy of the Republic of the Philippines in the United States	Built under the designs of Appleton Prentis Clark Jr. Bought by the Philippine Commonwealth through the efforts of Joaquin Elizalde from 1941 to 1946.	Old Philippine Embassy Chancery, 1617 Massachusetts Avenue NW Washington DC, United States	Filipino, English	November 9, 2018	
Paduka Batara	King of Sulu who died in Dezhou. He travelled to China in 1417 to pay tribute to Emperor Yongle.	Dezhou, China	English	May 23, 1999	
Philippine Ambassador's Residence in the United States	Built by William Lipscomb for General and Charles and Emma Fitzhugh.	2253 R Street Northwest, Washington D.C., United States	English	June 13, 2022	
The Philippine National Flag	Where the first flag was sewn by Marcela Mariño Agoncillo and her companions Lorenza Agoncillo and Delfina Herbosa Natividad. First hoisted during the Battle of Alapan.	Morrison Hill, Hong Kong, China		May 28, 1998	
Sewing of the First National Flag		Hong Kong, China		1998	

== See also ==
- List of historical markers of the Philippines

== Bibliography ==
- National Historical Institute (2008). Historical Markers (1992–2006). National Historical Institute.
- A list of sites and structures with historical markers, as of 16 January 2012
- A list of institutions with historical markers, as of 16 January 2012
