= Emma S. Fitzhugh House =

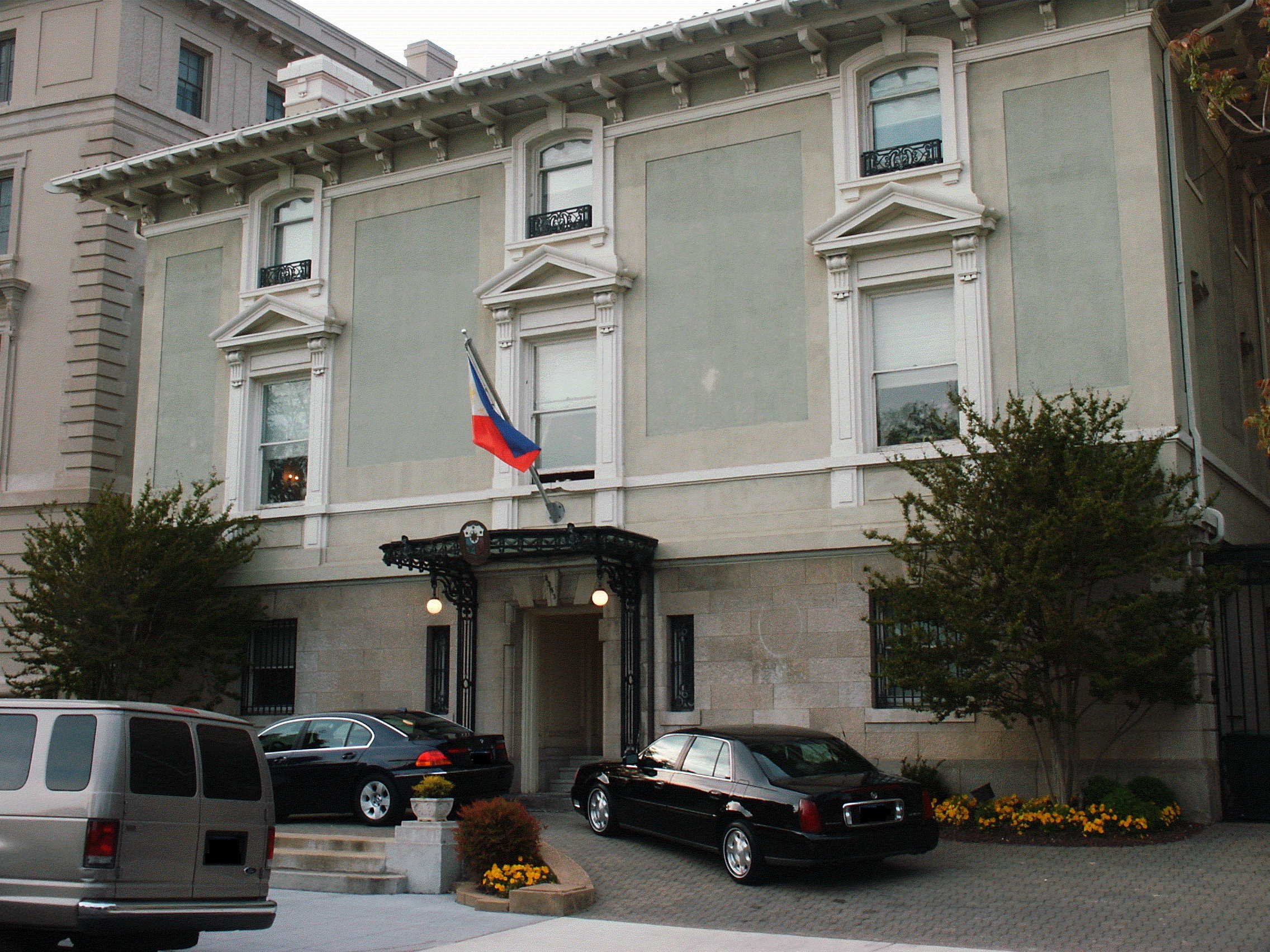
- Interactive map of the Emma S. Fitzhugh House area

General information
- Status: Completed
- Architectural style: Spanish Renaissance–Baroque / Mediterranean Revival
- Location: 2253 R Street Northwest, Washington D.C., United States
- Coordinates: 38°54′46.1″N 77°03′02.7″W
- Current tenants: Philippine ambassador to the United States
- Completed: 1904
- Owner: Fitzhugh family (1904–1941); Britten family (1941–1946); Elizalde family (1946–1949); Philippine government (1949–)

Design and construction
- Architect: Waddy B. Wood
- Architecture firm: Wood, Donn and Dunning
- Developer: William Lipscombs & Co.

National Historical Landmarks
- Official name: Philippine Ambassador’s Residence In The United States
- Type: Buildings/Structures
- Designated: June 13, 2022; 4 years ago
- Database: NHCP website

The Emma S. Fitzhugh House is a historic mansion in Washington D.C., United States. It serves as the official residence of the Philippine ambassador to the United States.

== History ==
The house was built in 1904 by William Lipscombs & Co. for Charles L. Fitzhugh and his wife Emma S. Fitzhugh and was designed by Waddy B. Wood under the firm, Wood, Donn and Dunning. In 1913, then Resident Commissioner (and later President of the Philippine Commonwealth) Manuel L. Quezon visited the house.

The Fitzhugh house also had Clarence M. Wooley, Sherman Flint and the Czechoslovak Legation as its tenants. In 1931, Republican Illinois 9th district Representative Frederick Britten and his wife took residence in the house. The Brittens continued living in the house even after Congressman Britten's retirement from politics. The Brittens bought the house on June 19, 1941 from Emma S. Fitzhugh.

The house was acquired by Joaquin Elizalde, the first Philippine ambassador to the United States, on October 14, 1946. Three years later, on August 30, the Philippine government bought the house from the Elizalde family and made the building the official residence of Philippine ambassador to the United States succeeding Elizalde.

== Heritage designation ==
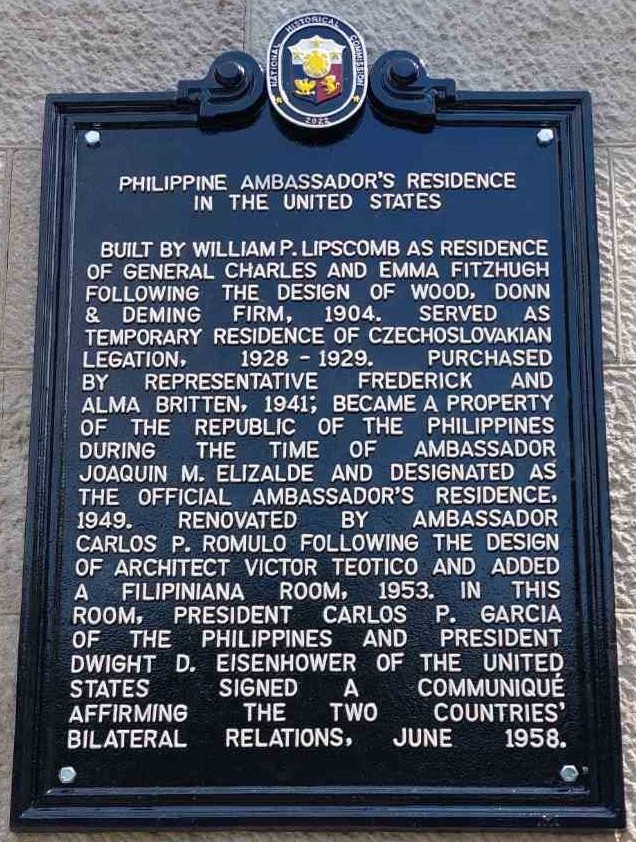
Historical marker installed in 2021

In June 2021, the historical markers for the house from the National Historical Commission of the Philippines was unveiled marking the 75th anniversary of the formal establishment of the Philippines–United States relations. The English marker was officially installed on the residence's facade on June 13, 2022.

== See also ==
- Embassy of the Philippines, Washington, D.C.
- Kudan House
