= List of ambassadors of the Philippines to Japan =

Ambassador of the Republic of the Philippines to Japan
- Sugo ng Republika ng Pilipinas sa Hapon 駐日フィリピン共和国大使; Chūnichi Firipin Kyōwakoku Taishi
- Seal of the Department of Foreign Affairs of the Philippines

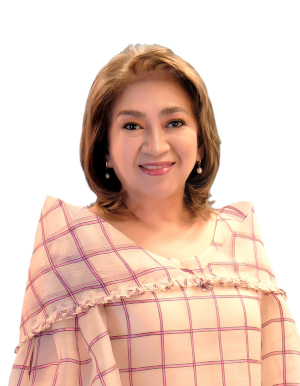
- Incumbent; Mylene Garcia-Albano since 12 August 2022
- Department of Foreign Affairs; Embassy of the Philippines, Tokyo
- Style: Her Excellency
- Reports to: Department of Foreign Affairs
- Residence: The Kudan
- Seat: Chome-15-5, Roppongi, Minato City, Tokyo, Japan
- Nominator: Secretary of Foreign Affairs
- Appointer: President of the Philippines; with the advice and consent of the Commission on Appointments
- Term length: No fixed term
- Inaugural holder: Jorge B. Vargas
- Formation: 14 October 1943
- Website: Philippine Embassy, Tokyo

The ambassador of the Philippines to Japan (Filipino: Sugo ng Republika ng Pilipinas sa Hapon; Japanese: 駐日フィリピン共和国大使, romanized: Chūnichi Firipin Kyōwakoku Taishi) is the Republic of the Philippines' foremost diplomatic representative in the State of Japan. As officer of the Philippine Department of Foreign Affairs, the head of the embassy, and the head of the Philippines' diplomatic mission there, the ambassador is the official representative of the president and the government of the Philippines to the emperor and government of Japan. The position has the rank and status of an ambassador extraordinary and plenipotentiary.

The ambassador is based at the embassy at 5 Chome-15-5, Roppongi, Minato City, Tokyo, Japan, and resides in The Kudan, located at 1-1-1 Fujimi, Chiyoda-ku, Tokyo, Japan.

The position is currently held by Mylene Garcia-Albano, who has been in office since 12 August 2022.

== History ==
The diplomatic relations between the two countries were established on 14 October 1943, following the inauguration of the Second Republic under the administration of President Jose P. Laurel and amid the Second World War. Jorge B. Vargas, who had previously served as President Manuel L. Quezon's Secretary of National Defense and Executive Secretary, was appointed ambassador to the Empire of Japan after he declined to assume the Presidency under the Japanese occupation.

Following the defeat of Japan on 2 September 1945, relations were suspended and the post of the Philippine ambassador to the Japanese mainland became dormant until 1952 since the relations and credentials were redirected to the Supreme Commander for the Allied Powers in occupied Japan. In October 1952, the Japanese embassy in Manila was reestablished, according to the Treaty of San Francisco that was signed on 8 September 1951, which would serve as a formal conclusion of the Second World War. On 23 July 1956, right after the ratification of the Peace Treaty and Reparations Agreement between the Philippines and Japan (signed on 9 May 1956), the diplomatic relations between the two countries were fully reinstated, and the post of the Philippine ambassador to the Japanese mainland was re-established.

== List of ambassadors to Japan ==
Image	Ambassador	Tenure	Japanese emperor	Japanese prime minister	Philippine president	Note(s)
	Jorge B. Vargas	1943–1945	Hirohito	Hideki Tojo; Kuniaki Koiso; Kantarō Suzuki; Naruhiko Higashikuni; Kijūrō Shidehara	Jose P. Laurel	
Diplomatic relations were suspended after the Surrender of Japan to the Allied Powers on 2 September 1945, and the post remained closed until 1952, but no ambassador was posted until the re-establishment of bilateral relations on 23 July 1956.
	Felino Neri	1956–1958	Hirohito	Tanzan Ishibashi; Nobusuke Kishi	Ramon Magsaysay; Carlos P. Garcia	
	Manuel A. Adeva	1958–1962	Hirohito	Nobusuke Kishi; Hayato Ikeda	Carlos P. Garcia; Diosdado Macapagal	
	Mauro Mendez	1962–1964	Hirohito	Hayato Ikeda; Eisaku Satō	Diosdado Macapagal	
	Jacinto C. Borja	1965–1966	Hirohito	Eisaku Satō; Kakuei Tanaka; Takeo Miki; Takeo Fukuda; Masayoshi Ōhira; Masayoshi Ito; Zenkō Suzuki; Yasuhiro Nakasone	Diosdado Macapagal; Ferdinand Marcos	
	Jose S. Laurel III	1966–1971	Hirohito	Eisaku Satō; Kakuei Tanaka; Takeo Miki; Takeo Fukuda; Masayoshi Ōhira; Masayoshi Ito; Zenkō Suzuki; Yasuhiro Nakasone	Ferdinand Marcos	
	Roberto S. Benedicto	1972–1978	Hirohito	Eisaku Satō; Kakuei Tanaka; Takeo Miki; Takeo Fukuda; Masayoshi Ōhira; Masayoshi Ito; Zenkō Suzuki; Yasuhiro Nakasone	Ferdinand Marcos	
	Carlos J. Valdez	1978–1986	Hirohito	Eisaku Satō; Kakuei Tanaka; Takeo Miki; Takeo Fukuda; Masayoshi Ōhira; Masayoshi Ito; Zenkō Suzuki; Yasuhiro Nakasone	Ferdinand Marcos	
	Ramon V. Del Rosario	1986–1992	Hirohito; Akihito	Yasuhiro Nakasone; Noboru Takeshita; Sōsuke Uno; Toshiki Kaifu; Kiichi Miyazawa	Corazon C. Aquino; Fidel V. Ramos	One of the Philippine representatives that served as mourners at the funeral ceremony of Emperor Hirohito.
	Domingo L. Siazon, Jr.	1993–1995	Akihito	Kiichi Miyazawa; Morihiro Hosokawa; Tsutomu Hata; Tomiichi Murayama	Fidel V. Ramos; Joseph Estrada	First term.
	Alfonso Yuchengco	1995–1998	Akihito	Tomiichi Murayama; Ryūtarō Hashimoto; Keizō Obuchi	Fidel V. Ramos; Joseph Estrada	
	Romeo A. Arguelles	1998–2001	Akihito	Keizō Obuchi; Yoshirō Mori; Junichirō Koizumi	Joseph Estrada; Gloria Macapagal-Arroyo	
	Domingo L. Siazon, Jr.	2001–2010	Akihito	Junichirō Koizumi; Shinzō Abe; Yasuo Fukuda; Tarō Asō; Yukio Hatoyama; Naoto Kan	Gloria Macapagal-Arroyo; Benigno Aquino III	Second term.
	Manuel M. Lopez	2011–2016	Akihito	Naoto Kan; Yoshihiko Noda; Shinzō Abe	Benigno Aquino III; Rodrigo Duterte	Credentials were presented to Emperor Akihito on 7 April 2011.
	Jose C. Laurel V	2017–2022	Akihito; Naruhito	Shinzō Abe; Yoshihide Suga; Fumio Kishida	Rodrigo Duterte; Bongbong Marcos	Son of former ambassador to Japan from 1966 to 1971, Jose S. Laurel III. Credentials were presented to Emperor Akihito on 9 June 2017.
	Robespierre L. Bolivar	2022	Naruhito	Fumio Kishida; Shigeru Ishiba; Sanae Takaichi	Bongbong Marcos	Briefly served as the Philippine ambassador (in the capacity of Chargé d’Affaires) to Japan from 1 July 2022 to 12 August 2022.
	Mylene Garcia-Albano	2022–present	Naruhito	Fumio Kishida; Shigeru Ishiba; Sanae Takaichi	Bongbong Marcos	Appointed by President Marcos Jr. on August 12, 2022. Credentials were presented to Emperor Naruhito on 19 April 2023.

== See also ==
- Japan–Philippines relations
- List of ambassadors of Japan to the Philippines
- The Kudan
- Foreign relations of the Philippines
- Foreign relations of Japan
