= Japan–Philippines relations =

- Japan: Philippines

Diplomatic mission
- Japanese Embassy, Manila: Philippine Embassy, Tokyo

Envoy
- Ambassador Kazuya Endo: Ambassador Mylene Garcia-Albano

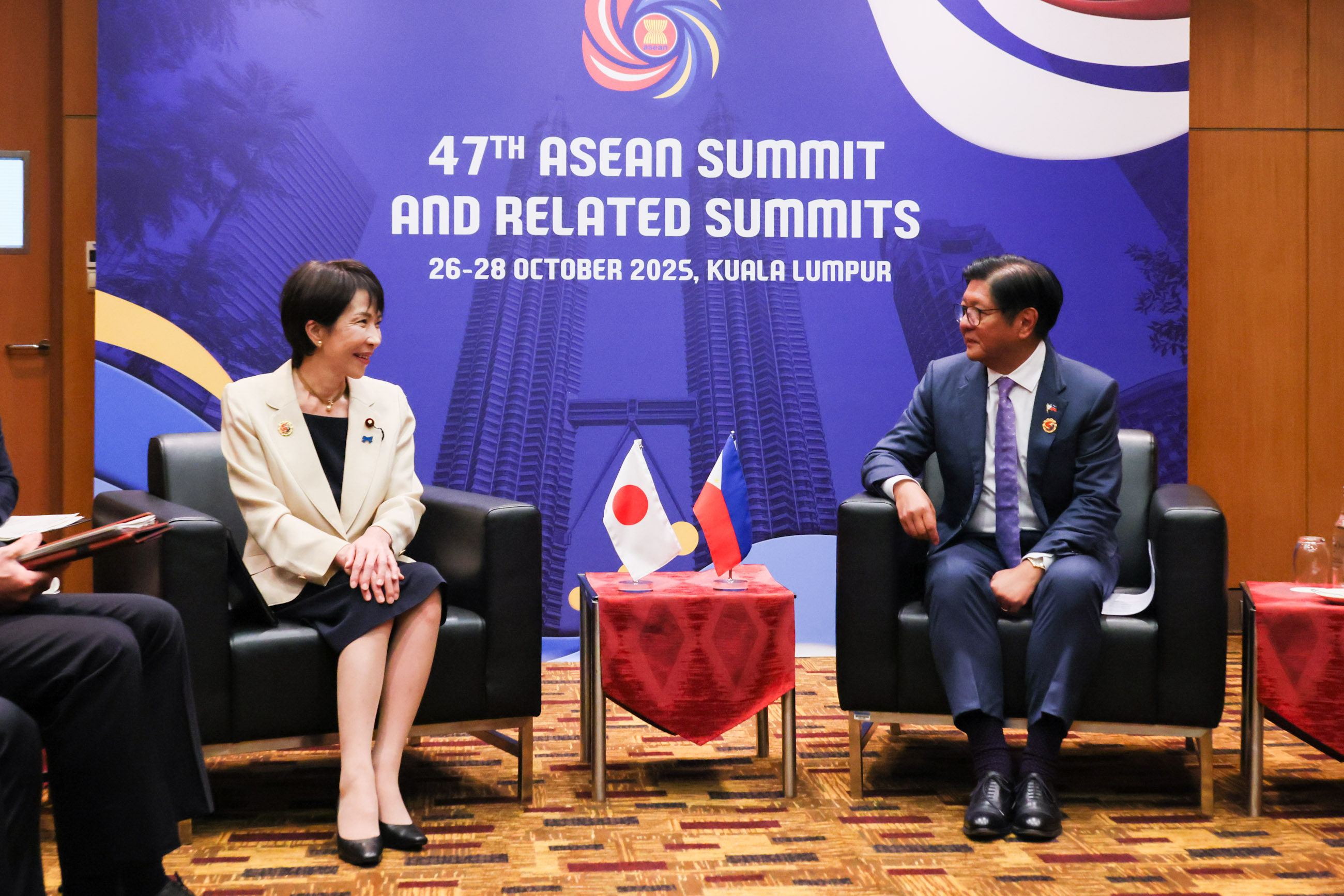
Japanese Prime Minister Sanae Takaichi meets with Philippine President Bongbong Marcos during the 47th ASEAN Summit in Kuala Lumpur, 25 October 2025

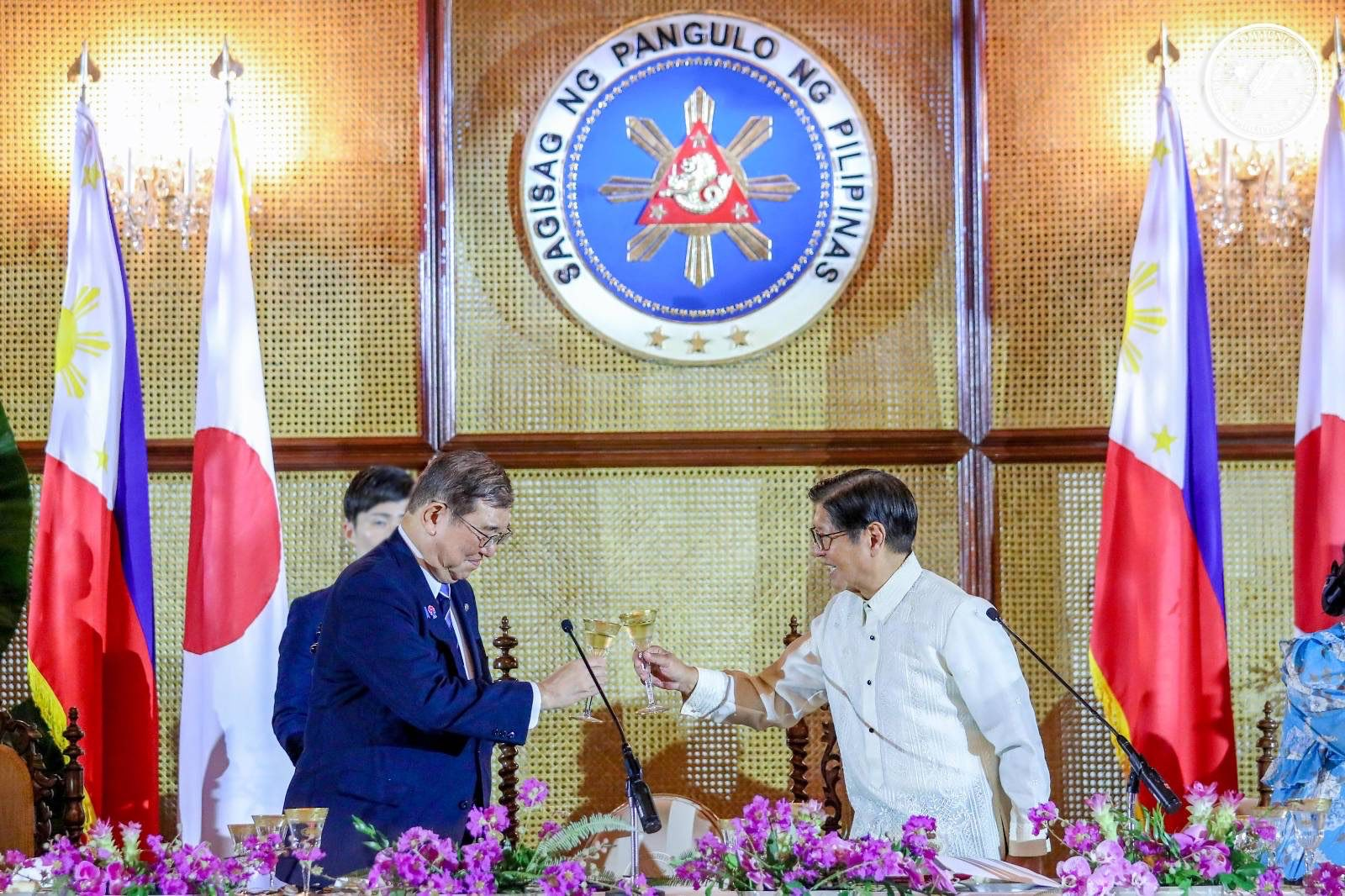
Philippine President Bongbong Marcos hosts a state dinner for Japanese Prime Minister Shigeru Ishiba at Malacañang Palace, Manila, 29 April 2025

Japan–Philippines relations (Japanese: 日本とフィリピンの関係, romanized: Nihon to Firipin no kankei; Filipino: Ugnayang Hapon at Pilipinas) span a period from before the 16th century to the present.

Results of 2013 Pew Research Center poll Asia/Pacific views of Japan by country (sorted by fav − unfav)
Country polled	Positive	Negative	Neutral	Pos − Neg
China	4%	90%	6	-86
South Korea	22%	77%	1	-55
Pakistan	51%	7%	42	44
Philippines	78%	18%	4	60
Australia	78%	16%	6	62
Indonesia	79%	12%	9	67
Malaysia	80%	6%	14	74

Results of 2011 BBC World Service poll Views of Japan's influence by country (sorted by pos − neg)
Country polled	Positive	Negative	Neutral	Pos − Neg
China	18%	71%	11	-53
Mexico	24%	34%	42	-10
Pakistan	34%	15%	51	19
South Africa	41%	17%	42	24
India	39%	13%	48	26
France	55%	29%	16	26
Portugal	43%	13%	44	30
United Kingdom	58%	26%	16	32
Germany	58%	25%	17	33
Ghana	55%	11%	34	34
Australia	60%	26%	14	34
Spain	57%	19%	24	38
Egypt	52%	14%	34	38
Kenya	61%	20%	19	41
Turkey	64%	21%	15	43
South Korea	68%	20%	12	48
Italy	66%	18%	16	48
Brazil	66%	16%	18	50
Nigeria	65%	14%	21	51
Canada	67%	16%	17	51
United States	69%	18%	13	51
Chile	66%	14%	20	52
Peru	64%	10%	26	54
Russia	65%	7%	28	58
Philippines	84%	12%	4	72
Indonesia	85%	7%	8	78

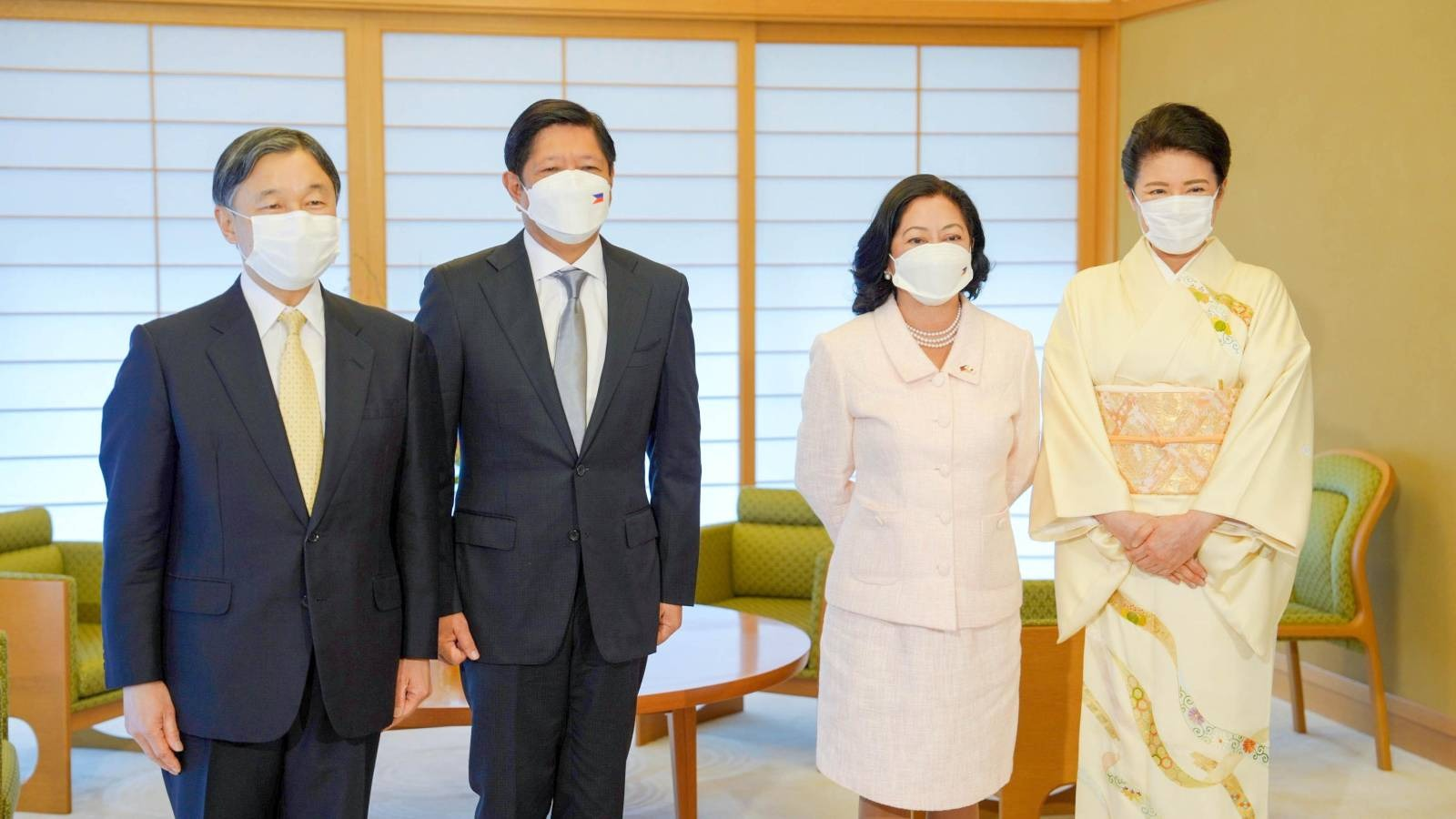
Japanese Emperor Naruhito and Empress Masako meeting with Philippine President Bongbong Marcos and First Lady Liza Araneta Marcos at the Imperial Palace, Tokyo, 9 February 2023

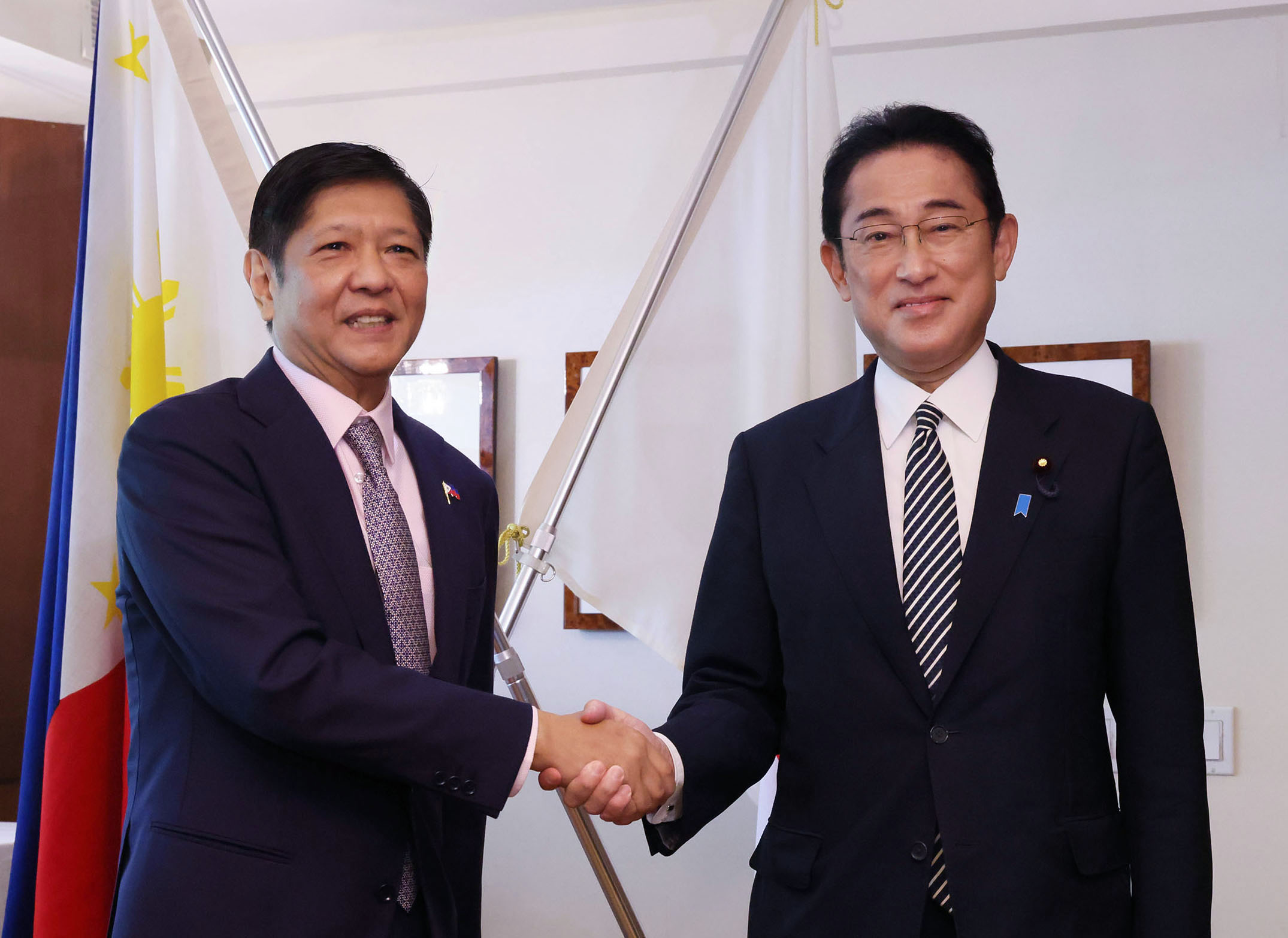
Japanese Prime Minister Fumio Kishida held talks with Philippine President Bongbong Marcos after the 10th High-Level Meeting of the Friends of CTBT (Comprehensive Nuclear-Test-Ban Treaty) Summit, September 21, 2022

== History ==
=== Early history ===
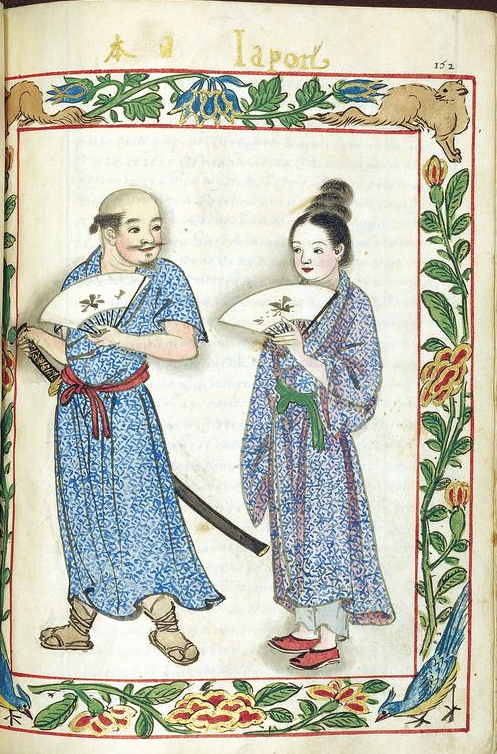
Illustration of Japanese produced in the Philippines, c. 1590 Boxer Codex

Relations between Japan and pre-Hispanic polities in the Philippines date back to at least the precolonial period of Filipino history or the Muromachi period of Japanese history. Austronesian speakers presumably from the Philippines and Taiwan, known as the Hayato and Kumaso, were immigrants to Japan and even served in the Imperial Court. These Austronesians are theorised to have had Native American ancestry as Native Americans and Austronesians interacted with each other in the spread of the sweet potato to the Pacific even before the Spanish colonisation. The sweet potato possibly even reached Japan through this connection.

Mishima ware imported from Luzon were also traded in Japan. These were especially sourced from the pre-Hispanic polities of Tondo, Manila, and Pangasinan in Luzon through trade with Japan. Likewise, the natives of the Philippines helped shelter Japanese merchants and traders in northern Luzon in 1440, while 20 Japanese traders were also recorded in Manila by 1517. In 1580, while Filipino natives were helping Japanese sailors, a Japanese pirate named Tayfusa colonized parts of Cagayan in northern Luzon, establishing his own kingdom. In 1582, the Spanish arrived in Cagayan to colonize it for themselves. This led to the 1582 Cagayan battles, which resulted to the expulsion of Tayfusa's forces.

Around 1600, the area of Dilao, a district of Manila, was a Nihonmachi of around 3,000 Japanese or Filipinos with Japanese descent. The place name probably originated from the Tagalog term diláw meaning 'yellow', which describes their general physiognomy. The Japanese had established quite early an enclave at Dilao where they numbered between 300 and 400 in 1593. In 1603, during the Sangley rebellion, they numbered 1,500, and 3,000 in 1606. In the 16th and 17th centuries, thousands of Japanese people traders also migrated to the Philippines and assimilated into the local population. pp. 52–3

In 1593, Spanish authorities in Manila authorized the dispatch of Franciscan missionaries to Japan. The Franciscan friar Luis Sotelo was involved in the support of the Dilao enclave between 1600 and 1608.

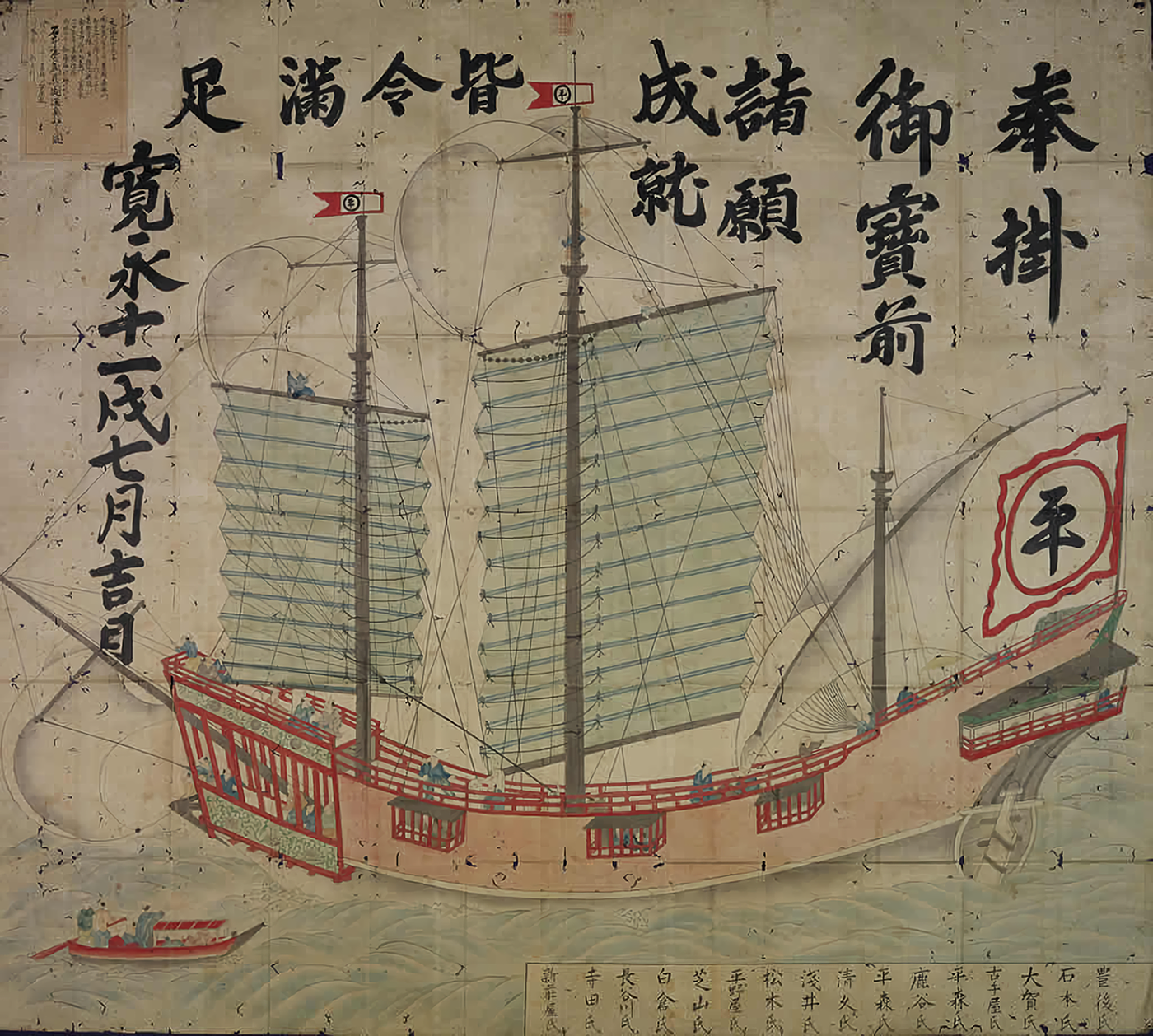
A 1634 Japanese Red seal ship. Tokyo Naval Science Museum.

In the first half of the 17th century, intense official trade took place between the two countries, through the Red seal ships system. Thirty official "Red seal ship" passports were issued between Japan and the Philippines between 1604 and 1616.

The Japanese led an abortive rebellion in Dilao against the Spanish Empire in 1606–1607, but their numbers rose again until the interdiction of Christianity under the shōgun Tokugawa Ieyasu in 1614, when 300 Japanese Christian refugees under Takayama Ukon settled in the Philippines. On 8 November 1614, together with 300 Japanese Christians, Takayama Ukon left his home country from Nagasaki. He arrived at Manila on 21 December and was greeted warmly by the Spanish Jesuits and the local Filipinos there. The Spanish Philippines offered its assistance in overthrowing the Japanese government by invasion to protect Japanese Catholics. Justo declined to participate and died of illness just 40 days afterward. These 17th-century immigrants are at the origin of some of today's 200,000-strong Japanese population in the Philippines.

More rebellions such as the 1587 Tondo Conspiracy led by Filipino nobles against Spain, had Japanese merchants and Christians involved, but the plot was crushed. Toyotomi Hideyoshi threatened the Spanish to leave or face full scale Japanese invasion, however, this was near his decline and death. The Tokugawa Shogunate rose in power right after.

In 1633 and 1635, Japan established an isolationist (sakoku) policy, and contacts between the two nations were severed until after the opening of Japan in 1854. In the 16th and 17th centuries, thousands of Japanese traders also migrated to the Philippines and assimilated into the local population. In 1888, Filipino nationalist José Rizal arrived in Japan and had a relationship with Seiko Usui (Osei-san), a daughter of a samurai.

In 2009, Japanese and Filipino archaeologists from the Sumitomo Foundation-funded Boljoon Archaeological Project conducted by the University of San Carlos with the National Museum of the Philippines, discovered ancient Japanese pottery that has been believed to have been in existence since the early 1700s. The unearthed Japanese pottery was evidence of economic activity between Japan and Cebu dating as far back as the 16th century.

=== Philippines and the Empire of Japan ===
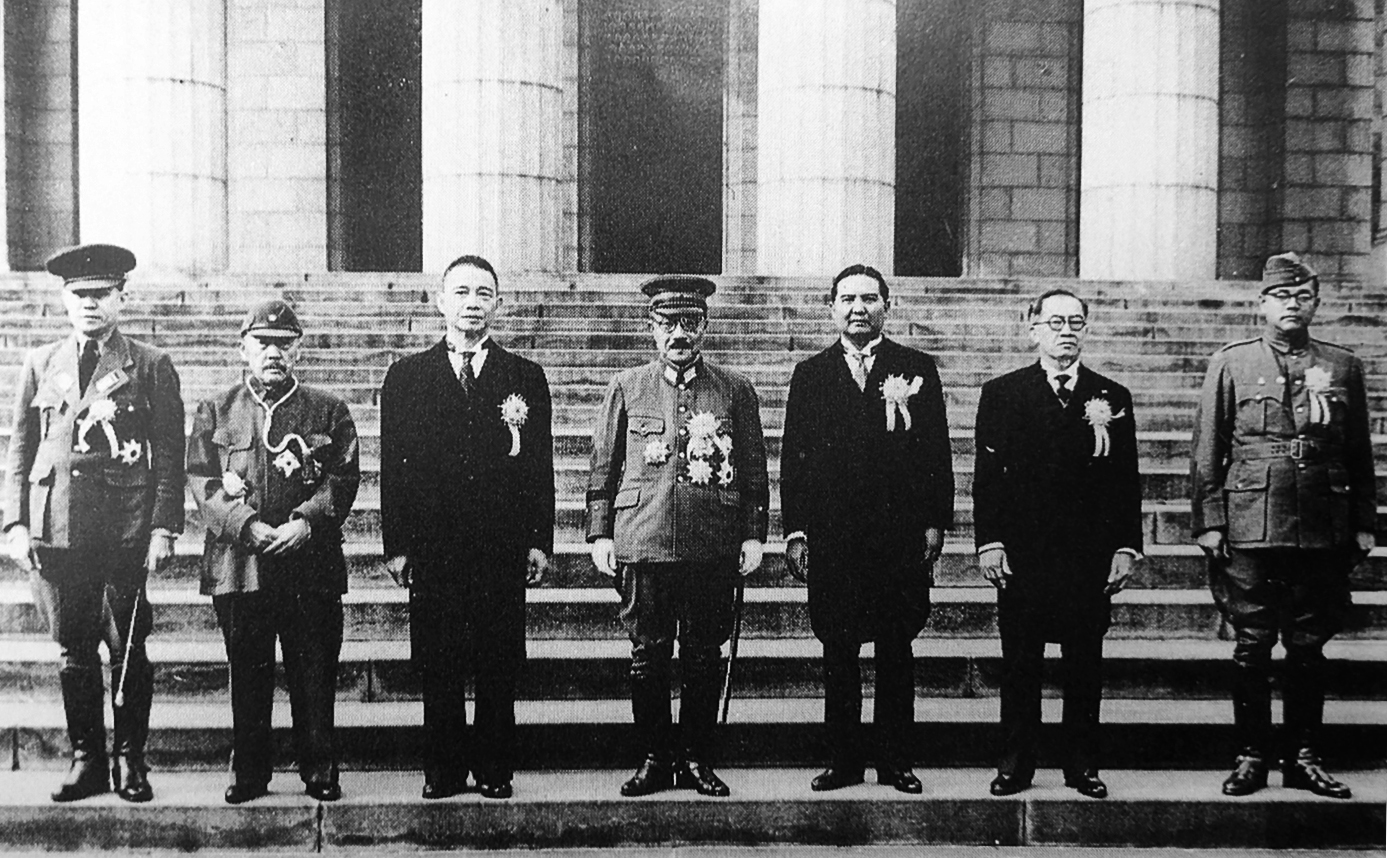
Greater East Asia Conference in Tokyo, 1943 which was both attended by Japanese Prime Minister Hideki Tōjō (fourth from left) and Philippine President Jose P. Laurel (second from right).

In 1875, the Meiji Emperor sent an economic mission to resume normal trade between the Empire of Japan and Spanish Philippines. Thirteen years later, he ordered the establishing of a Japanese consulate based in Manila, with Umekichi Yatabe was the first Japanese consul.

According to the Spanish diplomat F.E. Reynoso, in 1894 the Japanese offered to buy the Philippines from Spain for 40 million pounds sterling. However, according to Reynoso this offer was not accepted. According to the scholar C.E. Russell, in 1896 Spain was rumoured to have offered to sell the colony to Japan for $3,000,000 gold dollars, but this offer was rejected.

During the 1896 revolution against Spanish colonial rule, some Filipino insurgents (especially the Katipunan) sought assistance from the Japanese government. The Katipunan sought to send a delegate to the Meiji Emperor to solicit financial and military aid in May 1896. The beginning of the uprising coincided with a visit to Manila by the Japanese warship Kongō, and the leadership approached the captain of the ship in an attempt to buy arms from Japan, but no deal was made. Nevertheless, despite no official support from the Japanese government, there were still individual Japanese citizens who joined in the Philippine Revolution against Spain and the Philippine-American War.

The Meiji government of Japan was unwilling and unable to provide any official support. However, Japanese supporters of Philippine independence in the Pan-Asian movement raised funds and sent weapons on the privately charted Nunobiki Maru, which sank before reaching its destination. However, the Japanese government officially acquiesced to American colonial rule over the Philippines, as ratified by the Taft–Katsura Agreement of 1905. Under the American-backed Insular Government, Japanese economic ties to the Philippines expanded tremendously and by 1929, Japan was the largest trading partner of the Philippines after the United States. Economic investment was accompanied by large-scale immigration of Japanese to the Philippines, mainly merchants, gardeners and prostitutes ('karayuki-san'). Davao that time had over 20,000 ethnic Japanese residents. In Baguio, Japanese workers represented about 22% of the workforce that constructed Benguet Road (later renamed Kennon Road), so that Baguio later had a significant Japanese population. By 1935, it was estimated that Japanese immigrants dominated 35% of Philippine retail trade. Investments included extensive agricultural holdings and natural resource development. By 1940, some 40% of Philippine exports to Japan were iron, copper, manganese and chrome.

When it comes to the Philippine importation of electrical machineries and appliances, Japan was tied with China for the 2nd-largest supplier of such products, both trailing behind the United States.

In the Commonwealth Era, the Japanese Ministry of Foreign Affairs along with their representatives in the Philippines assessed that since the main purpose of the Commonwealth inaugurated was to establish a transition period towards their independence from the Americans, Japan thought that the majority of the Filipinos would already not turn to them, asking for assistance or aid to attain independence. Even more, the scent of conspicuousness is at its peak due to their economic presence in the country would be detrimental in establishing sincerity and friendship with the Filipinos since they are becoming more wary.

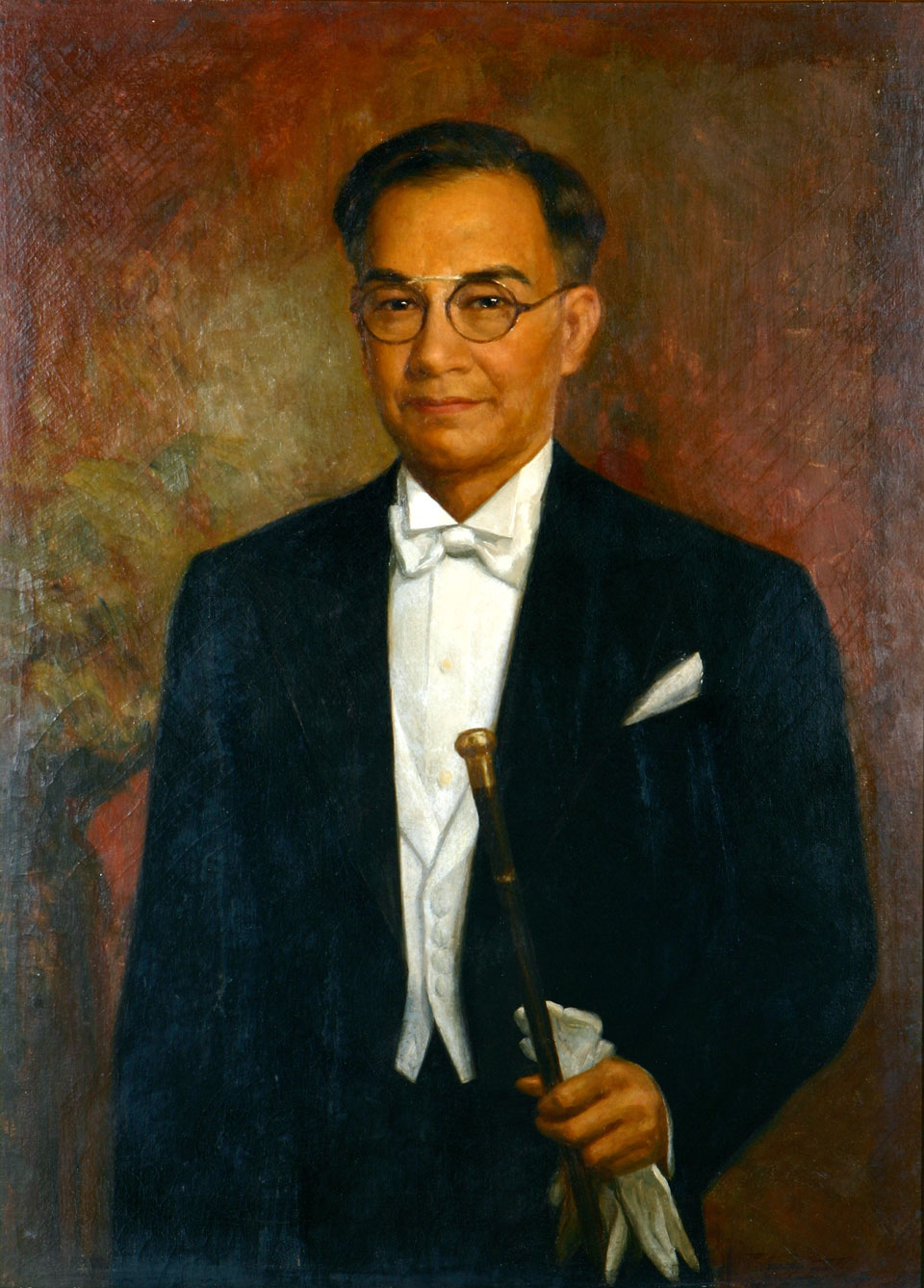
Jose P. Laurel, President of the Japanese-occupied Second Philippine Republic, from 1943 to 1945.

During World War II, immediately after the attack on Pearl Harbor, Japanese forces invaded and quickly overcame resistance by the United States and Philippine Commonwealth military. Strategically, Japan needed the Philippines to prevent its use by Allied forces as a forward base of operations against the Japanese home islands, and against its plans for the further conquest of Southeast Asia. In 1943, a puppet government, the Second Philippine Republic, was established, but gained little popular support, primarily due to the Imperial Japanese Army's brutal conduct towards the Philippine civilian population. During the course of the Japanese occupation, and subsequent battles during the American and Filipino re-invasion, an estimated one million Filipinos died, giving rise to lingering anti-Japanese sentiment. More than a thousand Filipino "comfort women", composed of mothers, girls, and gay men, were forcibly taken by Japan to serve at their sex slave camps during the occupation.

The Japanese also sent "doctors" and "surgeons" to the Philippines, who performed human experimentation on native Filipinos. Some of these experiments included amputations, dissections, and suturing blood vessels of live humans. Surgeons gruesomely performed vivisections on Filipinos. The Japanese were also known to have killed Filipino infants as an act of entertainment and stress-reliever. Cannibalism was also conducted by the Japanese on the remains of murdered civilian Filipinos during and after the occupation.

Hundreds of heritage cities and towns throughout the country lay in ruins due to intentional fire and kamikaze tactics imposed by the Japanese and bombings imposed by the Americans. Only a single heritage town, Vigan, survived. The government of the Empire of Japan never gave any compensation for the restoration of Filipino heritage towns and cities, while the United States only gave minimal funding for two cities, Manila and Baguio. A decade after the war, the heritage landscape of the Philippines was never restored due to a devastated economy, lack of funding, and lack of cultural experts during the time. The heritage zones were effectively replaced by old shanty houses and cement houses with cheap plywood or galvanized iron as roofs. According to a United States analysis released years after the war, U.S. casualties were 10,380 dead and 36,550 wounded; Japanese dead were 255,795. Filipino deaths, on the other hand, have not been officially tallied but was estimated to be more than one million, an astounding percentage of the national population at the time. The Philippine population decreased continuously for the next 5 years due to the spread of diseases and the lack of basic needs, far from Filipino lifestyle prior to the war where the country used to be the second richest in Asia, ironically, next only to Japan.

After the war, then General Douglas MacArthur decided to withhold information about Japan's human experimentation from the war crimes tribunal in the interest of improving of American-Japanese relations amid the growing threat of communism. This prevented persecution of the Japanese doctors involved. The United States afterwards received human experimentation data from Japan in exchange for MacArthur's actions.

=== Post-war relations ===
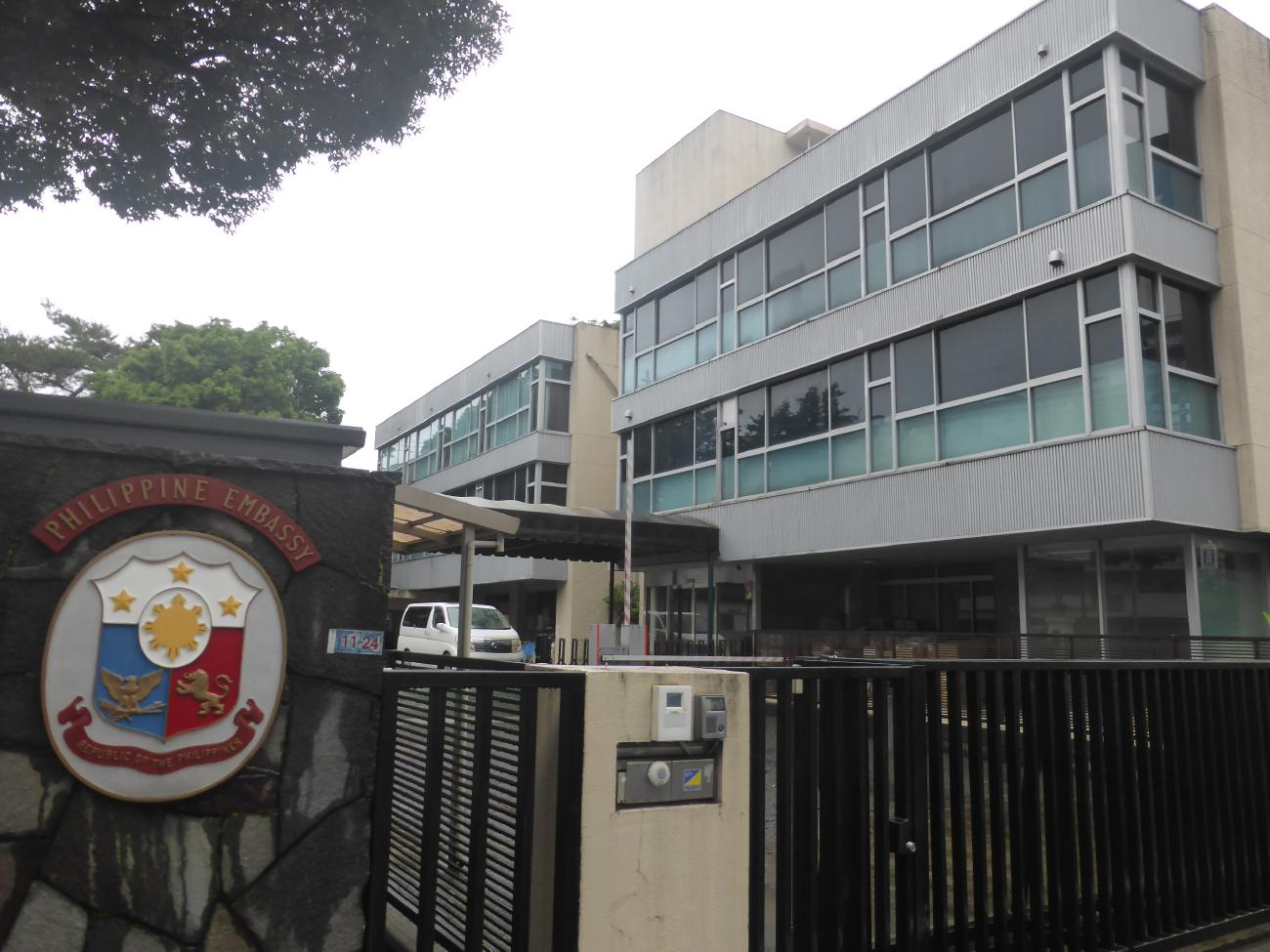
Embassy of the Philippines in Japan

The Philippines was granted independence in 1946, and was a signatory to the 1951 San Francisco Peace Treaty with Japan. The two countries had a long, protracted process about postwar reparations before formalizing diplomatic relations. As detailed in the Japanese Instrument of Surrender, the authority of the Japanese Emperor and Japanese government was subjected to Supreme Commander for the Allied Powers (SCAP) Douglas MacArthur. The Far Eastern Commission (FEC) was also formed. It was a body composed of Allied members tasked with formulating the policies of occupied Japan which would be enforced by the SCAP. Carlos P. Romulo represented the Philippines in this body.

Japan entered into negotiations with several countries for postwar reparations. The US policy was to have Japan pay for reparations in the form of goods or existing capital equipment and facilities. According to the US Department of State, this was to ensure Japan could continue its demilitarization process, as these were not necessary neither for the occupation forces nor for a peaceful Japanese economy. The United States sought to form the Inter-Allied Reparations Committee which would focus on policies for reparations. However, as this involved the contested territories of Manchuria, Sakhalin and the Kuril Islands, the then-Soviet Union opted to veto. In 1947, the US again pushed this agenda with the Advance Reparations Transfer Program, which would focus on early reparations for four countries, chosen for their stance against Imperial Japan and their assistance to the United States. These were, namely: the Philippines, China, Holland (representing Indonesia) and Great Britain (representing Burma and Malaysia).

The discussion of reparations took an abrupt turn due to the intensifying spread of communism in Greece and Turkey during the Cold War. This prompted the move of the United States to pursue the Containment Policy, aimed at stopping the spread of communism worldwide. One of the advocates of the Containment Policy, George F. Kennan, suggested the immediate rehabilitation of Japan's industrial and military capacity in order to best assist the US in countering communism in Asia. This ran counter to the initial position of the United States in regards to reparations, but after Mao Zedong took control of China and the onset of the Korean War, Japan was directly exposed to the threat.

The United States sent survey missions to Japan to assess the industrial capacity of the country and agreed with Kennan's suggestion. The United States ended the Advance Reparations Transfer Program, to which the Philippines, through Romulo and Foreign Affairs Undersecretary Felino Neri, objected. Countries involved also started working towards a peace treaty. Romulo and Neri put forth the Philippine position that they recognize the threat of Communism, as the country itself faces an insurgency of their own, and that they also welcome the Peace Treaty to ensure Japan can actively participate in negotiations. However, they reiterated their concern for reparations. When the 1951 San Francisco Peace Treaty was signed, Romulo lamented that it "fails to provide for reparations in the form and manner [they] desire." However, he conceded that it was still a step in the right direction as it would be even more detrimental for the Philippines not to sign it. Furthermore, he expressed optimism as Japanese Premier Shigeru Yoshida "solemnly pledged to [them] that Japan will do all that is humanly possible to repair the damage it has done to the Philippines."

In 1954, the Japanese government started to beguile or invite Filipinos to take-up their studies in their country, through the formation of scholarships that was managed by the Ministry of Education of Japan. Theoretically speaking, the students who would be availing of this invitation should be amongst the ones who would help the Philippines to recover or another angle, contribute to the economic development of the country. Only later in 1985 did the Japanese Ministry gave scholarships for those who wanted to pursue a course in a technical college, then three years later, for those who intend to pursue a vocational course.

Diplomatic relations were normalized and re-established in 1956, when the war reparations agreement was finally concluded. Over 198 Billion Japanese Yen or 550 Million U.S. Dollars, in 1956 prices, or an equivalent of $6.220 Billion U.S. Dollars in year 2025 prices, were given by Japan, in totality, as war reparations to the Philippines, before the reparations agreement was terminated. By the end of the 1950s, Japanese companies and individual investors had begun to return to the Philippines. Japan and the Philippines signed a Treaty of Amity, Commerce and Navigation in 1960, but the treaty did not go into effect until 1973.

=== Relations during the first Marcos Administration ===
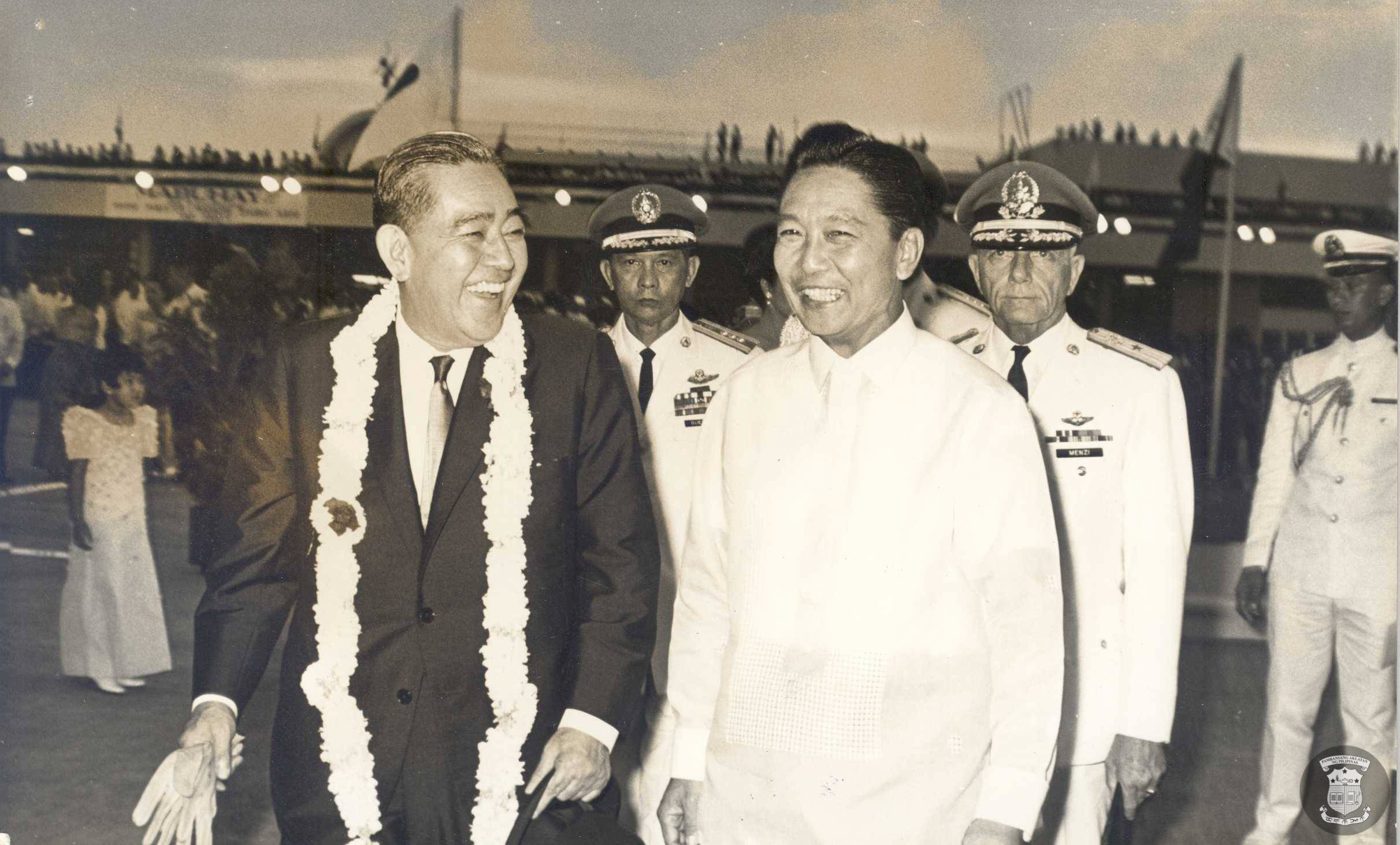
Japanese Prime Minister Eisaku Satō with Philippine President Ferdinand Marcos, 18 October 1967

Emperor Hirohito met with President Ferdinand Marcos in a state visit by the latter to Japan in September 1966 — a year after Marcos' election and about six years before Marcos declared martial law. In December 1966, Japanese Ambassador Harumi Takeuchi and President Marcos went to the barrio of Parang in Marikina, Rizal to lay the cornerstone for the construction of the Cottage Industries Technology Center, considered to be the first joint project to successfully materialize between the two nations, with Marcos stating that the cornerstone-laying rite marks the "beginning of a new epoch of cooperation." In October 1967, Prime Minister Eisaku Satō visited the Philippines as part of his goodwill tour through Southeast Asia, Australia and New Zealand.

In 1972, Marcos abolished the Philippine legislature under martial law, and took on its legislative powers as part of his authoritarian rule. He ratified the Treaty of Amity, Commerce and Navigation ten days prior to a visit of Japanese Prime Minister Kakuei Tanaka.

By 1975, Japan had displaced the United States as the main source of investment in the country. Marcos administration projects put up during this time include the Philippines-Japan Friendship Highway which included the construction of the San Juanico Bridge, and the Research Institute for Tropical Medicine. However, many of these projects were later criticized for helping prop up the corrupt practices of the Marcos administration, resulting in what became called the Marukosu giwaku (マルコス疑惑), or "Marcos scandal", of 1986.

Under Marcos, logging took on an increasingly central role in the Philippine economy. The government encouraged log exportation to Japan resulting from soaring wood demand during Japan's period of rapid economic growth, and pressure to pay foreign debt. Forests resources were exploited by set-up companies and reforestation was rarely undertaken. Japanese log traders purchased massive quantities of cheap logs from unsustainable sources, accelerating deforestation. Log production increased from 6.3 million cubic metres (220×10^{6} cu ft) in 1960 to an average of 10.5 million cubic metres (370×10^{6} cu ft) between 1968 and 1975, peaking at over 15 million cubic metres (530×10^{6} cu ft) in 1975, before declining to about 4 million cubic metres (140×10^{6} cu ft) in 1987. The 1970s and 1980s saw an average of 2.5% of Philippine forests disappearing every year, which was thrice the worldwide deforestation rate.

==== Japan ODA scandal ====
When the Marcoses were exiled to Hawaii in the United States in February 1986 after the People Power Revolution, the American authorities confiscated papers that they brought with them. The confiscated documents revealed that since the 1970s, Marcos and his associates received commissions of 10 to 15 percent of Overseas Economic Cooperation Fund loans from about fifty Japanese contractors.

This revelation became known as the Marukosu giwaku (マルコス疑惑), or "Marcos scandals", and had to be addressed by the administrations of succeeding presidents Corazon Aquino and Fidel V. Ramos. The Japanese government discreetly requested the Philippine government to downplay the issue as it would affect the business sector and bilateral relations.

The lessons from the Marcos scandals were among the reasons why Japan created its 1992 ODA Charter.

=== After 1986 ===
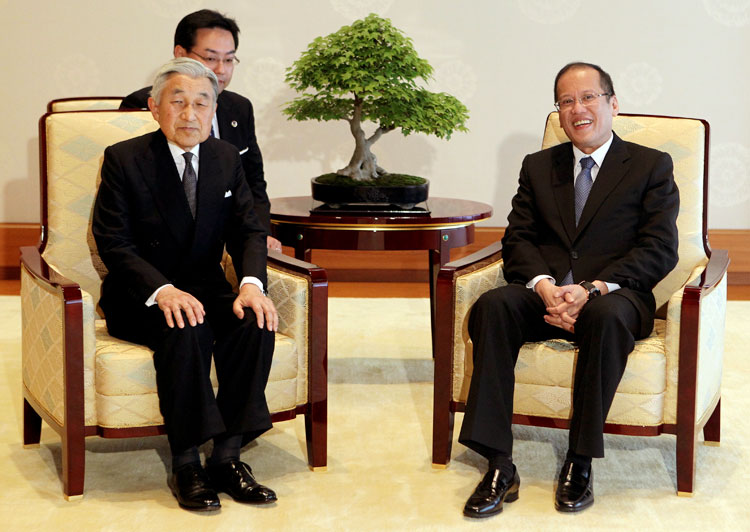
President Benigno Aquino III with Emperor Akihito in Tokyo (2011)

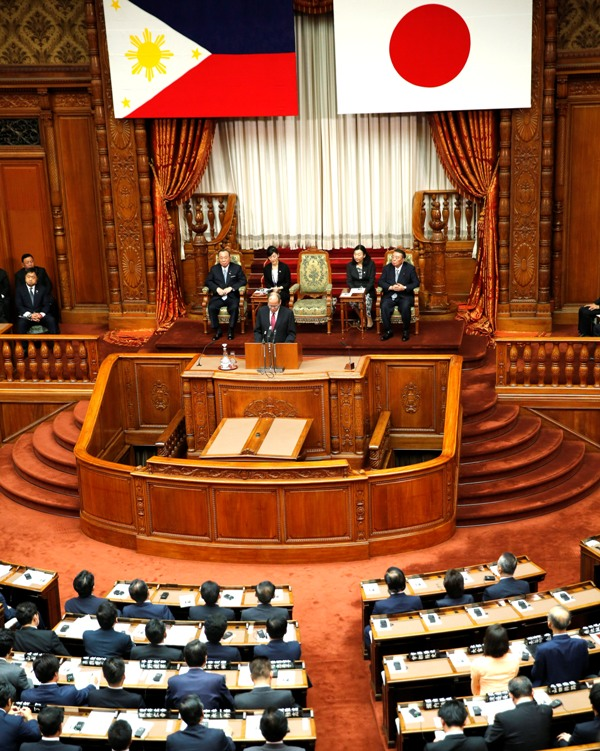
Philippine President Benigno Aquino III addresses a joint session of the National Diet in Tokyo, 3 June 2015

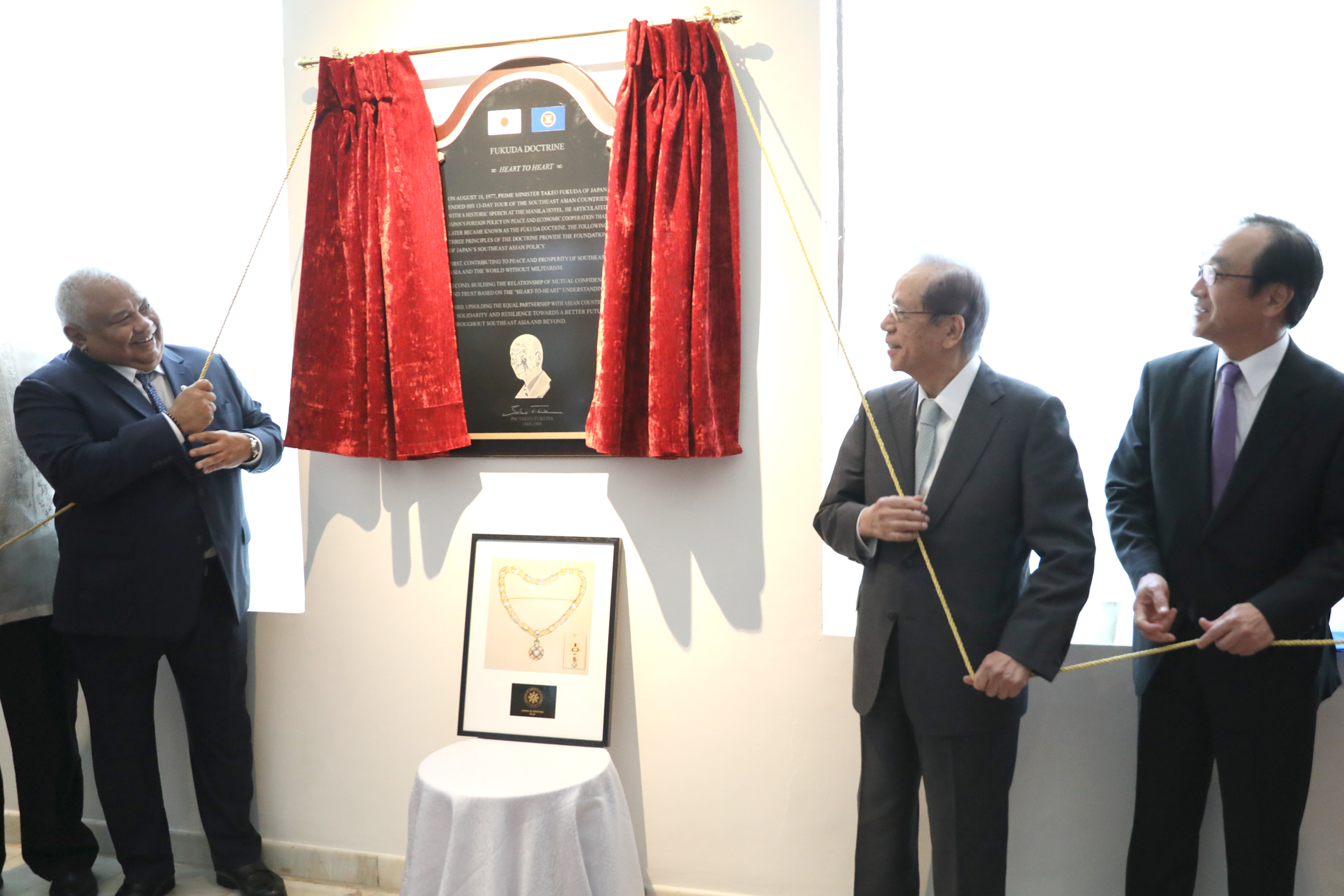
The unveiling of a marker commemorating the conception of the Fukuda Doctrine, a Japanese policy dedicated to non-militarization and pursuing of greater ties to Southeast Asian nations, at the Manila Hotel in the Philippines on 1 October 2018.

Japan remained a major source of development funds, trade, investment, and tourism in the 1980s, and there have been few foreign policy disputes between the two nations.

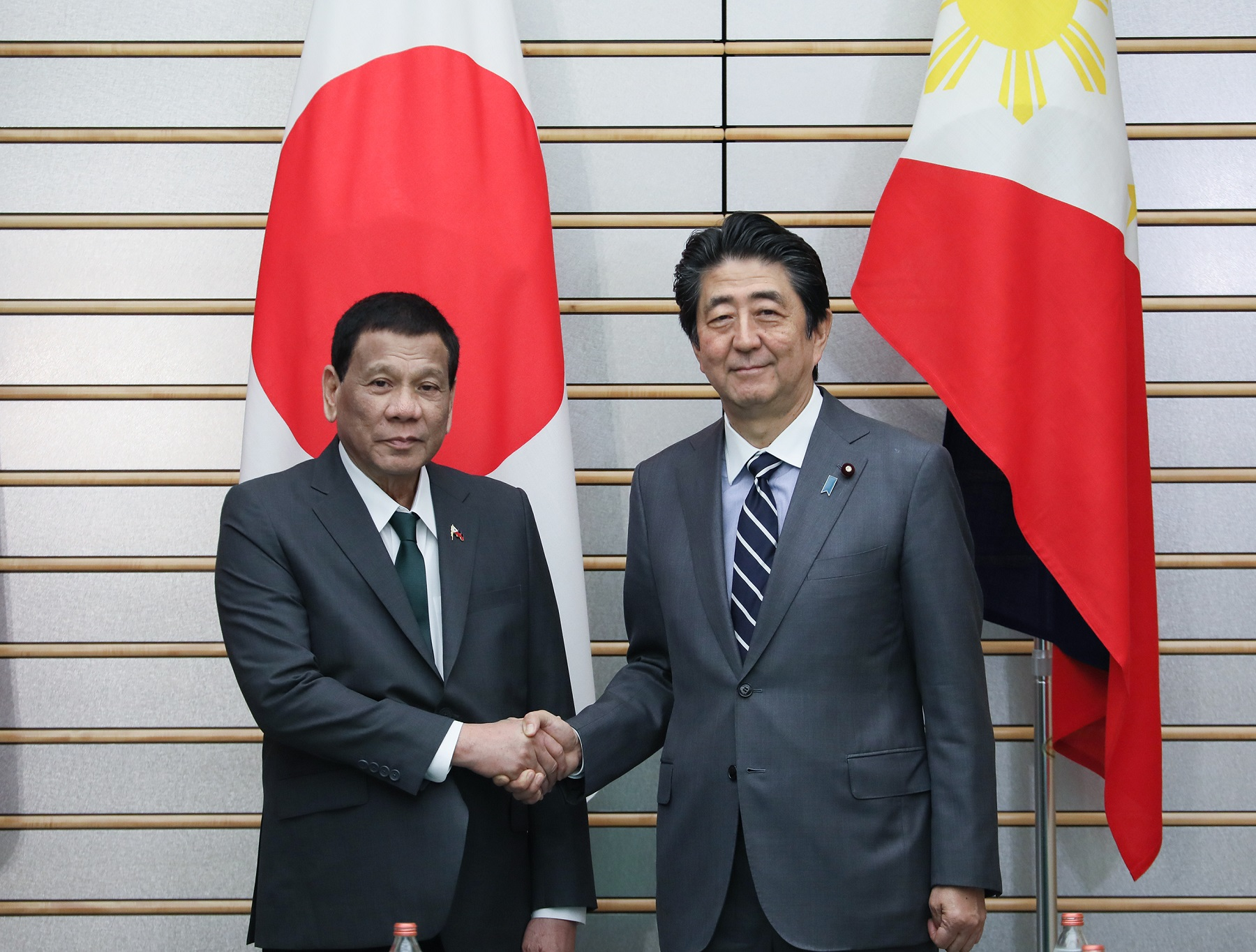
Philippine President Rodrigo Duterte with Japanese Prime Minister Shinzo Abe, 31 May 2019

When Philippine President Corazon Aquino's administration was installed as a result of the People Power Revolution, Japan was one of the first countries to express support for the new Philippine government.

Philippine President Corazon Aquino visited Japan in November 1986 and met with Emperor Hirohito, who offered his apologies for the wrongs committed by Japan during World War II. New foreign aid agreements also were concluded during this visit. Aquino returned to Japan in 1989 for Hirohito's funeral and in 1990 for the enthronement of Emperor Akihito.

Regarding the vote by the Philippine Senate to extend a treaty allowing the stay of U.S. bases in the Philippines, Japan was in favor for the extension of the defense treaty. In fact, some of its officials including Ambassador Toshio Goto, Foreign Minister Taro Nakayama and Prime Minister Toshiki Kaifu expressed public disagreement on a negative vote on the extension. However the Philippine Senate rejected the extension of the defense treaty despite extensive lobbying for its extension by the first Aquino administration, even calling for a referendum regarding the matter. In 1998, 246,000 Filipinos lived in Japan.

Upon the withdrawal of most American troops in the Philippines, relations between the United States and the Philippines remained strong as assured by US President Bill Clinton to Philippine President Fidel V. Ramos during the latter's visit to Washington on 21 November 1993. Likewise Philippines-Japan relations were strengthened, with Japan filling the gap the United States left. Even before Ramos became president he held talks with the Japan Ministry of Defense to improve defense relations as Defense Secretary under Corazon Aquino's administration.

During a meeting with President Ramos in 1993, Japanese Prime Minister Kiichi Miyazawa reiterated his apology for his country's war crimes committed against the Philippines and its people during World War II and would consider the best way to address the issue. The Ramos administration also supported Japan's bid to become a permanent member of the United Nations Security Council, together with Germany.

Japan also became the top donor of aid to the Philippines, followed by the United States and Germany. Japan also contributed the largest amount of international aid to the Philippines after the latter suffered from the 1990 Luzon earthquake and 1991 Mount Pinatubo eruption.

=== 21st century ===
In 2009, Japan supported an NGO which repatriated the skeletons of Japanese soldiers from World War II. The NGO repatriated numerous skeletons of indigenous Filipino ancestors, along with few Japanese skeletons, sparking protests in the Philippines. Japan ended its support for the skeleton repatriation program afterwards; however, the remains of the indigenous Filipinos were never sent back to the ancestral communities they were stolen from.

Strategic relations between the two countries have been strong recently. Japan supports the resolution of the Islamic insurgency in the Philippines. In 2013, Japan announced it would donate ten ships valued at US$11 million to the Philippine Coast Guard. Japan and the Philippines share a "mutual concern" on China's increasing assertiveness in its territorial claims.

In November 2015, the Philippine government under President Noynoy Aquino and the Japan International Cooperation Agency (JICA) signed a $2-billion loan agreement for the JICA to fund part of the construction of a railway system between the Tutuban railway station in Manila to Malolos, Bulacan in the Philippines, which is targeted to become the country's largest railway system. According to the Philippine Department of Finance, the agreement was the JICA's "largest assistance ever extended to any country for a single project."

On 29 February 2016, Japan signed a pact to supply defense equipment to Philippines. The agreement provides a framework for the supply of defense equipment and technology and will allow the two countries to carry out joint research and development projects. On 3 April 2016, the Japanese training submarine JS Oyashio, along with two destroyers JS Ariake and JS Setogiri docked at the Alava Pier on Subic Bay for a three-day goodwill visit. In early May 2016, plans to spearhead a Japan-Philippine Mutual Defense Treaty were announced as the top foreign policy priority of Mar Roxas if he were to win the presidency. However, the 10 May presidential election resulted in the victory of Rodrigo Duterte. In October 2016, expectations of talks for the defense treaty were revived when the government stated that the possible treaty 'may' be discussed by Duterte and Abe during Duterte's first official visit to Japan. The visit, however, resulted in no talks, after Duterte decided to ally himself with China.

In 2017, civilian groups in the Philippines and other countries joined forces to push for the inscription of Voices of the ”Comfort Women” in the UNESCO Memory of the World Programme. The inscription, however, was blocked by Japan. On the same year, a blindfolded Filipina comfort women statue was erected in Manila, the capital of the Philippines, by surviving Filipino comfort women and their supporters. By April 2018, Duterte said the statue was part of free expression; however, the comfort woman statue was removed from the capital after Japan complained about it. The statue was scheduled to be reinstalled at front of Baclaran Church, but was allegedly stolen.

On 10 February 2023, new Prime Minister Fumio Kishida oversaw the signing of several defense pacts and investment deals between the two countries with new President Bongbong Marcos; Marcos also announced he was considering opening tripartite defense talks with the United States and Japan. The Philippines and Japan achieved an unprecedented high in defense ties in July 2024, by signing a landmark military pact, the Reciprocal Access Agreement (RAA), allowing mutual deployment of military troops in their countries amid rising tensions with China. Enrique Manalo highlighted the enhanced partnership, while both nations expressed concern over China's actions in the South China Sea. The agreement, pending parliamentary ratification, aimed to ease military cooperation and disaster response.

On 16 December 2024, the RAA was signed officially and unanimously ratified by the Philippine Senate (Resolution No. 1248). The pact will officially take effect on 11 September 2025, exactly 30 days after Foreign Affairs Secretary Theresa Lazaro and the Japanese Ambassador to The Philippines Endo Kazuya exchanged diplomatic notes at the Department of Foreign Affairs in Manila. On 6 July 2025, The Yomiuri Shimbun reported that the Japanese Navy will export six used Abukuma-class destroyer escorts to the Armed Forces of the Philippines to strengthen the Philippine Navy due to territorial disputes in the South China Sea. In January 2026, the two countries signed a defense pact for tax-free provision of ammunition, fuel, and other items. In May 2026, Japan and the Philippines upgraded their ties during President Bongbong Marcos's state visit to Japan, with the two countries agreed to strengthen defense cooperation through planned Japanese arms sales, intelligence sharing, and joint military exercises amid rising tensions over China's growing military presence in the South China Sea and near Taiwan. The same month, the two countries also agreed to start talks on demarcating their maritime boundaries. In August 2026, Philippine President Bongbong Marcos conferred the Order of Sikatuna, Grand Cross with Distinction, on Japanese Ambassador Endo Kazuya for his contributions to Philippine-Japanese relations. Endo was recognized for advancing bilateral cooperation in areas including defense, security, development, infrastructure, education, transportation, and maritime affairs.

== Japanese Official Development Assistance (ODA) to the Philippines ==
Japan has been the Philippines' biggest source of bilateral Official Development Assistance since 2001, with its ODA loans to the Philippines accounting for 72 percent of the Philippines’ total bilateral loan portfolio as of 2021.

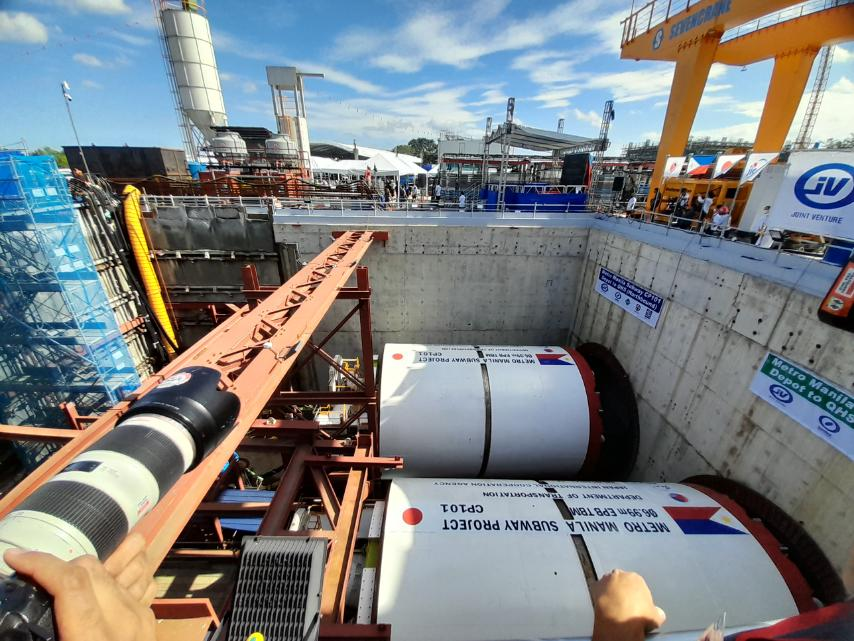
Tunnel Boring Machines utilized in the construction of the Metro Manila Subway, a project primarily funded by the Japan International Cooperation Agency (JICA).

Japan disburses Official Development Assistance to the Philippines through the Japan International Cooperation Agency (JICA) when the ODA is in the form of projects, and directly through the Embassy of Japan to the Philippines in the case of non-project grant aid.

Japan decided in early June 2025—during a high-level meeting in Singapore between Defence Minister Gen Nakatani and Philippine counterpart Gilberto Teodoro—that it would transfer six decommissioned Abukuma-class destroyer escorts to the Philippine Navy.

On 15 May 2026, Japan said it might send Type 88 anti-ship missiles to the Philippines to strengthen its coastal defenses. The move comes amid rising tensions in the South China Sea, where China's growing control and assertiveness threaten regional security.

== See also ==
- Japanese in the Philippines
- Japanese occupation of the Philippines
- Filipinos in Japan
- Dom Justo Takayama (Takayama Ukon)
- Domingo Siazon
- Marcos scandals
- Taft–Katsura Agreement
- Diwata (satellite)
