= Embassy of the Philippines, Tokyo =

Diplomatic mission of the Philippines in Japan

Embassy of the Philippines, Tokyo Pasuguan ng Pilipinas sa Tokyo 駐日フィリピン大使館

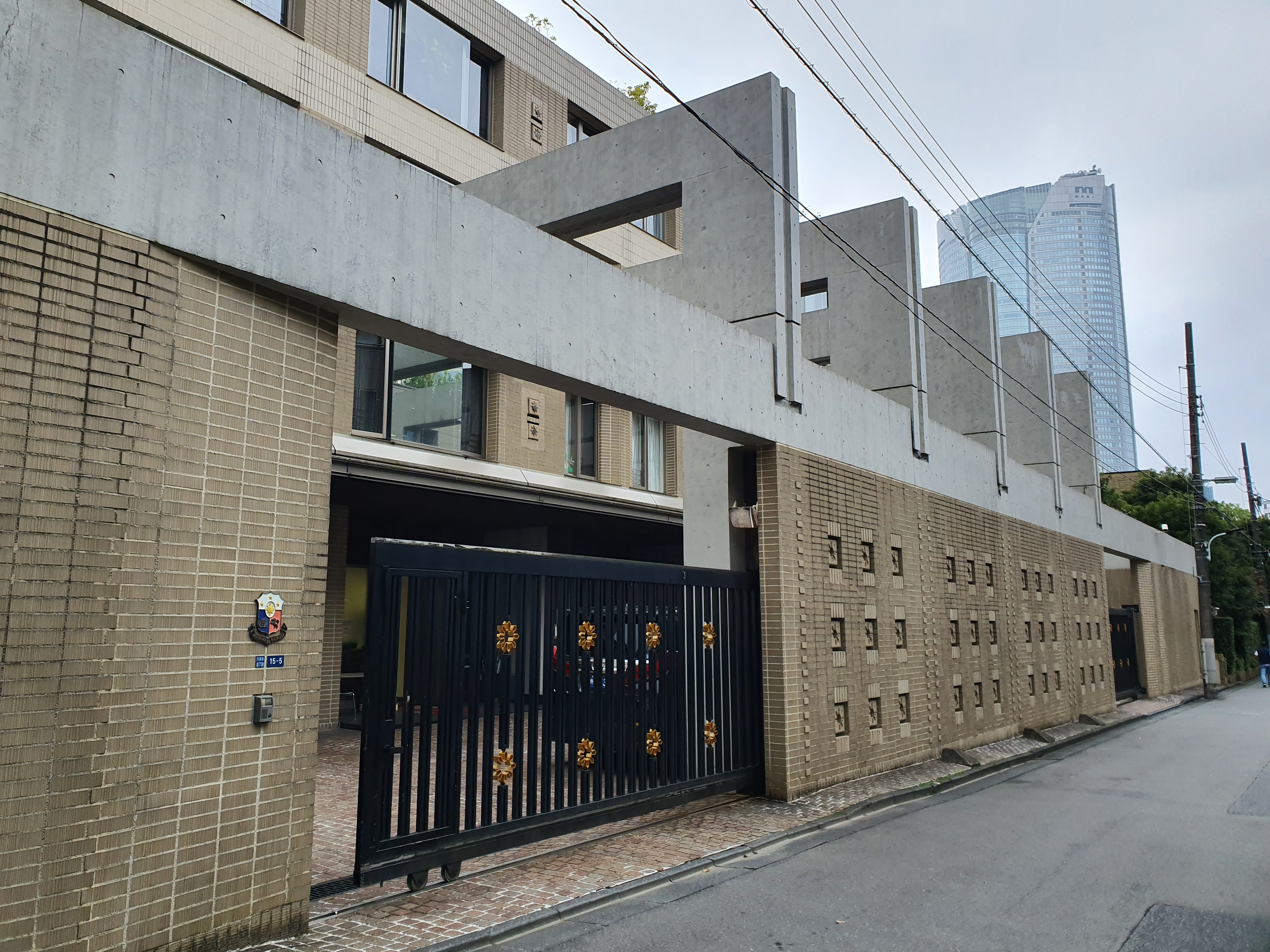
- Location: Tokyo
- Address: 15-5, Roppongi 5-chōme, Minato-ku
- Coordinates: 35°39′36″N 139°44′08″E
- Ambassador: Mylene J. Garcia-Albano
- Website: Official website

The Embassy of the Philippines in Tokyo (駐日フィリピン大使館, Chūnichi Firipin Taishikan) is the diplomatic mission of the Republic of the Philippines to Japan. Opened in 1944 as the first embassy established by a Philippine government, it is currently located in the Roppongi district of Tokyo's Minato ward, near the Roppongi Hills development.

== History ==
The Philippine Embassy in Tokyo was first established shortly after the inauguration of the Japanese puppet Second Philippine Republic, the first time the Philippines had established an embassy in a foreign country.

A week after the Second Republic's inauguration, and shortly after it established a Ministry of Foreign Affairs on October 21, 1943, President Jose P. Laurel named Jorge B. Vargas, who had previously served as Mayor of Manila and chair of the Philippine Executive Commission which directly preceded the Second Republic, as ambassador to Japan on October 25, 1943. Vargas arrived in Tokyo on February 10, 1944 to assume his post, and the embassy formally opened on March 24, 1944. At the time, the embassy's six staff members, including both Vargas and León María Guerrero III, who served as its second secretary, made up the Second Republic's entire foreign service.

Although the embassy had been in operation for two years, the pre-war Commonwealth of the Philippines never recognized its establishment, and it was summarily closed with Japan's defeat in World War II. After the Philippines achieved independence from the United States on July 4, 1946, President Manuel Roxas wrote letters to General Douglas MacArthur, in his capacity as Supreme Commander for the Allied Powers, asking that embassy staff be turned over to Philippine authorities and that it be converted into quarters for a Commission on Reparations that would press Japan for reparations for damages caused during the war. The SCAP subsequently confiscated jewelry belonging to the families of both Laurel and Camilo Osías, who served as Minister of Education in the Second Republic, from the Embassy building, which were later turned over to the Philippine government and returned to both families on March 10, 1949.

Replacing the Second Republic-era embassy was a special mission, which was established in 1948 during the presidency of Elpidio Quirino. In 1956, after Japan and the Philippines signed agreements addressing wartime reparations, thereby normalizing relations between the two countries, Congress would pass Republic Act No. 1611 at the urging of Quirino's successor, Ramon Magsaysay, converting the mission into an embassy with an initial budget of ₱100,000. Felino Neri, who led the negotiations between Japan and the Philippines, would become the Philippines' new ambassador to Japan.

The embassy was initially run out of the Yasuda Mansion, better known today as the Kudan, until it first moved to Roppongi in 1958. In 1976, it relocated to Nanpeidaichō in Shibuya, subsequently returning to Roppongi in 2003.

In 2023, the embassy's jurisdiction was widened to include the Marshall Islands, the Federated States of Micronesia and Palau, taking over from the Philippine Embassy in Washington, D.C.

== Chancery ==
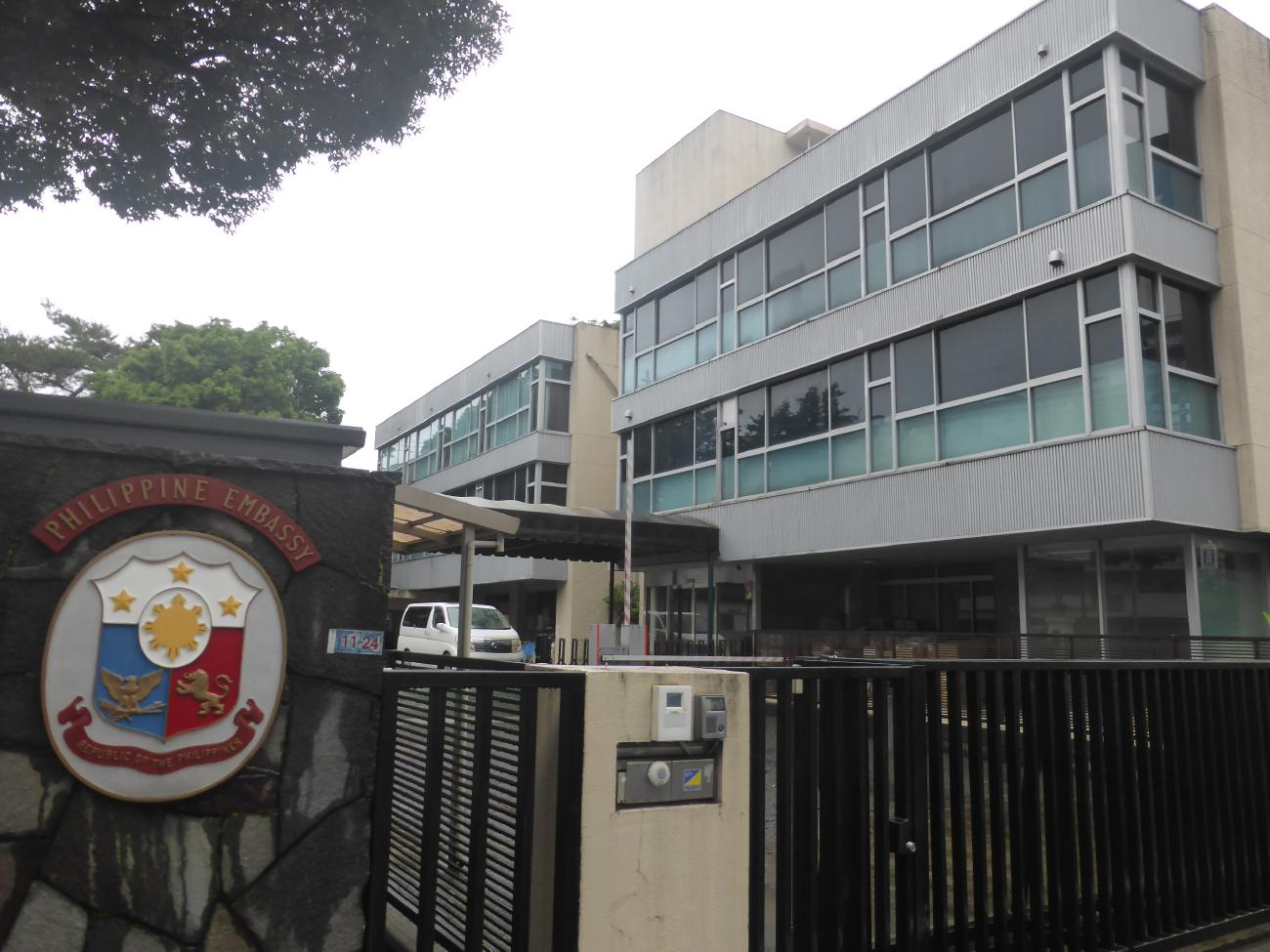
The Embassy's former chancery at 11-24 Nanpeidaichō in Shibuya, which is now an annex and community space.

The chancery of the Philippine Embassy in Tokyo is currently located on a 3,179-square-meter (34,220 sq ft) site in Roppongi which was acquired by the Philippine government as part of a negotiated settlement with Japan on war reparations. As part of that agreement, the Roppongi property was specifically acquired for the purpose of hosting the embassy's chancery.

Before the current chancery was built, the site originally hosted a three-story villa built in 1923 in the Renaissance style. The villa — highly acclaimed at the time — featured an observatory tower and was surrounded by Japanese gardens with tall trees and laced with imported stones. Originally owned by Ryoji Oda and his wife, Ineko, for 33 years, the property was seized by the Japanese government due to non-payment of tax arrears, and was subsequently transferred by Japan to the Philippine government on June 27, 1958, in fulfillment of its reparations obligations.

In 1976, the embassy relocated to a three-story building on a 2,490-square-meter (26,800 sq ft) site in Nanpeidaichō, which was also turned over to the Philippine government as part of Japan's war reparations. Previously known as the Philippine Reparations building, the embassy relocated to Shibuya owing to difficulties in maintaining the Roppongi property, and by 1997 it was virtually left abandoned owing to those difficulties. Today, the Nanpeidaichō property serves as an annex of the chancery, as well as a venue for community events organized by the Filipino community in Japan.

On April 18, 1997, the Philippine government entered into an agreement with a consortium between Mitsui Fudosan, the Itochu Corporation and the Shimizu Corporation to redevelop the Roppongi property at no cost to the government, which was approved two months later by President Fidel V. Ramos. Ramos led a groundbreaking of the project on November 19, 1997 while transiting through Tokyo on his way to APEC Canada 1997 in Vancouver, and construction of the 2,413-square-meter (25,970 sq ft) building was completed in February 2003.

Although the embassy owns the underlying land on which the chancery is built, it doesn't own the entire building; instead, it only owns outright the portions that it occupies, which include part of the basement and the entire first floor. Full ownership of the building is scheduled to revert to the Philippine government in 2047.

=== Disposal and redevelopment of assets ===
The Philippine government has, on a number of occasions, contemplated either disposing of or redeveloping the properties in its Japanese portfolio, generating significant controversy in the process.

In 1989, at the height of the Japanese asset price bubble, the government of President Corazon Aquino attempted to sell the Roppongi property for $225 million (₱6 billion), with much of the proceeds from the sale reportedly reverting to the Japanese government in the form of taxes. The move was strongly opposed by Salvador Laurel, her Vice President and President Laurel's son, who contended that because the property was obtained as war reparations, it serves as a priceless reminder of Filipinos' sacrifice and bravery during World War II. Laurel petitioned the Supreme Court to intervene, subsequently issuing a temporary restraining order. On February 20, 1990, the Supreme Court ruled in Laurel v. Garcia that the property may not be disposed of without the approval of Congress, agreeing with Laurel on the matter of the symbolic nature of the property, and also ruling that the property was "of public dominion". This subsequently led to the development of the property and the construction of the current chancery.

Disposal of the Roppongi, Nanpeidaichō and other Japanese properties, including that of the Kudan, have also been contemplated during the presidencies of Gloria Macapagal Arroyo, which opted instead to redevelop them, and Rodrigo Duterte. In 2019, Jose Antonio Sy-Alvarado, who represents the first district of Bulacan in the House of Representatives, filed a bill which would have authorized the sale of the properties to fund the pensions of Filipino war veterans; this elicited strong opposition from Foreign Affairs Secretary Teodoro Locsin Jr., who also criticized attempts to sell the properties to fund the Philippine government's response to the COVID-19 pandemic, and was joined in this regard by Senators Franklin Drilon and Leila de Lima. The Duterte administration has also looked at redevelopment opportunities, particularly for the Nanpeidaichō property, and Presidential Spokesperson Harry Roque has stated that the Philippine government will only dispense of the properties if it's necessary for it to do so.

In 2006, the Arroyo administration entered into a controversial deal to redevelop the Nanpeidaichō property; after years of litigation, the property was recovered by the government in 2013, and the deal was nullified by the Court of Appeals the following year, with the Philippine government ordered to pay restitution to the developer that won the deal eight years earlier. The case is still pending before the Supreme Court, and the property was also the subject of several cases heard in Japanese courts between 2007 and 2018.

== Staff and activities ==
The Philippine Embassy in Tokyo is headed by the Philippine ambassador to Japan, Mylene J. Garcia-Albano.

Prior to her appointment as ambassador, Garcia-Albano served as the representative for Davao City's 2nd congressional district from 2010 to 2019, and later became Deputy Speaker of the House of Representatives. Her husband, Rodolfo Albano III, is the incumbent governor of Isabela. After serving in Congress she was appointed to the position by President Bongbong Marcos on August 11, 2022. Her appointment was subsequently confirmed by the Commission on Appointments on September 21, 2022, and she presented her credentials to Emperor Naruhito on April 19, 2023, becoming the Philippines' first female ambassador to Japan.

A number of prominent Filipinos have also served as ambassadors to Japan, including Jose S. Laurel III, son of former President José P. Laurel, former Foreign Affairs Secretary Domingo Siazon (who notably served as Ambassador twice), businessman Alfonso Yuchengco, and Roberto Benedicto, a crony of former President Ferdinand Marcos, father of Bongbong Marcos.

The embassy is one of the Philippines' largest foreign posts, with seven Philippine government agencies being represented across eight different offices. Many of its activities center around ensuring the welfare of the large community of Filipinos in Japan, especially during natural disasters. These include monitoring Filipinos who may have been impacted by the 2019 Yamagata earthquake, and repatriating the more than 500 Filipinos on board the Diamond Princess as it was beset by an outbreak of COVID-19 in the early stages of the pandemic. The embassy also organizes social events for the Filipino community, such as organizing a series of Simbang Gabi Masses, and is active both in economic endeavors, where it regularly encourages Japanese investment in the Philippines, and in cultural promotion activities, such as hosting the first fashion show by a Filipino designer in Japan to be held in over 50 years.

On occasion, the embassy has been criticized for how it conducts its operations. In 2013, it was accused of neglecting Overseas Filipino Workers who were deported from Japan, while in 2016, it was accused of mishandling its vote count for the 2016 Philippine general election by supporters of Bongbong Marcos, who at the time was running for vice president.

== See also ==
- Japan–Philippines relations
- List of diplomatic missions of the Philippines
