= Embassy of the Philippines, Washington, D.C. =

Diplomatic mission of the Philippines in Washington, D.C., United States

Embassy of the Philippines, Washington, D.C. Pasuguan ng Pilipinas sa Washington, D.C.

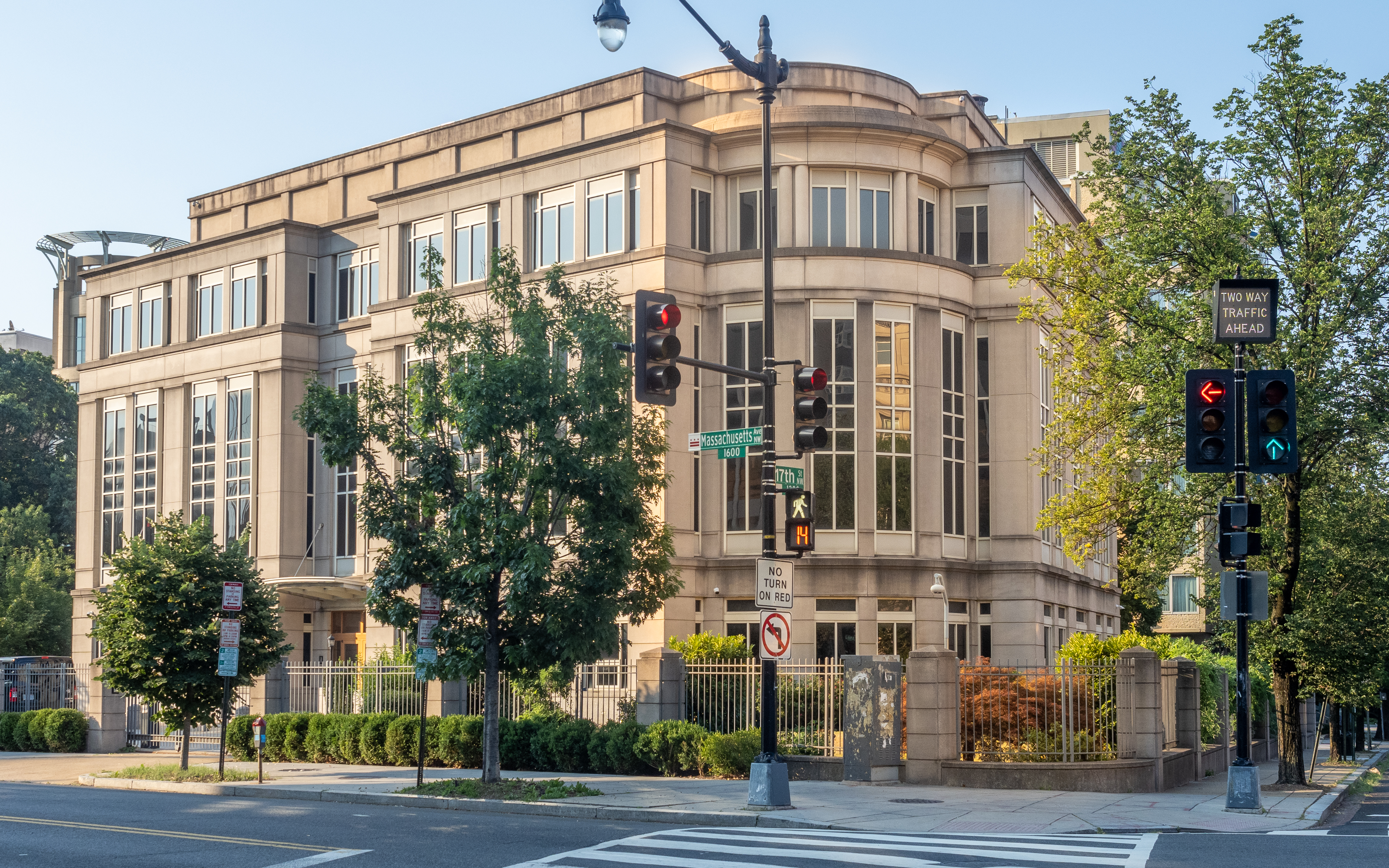
- Location: Washington, D.C., United States
- Address: 1600 Massachusetts Avenue, N.W.
- Coordinates: 38°54′26″N 77°2′17″W
- Ambassador: Jose Manuel Romualdez
- Website: philippineembassy-dc.org

The Embassy of the Philippines in Washington, D.C. (Filipino: Pasuguan ng Pilipinas sa Washington D.C. also Filipino: Embahada ng Pilipinas sa Washington D.C.) is the diplomatic mission of the Republic of the Philippines to the United States. It is located at 1600 Massachusetts Avenue, Northwest, Washington, D.C. It predates the independence of the Philippines, and is the oldest Philippine legation overseas, though the distinction of the first Philippine embassy proper overseas, belongs to the Philippine Embassy in Tokyo.

== Buildings ==
=== Main chancery ===
The Philippine embassy's main chancery comprises five floors, including a basement level. The ground floor contains the Carlos P. Romulo Hall, utilized as the embassy's event space. The second floor accommodates the offices of the Ambassador and the Deputy Chief of Mission, in addition to the embassy's administrative section. Located on the third floor are the Political and Legislative, Economic, and Public and Cultural Diplomacy sections, as well as the embassy library. The fourth floor houses offices for Partner Agency Representatives, conference rooms, and a records room.

Construction began in 1991, and the building was inaugurated in 1993 by President Fidel V. Ramos during his first official visit to Washington, D.C. The main chancery's Beaux-Arts design was chosen to match the architectural style of Massachusetts Avenue. In 2019, the building underwent renovations, including an upgrade of the CCTV surveillance system to high-definition.

=== Chancery annex ===
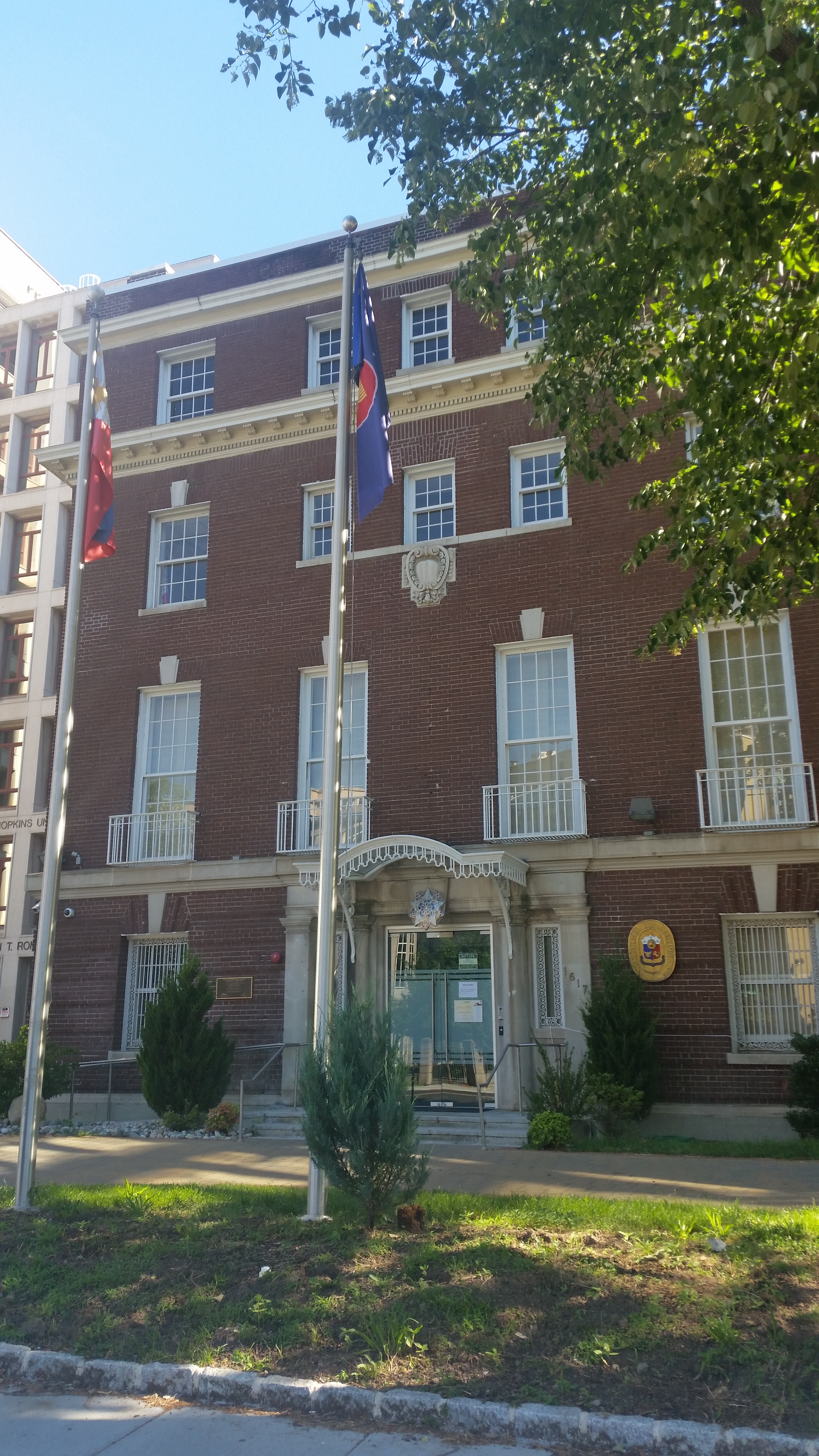
The former chancery (and now consular section) located at 1617 Massachusetts Avenue

The Philippine embassy's chancery annex, originally constructed in 1917 as a private residence for platinum mine owner Daniel C. Stapleton and his wife, Stella Stapleton, functioned as the embassy's primary chancery from 1946 (the year of Philippine independence) to 1995. This four-story building has a floor area of approximately 370 square meters (4,000 sq ft) per floor. Consular services are located on the first and third floors. The first-floor lobby features "Fandango" hanging lamps by Filipino designer Kenneth Cobonpue and a mural, The Great Promenade of Philippine-American Friendship, by Filipino artist Dominic Rubio. The second floor, formerly the ambassador's office, has been repurposed into an event space named Quezon Hall, and features portraits of Manuel L. Quezon by Fernando Amorsolo and Andrés Bonifacio by Diosdado M. Lorenzo; the latter portrait sustained bullet damage during a hostage incident in 1974. The fourth floor houses a branch of the Sentro Rizal cultural center, featuring the "Cocoon" metal furniture collection by Filipino designer Ann Pamintuan, a native of Davao City.

The chancery annex was purchased by the Philippine government from the Stapleton family in 1941. From 1943 and during World War II, the building housed the Office of the Resident Commissioner and served as headquarters for the Philippine Commonwealth government-in-exile. In 1998, a memorandum of understanding was signed between the Philippine government and the National Federation of Filipino American Associations (NaFFAA) to lease the building as a community center; this agreement was not implemented due to funding constraints. Elmer G. Cato, a Filipino journalist and diplomat who later served as Consul General of the Philippines in Milan, has documented the embassy's practice of inspecting and sealing the coffins of deceased Filipinos before repatriation. Embassy staff have reported alleged sightings of “TNT ghosts,” (Note: The abbreviation "TNT" stands for "tago nang tago", meaning “always hiding” or “to keep on hiding” in English.) referring to purported spirits of undocumented Filipino immigrants who sought refuge at the embassy.

During Albert del Rosario's tenure as ambassador of the Philippines to the United States, he advocated for the building's renovation. After renovations lasting approximately 18 months (from 2015) and costing at least $3 million, the chancery annex assumed its current function in 2018; the renovations were overseen by Leuterio Thomas, a Filipino-American architectural firm. Also in 2018, the building became the second structure outside the Philippines to be designated a National Historical Landmark by the National Historical Commission of the Philippines, following the Residence of the Philippine Ambassador to Japan.

== Incidents ==
On November 18, 1974, Napoleon Lechoco Sr., an attorney residing in Oxon Hill, Maryland, took Philippine Ambassador to the United States Eduardo Romualdez and economic attaché Mario S. Lagdameo hostage at the main chancery building. Lechoco Sr. held the two men for 11 hours, demanding that the Philippine government issue an exit permit for his son, whom he claimed was being held as a political prisoner. The following morning, after the Philippine government under President Ferdinand Marcos Sr. acceded to his demands, Lechoco Sr. surrendered to police and was taken to St. Elizabeths Hospital for psychiatric evaluation. In 1976, Lechoco Sr. was convicted of kidnapping and sentenced to ten years in prison; however, the conviction was overturned in 1977 after a finding of not guilty by reason of insanity. This incident is reported to be the first instance of a foreign ambassador being taken hostage in the United States.

In 1983, one week following the assassination of Ninoy Aquino, three individuals approached the entrance of the main chancery building and threw two incendiary devices into the lobby. The resulting fire shattered the glass panels of the front door and ignited the lobby. The embassy had received two prior bomb threats.
