= Domingo Siazon Jr. =

Filipino diplomat (1939–2016)

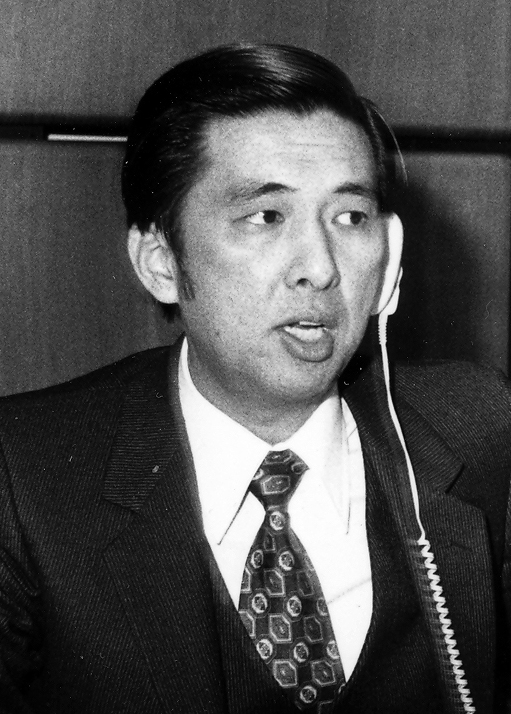
- Siazon in 1979

20th Secretary of Foreign Affairs
- In office May 1, 1995 – January 20, 2001
- President: Fidel Ramos; Joseph Estrada
- Preceded by: Roberto Romulo
- Succeeded by: Teofisto Guingona Jr.

Director-General of the United Nations Industrial Development Organization
- In office 1985–1992
- Preceded by: Abdel Rahman Khane
- Succeeded by: Mauricio de María y Campos

Personal details
- Born: Domingo Lim Siazon, Jr. July 9, 1939 Aparri, Cagayan, Commonwealth of the Philippines
- Died: May 3, 2016 (aged 76) Tokyo, Japan
- Spouse: Kazuko Siazon
- Children: 2
- Education: Ateneo de Manila University; University of Tsukuba; Harvard University
- Occupation: Diplomat

Domingo Lim Siazon, Jr. (July 9, 1939 – May 3, 2016) was a Filipino diplomat. He served as the Director-General of the United Nations Industrial Development Organization from 1985 to 1992, the 18th Philippine Secretary of Foreign Affairs from 1995 to 2001, and the Philippine Ambassador to Japan from 1993 to 1995 (1st term) and 2001 to 2010 (2nd term).

In 1976, Siazon was named Philippine ambassador to Austria, where he concurrently served as Philippine Permanent Representative to the United Nations in Vienna and to the International Atomic Energy Agency (IAEA). He was the former Secretary of Foreign Affairs of the Republic of the Philippines and Director-General of the United Nations Industrial Development Organization (UNIDO) from 1985 to 1992.

Siazon obtained his Bachelor of Arts degree in political science from the Ateneo de Manila University. He earned a second degree in Physics from the Tokyo University of Education, where he studied as a Japanese government scholar. He also has a Master of Public Administration from the John F. Kennedy School of Government, Harvard University in Massachusetts and an economics certificate from the Economic Institute of the University of Colorado. In 1997, he was conferred an award of Medal of Merit from the Philippines-Japan Society.

He was fluent in Ilocano, English, French, Spanish, Japanese, German, and Tagalog.

As Foreign Secretary, he oversaw the establishment of formal diplomatic ties between the Philippines and North Korea in July 2000.

Siazon was married to his wife, Kazuko, and had two children. He died on May 3, 2016, in Tokyo, Japan, of prostate cancer.

Government offices
Preceded by Roberto Romulo	Secretary of Foreign Affairs; 1995–2001	Succeeded by Teofisto Guingona Jr.
Diplomatic posts
Preceded by Position established	Ambassador of the Philippines to Austria; 1973–1979 (Chargé d'Affaires), 1980–1986 (Ambassador)	Succeeded by Nelson D. Lavinia
Preceded by Ramon V. Del Rosario	Ambassador of the Philippines to Japan; 1993–1995	Succeeded by Alfonso Yuchengco
Preceded by Romeo A. Arguelles	Ambassador of the Philippines to Japan; 2001–2010	Succeeded by Manuel M. Lopez
