= Charles Lane Fitzhugh =

United States Army general (1838–1923)

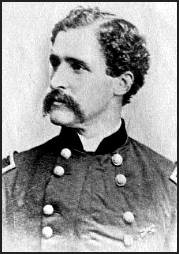
- General Charles Lane Fitzhugh
- Born: August 22, 1838; Oswego, New York, US
- Died: September 16, 1923 (aged 85); Cobourg, Ontario, Canada
- Burial place: Arlington National Cemetery
- Military career
- Allegiance: United States of America; Union
- Branch: United States Army; Union Army
- Service years: 1861 - 1868
- Rank: Colonel; Brevet Brigadier General
- Commands: 6th New York Cavalry Regiment; 2nd Brigade, 1st Cavalry Division
- Conflicts: American Civil War

Charles Lane Fitzhugh (August 22, 1838 – September 16, 1923) was a Union Army colonel during the American Civil War, who was later appointed a brevet brigadier general of volunteers for gallantry, energy and ability and a brevet brigadier general in the regular U.S. Army for gallant and meritorious services in the field during the war.

== Early life ==
Fitzhugh was born on August 22, 1838, in Oswego, New York. He attended Yale University before being appointed a cadet at the United States Military Academy.

== Military career ==
Fitzhugh was appointed to the United States Military Academy in 1859, but left in September 1861 before finishing to join the Union war effort. He was commissioned as a first lieutenant in the 4th United States Regular Artillery in October 1861, and served as an Aide-de-Camp to major general Don Carlos Buell between 1861 and 1863, including during the April 1862 Shiloh Campaign.

Fitzhugh then led the 4th Regular Artillery's Battery C, commanding it in all the Army of the Potomac's 1864 battles and campaigns in Virginia. On December 24, 1864, he was commissioned a Colonel of Volunteers, and was given command of the 6th New York Cavalry Regiment on February 18, 1865. His direct role with the unit, though, was nominal; he was promoted specifically to command the Second Brigade, First Cavalry Division of Major General Philip Sheridan's Army of the Shenandoah. He led the brigade from January 15, 1865, through to the end of the war on May 29, 1865, including during the Appomattox Campaign. From May 29, 1865, to June 17, 1865, he was given command of Second Brigade, First Cavalry Division, 22nd Corps, Department of Washington. On June 17, 1865, he was appointed in charge of the 2nd New York Provisional Cavalry (a "holding" unit for soldiers awaiting muster out) before being mustered out the volunteer service himself on August 6, 1865.

On January 13, 1866, President Andrew Johnson nominated Fitzhugh for appointment to the grade of brevet brigadier general of volunteers for "gallantry, energy and ability" to rank from March 13, 1865, and the United States Senate confirmed the appointment on March 12, 1866. On July 17, 1866, President Johnson nominated Fitzhugh for appointment to the grade of brevet brigadier general in the U.S. Regular Army for "gallant and meritorious services in the field during the war" to rank from March 13, 1866, and the U.S. Senate confirmed the appointment on July 23, 1866.

Reverting to Regular Army rank of lieutenant, he served in the postbellum forces until he resigned on May 21, 1868.

He then engaged in steel manufacturing until his retirement. He died at age at 85 in 1923 at Cobourg, Ontario, Canada. He is buried at Arlington National Cemetery.

== See also ==
- List of American Civil War brevet generals (Union)
