= The Kudan =

Official residence of the ambassador of the Philippines to Japan

Kudan
- 九段
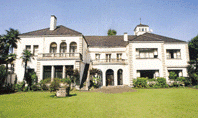
- Interactive map of the Kudan area

General information
- Status: Completed
- Location: Tokyo, Japan
- Coordinates: 35°41′49″N 139°44′57″E
- Current tenants: Philippine Ambassador to Tokyo
- Construction started: March 1933
- Completed: January 1935
- Owner: Government of the Philippines

Technical details
- Floor count: 2

Design and construction
- Architect: Tokisuke Yokogawa
- Architecture firm: Yokogawa Construction; Takenaka Corporation
- Designations: National Historical Landmark, 2013, by the National Historical Commission of the Philippines

National Historical Landmarks
- Official name: Embassy of the Philippines Tokyo
- Type: Building, Foreign Embassy
- Designated: March 9, 1962; 64 years ago
- Reference no.: 1962
- Region: Overseas
- Marker date: 1962; 64 years ago

The Residence of the Philippine Ambassador to Tokyo, informally known as the Kudan (九段), is the official residence of the Philippine ambassador to Japan. It is located in 1-1-1 Fujimi, Chiyoda-ku, Tokyo, Japan. It is called the "crown jewel of Philippine foreign service" and became the first officially designated National Historical Landmark outside Philippine soil.

== History ==
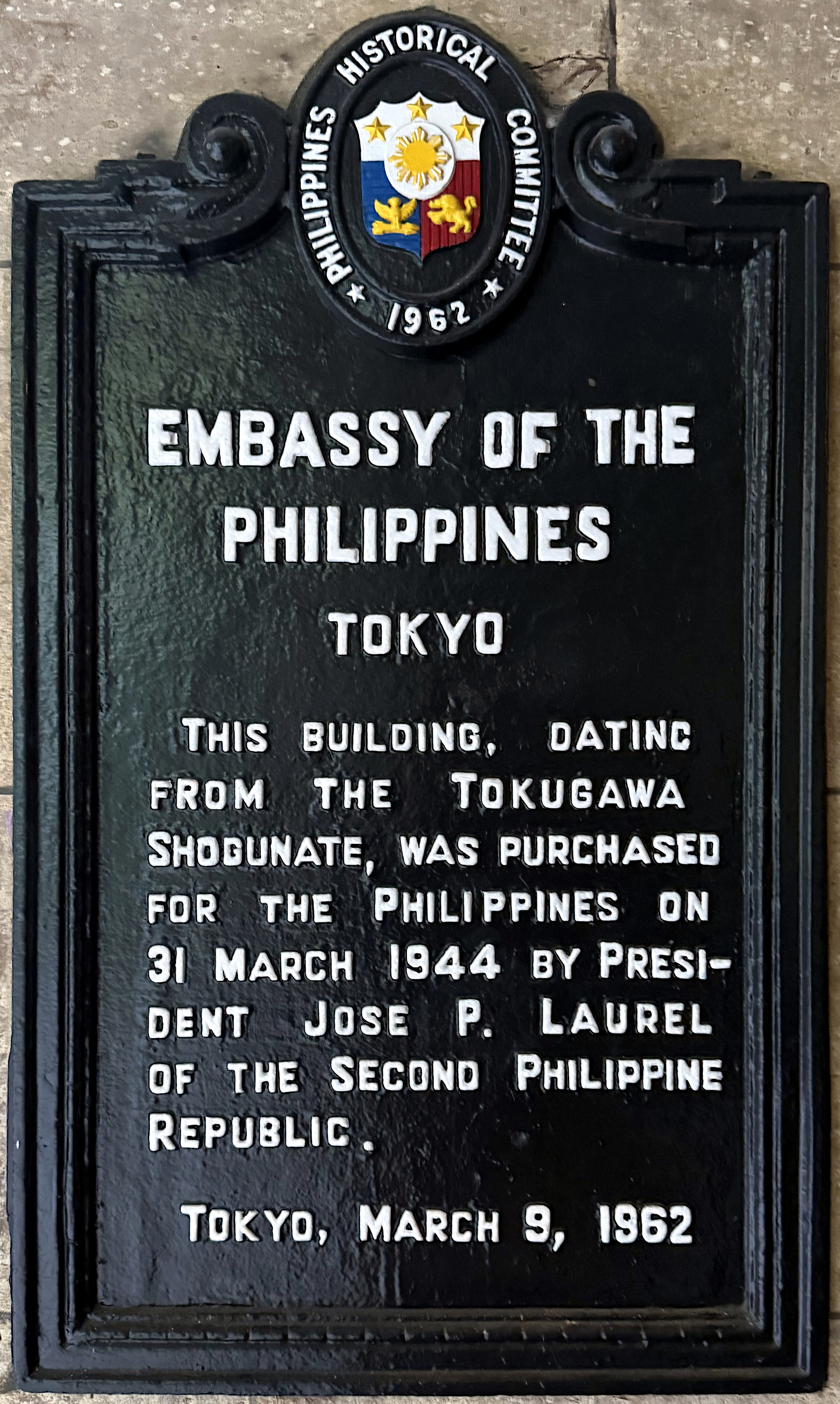
Philippine historical marker installed in 1962

Kudan is named after nearby Kudanzaka hilltop. Its address 1-1-1 Fujimi translates as “a view of Mt. Fuji.” The residence was built within a 4,500 square metres (48,000 sq ft) land in the Tokugawa shogunate, by Iwajiro Yasuda, a member of the family of prominent businessman Yasuda Zenjirō in the 1930s. It was originally known as the Yasuda Mansion. Zenjiro Yasuda founded Yasuda Zaibatsu and the Fuji group of companies. He is also the great-grandfather of artist Yoko Ono. Iwajiro, a painter, originally inherited a family home in Kamakura but decided to build a new house in Tokyo. He commissioned the Yokogawa Construction and Takenaka Corporation to build his new house. Tokisuke Yokogawa served as architect. Construction started in March 1933 and was completed in January 1935.

The building is built on the takadai or a high place in the city and is mainly patterned after Iberian styles and a mix of Renaissance, Gothic, Spanish, and Nippon styles. It was built using Japanese materials, including tiles from Toyama Prefecture. The design of the rooms were patterned after the hobbies of Yasuda's son.

World War II came and the Yasuda suffered financial problem. He sold his residence to President Jose P. Laurel for one million yen. Laurel bought the Yasuda property for the Philippine government in Tokyo on 31 March 1944. Since then, it served as the official residence of the Philippine ambassador to Tokyo and for socio-cultural affairs of Filipinos in Japan. Until 1958, the residence also served as the chancery of the Philippine Embassy in Tokyo.

On 9 March 1952, the National Historical Committee (precursor of NHCP), installed a commemorative plaque on Kudan which highlights the history of the building and its purchase by President Laurel in 1944.

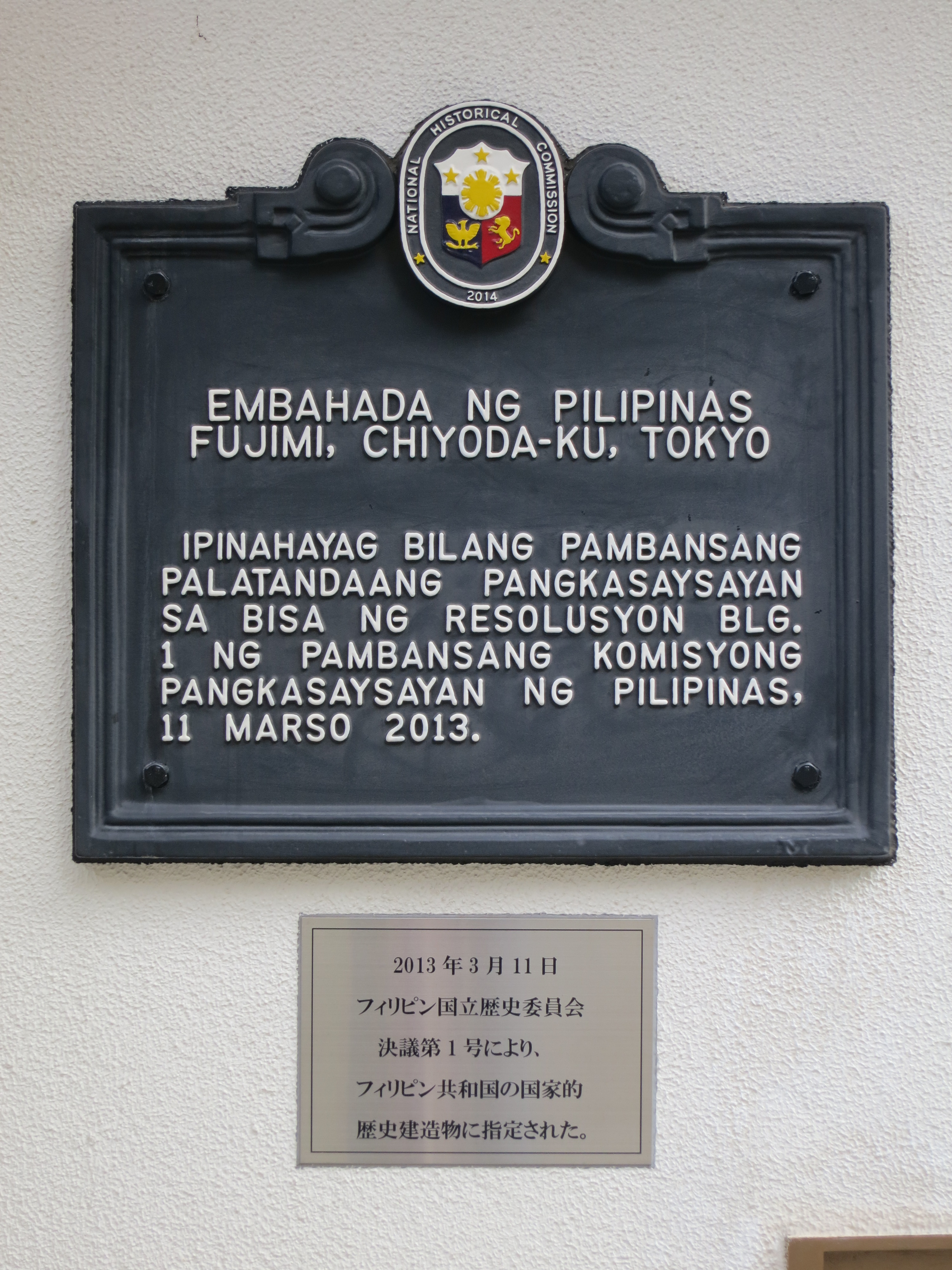
Historical marker installed by the National Historical Commission of the Philippines declaring the residence as a National Historical Landmark in 2013.

The National Historical Commission of the Philippines (NHCP) declared the Kudan property as a National Historical Landmark through signing Resolution no. 1, series of 2013. The unveiling of the marker happened on March 3, 2014, in the presence of Ambassador Lopez, NHCP chair Dr. Maria Serena Diokno, and Japanese and Filipino officials. Kudan is the first officially designated Philippine national historical landmark outside Philippine soil. In the unveiling of the marker, Lopez called the building as the crown jewel of Philippine foreign service.

== Features ==
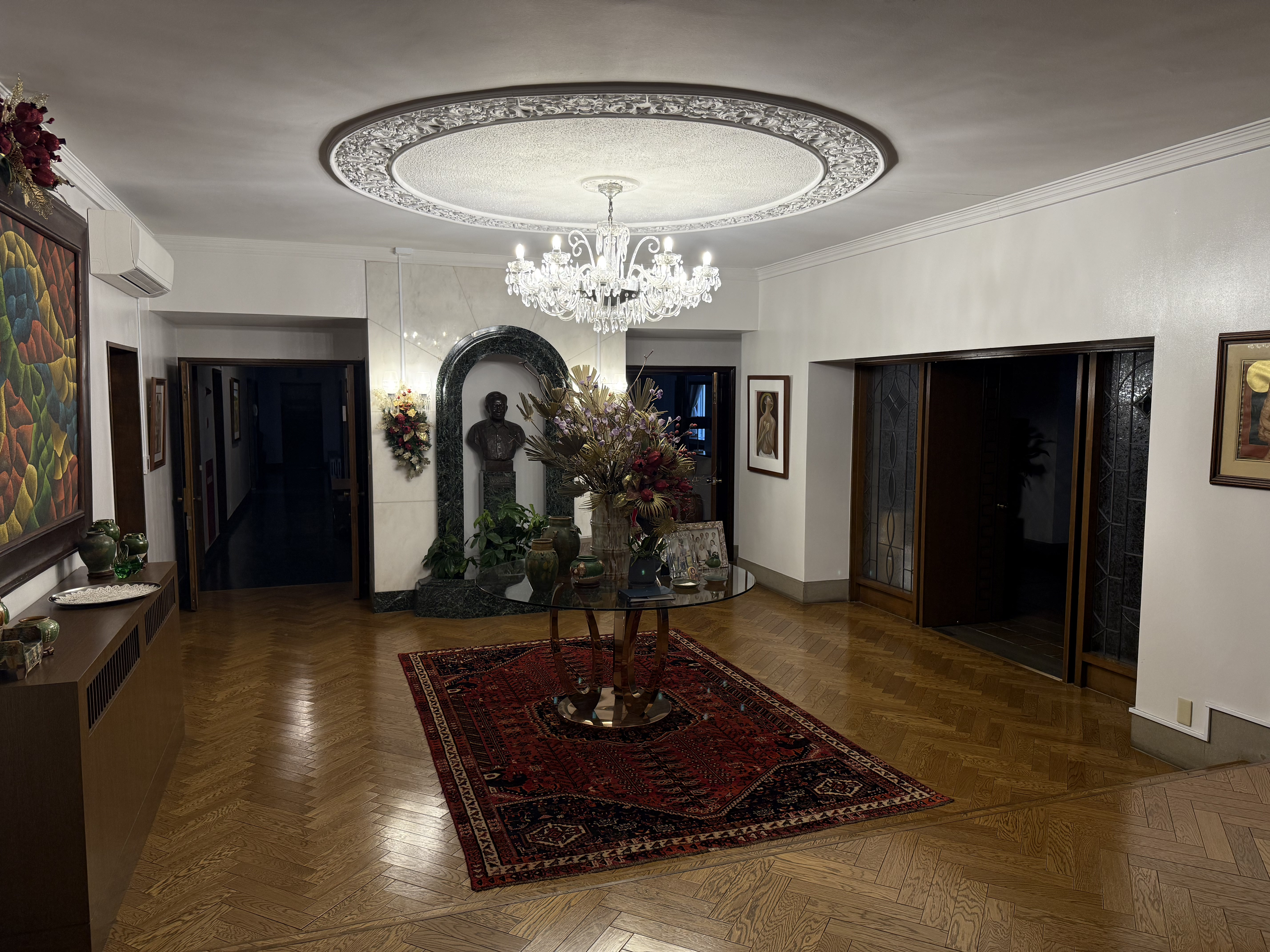
Foyer of the residence

Kudan consists of a basement, two storeys, and a watch tower. It is adjacent to the Tokyo Imperial Palace grounds and the Yasukuni Shrine. It boasts of its black ornate grill-gate and a Castilian rotunda, The roof tiles were also reminiscent of Castilian architecture. Located in the foyer are busts of Jose Rizal, Philippines' national hero and President Laurel. It has four function rooms on the ground floor: the diplomatic or blue room where guests are usually entertained; two dining rooms; and a music room. The second floor served as a private quarters of the ambassador and his family. Five other rooms on the second floor can be used by guests. Adjacent to the building is a garden where Princess Hitachi planted a sakura tree in 1994.

== In popular culture ==
In 2015, Philippine historian Ambeth Ocampo published the history of the Kudan entitled, History and Heritage of the Kudan: the Official Residence of the Philippine Ambassador to Japan. Its publication by ArtPost Asia is in time for the 60th anniversary of diplomatic relations with Japan.

== See also ==
- Embassy of the Philippines, Tokyo
- Japan–Philippines relations
- List of diplomatic missions of the Philippines
