= List of ambassadors of the Philippines to Argentina =

Ambassador of the Republic of the Philippines to the Argentine Republic
- Sugo ng Republika ng Pilipinas sa Republikang Arhentino; Embajador de la República de Filipinas en la República Argentina
- Seal of the Department of Foreign Affairs of the Philippines

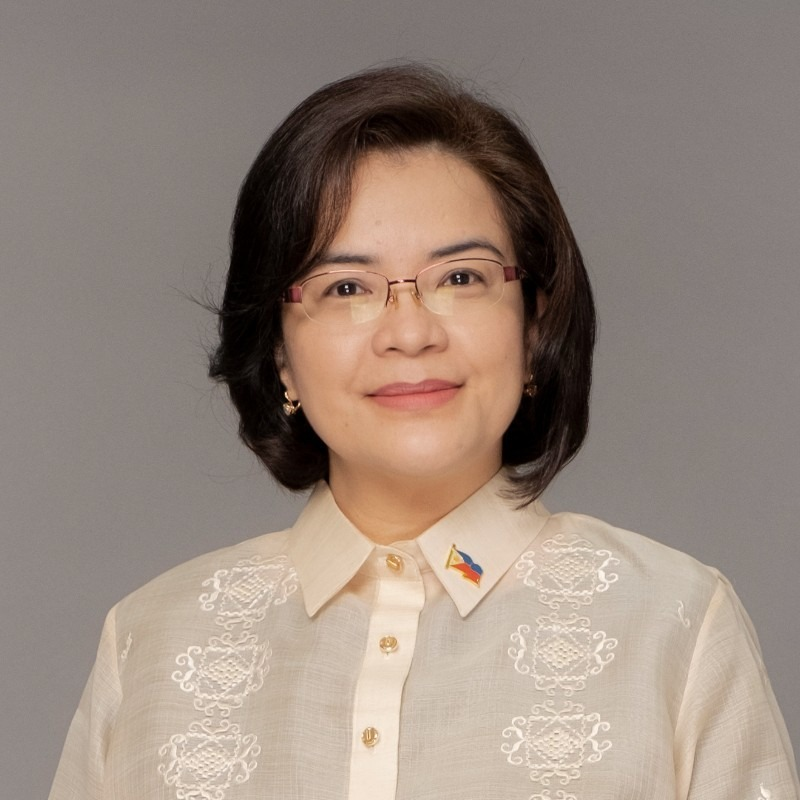
- Incumbent; Grace T. Cruz-Fabella since March 7, 2023
- Department of Foreign Affairs; Embassy of the Philippines, Buenos Aires
- Style: His/Her Excellency
- Reports to: Department of Foreign Affairs
- Seat: Buenos Aires, Argentina
- Nominator: Secretary of Foreign Affairs
- Appointer: President of the Philippines; with the advice and consent of the Commission on Appointments
- Term length: No fixed term
- Inaugural holder: Narciso Ramos (minister); Pedro Gil (ambassador)
- Formation: April 4, 1949
- Website: Philippine Embassy, Buenos Aires

The ambassador of the Republic of the Philippines to the Argentine Republic (Filipino: Sugo ng Republika ng Pilipinas sa Republika ng Argentina; Spanish: Embajador de la República de Filipinas en República Argentina) is the Republic of the Philippines' foremost diplomatic representative in Argentina. As head of the Philippines' diplomatic mission there, the Ambassador is the official representative of the president and the government of the Philippines to the president and government of Argentina. The position has the rank and status of an ambassador extraordinary and plenipotentiary and is based at the embassy located in Buenos Aires, the capital of the country.

This ambassador post is also accredited as a non-resident ambassador to the countries of Bolivia, Paraguay, and Uruguay.

== Heads of mission ==
Image	Head of mission	Tenure	Argentine president	Philippine president	Note(s)
	Narciso Ramos	April 4, 1949 – 1952	Juan Perón	Manuel Roxas; Elpidio Quirino	He would later serve as the ambassador of India and the Secretary of Foreign Affairs from 1965 to 1968.
	Pedro Gil	November 1956 – March 1962	Juan Perón; Eduardo Lonardi; Pedro Eugenio Aramburu; Arturo Frondizi; José María Guido	Elpidio Quirino; Ramon Magsaysay; Carlos P. Garcia; Diosdado Macapagal	Initially served as Minister Plenipotentiary until 1960 when the legation elevated into an embassy. Credentials were presented on 8 September 1960.
	Luis Moreno Salcedo	1962–1964	José María Guido; Arturo Umberto Illia	Diosdado Macapagal	He would later serve as ambassador to numerous European countries including France and the former Soviet Union, as well as the permanent representative to the United Nations.
	Tomas G. de Castro	Unknown	Arturo Umberto Illia; Juan Carlos Onganía; Roberto Marcelo Levingston; Alejandro Agustín Lanusse; Héctor José Cámpora; Raúl Alberto Lastiri; Juan Perón; Isabel Perón	Diosdado Macapagal; Ferdinand Marcos	
	Pelayo F. Llamas	September 1976 – June 1981	Isabel Perón; Jorge Rafael Videla; Roberto Eduardo Viola; Horacio Tomás Liendo (Interim)	Ferdinand Marcos	
	Trinidad Q. Alconcel	February 1984 – February 1986	Carlos Lacoste; Leopoldo Galtieri; Alfredo Oscar Saint Jean; Reynaldo Bignone; Raúl Alfonsín	Ferdinand Marcos; Corazon Aquino	
	Sime D. Hidalgo	September 1986 – July 1992	Raúl Alfonsín; Carlos Menem	Corazon Aquino; Fidel V. Ramos	
	Carlos Alberto O. Villa Abrille	April 1993 – February 2002	Carlos Menem; Fernando de la Rúa; Ramón Puerta (Interim); Adolfo Rodríguez Saá (Interim); Eduardo Duhalde (Interim)	Fidel V. Ramos; Joseph Estrada; Gloria Macapagal Arroyo	
	George B. Reyes	May 2002 – April 2006	Eduardo Duhalde (Interim); Néstor Kirchner	Gloria Macapagal Arroyo	
	Rey A. Carandang	January 2009 – 2014	Cristina Fernández de Kirchner	Gloria Macapagal Arroyo; Benigno Aquino III	
	Ma. Amelita C. Aquino	2014 – 2017	Cristina Fernández de Kirchner; Mauricio Macri	Benigno Aquino III; Rodrigo Duterte	
	Linglingay F. Lacanlale	August 2018 – June 30, 2022	Mauricio Macri; Alberto Fernández	Rodrigo Duterte	Credentials were presented to Argentine President Mauricio Macri on 21 August 2018, and to Paraguayan President Mario Abdo Benitez on 4 June 2019.
	Grace T. Cruz-Fabella	March 7, 2023 – present	Alberto Fernández; Javier Milei	Bongbong Marcos	Credentials were presented to Argentine President Alberto Fernández on 7 March 2023.
Source: Embassy of the Republic of the Philippines, Buenos Aires

== See also ==
- Argentina–Philippines relations
