= List of ambassadors of Japan to the Philippines =

Ambassador of Japan to the Republic of the Philippines
- 駐フィリピン共和国日本国大使; Chū firipinkyōwakoku Nipponkoku taishi Sugo ng Hapon sa Republika ng Pilipinas
- Imperial Seal of Japan
- Incumbent; Katsuro Kitagawa since 1 October 2026
- Style: His Excellency
- Seat: 2627 Roxas Boulevard, Pasay, Metro Manila, Philippines
- Appointer: Emperor of Japan
- Term length: No fixed term
- Inaugural holder: Ukemichi Yatabe (consul general); Shōzō Murata (ambassador extraordinary and plenipotentiary)
- Formation: 16 November 1888 (consulate); 14 October 1943 (ambassador extraordinary and plenipotentiary)
- Website: Japanese Embassy, Manila

The ambassador of Japan to the Philippines (Japanese: 駐フィリピン共和国日本国大使, romanized: Chū firipinkyōwakoku Nipponkoku taishi; Filipino: Sugo ng Hapon sa Pilipinas) is the head of the Japanese diplomatic mission in the Philippines and the official representative of the government of Japan to the government of the Philippines. Diplomatic relations between the Philippines and Japan began in 1888 when a Japanese consulate was established in Manila, and it was upgraded to an embassy in 1943, right after the inauguration of the Second Philippine Republic. Relations were suspended in 1945, after the surrender of Japan to the Allied forces, and the post remained dormant until 1952, when the Japanese government sent its minister to Manila. On 23 July 1956, the position of ambassador was reestablished after the ratification of the Peace Treaty and Reparations Agreement between the Philippines and Japan.

The embassy of Japan in the Philippines is based in Pasay City, Metro Manila. The position has the rank of Ambassador extraordinary and plenipotentiary.

== List of ambassadors ==
=== Consuls and consuls general during the Spanish and American colonial periods ===
Head of mission	Tenure begins	Tenure ends	Japanese emperor	Japanese prime minister	Accredited during the Government of	Note(s)
Atsushi Kimura	1931	1935	Hirohito	Hamaguchi Osachi; Kijūrō Shidehara; Wakatsuki Reijirō; Inukai Tsuyoshi; Takahashi Korekiyo; Saitō Makoto; Keisuke Okada	Frank Murphy (as Governor-General of the Philippines; later High Commissioner to the Philippines)	First Secretary of the Japanese Legation at Warsaw, Poland, on 4 May 1935.
Kiyoshi Uchiyama	1935	1943	Hirohito	Keisuke Okada; Fumio Gotō; Kōki Hirota; Senjūrō Hayashi; Fumimaro Konoe; Kiichirō Hiranuma; Nobuyuki Abe; Mitsumasa Yonai; Fumimaro Konoe; Hideki Tōjō	Manuel L. Quezon (as President of the Commonwealth of the Philippines)	Credentials were presented on July 19, 1935.

=== Ambassadors ===
Head of mission	Tenure begins	Tenure ends	Japanese emperor	Japanese prime minister	Philippine president	Notes
Shōzō Murata	1943	1945	Hirohito	Hideki Tōjō; Kuniaki Koiso; Kantarō Suzuki; Naruhiko Higashikuni; Kijūrō Shidehara	Jose P. Laurel (as President of the Second Philippine Republic); Sergio Osmeña (as President of the Commonwealth of the Philippines) (Note: Until 1945, Laurel served as President of the Second Philippine Republic (of which the former served as a puppet state of Imperial Japan), while Osmeña served as the president of the government in exile.)	
Diplomatic relations were suspended until 1952 due to the surrender of Japan to the Allied forces. The post was re-established in 1952 as minister plenipotentiary. In 1956, the post was elevated to ambassador status as the Philippines and Japan resumed their diplomatic relations, and their friendship agreement was signed.
Tōru Nakagawa	1952	1953	Hirohito	Hitoshi Ashida; Shigeru Yoshida |	Elpidio Quirino	
Katsumi Ōno	1953	1955	Hirohito	Shigeru Yoshida; Ichirō Hatoyama	Elpidio Quirino; Ramon Magsaysay	
Kōichirō Asakai	1956	1957	Hirohito	Tanzan Ishibashi; Nobusuke Kishi	Ramon Magsaysay	Recalled to the home service on 17 June 1957.
Morio Yukawa	1957	1961	Hirohito	Nobusuke Kishi; Hayato Ikeda	Carlos P. Garcia	
Jun Tsuchiya	1961	1962	Hirohito	Hayato Ikeda; Eisaku Satō	Diosdado Macapagal	
Osamu Itagaki	1962	1965	Hirohito	Hayato Ikeda; Eisaku Satō	Diosdado Macapagal	Credentials were presented on 6 June 1962.
Harumi Takeuchi	1965	1967	Hirohito	Eisaku Satō; Kakuei Tanaka	Ferdinand Marcos	
Masao Kanazawa	1967	1968	Hirohito	Eisaku Satō; Kakuei Tanaka	Ferdinand Marcos	
Takeshi Yasukawa	1968	1969	Hirohito	Eisaku Satō; Kakuei Tanaka	Ferdinand Marcos	Conferred the Order of Sikatuna on 18 November 1969.
Toshio Urabe	1969	1974	Hirohito	Eisaku Satō; Kakuei Tanaka	Ferdinand Marcos	Conferred the Order of Sikatuna on 16 July 1974.
Masao Sawaki	1974	1977	Hirohito	Takeo Miki; Takeo Fukuda	Ferdinand Marcos	
Kiyohisa Miwa	1977	1979	Hirohito	Takeo Fukuda; Masayoshi Ōhira; Masayoshi Ito; Zenkō Suzuki; Yasuhiro Nakasone	Ferdinand Marcos	
Hideho Tanaka	1980	1983	Hirohito	Takeo Fukuda; Masayoshi Ōhira; Masayoshi Ito; Zenkō Suzuki; Yasuhiro Nakasone	Ferdinand Marcos	
Yoshio Okawa	1983	1985	Hirohito	Yasuhiro Nakasone; Noboru Takeshita	Ferdinand Marcos	
Kiyoshi Sumiya	1985	1988	Hirohito	Yasuhiro Nakasone; Noboru Takeshita	Ferdinand Marcos; Corazon Aquino	Conferred the Order of Sikatuna on 16 February 1988.
Tsuneo Tanaka	1988	1990	Hirohito; Akihito	Noboru Takeshita; Sōsuke Uno; Toshiki Kaifu	Corazon Aquino	Conferred the Order of Sikatuna on 16 October 1990.
Toshio Goto	1990	1992	Akihito	Toshiki Kaifu; Kiichi Miyazawa	Corazon Aquino	Credentials were presented during the week of 4–11 November 1990.
Hirokazu Arai	1992	1994	Akihito	Kiichi Miyazawa; Morihiro Hosokawa; Tsutomu Hata; Tomiichi Murayama	Corazon Aquino; Fidel V. Ramos	
Yoshifumi Matsuda	1994	1996	Akihito	Tomiichi Murayama	Fidel V. Ramos	
Hiroyuki Yushita	1996	1999	Akihito	Ryutaro Hashimoto; Keizō Obuchi	Fidel V. Ramos; Joseph Estrada	
Yoshihisa Ara	1999	2002	Akihito	Keizō Obuchi; Yoshirō Mori; Junichiro Koizumi	Joseph Estrada; Gloria Macapagal Arroyo	Conferred the Order of Sikatuna on 15 April 2002.
Kojiro Takano	2002	2004	Akihito	Junichiro Koizumi; Shinzo Abe; Yasuo Fukuda	Gloria Macapagal Arroyo	Conferred the Order of Sikatuna on 13 October 2004.
Ryuichiro Yamazaki	2004	2007	Akihito	Junichiro Koizumi; Shinzo Abe; Yasuo Fukuda	Gloria Macapagal Arroyo	
Makoto Katsura	2007	2011	Akihito	Yasuo Fukuda; Tarō Asō; Yukio Hatoyama; Naoto Kan; Yoshihiko Noda	Gloria Macapagal Arroyo; Benigno Aquino III	Credentials were presented on 2 October 2007.
Toshinao Urabe	2011	2014	Akihito	Yoshihiko Noda; Shinzo Abe	Benigno S. Aquino III	
Kazuhide Ishikawa	2014	2017	Akihito	Shinzo Abe; Yoshihide Suga	Benigno Aquino III; Rodrigo Duterte	Credentials were presented on 27 November 2014.
Kouji Haneda	2017	2020	Akihito; Naruhito	Shinzo Abe; Yoshihide Suga	Rodrigo Duterte	Credentials were presented on 25 October 2017.
Kazuhiko Koshikawa	2020	2024	Naruhito	Yoshihide Suga; Fumio Kishida	Rodrigo Duterte; Bongbong Marcos	Credentials were presented on 14 December 2020.
Kazuya Endo	2024	2026	Naruhito	Fumio Kishida; Shigeru Ishiba; Sanae Takaichi	Bongbong Marcos	Credentials were presented on 4 April 2024.
Katsuro Kitagawa	2026	present	Naruhito	Sanae Takaichi	Bongbong Marcos	Credentials were presented on 1 October 2026.

== See also ==
- Embassy of the Philippines, Tokyo
- List of ambassadors of the Philippines to Japan
- Japan–Philippines relations
- Foreign relations of the Philippines
- Foreign relations of Japan
