= Order of Sikatuna =

Philippine order

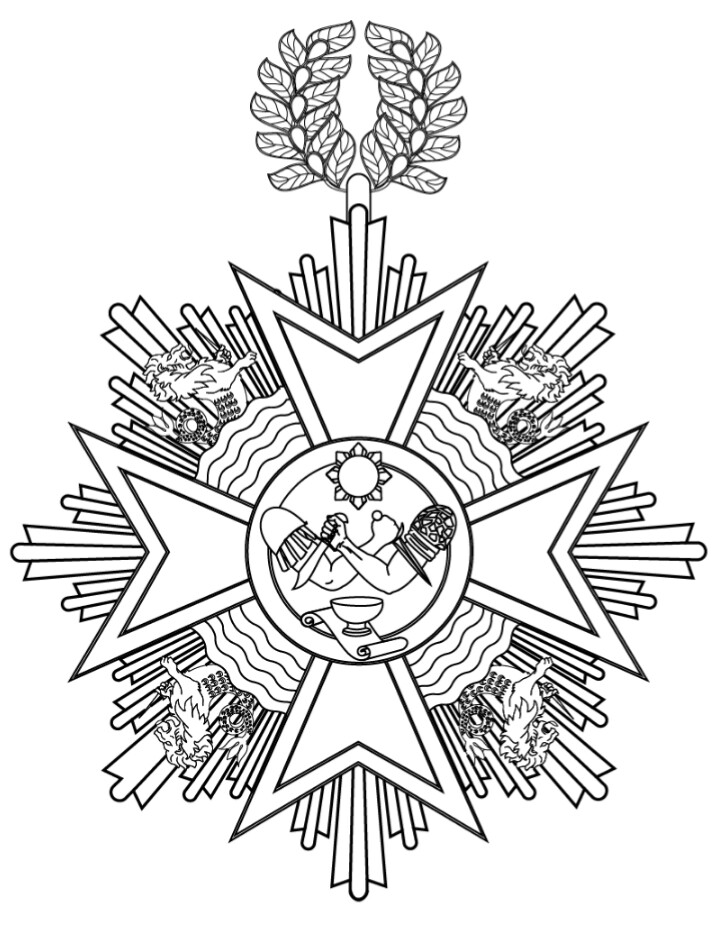
- Insignia of the order

Awarded by Philippines
- Type: Order
- Awarded for: rending exceptional and meritorious services to the Republic of the Philippines; to diplomats, officials and nationals of foreign states who have rendered conspicuous services in fostering, developing and strengthening relations between their country and the Philippines
- Status: Currently constituted
- Grades: Grand Collar; Grand Cross, gold distinction Grand Cross, silver distinction Grand Officer; Commander; Officer; Member

Precedence
- Next (higher): Quezon Service Cross
- Next (lower): Order of Gabriela Silang
- Related: Order of Lakandula; Philippine Legion of Honor
- Ribbon bar of the order

The Order of Sikatuna (Filipino: Orden ng Sikatuna) is the national order of diplomatic merit of the Republic of the Philippines. It is conferred upon individuals who have rendered exceptional and meritorious services to the Republic of the Philippines, upon diplomats, officials and nationals of foreign states who have rendered conspicuous services in fostering, developing and strengthening relations between their country and the Philippines, or upon personnel of the Philippine Department of Foreign Affairs (DFA), both in the Home Office and in the Foreign Service.

The Order of Sikatuna may be awarded by the Secretary of Foreign Affairs in the name and by authority of the President.

== History ==
The Order of Sikatuna was established by President Elpidio Quirino through Executive Order No. 571 dated February 27, 1953. Section 2 of the executive order states, "The Order of Sikatuna [...] commemorates the first treaty (Pacto de Sangre) between the Philippines and a foreign country..." In the Quirino order, the Order of Sikatuna commemorates the pacto de sangre or blood compact, more popularly known as sandugo. This was, according to the Executive Order, the first international treaty of friendship between Bohol native chieftain, Datu Sikatuna and Spanish conquistador Miguel López de Legazpi, between a Filipino and Spaniard. Lately, however, the Executive Order's premise has been put to question. The event was not the first blood compact since the first recorded happened 44 years before between Ferdinand Magellan, representing the Spanish crown, and raia Siaiu, king of the island-port of Mazaua. Magellan called the ceremony "casi casi", a Malayan term meaning "to be one and the same thing" or to be blood brothers. At the same time the first recorded Treaty of Peace was entered into on Tuesday, April 9, 1521, by datu Humabon of Cebu and Magellan.

The Order of Sikatuna's composition was expanded from the original four classes by Presidents Diosdado Macapagal and again by Ferdinand E. Marcos. In 2003, President Gloria Macapagal Arroyo reformed the Philippine system of orders, medals, and decorations, through Executive Order No. 236, known as the Honors Code of the Philippines which codified the civilian orders, decorations and medals of the Republic of the Philippines. Among its provisions was one renaming the order as simply, "The Order of Sikatuna," and clarifying its protocolar standing.

== Ranks ==
- Grand Collar (GCS) (Raja) – Conferred upon a former or incumbent Head of State and/or of government
- Grand Cross (GCrS) (Datu) – The Grand Cross shall have two distinctions: (i) Gold (Katangiang Ginto) and (ii) Silver (Katangiang Pilak). The Grand Cross may be conferred upon a Crown Prince, Vice President, Senate President, Speaker of the House, Chief Justice or the equivalent, foreign minister or other official of cabinet rank, Ambassador, Undersecretary, Assistant Secretary, or other person of a rank similar or equivalent to the foregoing
- Grand Officer (GOS) (Maringal na Lakan) – Conferred upon a Chargé d'affaires, e.p., Minister, Minister Counselor, Consul General heading a consular post, executive director, or other person of a rank similar or equivalent to the foregoing
- Commander (CS) (Lakan) – Conferred upon a Chargé d'affaires a.i., Counselor, First Secretary, Consul General in the consular section of an Embassy, Consular officer with a personal rank higher than Second Secretary, Director, or other person of a rank similar or equivalent to the foregoing
- Officer (OS) (Maginoo) – Conferred upon a Second Secretary, Consul, assistant director, or other person of a rank similar or equivalent to the foregoing
- Member (MS) (Maharlika) – Conferred upon a Third Secretary, Vice Consul, Attaché, Principal Assistant, or other person of a rank similar or equivalent to the foregoing

=== Ribbon bars ===
==== 1953–2003 ====
Order of Sikatuna Ribbon Bars (1953–2003)
Member	Officer	Commander	Grand Officer	Grand Cross	Grand Collar

==== Since 2003 ====
Order of Sikatuna Ribbon Bars (since 2003)
Member	Officer	Commander	Grand Officer	Grand Cross	Grand Collar

== Awardees ==
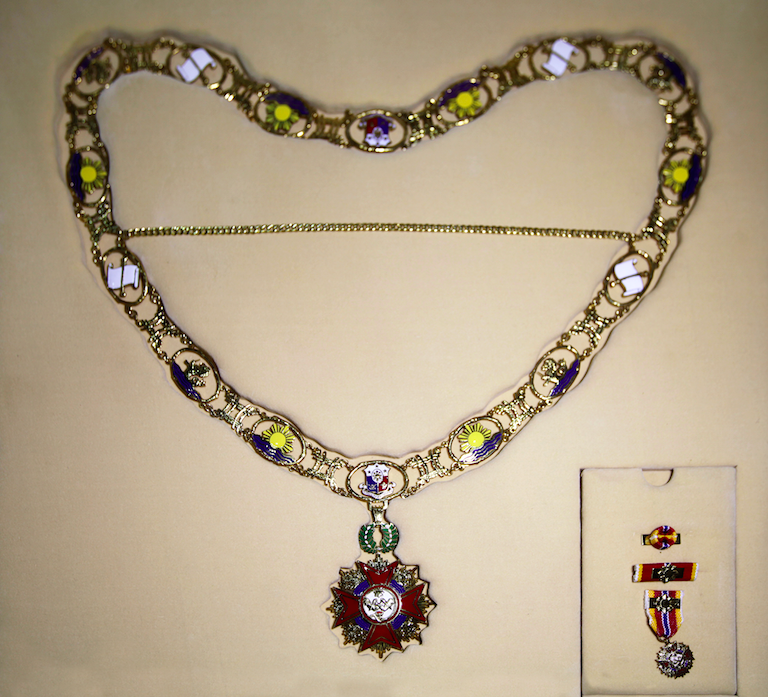
Grand Collar and miniature with ribbon bar of the Order of Sikatuna.

=== Ambassadors ===
- Aftab Ahmad Khan - Ambassador of Pakistan to the Philippines, Rank of Datu, 1986.
- Pedro Ortiz-Armengol - Ambassador of Spain to the Philippines, Rank of Datu, 1986.
- Stephen W. Bosworth - Ambassador of the United States to the Philippines, Rank of Datu, 1987.
- Pasi Rutanen - Ambassador of Finland to the Philippines, Rank of Datu, 1987.
- Knut Mørkved - Ambassador of Norway to the Philippines, Rank of Datu, 1987.
- Kiyoshi Sumiya - Ambassador of Japan to the Philippines, Rank of Datu, 1988.
- Eberhard Kunz - Ambassador of Germany to the Philippines, Rank of Datu, 1989.
- Bruno Torpigliani - Apostolic Nuncio to the Philippines, Rank of Datu, 1990.
- Tsuneo Tanaka - Ambassador of Japan to the Philippines, Rank of Datu, 1990.
- Nicholas Platt - Ambassador of the United States to the Philippines, Rank of Datu, 1991.
- Edward Lee Kwong Foo - Ambassador of Singapore to the Philippines, Rank of Datu, 1993.
- Rodolfo Severino, Jr. - Secretary-General of the Association of Southeast Asian Nations (ASEAN), Rank of Datu, 1997, Rank of Raja, November 2001.
- Malai Ahmad Murad - Ambassador of Brunei to the Philippines, Rank of Datu, 1996.
- U San Thein - Ambassador of Myanmar to the Philippines, Rank of Datu, 1999.
- Robert Collette - Ambassador of Canada to the Philippines, Rank of Datu, 2003.
- Herbert Jess - Ambassador of Germany to the Philippines, Rank of Datu, 2004.
- Francis J. Ricciardone, Jr. - Ambassador of the United States to the Philippines, Rank of Datu, 2005.
- Stanislav Slavicky - Ambassador of the Czech Republic to the Philippines, Rank of Datu, 2005.
- Wu Hongbo - Ambassador of China to the Philippines, Rank of Datu, 2005.
- Iskandar Bin Sarudin - Ambassador of Malaysia to the Philippines, Rank of Datu, 2006.
- Joao Jose Gomes Caetano da Silva - Ambassador of Portugal to the Philippines, Rank of Datu, 2006.
- Graeme Matheson - Ambassador to New Zealand to the Philippines, Rank of Datu, Gold Distinction, 2011.
- Robert Gerard Brinks - Ambassador of the Netherlands to the Philippines, Rank of Datu, Silver Distinction, 2012.
- Alcides G. R. Prates - Ambassador of Brazil to the Philippines, Rank of Datu, Silver Distinction, 2012.
- Wadee Al-Batti - Ambassador of the Iraq to the Philippines, Rank of Datu, Silver Distinction, 2013.
- Harry K. Thomas Jr. - Ambassador of the United States to the Philippines, Rank of Datu, 2013.
- Christopher Thornley - Ambassador of Canada to the Philippines, Rank of Datu, 2013.
- Yohanes K Legowo, Ambassador of the Republic of Indonesia to the Philippines, Rank of Datu, 2014
- Bill Tweddell - Ambassador of Australia to the Philippines, Rank of Datu, Gold Distinction, 2016.
- Dato Mohd Zamri bin Mohd Kassim - Ambassador of Malaysia to the Philippines, Rank of Datu, Gold Distinction, 2016.
- Johny Lumintang, Ambassador of the Republic of Indonesia to the Philippines, Rank of Datu, Silver Distinction, 2017
- Erik Førner - Ambassador of Norway to the Philippines, Rank of Datu, 2018.
- Jaroslav Olša, Jr. - Ambassador of the Czech Republic to the Philippines, Rank of Datu, Gold Distinction, 2018.
- Amanda Gorely - Ambassador of Australia to the Philippines, Rank of Datu, Silver Distinction, 2018.
- Dato’ Razlan Abdul Rashid - Ambassador of Malaysia to the Philippines, Rank of Datu, Silver Distinction, 2018.
- Jan Top Christensen - Ambassador of Denmark to the Philippines, Rank of Datu, Gold Distinction, 2019
- Archbishop Gabriele Giordano Caccia - Apostolic Nuncio to the Philippines and Dean of the Diplomatic Corps, Rank of Datu, Gold Distinction, 2019.
- Koji Haneda - Ambassador of Japan to the Philippines, Rank of Datu, Gold Distinction, 2020.
- Dr. Jozsef Bencze - Ambassador to Hungary to the Philippines, Rank of Datu, Gold Distinction, 2020.
- Sinyo Harry Sarundajang, Ambassador of the Republic of Indonesia to the Philippines, Rank of Datu, Gold Distinction, Posthumous, 2021
- Saskia de Lang - Ambassador of the Kingdom of the Netherlands to the Philippines, Rank of Datu, Silver Distinction, 2022.
- Hae Kyong (HK) Yu - Ambassador of Australia to the Philippines, Rank of Datu, Gold Distinction, 2025.
- Dr Titanilla Tóth - Ambassador of Hungary to the Philippines, Rank of Datu, Silver Distinction, 2026
- Endo Kazuya – Ambassador of Japan to the Philippines, Grand Cross with Distinction, 2026.

=== Heads of states and governments ===
- Plaek Phibunsongkhram - Prime Minister of Thailand, 1955
- Ngo Dinh Diem - 1st President of the Republic of Vietnam, 1956
- King Norodom Sihanouk of Cambodia, 1956
- Generalissimo Chiang Kai-shek - President of the Republic of China, 1960
- Dwight D. Eisenhower - 34th President of the United States, 1960
- Syed Putra of Perlis - Yang di-Pertuan Agong of Malaysia, 1961
- Crown Prince Akihito of Japan, 1962
- Generalissimo Francisco Franco - Head of the Spanish State, 1962
- Antonio Segni - 4th President of Italy, 1962
- King Rama IX of Thailand, 1963
- Heinrich Lübke - 6th President of Germany, 1964
- Philibert Tsiranana - 1st President of the Malagasy Republic, 1964
- Hirohito, 1966
- Suharto - 2nd President of Indonesia, 1968
- King Mahendra of Nepal, 1971
- Lee Kuan Yew - 1st Prime Minister of Singapore, 1974
- Kakuei Tanaka - Prime Minister of Japan, 1974
- Juan Carlos de Borbon - Prince of Spain, 1974
- Nicolae Ceaușescu - 1st President of Romania, 1975
- Dr. Benjamin Sheares - 2nd President of Singapore, 1976
- King Hussein of Jordan, 1976
- Kriangsak Chamanan - Prime Minister of Thailand, 1978
- Fra' Angelo de Mojana di Cologna - 77th Prince and Grand Master of the Sovereign Military Order of Malta, 1979
- Yasuhiro Nakasone - Prime Minister of Japan, 1983
- Raúl Alfonsín - President of Argentina, 1986
- Virgilio Barco Vargas - 27th President of Colombia, 1987
- Muhammad Khan Junejo - 10th Prime Minister of Pakistan, 1988
- Francesco Cossiga - 8th President of Italy, 1988
- Sultan Hassanal Bolkiah of Brunei Darrussalam, 1988
- François Mitterrand - 21st President of France, 1989
- Chuan Leekpai - Prime Minister of Thailand, 1993
- Kim Young-sam - 7th President of South Korea, 1994
- Ja'afar of Negeri Sembilan - Yang di-Pertuan Agong of Malaysia, 1995
- Ernesto Pérez Balladares - 33rd President of Panama, 1995
- Carlos Menem - President of Argentina, 1995
- Eduardo Frei Ruiz-Tagle - 31st President of Chile, 1995
- Konstantinos Stephanopoulos - President of Greece, 1997
- Khalifa bin Salman Al Khalifa - 1st Prime Minister of Bahrain, 2001
- Ion Iliescu - 2nd President of Romania, 2002
- Crown Prince Naruhito of Japan, 2002
- George W. Bush - 43rd President of the United States, 2003
- Barack Obama - 44th President of the United States, 2014
- Susilo Bambang Yudhoyono - 6th President of Indonesia, 2015
- Shinzo Abe - Prime Minister of Japan, 2015
- Fra' Matthew Festing - 79th Prince and Grand Master of the Sovereign Military Order of Malta, 2015
- Takeo Fukuda - Prime Minister of Japan, 2017

=== Others ===
- Alberto Martín-Artajo - Foreign Minister of Spain, Rank of Lakan, 1953
- Carlos P. Romulo - Filipino diplomat, Rank of Maharlika, 1953, Rank of Rajah, 1982
- Vũ Văn Mẫu - Foreign Minister of South Vietnam, Rank of Lakan, 1956
- Narciso Ramos - former Secretary of Foreign Affairs, Rank of Datu, 1970
- Carl Albert - Speaker of the United States House of Representatives, Rank of Lakan, 1971
- Kim Yong-shik - Foreign Minister of South Korea, Rank of Datu, 1972
- Maraden Panggabean - 15th Minister of Defence of Indonesia, Rank of Datu, 1972
- Goh Keng Swee - Minister of Defence of Singapore, Rank of Datu, 1972
- Mochtar Kusumaatmadja - Minister of Foreign Affairs of Indonesia, Rank of Datu, 1980
- Washington SyCip - Filipino businessman, Rank of Maginoo, 1980
- Taha Muhie-eldin Marouf - Vice President of Iraq, Rank of Raja, 1982
- Dante Caputo - 99th Minister of Foreign Affairs and Worship of Argentina, 1986
- Emmanuel Pelaez - Filipino diplomat, Rank of Datu, 1987
- Luis Moreno Salcedo - Filipino diplomat, Rank of Datu, 1987
- Salvador P. Lopez - Filipino diplomat, Rank of Datu, 1987
- José Laurel III - Filipino diplomat, Rank of Datu, 1987
- Giulio Andreotti - 17th Minister of Foreign Affairs of Italy, Rank of Datu, 1988
- Hiroshi Nakajima - Regional Director of the World Health Organization Western Pacific Region, Rank of Datu, 1988
- Carlos Lopez Contreras - Minister of Foreign Affairs of Honduras, Rank of Datu, 1988
- Abel Matutes - Member of the Commission of the European Communities of Spain, Rank of Datu, 1990
- Francisco Fernández Ordóñez - Foreign Minister of Spain, Rank of Datu, 1990
- Eudaldo Mirapeix - Director General for North America and Asia of the Spanish Foreign Ministry, Rank of Lakan, 1990
- Enrique Silva Cimma - Foreign Minister of Chile, Rank of Datu, 1990
- Javier Solana - Foreign Minister of Spain, Rank of Datu, 1994
- Domingo Lucenario Jr. - Filipino diplomat, Rank of Datu, Gold Distinction, 2009.
- Jerril Santos - Filipino diplomat, Rank of Datu, Gold Distinction, 2009.
- Enrique Manalo - Filipino diplomat, Rank of Datu, Gold Distinction, 2010.
- Bernardita Catalla - former Philippine Ambassador to Lebanon, Rank of Datu, Gold Distinction, 2020.
- Douglas MacArthur - General of the Army, Field Marshal of the Philippines, and Supreme Commander for the Allied Powers, Rank of Lakan
- Wassim Nanaa - Honorary Consul General of the Philippines in Aleppo Syria Rank of Grand Officer
- Jaime Sin - Archbishop of Manila
- Ali Alatas - 13th Foreign Minister of Indonesia, Rank of Raja, 1999
- Manny Pacquiao -Filipino boxer
- Chuan Leekpai - Former Prime Minister of Thailand
- Mohammad Mohsin - former Bangladeshi Foreign Secretary, Rank of Datu
- Johannes de Kok - European Commission head of delegation, Rank of Grand Cross Datu (Gold Distinction)
- Rafael E. Seguis - Foreign Affairs Undersecretary for Special Concerns, Rank of Datu
- Tadao Chino - President, Asian Development Bank, Grand Cross
- Patrick Pichi Sun - Ambassador for the Republic of China
- Ban Ki-moon - Secretary-General of the United Nations (Korea)
- Hillary Clinton - US Secretary of State
- Jose T. Almonte - former National Security Advisor to President Fidel V. Ramos
- Daniel Inouye - United States Senator, rank of Datu
- George Yeo - Former Minister of Foreign Affairs of Singapore, with rank of Datu
- Sadako Ogata - Former United Nations High Commissioner for Refugees.
- Khalifa bin Salman Al Khalifa - Prime Minister of Bahrain
- Gloria Steele - Mission Director, USAID/Philippines
- Takehiko Nakao - President, Asian Development Bank, Grand Cross.
- Haruhiko Kuroda - President, Asian Development Bank.
- Johannes Leimena, Deputy Prime Minister of Indonesia, Rank of Lakan
- Alamsyah Ratu Perwiranegara, Minister of Religion, Rank of Lakan
- Hassan Wirajuda, 15th Foreign Minister of Indonesia, Rank of Datu, 2008
- Ibrahim Ismail, Sultan of Johor, Rank of Datu, 2019
- Yasmin Umar, Deputy Defence Minister of Brunei, Rank of Datu, 2008

This article incorporates public domain text from the library of the Philippine Congress.

== See also ==
- Sandugo
- Sandugo Festival
