= Kōichirō Asakai =

Japanese diplomat (1906–1995)

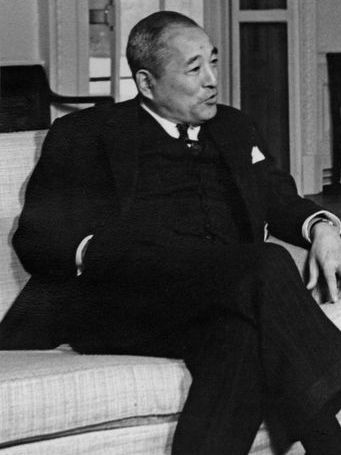

Kōichirō Asakai (Japanese: 朝海浩一郎; 1906–1995) was a Japanese diplomat who served as ambassador to the United States and ambassador to the Philippines.

Asakai studied banking and graduated from Hitotsubashi University in 1929, before joining the Foreign Ministry. He was taught English by Edward Gauntlett, an English language teacher from Wales. From 1929 until 1931, he studied law at the University of Edinburgh. He became an attaché to the Japanese Embassy in London, and was posted to Nanjing before returning to the Foreign Ministry.

He was bureau chief of the Central Liaison Office from March 1946. During this time, he attended meetings of the Allied Council for Japan as an "observer" and the sole diplomat. In August 1951, he was appointed the first head of the Japanese Government Overseas Agency in London. He was assisted in his work by the Japan Society of London, which had been set up two years prior.

In 1956, Asakai was appointed the first post-war Japanese ambassador to the Philippines.

In June 1957, he was appointed as the Japanese ambassador to the United States. He left the position in the winter of 1963, and was succeeded by Ryūji Takeuchi.

== Personal life ==
In 1936, he married Takako Debuchi the daughter of Katsuji Debuchi, a former ambassador to the United States. They had three sons and a daughter Akiko Asakai.

Diplomatic posts
New title	Japanese Ambassador to the Philippines; 1956–1957	Succeeded by Morio Yukawa
Preceded by Masayuki Tani	Japanese Ambassador to the United States; 1957–1963	Succeeded by Ryūji Takeuchi
