= Katsumi Ōno =

Japanese diplomat

Katsumi Ōno (大野 勝己, Ōno Katsumi, April 6, 1905 - Setagaya Ward, Tokyo, September 1, 2006) was a Japanese diplomat.

He entered the Japanese Ministry of Foreign Affairs in 1929. In 1953-1955 served as Ambassador to the Philippines, and as Vice Minister of Foreign Affairs in 1957–1958. He served as Ambassador to the United Kingdom in 1958–1964.

== See also ==
- List of Japanese ministers, envoys and ambassadors to Germany
