= Katsuji Debuchi =

Japanese diplomat

- 出淵 勝次
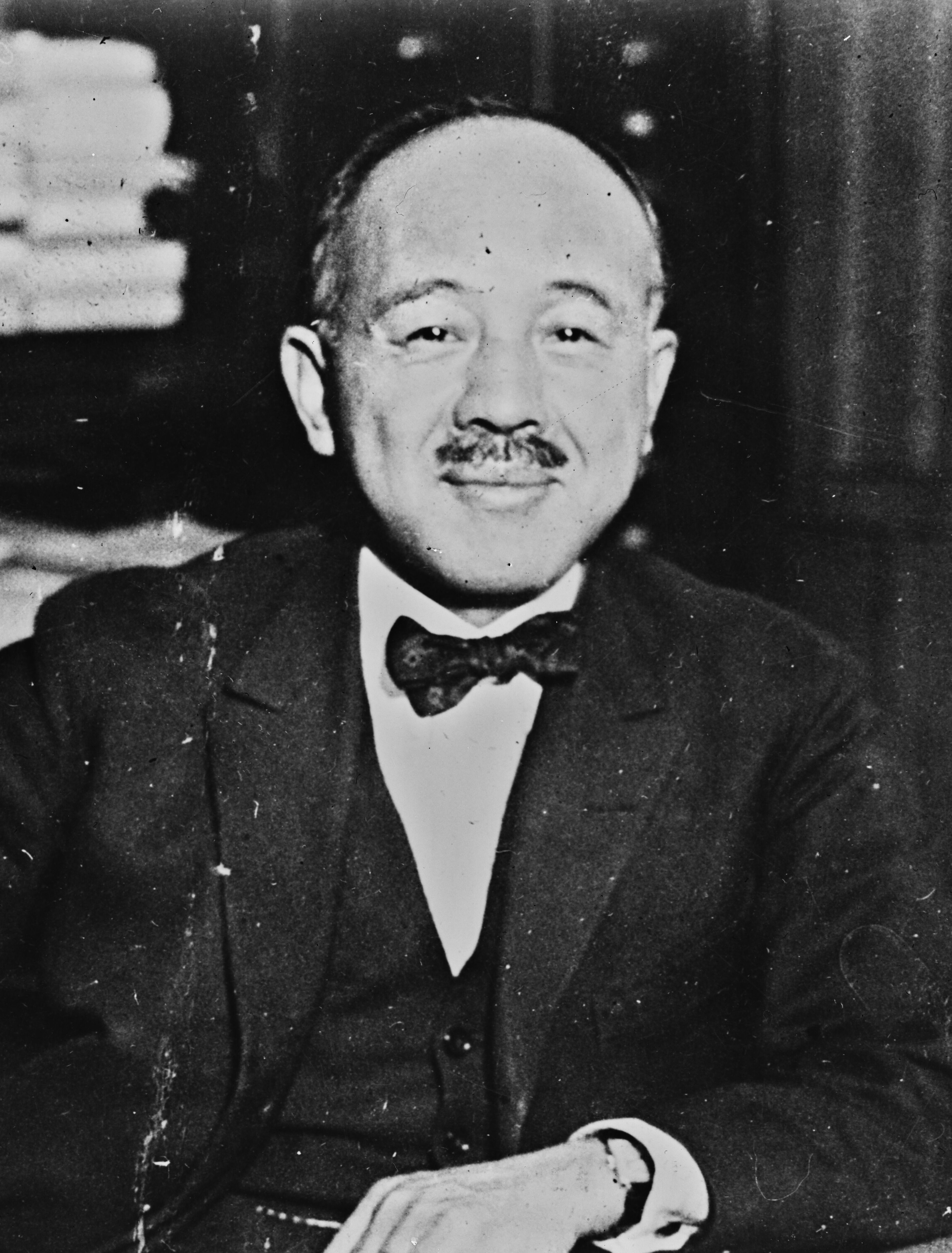
- Debuchi in 1928

Member of the House of Councillors
- In office 3 May 1947 – 19 August 1947
- Preceded by: District established
- Succeeded by: Matsusuke Kawamura
- Constituency: Iwate at-large

Member of the House of Peers
- In office 28 April 1936 – 2 May 1947
- Monarch: Hirohito

Personal details
- Born: 25 July 1878 Morioka, Japan
- Died: 19 August 1947 (aged 69) Morioka, Japan
- Party: Ryokufūkai (1947)
- Education: Tokyo University of Commerce

Katsuji Debuchi (出淵 勝次; July 25, 1878 – August 19, 1947) was a Japanese diplomat who served as ambassador to the United States.

== Diplomatic career ==
Debuchi served as a diplomat in China, where he was head of the Japanese Foreign Office division which dealt with Chinese affairs. He later served as vice minister of foreign affairs for Japan.

In 1928, Debuchi was appointed ambassador to the United States, succeeding Tsuneo Matsudaira. He was due to leave his position during 1931, but remained in the position following the Mukden Incident. As an ambassador, he was well liked in the United States.

In November 1933, Debuchi left his position as ambassador to the United States, apparently due to his failure to convince them not to oppose Japanese actions in Manchukuo (Manchuria). However, he remained part of the Japanese diplomatic mission afterwards, visiting Australia in 1935 as a goodwill ambassador as reciprocation for the Australian Eastern Mission of 1934.

== Personal life ==
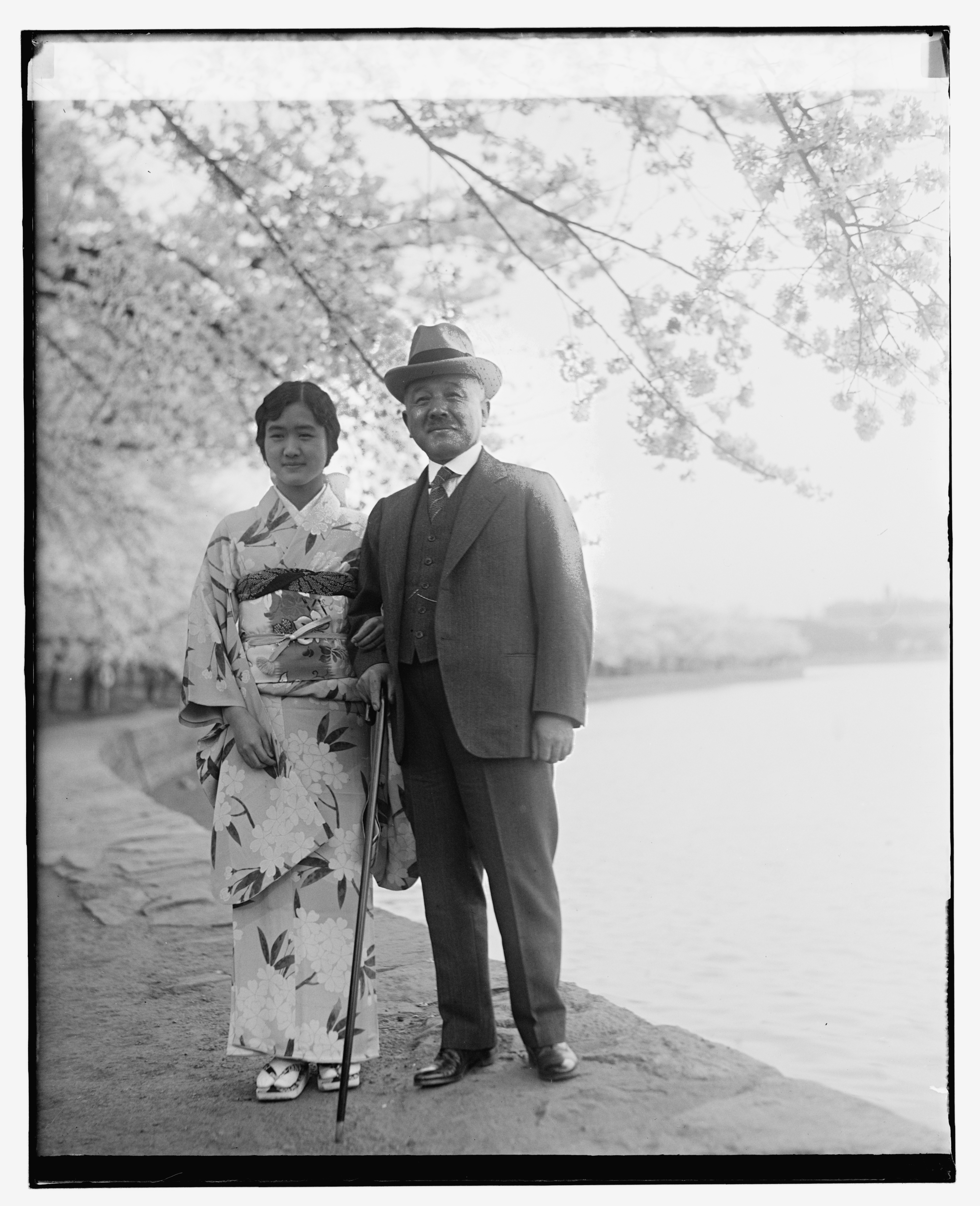
Katsuji Debuchi and his daughter Takako in 1929

He and his wife Hama Kikuchi had a son Masaru Debuchi and a daughter Takako Debuchi. His son studied at Princeton University. His daughter married Kōichirō Asakai, who served as ambassador to the United States.

He died on August 19, 1947, from intestinal cancer. He was a Catholic.

Diplomatic posts
Preceded by Tsuneo Matsudaira	Japanese Ambassador to the United States; 1929 – 1933	Succeeded by Hiroshi Saito
