= Kiyoshi Sumiya =

Japanese diplomat

Kiyoshi Sumiya (角谷清) (born 1925) was a Japanese diplomat who was Japan's ambassador to the Philippines from April 1985 to 1988, at the time of the snap elections that led to the end of the Marcos regime. He also served as Grand Master of the Ceremonies from 20 June 1989 until his retirement on 8 September 1995.

== Life ==
Sumiya was born in Tokyo in 1925. In March 1948 he graduated from the Tokyo Imperial University with a Bachelor of Arts degree in law. That April he joined the Ministry of Foreign Affairs and was Deputy Director-General of the American Bureau, Ministry of Foreign Affairs by 1952. In 1974 he was a Minister in the Japanese Embassy in Moscow and in 1976 he was Consul-General in Chicago. In 1980 he was Deputy Chief of Mission at the Embassy of Japan in Washington, D.C., where he met Jimmy Carter. In 1981 he became Japan's Ambassador to Hungary before returning to Japan in 1983 as Chief of Protocol, Ministry of Foreign Affairs. In April 1985 he became Japan's Ambassador to the Philippines. He was appointed Grand Master of the Ceremonies in 1989 and held that post until he retired in 1995. In that position he attended a dinner at the White House for the Emperor and Empress of Japan and presented President Ronald Reagan with the Grand Cordon of the Order of the Chrysanthemum.

Sumiya's wife, Masako Sumiya, was president of Pag-asa, founded October 1989, an organisation supporting the education of street children in Manila, which was awarded the Philippines-Japan Society's Medal of Merit on 29 February 2008.

== Awards ==
Many of the awards that Sumiya has received are listed in the Philippines-Japan Society's declaration when they awarded him their Medal of Merit, the society's highest award, in the year 2000.

- 1983, Second Order, Egypt
- 1983, Order of St. Olav, Commander with Star, Norway
- 1984, First Order, Qatar
- 1984, Order of the Southern Cross, Grand Official, Brazil
- 1987, Order of the Knights of Rizal, Knight Commander, Philippines
- 1988, Order of Sikatuna of the Philippines, Grand Cross (Datu)
- 1991, Order of the Defender of the Realm, Honorary Companion, Malaysia
- 1991, Order of Orange-Nassau, Netherlands
- 1991, The Most Noble Order of the Crown of Thailand, Knight Grand Cross (First Class)
- 1993, Order of Merit of the Federal Republic of Germany, Knight Commander's Cross
- 1993, Order of Merit of the Portuguese Royal House, Grand Cross
- 1994, Ordre National de la Légion d'honneur, rank of Commandeur, France
- 1994, Order of Isabella the Catholic second class, "Commander by Number", Spain
- 1998, Order of the Sacred Treasure 1st class, Grand Cordon, Japan
- 28 February 2000, the Philippines-Japan Society Medal of Merit

Diplomatic posts
Preceded by Yoshio Okawa	Ambassador of Japan to the Philippines; 1985–1988	Succeeded by Tsuneo Tanaka
Court offices
Preceded by Isao Abe	Grand Master of Ceremonies; 1989–1995	Succeeded by Makoto Watanabe
