= Erik Førner =

Norwegian diplomat (born 1963)

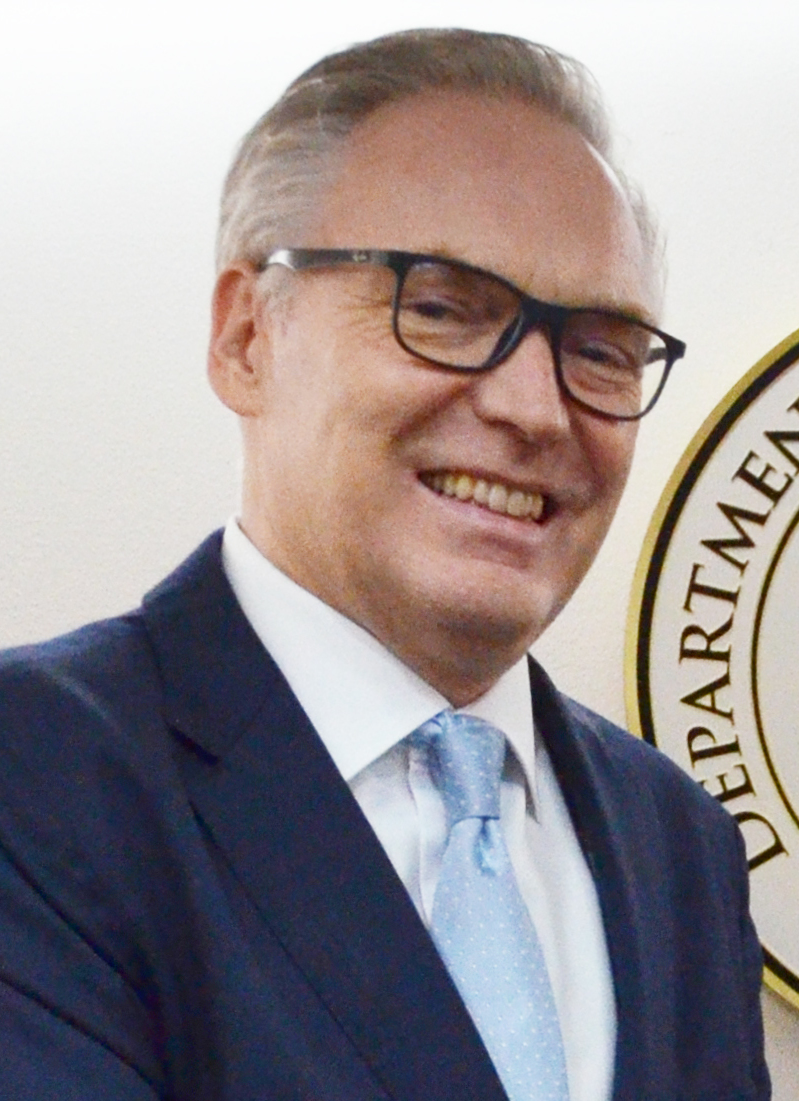
Førner in 2018

Erik Førner (born 24 September 1963, Bærum) is a Norwegian diplomat. He served as the Norwegian ambassador to the Philippines from 2014 to 2018 and to Switzerland from 2018 to 2022.

He was born in Oslo and is a cand.oecon. by education. He started working for the Norwegian Ministry of Foreign Affairs in 1991. He became subdirector in 2003 and head of department in 2004, before embarking on a counsellor position at the Norwegian embassy in Sweden from 2006 to 2011.

== Foreign honours ==
- Philippines:
  - Grand Cross (Datu) of the Order of Sikatuna (GrCS) (13 June 2018)
