= Argentina–Philippines relations =

- Argentina: Philippines

Diplomatic relations between the Argentine Republic and the Republic of the Philippines, have existed for decades. Argentina has an embassy in Manila and while the Philippines has an embassy in Buenos Aires. Both nations are members of the Association of Academies of the Spanish Language, Group of 77, the G20 developing nations, and Forum of East Asia-Latin America Cooperation and the United Nations.

== Country comparison ==
Official name	Philippines	Argentina
Native Name	Republika ng Pilipinas	Republica Argentina
Coat of Arms		
Flag		
National Motto	Maka-Diyos, Maka-Tao, Makakalikasan at Makabansa ("For God, People, Nature and Country")	En unión y libertad ("In Unity and Freedom")
National Anthem	Lupang Hinirang ("Chosen Land")	Himno Nacional Argentino ("Argentine National Anthem")
Population	100,981,437	44,938,712
Area	343,448 km^{2} (132,606 mi^{2})	2,780,400 km^{2} (1,073,500 mi^{2})
Population Density	202/km^{2} (520/sq mi)	14.4/km^{2} (37/sq mi)
Time zones	Philippine Standard Time (UTC+08:00)	Argentine Standard Time (UTC-03:00)
Capital	Manila	Buenos Aires
Established	12 June 1898 (Declaration); 4 July 1946 (Proclamation)	25 May 1810 (Declaration); 9 July 1816 (Proclamation)
Trade bloc	Association of Southeast Asian Nations	Southern Common Market
Government	Unitary presidential constitutional republic	Federal presidential constitutional republic
First Leader	Emilio Aguinaldo (official); Manuel L. Quezon (de jure)	Bernardino Rivadavia
Current Leader(s)	President: Bongbong Marcos (PFP)	President: Javier Milei (LLA)
Current Leader(s)	Vice President: Sara Duterte (HNP)	Vice President: Victoria Villarruel (LLA)
Legislature	Congress of the Philippines	National Congress of Argentina
Legislature	Senate; President: Vicente Sotto III (NPC)	Senate; President of the Senate: Victoria Villarruel (LLA); Provisional President of the Senate: Bartolomé Abdala (LLA)
Legislature	House of Representatives; Speaker: Faustino Dy III (PFP)	Chamber of Deputies; Chamber of Deputies President: Martín Menem (LLA)
Judiciary	Supreme Court; Chief Justice: Alexander Gesmundo	Supreme Court; President: Horacio Rosatti
Religion	Catholicism: 80.6%; Protestantism: 11.6%; Islam: 5.6%; Others: 2.1%	Catholicism: 62.9%; Protestantism: 15.3%; Others: 1.2%
Official Language	Filipino (Tagalog); English (Philippine English)	Spanish (Argentine Spanish)
GDP (nominal)	US$1,000 billion ($7,846 per capita)	$445.469 billion ($9,887 per capita)

== History ==
Both Argentina and the Philippines share a common history in the fact that both nations were once part of the Spanish Empire. During the Spanish colonial period, Argentina was then part of the Viceroyalty of the Río de la Plata and administered from Buenos Aires while the Philippines was governed from the Viceroyalty of New Spain in Mexico City.

Contacts between the Philippines and Latin America, including the Viceroyalty of Rio de la Plata (present-day Argentina), became increasingly fluid, buoyed by trade and migration. The Manila-Acapulco Galleon Trade was linked to another trade route that plied between Acapulco and Puerto Callao in Peru. From there, a land route via the Andes Mountains passed through Potosí in present-day Bolivia and then onward to Tucuman and Cordoba in present-day Argentina.

In 1778, the Spanish Empire opened the port of Buenos Aires to trade coming from the Indian Ocean. In March 1785, the Real Compañia de Filipinas was established that linked Manila to South America via the Indian Ocean and remained active until 1812. The company opened a trading house in Buenos Aires in 1789, and its warehouse was located in what is now known as Parque Lezama.

The first record of Filipinos in Argentina was during the census of August 1780, in which two “Indios de Manila” were identified, namely Andrés de la Cruz and Esteban Luis Mateo Sampzón, who were registered as craftsmen. Sampzon, who was born in 1756 in Malabon, became a master carver of religious art. His works are now considered among the best of Argentine religious art from the pre-independence period.

In the Argentinian side, a large number of Argentinian soldiers including Juan Fermín de San Martín, brother of Argentinian Revolutionary leader, José de San Martín, were immigrants to the Philippines. Another San Martin relative who arrived in Manila was Bernabe de Escalada, brother-in-law of the Argentine liberator. Escalada became the head accountant of the Royal Treasury in Manila.

During the Argentinian War of Independence, the Argentinian Admiral Hippolyte Bouchard recruited escaped Filipinos in San Blas (who escaped slavery in the Manila Galleons) in a war against the Spanish Empire. The frigate La Argentina reached the Philippines in 1818 and blockaded the port of Manila. During the blockade, the ship captured 16 Spanish boats. After a few months of marauding, the frigate left the Philippine archipelago and returned to Argentina.

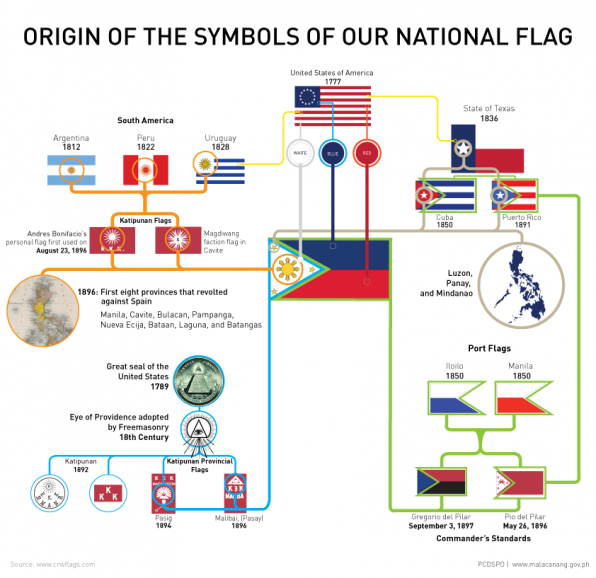
The elements making up the Philippine Flag and its subsequent meanings, the sun in the Philippine Flag comes from Argentina, Peru, and Uruguay.

Argentina's Sun of May symbol was also adopted as an emblem of the Philippine Revolution in the Republic of Biak-na-Bato and First Philippine Republic. Diplomatic relations between Argentina and the Philippines began on 27 August 1948. In April 1949, the Philippines opened a diplomatic legation in Buenos Aires. In May 1960, both nations diplomatic legations were elevated to the rank of embassy.

In July 1986, President Raúl Alfonsín became the first Argentine head of state to visit the Philippines. In October 1995, Argentine President Carlos Menem also paid a visit to the Philippines. In September 1999, Philippine President, Joseph Estrada, paid a state visit to Argentina, becoming the first Philippine head-of-state to visit the South American nation.

In September 2012, Argentine Foreign Minister, Hector Timerman, paid a visit to the Philippines and met with President Benigno Aquino III to discuss the broadening of the two countries’ relations and possible people and cultural engagements. In February 2014, both nations held the 2nd Bilateral Consultation Meeting in Manila where they agreed to further enhance bilateral trade relations.

In 2018, both nations celebrated 70 years of diplomatic relations.

== High-level visits ==
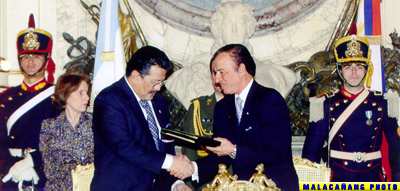
Argentine President Carlos Menem with Philippine President Joseph Estrada in Buenos Aires; 1999.

High-level visits from Argentina to the Philippines

- President Arturo Frondizi (1961)
- President Raúl Alfonsín (1986)
- Economy Minister Domingo Cavallo (1993)
- President Carlos Menem (1995)
- Foreign Minister Hector Timerman (2012)

High-level visits from the Philippines to Argentina

- President Joseph Estrada (1999)
- Foreign Secretary Albert del Rosario (2011)
- Foreign Secretary Enrique Manalo (2023)

== List of representatives ==
Date of diplomatic accreditation	Ambassador	Observations	Philippine President	Argentine President (credentials approved by)	Term end
September 8, 1960	Pedro Gil	Ambassador	Carlos P. Garcia	Arturo Frondizi	March 1962
1962	Luis Moreno Salcedo	Ambassador	Diosdado Macapagal	Arturo Umberto Illia	1964
Unknown	Tomas de Castro	Ambassador			Unknown
September 1976	Pelayo F. Llamas	Ambassador	Ferdinand Marcos	Jorge Rafael Videla	June 1981
February 1984	Trinidad Q. Alconcel	Ambassador	Ferdinand Marcos	Raúl Alfonsín	February 1986
September 1986	Sime Hidalgo	Ambassador	Corazon Aquino	Raúl Alfonsín	July 1992
April 1993	Carlos Alberto O. Villa Abrille	Ambassador	Fidel V. Ramos	Carlos Menem	2002
May 2002	George B. Reyes	Ambassador	Gloria Macapagal Arroyo	Eduardo Duhalde	2006
December 28, 2009	Rey A. Carandang	Ambassador	Gloria Macapagal Arroyo	Cristina Fernández de Kirchner	2014
2014	Ma. Amelita C. Aquino	Ambassador	Benigno Aquino III	Cristina Fernández de Kirchner	2017
August 2018	Linglingay F. Lacanlale	Ambassador	Rodrigo Duterte	Mauricio Macri	2022
December 2, 2022	Grace Tolentino Cruz-Fabella	Ambassador	Bongbong Marcos	Alberto Fernández	

== Bilateral Agreements ==
Both nations have signed several agreements such as an Agreement establishing Diplomatic Relations (1948); Agreement to elevate both nations diplomatic representations to the rank of embassy (1960); Treaty of Friendship and Cultural Relations (1965); Commercial Agreement (1988); Agreement on Sanitary Measures in Livestock, Fishery, and Aquatic Products (1994); Memorandum of Understanding to promote Trade in Agricultural matters (1995); Agreement on the Suppression of visas for Holders of Diplomatic and Official Passports (1999); Agreement on the Reciprocal Promotion and Protection of Investments (1999); Memorandum of Understanding on Cooperation in the Field of Sanitary and Phytosanitary Matters (2001); Protocol on the Establishment of a Bilateral Consultation Mechanism (2005); Memorandum of Understanding between the Foreign Service Institute of the Philippines and the Institute of Foreign Service of the Argentine Nation (2011); Agreement on Cultural Cooperation (2012); Memorandum of Understanding on Remunerated Activities for Dependent Relatives of Diplomatic, Consular, Administrative, and Technical Staff of their Diplomatic Missions and Consular Offices and of their Representatives before International Organizations (2012); Memorandum of Understanding between the Foreign Service Institute of the Republic of the Philippines and the National Foreign Service Institute of the Ministry of Foreign Affairs, International Trade and Worship of the Argentine Republic in the Field of Diplomatic Training (2021); and Memorandum of Understanding on Agricultural Cooperation between the Ministry of Agriculture, Livestock and Fishery of the Argentine Republic and the Department of Agriculture of the Republic of the Philippines (2022).

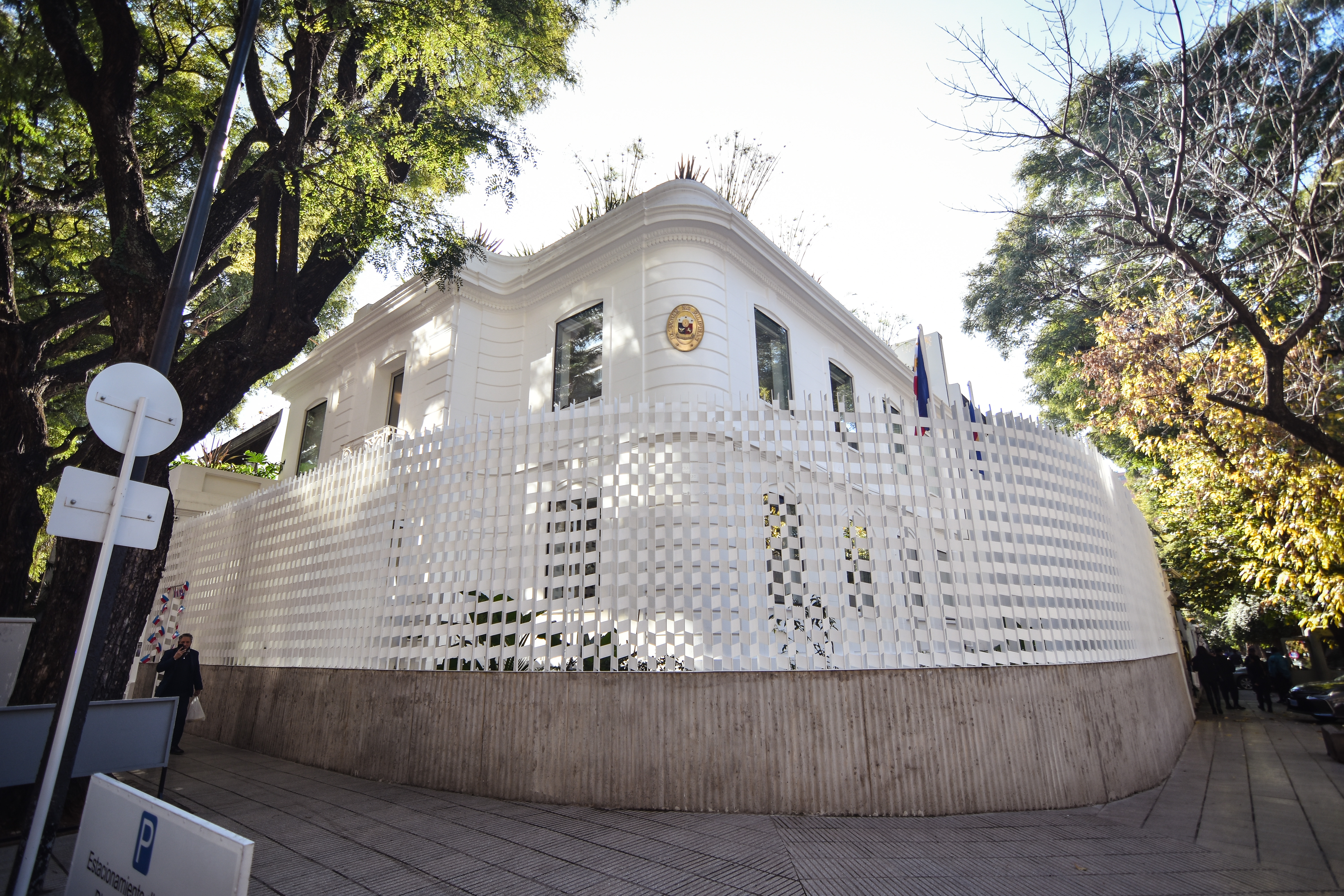
Embassy of the Philippines in Buenos Aires

== Resident diplomatic missions ==
- Argentina has an embassy in Manila.
- Philippines has an embassy in Buenos Aires.

== See also ==
- Foreign relations of Argentina
- Foreign relations of the Philippines
- Embassy of the Philippines, Buenos Aires
