= Edward Lee Kwong Foo =

Former Singaporean Ambassador

- Born: 20 March 1947; Singapore
- Alma mater: National University of Singapore
- Children: 4
- Awards: Bintang Jasa
- Position held: Singaporean Ambassador to Indonesia (1994–2006), Singaporean Ambassador to the Philippines (1990–1993)

Edward Lee Kwong Foo is a former ambassador and businessman from Singapore. He completed his study at the National University of Singapore (Bachelor of Arts in History) in 1970.

== Career ==
He started his career as a high commissioner to Brunei Darussalam (1984-1990). Following that, he served as Singapore's Ambassador to the Philippines from 1990 to 1993, and continued to be Singapore's Ambassador to Indonesia from 1994 to 2006. He supported Indonesia with humanitarian aid during the crisis in 1997/98.

He is on the board of two Singaporean public companies: Indofood Agri Resources and QAF as well the Indonesian food production company Dermaga Perkasa Pratama.

== Awards ==
- 1993: Order of Sikatuna, Grand Cross by the Government of the Philippines
- 2007: Bintang Jasa Utama (First Class Order of Service Award) from the Indonesian government for the improvement of bilateral relationship between Singapore and Indonesia.
