= Luis Moreno Salcedo =

Filipino diplomat (1918-1988)

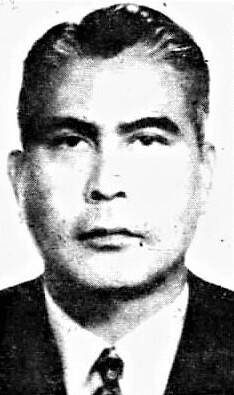
- Moreno Salcedo in 1957

Ambassador Extraordinary and Plenipotentiary of the Philippines to Argentina. Concurrently nonresident Ambassador to Chile
- In office 1962–1964
- President: Diosdado Macapagal
- Preceded by: Pedro Gil
- Succeeded by: Tomas G. de Castro

Ambassador Extraordinary and Plenipotentiary of the Philippines to Republic of Vietnam
- In office 1965–1968
- President: Ferdinand Marcos
- Preceded by: Modesto Farolan
- Succeeded by: Not available

Ambassador Extraordinary and Plenipotentiary of the Philippines to France and Permanent Representative to UNESCO. Concurrently non resident Ambassador to Romania (1972-75), Yugoslavia (1972-77) and Hungary (1975-77).
- In office 1969–1977
- President: Ferdinand Marcos
- Preceded by: Jose Medina Alejandrino
- Succeeded by: Felipe Hugo Mabilangan

Ambassador Extraordinary and Plenipotentiary of the Philippines to Union of Soviet Socialist Republics (USSR). Concurrently non-resident Ambassador to Finland.
- In office 1977–1982
- President: Ferdinand Marcos
- Preceded by: None (new Embassy)
- Succeeded by: Alejandro Melchor

Permanent Representative of the Philippines to the United Nations
- In office 1982–1985
- President: Ferdinand Marcos
- Preceded by: Alejandro D. Yangco
- Succeeded by: Salvador P. Lopez

Personal details
- Born: Luis Moreno Salcedo; 5 September 1918 Sara, Iloilo, Philippines
- Died: 5 March 1988 (aged 69) Manila, Philippines
- Spouse: Hermelinda Ycasiano
- Children: Ruy, Maria Luisa, Ramon, Esmeralda
- Education: University of Santo Tomas
- Profession: Diplomat, Lawyer

Luis Moreno y Salcedo (September 5, 1918 – March 5, 1988) was a Filipino diplomat. From 1946 to 1985, he made important contributions to the Philippines' diplomacy and foreign service. He served as Filipino ambassador to various countries in the Americas, Asia and Europe, including the Soviet Union. Salecedo also represented the country in United Nations and UNESCO. He implemented the opening of Philippine diplomatic relations with socialist countries in Central and Eastern Europe; he was the first Filipino diplomat accredited as nonresident Ambassador to three of these countries.

Moreno's book A Guide to Protocol (1949) was the main reference for Filipino diplomats seeking to build the Philippine foreign service in the period after World War II, and continues to guide the country's diplomatic practices.

== Personal life ==
Luis Moreno Salcedo was born on September 5, 1918, in Sara Iloilo to Timoteo Moreno y Brodeth and Trinidad Salcedo. He spent his childhood in Concepcion, Iloilo and moved to Manila at age 10. In 1940 he graduated with a Bachelors of Law (LLB) degree, magna cum laude at the Royal and Pontifical University of Santo Tomas, Manila. Shortly afterwards he served in the Philippine Army and then practiced law in a private law firm.

== Early career as a diplomat ==
Upon passing the Philippine Foreign Service entrance examination in 1946 he joined the then Office of Foreign Relations, which subsequently became the Department of Foreign Affairs. He became part of a group of new recruits sent to the US State Department for training shortly after independence in 1946 to improve the capacity of the Philippines to apply diplomatic principles and practices. Many members of this group were subsequently appointed to key positions in the Philippine Department of Foreign Affairs and their careers are the subject of a book, which describes Moreno Salcedo as the apotheosis of an outstanding graduate of this group. In the case of Moreno, upon his return to the Philippines he became Deputy Chief and then Chief of Protocol from 1948 to 1954. He then served in various positions outside the Philippines. He was Diplomatic Secretary of Legation and Consul of the Philippines, Mexico City, 1954–56, Diplomatic Secretary of Embassy and Consul of the Philippines, Washington DC 1956–57; Minister Counselor, Embassy of the Philippines to the Holy See, Rome, 1957–58; Counselor on Political and Cultural Affairs, Ministry of Foreign Affairs, Manila, 1958–59; and Minister-Counselor, Embassy of the Philippines, Buenos Aires, 1960–62. An important accomplishment during this period was the publication of his book on diplomatic protocol which was the key resource for Philippine diplomats and was also used as a reference by some diplomats in other countries. It is still in use to this day, for example as the guide for the presentation of credentials to the President of the Philippines.

== Career as Ambassador ==
Moreno Salcedo served as the second Philippine Ambassador to Argentina from 1962 to 1964, consolidating Philippine representation in that country. He was named Philippine Ambassador to South Vietnam from 1965 to 1968. This was a difficult setting for diplomacy, due to the Vietnam war, and Moreno Salcedo and his wife narrowly survived an attack on the Philippine Ambassador's residence in Saigon during the Tet Offensive of 1968. From 1968 to 1977 he served as Philippine Ambassador to France, and concurrently as Philippine Permanent Representative to UNESCO. In the late 1960s and early 1970s, while still posted in France, he also implemented the establishment of Philippine relations with Eastern European countries, having been named nonresident Philippine Ambassador to Romania and Yugoslavia in 1972 and to Hungary in 1975. In 1977 he became the first Philippine Ambassador to the Union of Soviet Socialist Republics in Moscow.

Moreno last assignment as a Filipino diplomat was as Philippine Permanent Representative to the United Nations in New York in 1982. He retired in 1985, after which he spent some time as Chairman of the Academic Council and Dean of the College of Foreign Service at Lyceum of the Philippines University.

== Honors and awards ==
Luis Moreno Salcedo received a number of awards. They are

(1) The Grand Cross of the Order of Sikatuna (Rank Datu, Philippines). This medal was conferred on February 26, 1987, under the administration of President Corazon Aquino. According to the Official Gazette of the Republic of the Philippines, the Order of Sikatuna is “an order of diplomatic merit conferred upon individuals who have rendered meritorious services to the Republic of the Philippines” and “one of the three senior honors of the Republic.”

(2) Knight’s Cross of the Order of the Knights of Malta.

(3) Placa de Gran Cruz de la Orden Civil de Alfonso X el Sabio (Spain). This award was given by the Spanish Government in 1975 when Moreno Salcedo was Philippine Ambassador to France and Philippine Representative to the United Nations Educational, Scientific and Cultural Organization (UNESCO). According to Wikipedia, the Gran Cruz is given only to Spanish or foreign persons who have made an extraordinary contribution to the development of education, science and culture, teaching or research, as long as the exceptional level of merit of this contribution is evident. Moreno Salcedo was cited specifically for his knowledge and studies in Spanish history, literature and culture as well as his efforts to promote more fruitful cooperation between the Philippines and Spain in UNESCO.

(4) Gran Cruz de la Orden del Libertador San Martin. Awarded by the Republic of Argentina exclusively to foreign civilian or military officials who in the exercise of their functions, merit a high level of honor and recognition by the Nation

(5) Grand Officer of the National Order of Vietnam. This was considered the highest honor that could be conferred upon an individual by the government of the Republic of (South) Vietnam, based on works, deeds, bravery, virtues or outstanding knowledge.

== Works ==
Luis Moreno Salcedo published two books, the first the standard reference for diplomatic protocol used by Filipino diplomats and the Philippine government for decades. They are:

Moreno Salcedo, Luis (1949, rev. 1959): A Guide to Protocol. Manila.

Moreno Salcedo, Luis (1959): Selected Readings on Philippine Foreign Policy. Manila

== References and endnotes ==
De Borja, Marciano R (2014): The State Department Boys: Philippine Diplomacy and Its American Heritage.

Foreign Service Institute (2014): History of Philippine Foreign Service Posts. Department of Foreign Affairs, Pasay, Philippines.

Moreno Salcedo, Luis (undated): Unpublished and incomplete curriculum vitae from archives of the direct descendants of Luis Moreno-Salcedo.
