= Embassy of the Philippines, Buenos Aires =

Diplomatic mission of the Philippines in Argentina

Embassy of the Philippines, Buenos Aires Pasuguan ng Pilipinas sa Buenos Aires Embajada de Filipinas en Buenos Aires

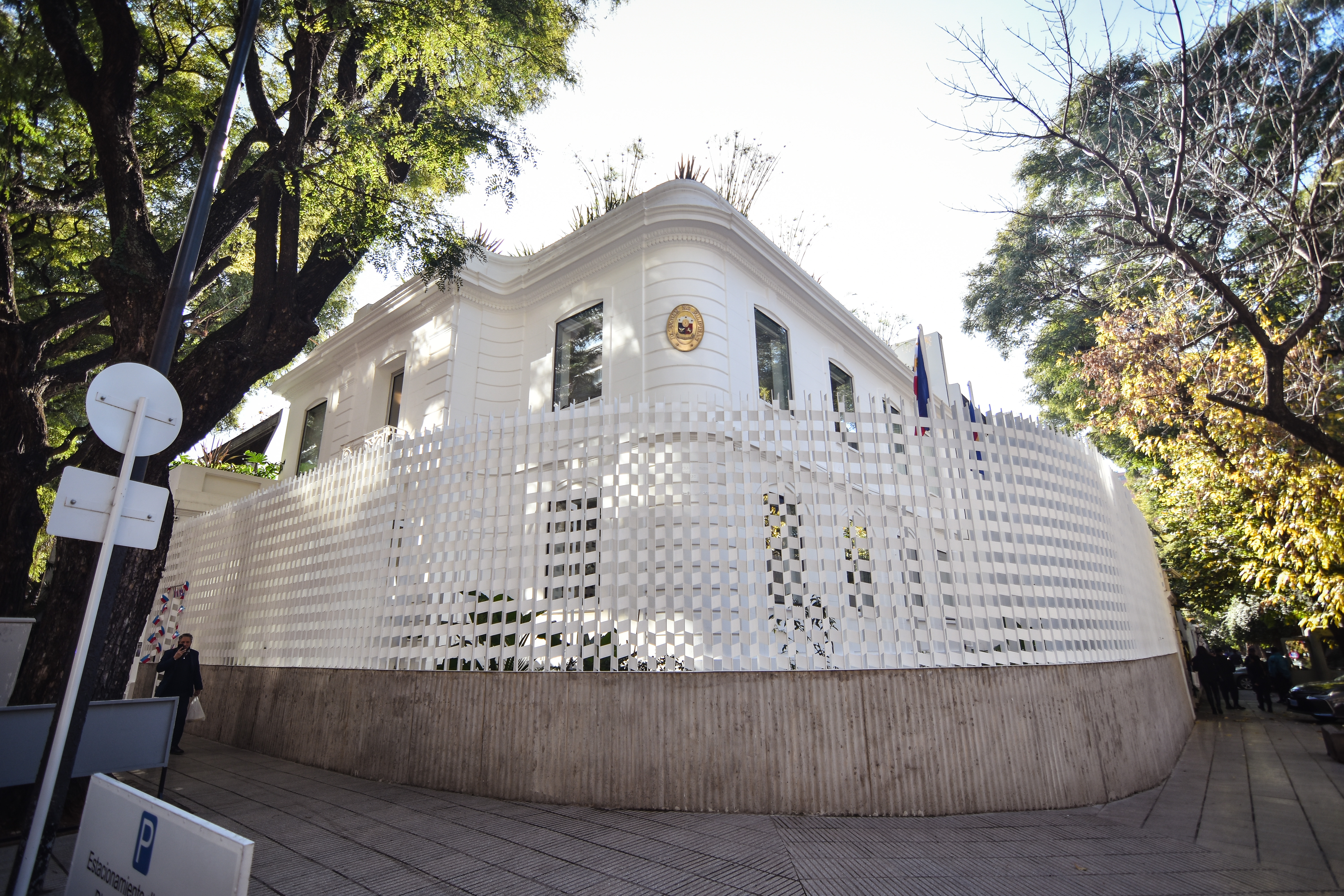
- Location: Buenos Aires
- Address: Calle 11 de Septiembre de 1888 1011, San Benito, Palermo
- Coordinates: 34°34′6.2″S 58°26′32.0″W
- Ambassador: Grace T. Cruz-Fabella
- Website: buenosairespe.dfa.gov.ph

The Embassy of the Philippines in Buenos Aires is the diplomatic mission of the Republic of the Philippines to the Argentine Republic. First opened in 1949 as the first Philippine diplomatic mission in Latin America, it is currently located in the barrio of Palermo in northern Buenos Aires, near its Chinatown.

== History ==
Diplomatic relations between Argentina and the Philippines were established on August 21, 1948, with Narciso Ramos, who would later become Secretary of Foreign Affairs, being appointed as minister to Argentina by President Elpidio Quirino, alongside former member of the Philippine Legislature Manuel Escudero, who was appointed as first secretary and consul general. A legation was then opened on April 4, 1949, the first Philippine mission in Latin America, initially operating from the Plaza Hotel Buenos Aires.

The mission was later upgraded to a full embassy in 1960, with former Representative Pedro Gil, who had been appointed by Quirino's successor, Ramon Magsaysay, as minister in 1956, becoming the first resident Philippine ambassador to Argentina.

In 2018, members of the Argentine Workers' Central Union (CTA) organized a protest outside the embassy against the "anti-worker" labor policies of President Rodrigo Duterte.

== Chancery ==
Although the Philippine Embassy in Buenos Aires has moved a number of times in its history, since 2012 its chancery has been located in two historically significant buildings.

=== Calle Zapiola, Belgrano (2012–2020) ===
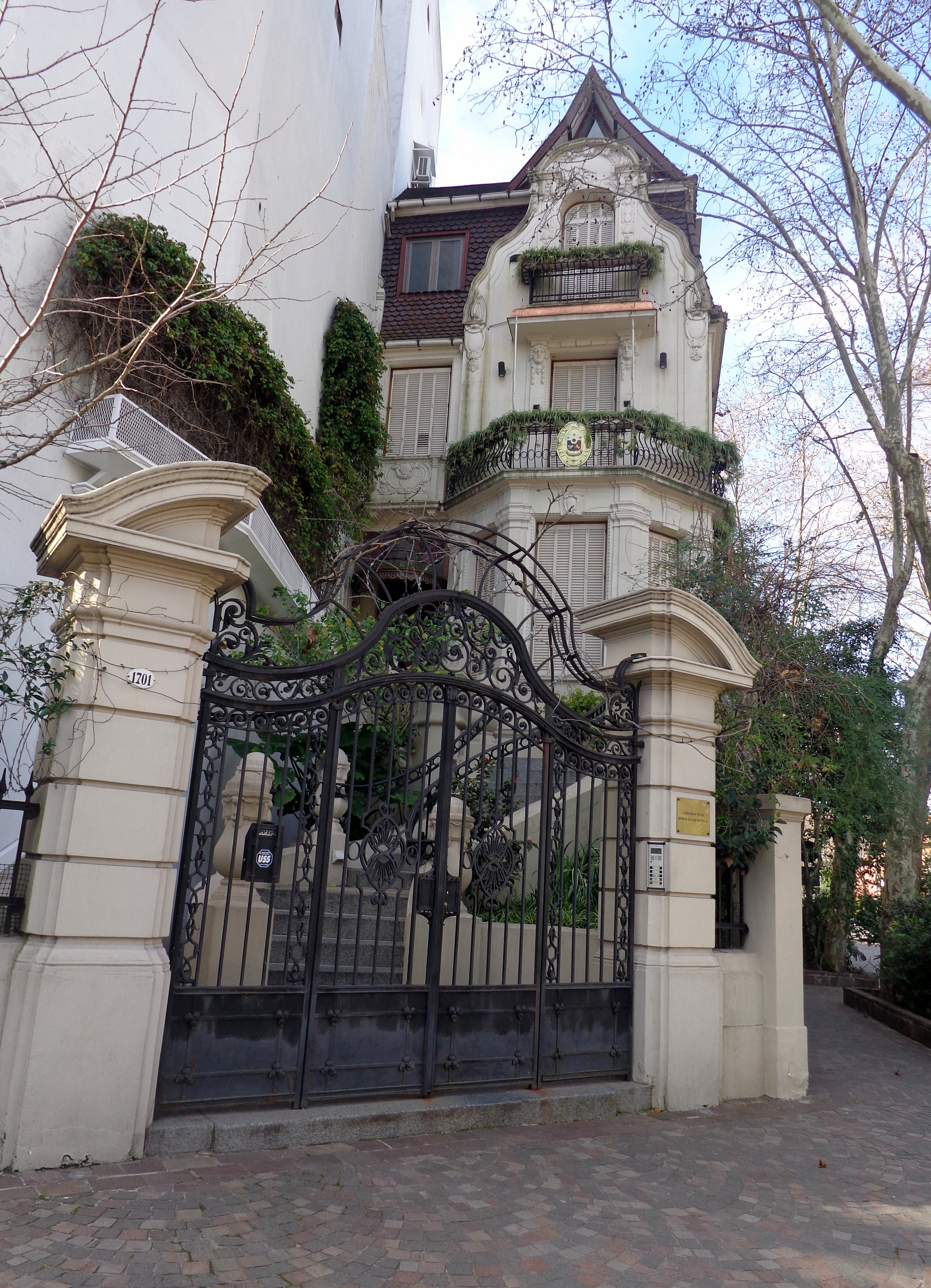
The former chancery on Calle Zapiola in Belgrano

Between 2012 and 2020, the chancery of the Philippine Embassy in Buenos Aires was located on Calle Zapiola 1701 in Belgrano, in a building designed by Swiss eclectic architect Lorenzo Siegerist and built in 1904. The property, a three-floor house, was equipped with features considered modern for its time, including central heating, a large terrace and a patio.

The property was used in various capacities prior to being occupied by the embassy. A room inside the property was listed for rent in a 1942 ad published in a local newspaper catering to the German community in Argentina, the Deutsche La Plata Zeitung, and on October 22, 1948, its owner, Francisco Toifl, sold the property — at the time a furnished house — to Raquel Burgos de Escobar. Escobar also acquired the property on the opposite corner, at the time home to a Viennese coffee house, and ran both properties as hotels. She then sold the property on November 6, 1950 to Josefa F. Mónaco de Miranda, who ran it as the Hotel Victory, and selling it less than a year later to a new owner, Teodoro Gehrung. By 1958, the property had come to the ownership of hoteliers Antonio Muras Núñez and Adolfo Mata Rial.

Starting as late as 1967, and until at least 1973, the property served as the residence of Dr. Carlos David Storni, who became president and later Honorary Member of the Argentine Geological Association. In 1989, it was converted into the Hogar del Virrey, a retirement home established by psychologist Alejandro van Oostveldt and his wife, Elsa Patricia Pizzi, and in 2007 the property was listed as a heritage building (edificio representativo) by the Buenos Aires City Legislature with the passage of Law No. 2.548, which prohibits the demolition of any structure in Buenos Aires built before December 31, 1941. The Buenos Aires center of the Sentro Rizal opened in the property on June 21, 2015, and the embassy fully vacated the property by December 30, 2020 in preparation for the new chancery, relocating to a temporary office on Calle Mariscal Antonio José de Sucre in central Belgrano.

In 1997, the Buenos Aires city government was forced to reconstruct the property's legal records after it was discovered that the original records could not be found.

=== Calle 11 de Septiembre de 1888, Palermo (since 2021) ===
On September 29, 2020, the embassy released bidding documents indicating that it had acquired a new building, located on Calle 11 de Septiembre de 1888 in neighboring Palermo, to serve as the mission's new chancery, which was funded through that year's Philippine national budget.

The land on which the chancery now stands was originally part of a vast estate owned by the family of José Pedro Ernesto Tornquist, a German-born property developer whose son, Ernesto, was one of the most prominent businessmen in Argentina during his time. The estate was later subdivided, and the corner lot was acquired by Tomás Finochietto and Ana Chammás, immigrants from Genoa who arrived in Argentina at the end of the 19th century. It would then pass on to their children, including Ricardo Finochietto, who would later become the family doctor of Argentine President Juan Domingo Perón and his wife, Eva.

The building was built in 1930 to serve as the Finochietto family home, the brainchild of Susana Edelmira Finochietto y Fernández, daughter of noted surgeon Enrique Finochietto, Ricardo's brother, and her husband Julián Tristán Arabehety. In 2009, it was catalogued and listed as part of the urban heritage of Buenos Aires, and the property was acquired by the Philippine government in 2019, during the ambassadorship of Linglingay F. Lacanlale. The embassy later budgeted around $1.31 million to renovate the property, as well as an additional $275,000 for new fixtures, furniture and equipment. Contracting the Buenos Aires-based firm Adamo-Faiden Architects to execute the project, renovation work was completed the following year.

Although the embassy relocated to the new chancery on August 2, 2021, it was not inaugurated until May 20, 2022, with the inauguration led by Foreign Affairs Undersecretary Ma. Theresa P. Lazaro. Lazaro was joined at the inauguration by her Argentine counterpart, Claudio Javier Rosencwaig, and Ambassador Lacanlale. The event also served as the diplomatic reception commemorating the 124th anniversary of Philippine independence.

Inauguration of the new chancery on May 20, 2022

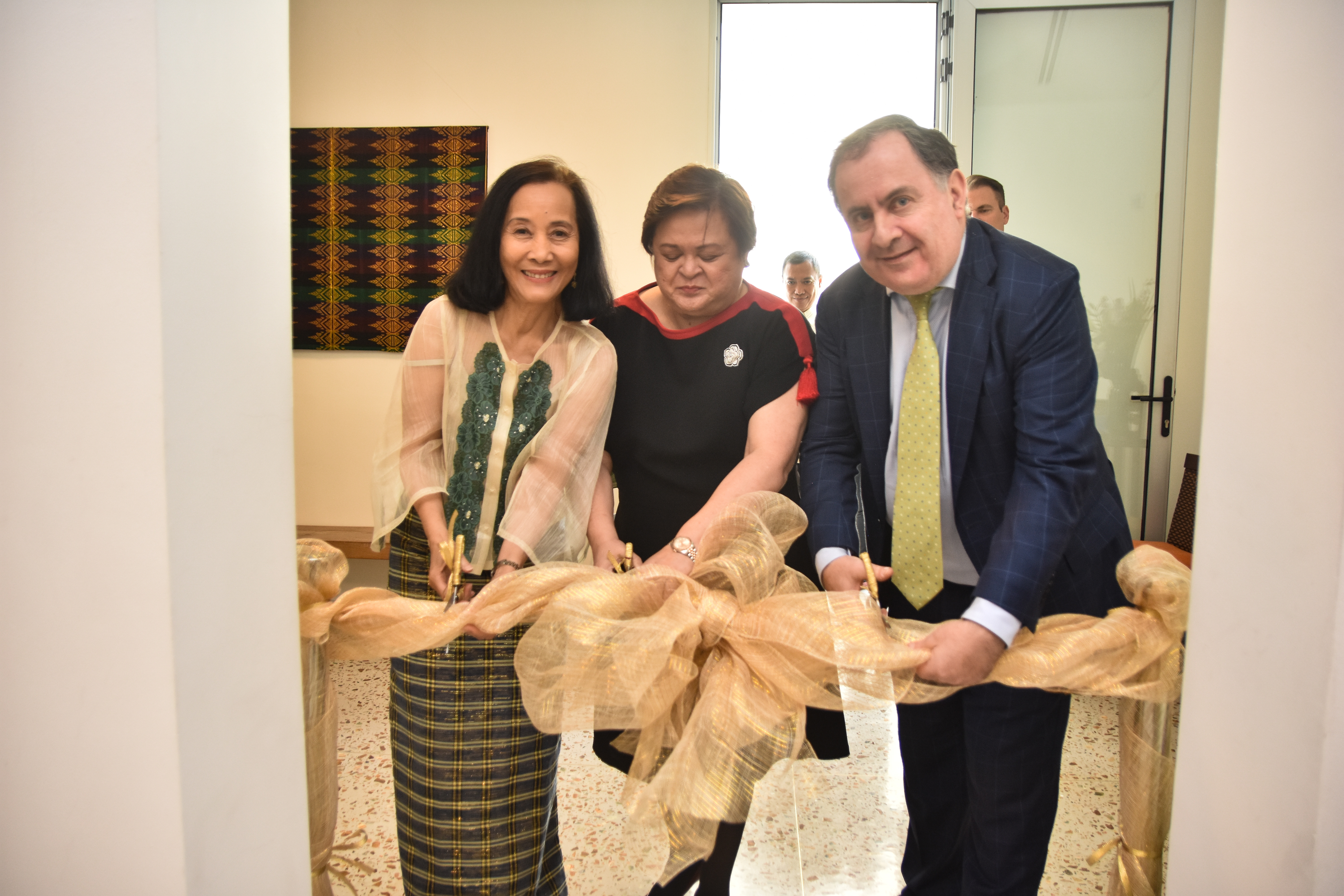
Lacanlale (left), Lazaro (center) and Rozencwaig (right) cut the ribbon to formally inaugurate the new chancery

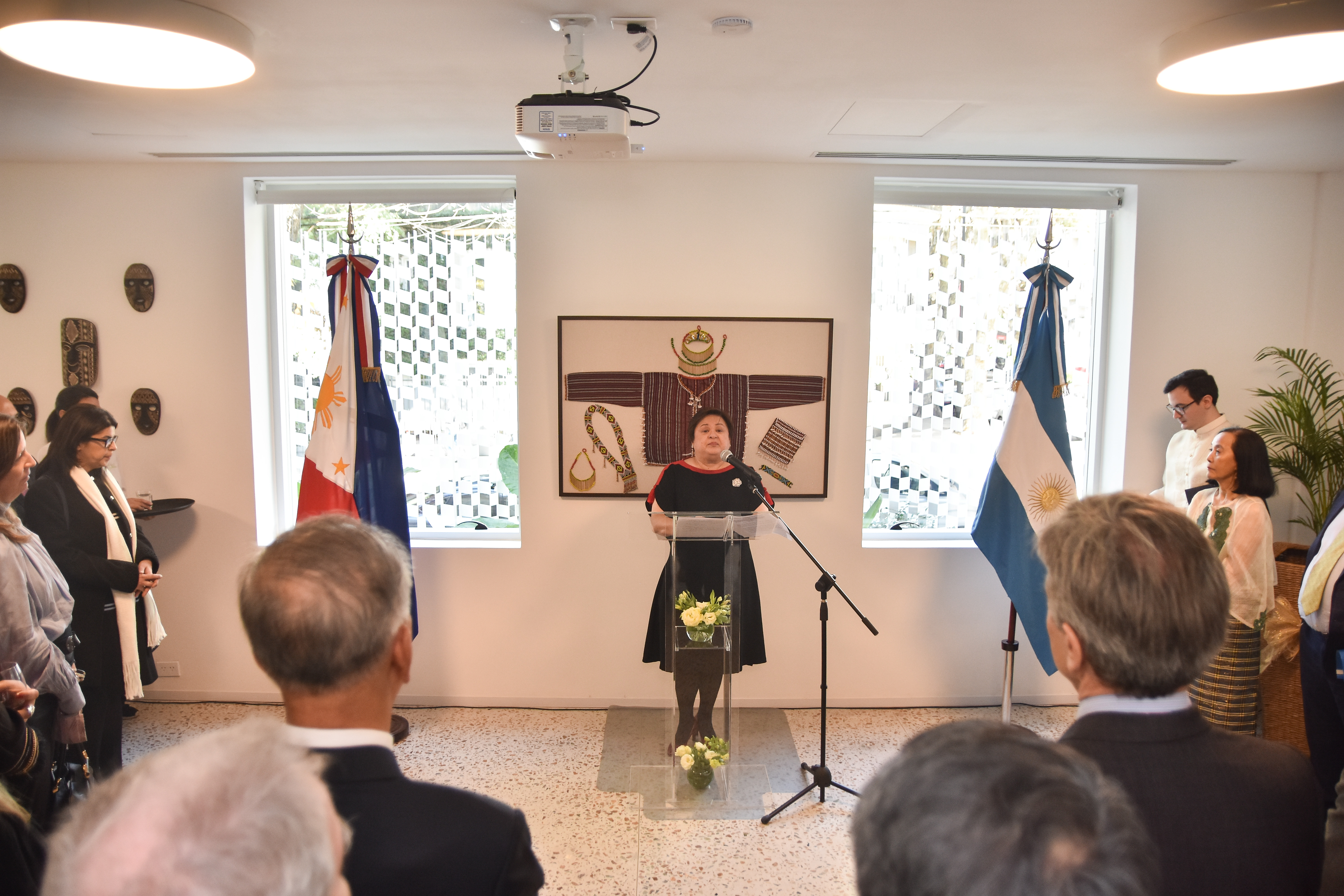
Lazaro, addressing guests, was the guest of honor at the chancery's inauguration

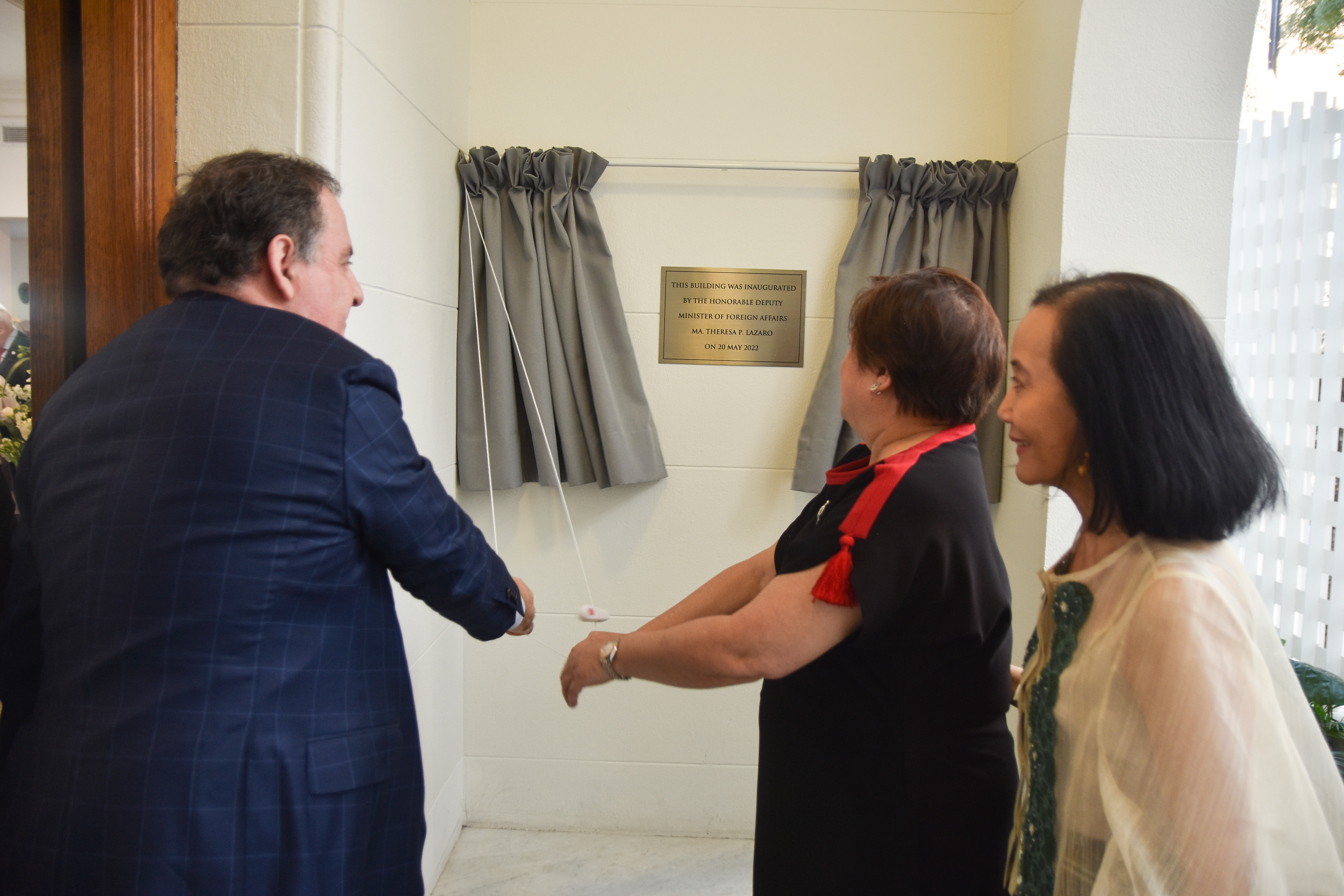
Unveiling of the commemorative marker for the inauguration of the new chancery

Originally constructed in the French Neoclassical style that was popular in Argentina at the end of the 19th century, the property was renovated to conform to the requirements of a modern chancery although many original features were kept, including the façade, the original wooden doors and grand staircase, and fixtures made of Carrara marble by the entrance and back stairs. The fence, meanwhile, is a new addition with a design inspired by ikat weaving patterns indigenous to the Philippines.

== Staff and activities ==
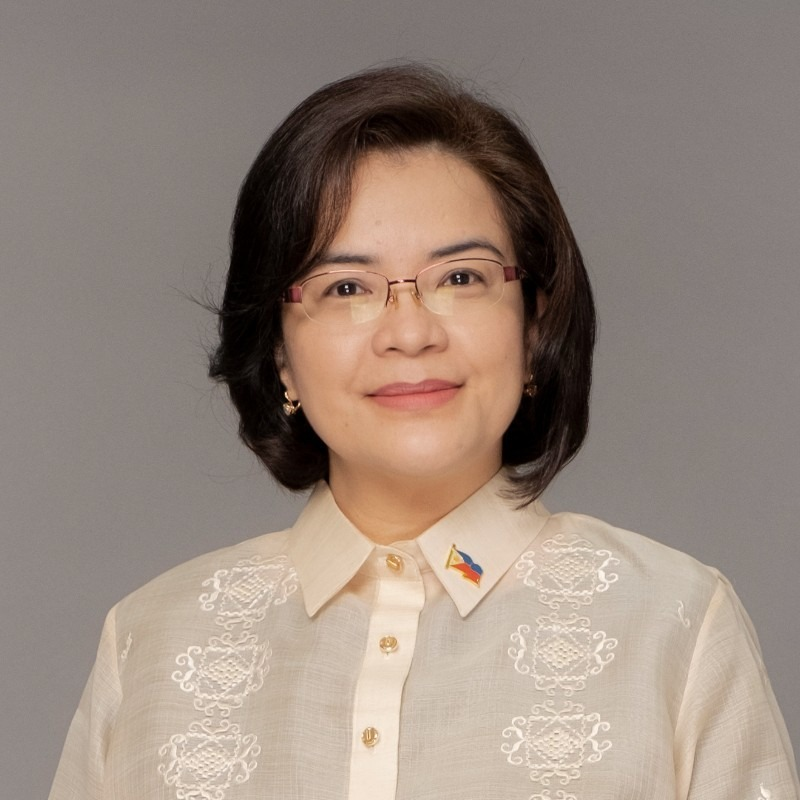
Cruz-Fabella in 2023

The Philippine Embassy in Buenos Aires is headed by Ambassador Grace T. Cruz-Fabella, who was appointed to the position by President Bongbong Marcos on September 1, 2022. Prior to her appointment as ambassador, Cruz-Fabella, a career diplomat, served as an assistant secretary at the Department of Foreign Affairs, and before that served as the Philippine representative to the Asia-Pacific Economic Cooperation (APEC) secretariat. Her appointment was confirmed by the Commission on Appointments on September 28, 2022, and she presented her credentials to Argentine President Alberto Fernández on August 1, 2023.

Many of the embassy's activities center around promoting Filipino culture and strengthening the deep cultural ties between the Philippines and the other countries under its jurisdiction. These include promoting the practice of arnis in the country in 2007, facilitating a series of concerts by the University of the Philippines Madrigal Singers in 2011, organizing a benefit dinner for victims of Typhoon Yolanda (Haiyan) in 2013, and hosting an exhibit on Philippine textiles at the Fondo Nacional de las Artes in 2019. It also collaborates with the other Southeast Asian missions in Argentina to promote the region as a whole: in 2015, the embassy led in organizing a festival promoting Southeast Asian cultures at Plaza Barrancas in Belgrano, and the next year participated in festivities celebrating the 63rd anniversary of the Federación Económica de Tucumán.

In addition to activities in Argentina, the embassy exercises jurisdiction in Bolivia, Paraguay and Uruguay, where it maintains honorary consulates.

== See also ==
- Argentina–Philippines relations
- List of diplomatic missions of the Philippines
