= Pasi Rutanen =

Finnish journalist and diplomat

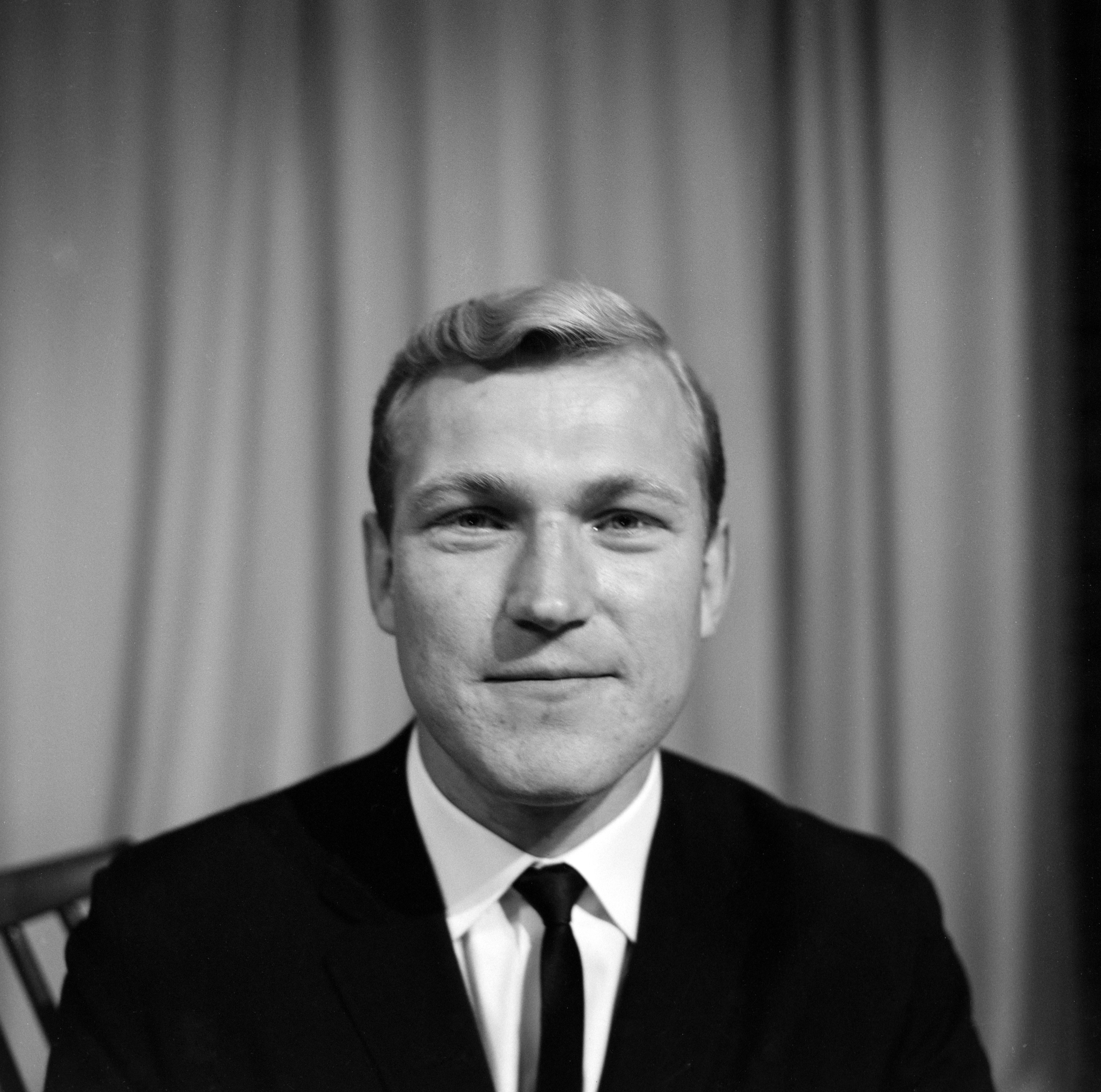
Pasi Rutanen in 1963

Pasi Juhani Rutanen (born 23 October 1936) is a Finnish journalist and diplomat.

Born in Jyväskylä, Rutanen studied at the University of Helsinki and did same time cartoons and columns at the Ylioppilaslehti. After graduating as a bachelor of political science he went to Finnish Broadcasting Company. In the mid-1960s, he was sent to the United States as the first Washington correspondent of the Finnish Broadcasting Company, until he moved to the diplomatic service in 1970.

Rutanen is especially remembered of the reports from Houston about of the Apollo 11 flight which landed on the moon.

Rutanen was an Ambassador from 1984 to 1987 in Manila and served as Deputy Director General of the Development Cooperation Department in the Ministry of Foreign Affairs between 1987 and 1989, as a negotiating officer from 1989 to 1991, Ambassador to Bangkok in years 1984–1986 Finland's ambassador to the OECD delegation in Paris 1991–1997 and Ambassador in Beijing 1997–2001

Rutanen lives with his American wife in Paris.
