= En unión y libertad =

National motto of Argentina

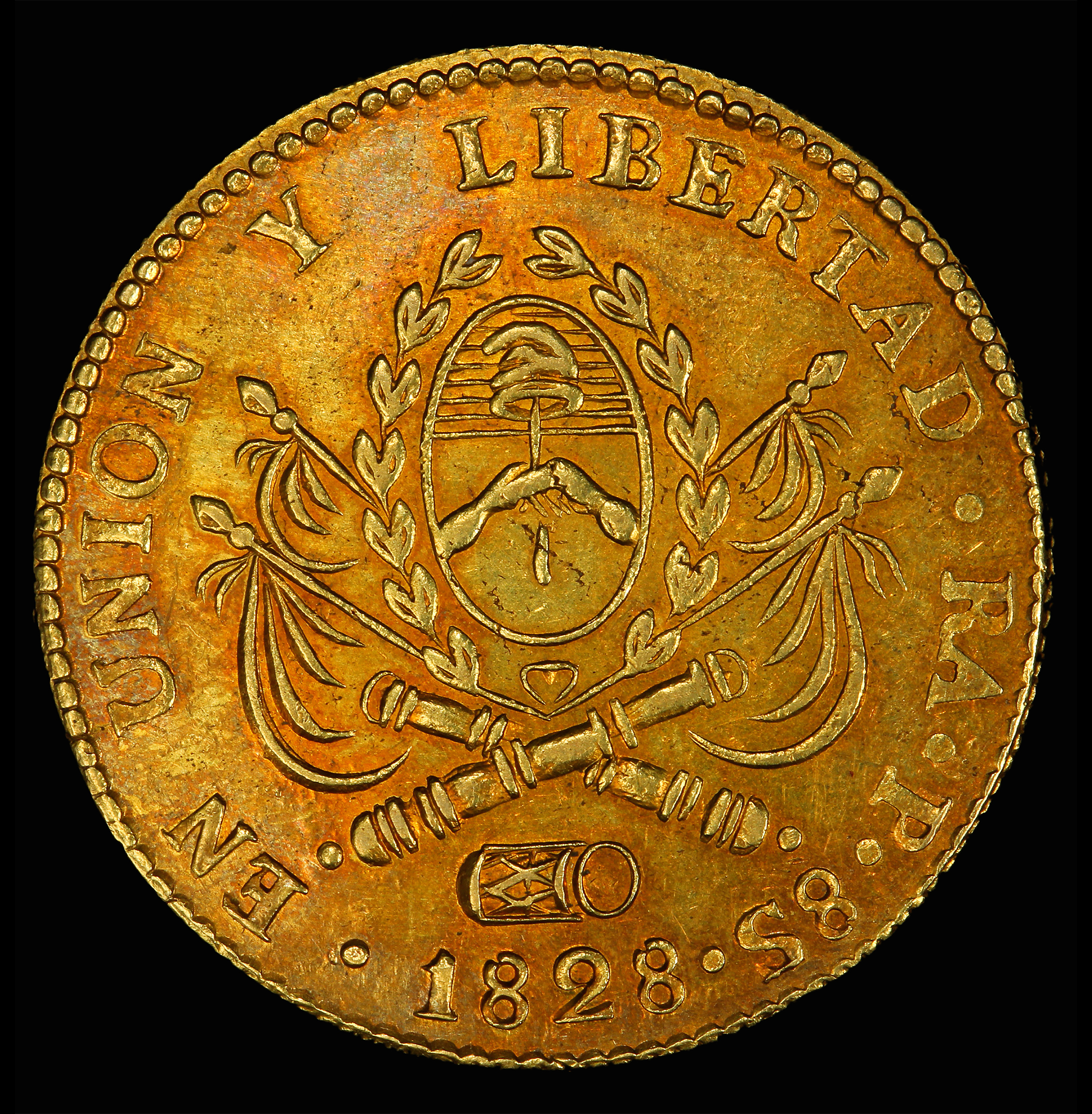
Coin from the United Provinces of the Río de la Plata issued in 1828, featuring the motto.

En unión y libertad (Spanish for "in unity and freedom" or "in unity and liberty") is Argentina's national motto. It appeared for the first time on the earliest Argentine gold and silver coins, as established by the 1813 General Assembly during the War of Independence of the United Provinces of the Río de la Plata from the Spanish Empire. The motto is considered to be a reference to the ideals of French Revolution.

It can be seen in all peso coins and banknotes currently in circulation.
