= Tsuneo Tanaka =

Japanese diplomat

Tsuneo Tanaka (田中常雄, Tanaka Tsuneo) (born February 2, 1930) is a Japanese diplomat. He was appointed as Japanese ambassador to the Philippines in 1988. After his retirement, he helped run the humanitarian organization, Global Voluntary Service, and received a Presidential Citation from Philippine President Gloria Macapagal Arroyo on February 15, 2010. In 2013 President Benigno S. Aquino III of Philippines awarded him with the Order of the Golden Heart with the Grand Cross rank in Malacanang's Palace for "his role in establishing numerous health, education and livelihood projects for Filipinos".

Diplomatic posts
Preceded by Ryukichi Imai	Ambassador of Japan to Mexico; 1990–1993	Succeeded by Mitsurō Donowaki
Preceded by Kiyoshi Sumiya	Ambassador of Japan to the Philippines; 1988–1990	Succeeded by Toshio Goto
