= Narciso Ramos =

Filipino journalist, lawyer, assemblyman and ambassador

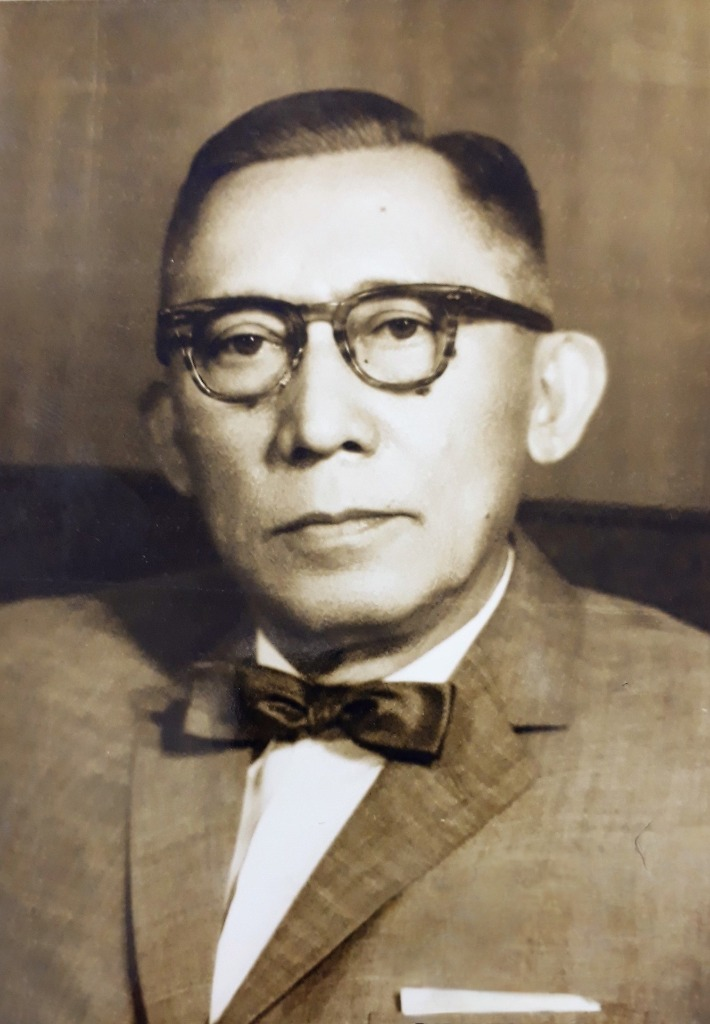

13th Secretary of Foreign Affairs
- In office December 30, 1965 – November 30, 1968
- President: Ferdinand Marcos
- Preceded by: Mauro Mendez
- Succeeded by: Carlos P. Romulo

Ambassador of the Philippines to China (ROC)
- In office 1956–1965
- President: Ramon Magsaysay; Carlos P. Garcia; Diosdado Macapagal

Ambassador of the Philippines to India
- In office 1952–1956
- President: Elpidio Quirino; Ramon Magsaysay

Minister to the Philippine Legation in Buenos Aires
- In office April 4, 1949 – 1952
- President: Elpidio Quirino
- Preceded by: Position established
- Succeeded by: Pedro Gil

Member of the Philippine National Assembly from Pangasinan's 5th District
- In office June 11, 1945 – July 15, 1946
- Preceded by: District recreated
- Succeeded by: Cipriano Allas

Member of the National Assembly from Pangasinan's 5th District
- Member of the Philippine House of Representatives (1934–1935)
- In office June 5, 1934 – December 30, 1941
- Preceded by: Juan Millán
- Succeeded by: Position abolished

Personal details
- Born: Narciso Rueca Ramos; November 11, 1900 Asingan, Pangasinan, Philippine Islands
- Died: February 3, 1986 (aged 85) Manila, Philippines
- Resting place: Manila Memorial Park, Parañaque, Philippines
- Party: Liberal (1946–1986)
- Other political affiliations: Nacionalista (1934–1946)
- Spouses: Angela Valdez (m. 1926; died 1978); Alfonsita Lucero
- Children: 3, including Fidel and Leticia
- Education: University of the Philippines Manila (no degree); National University (LL.B.)
- Occupation: Journalist; lawyer; assemblyman; ambassador
- Known for: Jun, N.R.

Narciso Rueca Ramos (Tagalog: [naɾˈsiso ˈɾamos]; November 11, 1900 – February 3, 1986) was a Filipino journalist, lawyer, assemblyman and ambassador. He was the father of former Philippine President Fidel V. Ramos and Philippine Senator Leticia Ramos-Shahani.

== Early life and education ==
Born to Plácido Ramos (né Apelido) y Tabadero and Ramona Rueca y Bugayong in Asingan, Pangasinan on November 11, 1900, Narciso R. Ramos was a journalist, lawyer, assemblyman and ambassador. He was baptized thirteen days later in the same municipality.

He attended the Asingan Elementary School and the Manila High School, and graduated from the latter in 1919. After pursuing journalism at the College of Liberal Arts of the University of the Philippines from 1920 to 1922, he studied law at National University, where he obtained a Bachelor of Laws degree in 1924. In the same year, he took and passed the bar examinations.

== Career ==
As a member of the official Philippine delegation, he participated in the International Conference of Students that convened in Peking, China in April 1922. From 1924 to 1934, before joining national politics, Ramos practiced law in his home province and in Manila. He was recognized as a pioneer in the field of law in Pangasinan. Despite the prestige and status he had gained as a lawyer, he still considered it his duty to defend the poor and the oppressed.

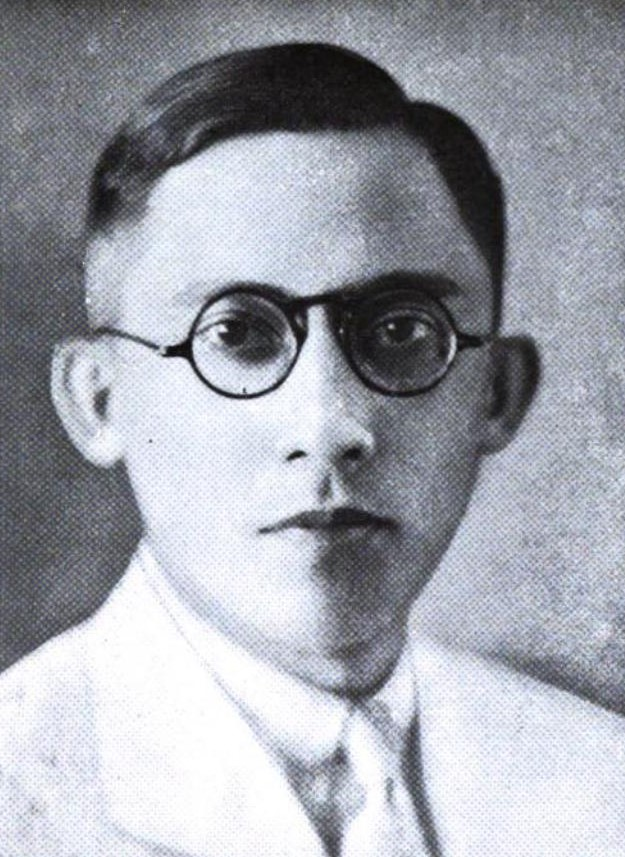
Photograph from The Commercial & Industrial Manual of the Philippines, 1941

In 1934, he was elected representative of Pangasinan's 5th District to the 10th Philippine Legislature. In 1941, due undoubtedly to his brilliant performance as a legislator and unstinting service to his constituents, he was reelected as a congressman. During the dark days of the Japanese occupation, he opted to risk his life by joining the Filipino resistance fighters, rather than collaborate with the enemy.

In 1946, the year the Philippines regained its independence, Ramos, by then already an eminent national figure, was called upon by President Roxas along with Ambassador Joaquin Elizalde to establish the country's foreign service and organize the first Philippine embassy in Washington, D.C. Thus began his long and distinguished career in Foreign Service.

Ramos prepared the first batch of Filipino consuls in America. While performing his duties as Philippine minister counselor in Washington, he also assisted in forming the basic framework of the country's Foreign Service rules. Among his pioneering achievements was the sending of several Philippine delegations to socialist and Latin American countries.

Ramos served as Minister to the Philippine Legation in Buenos Aires from 1949 to 1952. From 1952 to 1956, during the early days of the Non-Aligned Movement, he was the Philippine envoy to India, having established the first Philippine mission in New Delhi. Later, in 1956, through his initiative as chief of mission, another embassy was set up in Taipei, where he served until 1965. In 1965, he was appointed foreign affairs secretary by President Ferdinand Marcos. He served in that capacity until 1968. During this period, he achieved several milestones in his career and in the Philippines' international relations.

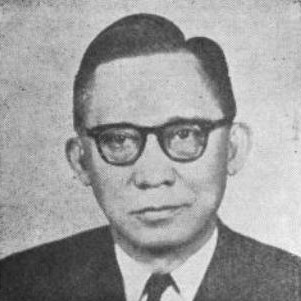
Ramos in 1967

On August 8, 1967, he joined other Southeast Asian leaders in Bangkok in founding the ASEAN (Association of Southeast Asian Nations), and in signing the ASEAN Declaration. Through the formation of ties with socialist countries, he affirmed his beliefs in a neutral foreign policy, notwithstanding his anti-Communist principles. The bonds he formed then have stayed firm despite the vicissitudes wrought by time on the fragile world of international relations.

Also, on September 16, 1966, he endeavored to remold Philippine friendship with the United States by signing the Ramos-Rusk Agreement, which decreased the tenure of the RP-US military bases agreement of 1947, originally 99 years, to only 25 more years and allowed the crucial changes in the Military Bases Accord on January 7, 1979. Thus, the leases expired in 1991, ahead of the original 2046 date. He was also instrumental in reestablishing the Asia Pacific Council, or ASPAC.

Ramos left government service on December 31, 1968. During his retirement, however, he carried on tirelessly with his various civic, social and economic projects. In 1982, he was asked once more to serve in the government, as director of the Asian Exchange Center in Taipei, Taiwan (semi-official Ambassador to Taiwan). He was already 82 then, but he stayed on the job for three years. He was a public servant who have served under eight Philippine presidents from Manuel L. Quezon to Ferdinand E. Marcos. A true patriot, too, he believed that nationalism and modernization, through which the country could gain true independence and self-reliance, were the key to national progress. Ramos received the Legion of Honor, rank of Commander. for his services as a guerrilla in the Second World War. Later, in recognition of his achievements in the Foreign Service, he was given the Order of Sikatuna Award (rank of datu).

== Personal life ==
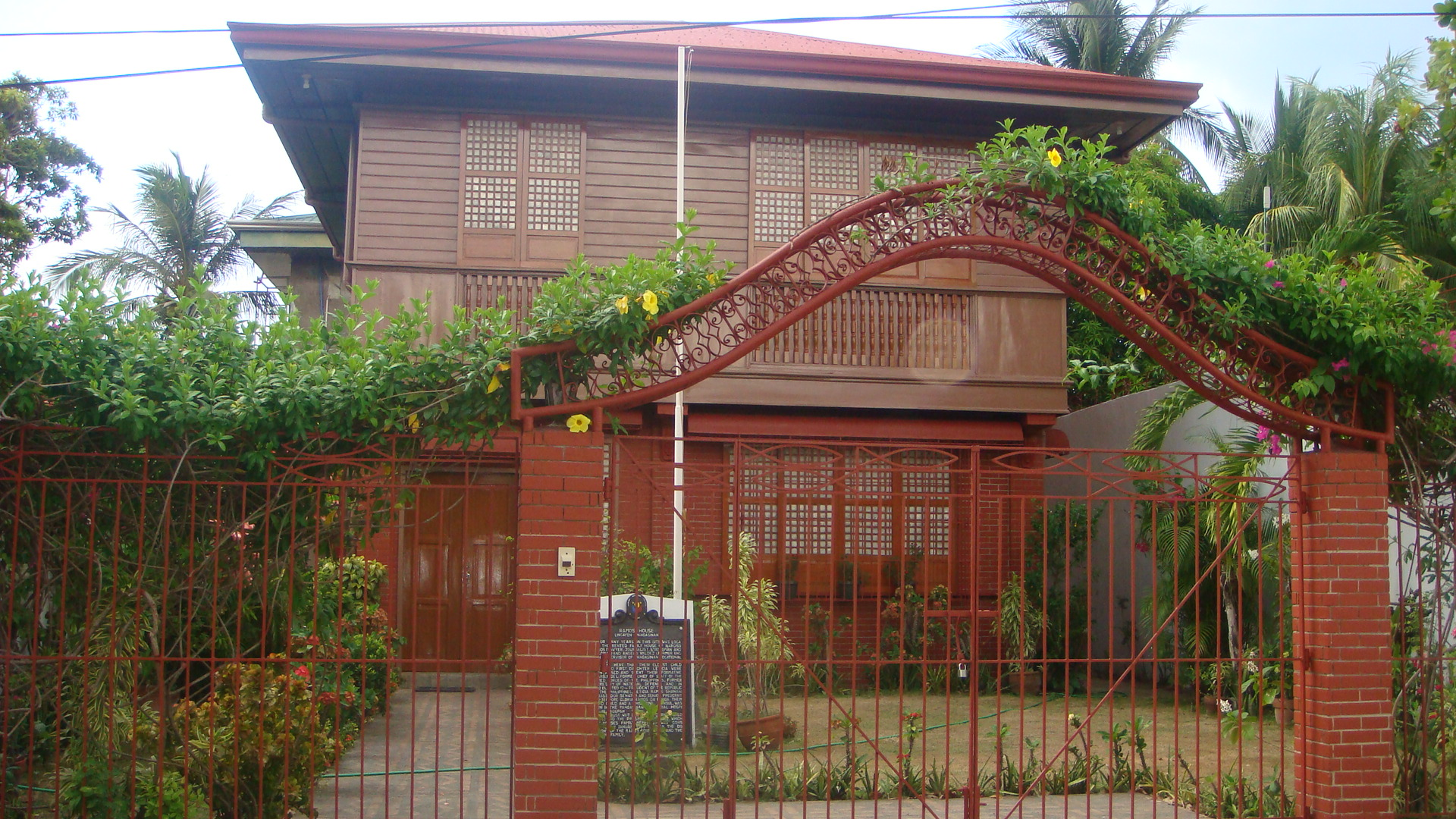
The reconstructed family house of Narciso Ramos & Angela Valdez, 1995 Ramos House, located along Primicias Street in Poblacion, Lingayen, Pangasinan

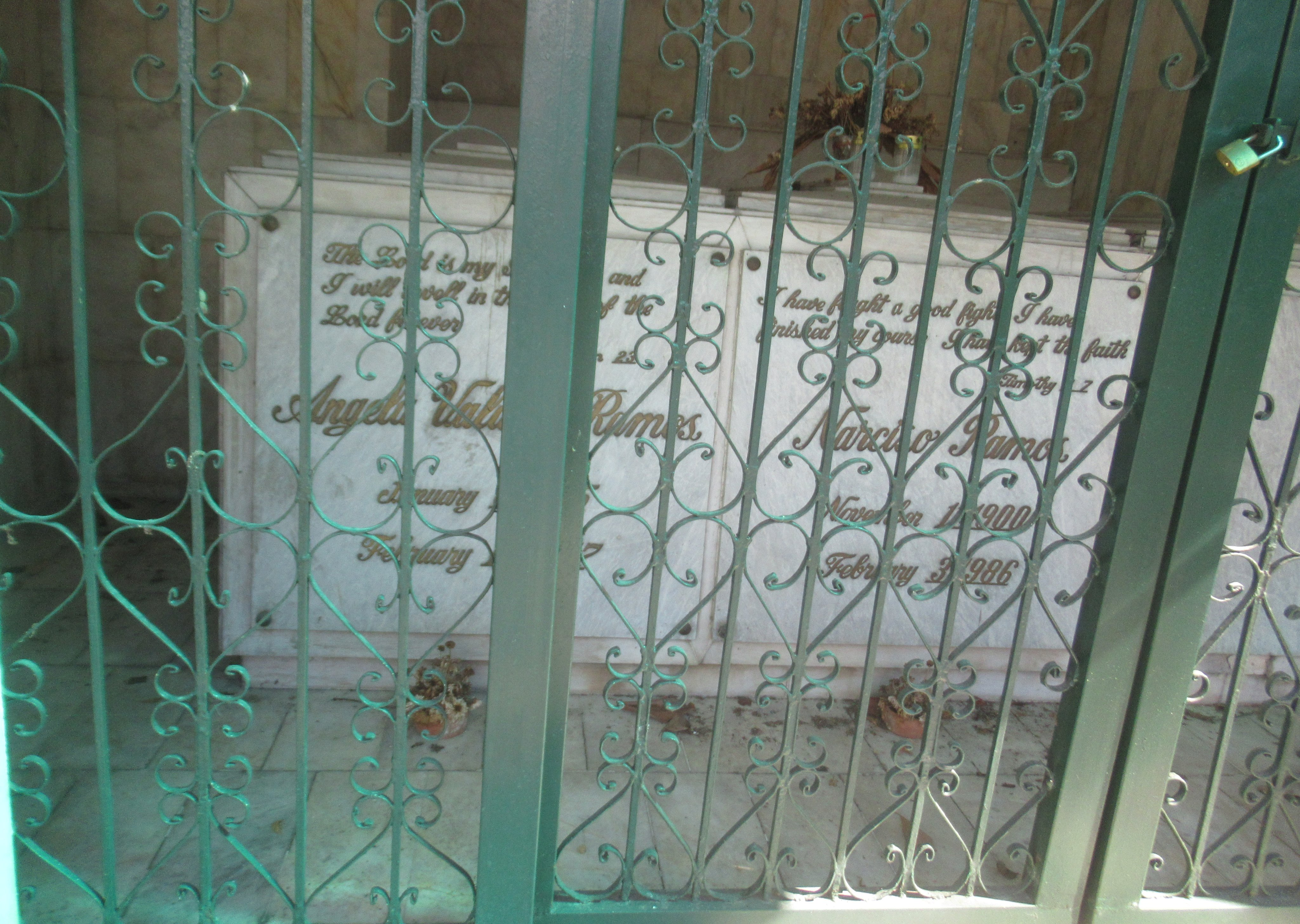
Angela Valdez & Ramos' graves at Manila Memorial Park – Sucat.

=== Family ===
By his first wife, Angela Valdez (first cousin of Mariano Marcos), he had three children:

- Fidel V. Ramos (1928–2022), 12th Philippine President, 1992–1998
- Leticia Ramos-Shahani (1929–2017), two-term Senator, 1987–1998
- Gloria Ramos-da Rodda (1935–2019), a consul in the U.S.

After Angela died in 1978, Ramos married Alfonsita Lucero.

== Death ==
Ramos died on February 3, 1986 due to a stroke. He died just few days before Philippines People Power Revolution.

== Honours ==
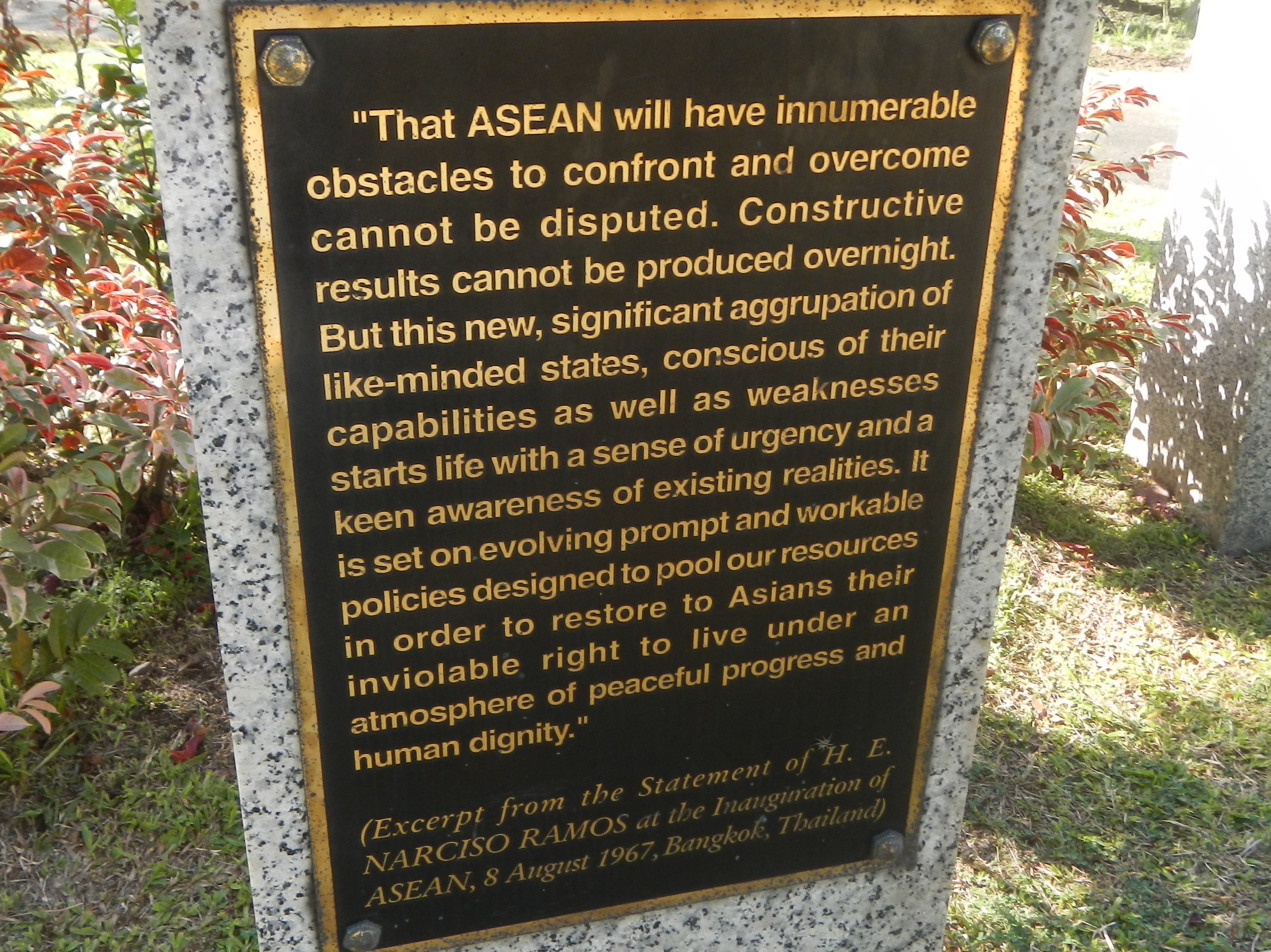
Bust of Narciso Ramos at the ASEAN Garden with the excerpt from his statement at the inauguration of ASEAN.

=== National ===
- Philippines:
  - Grand Cross of the Order of Sikatuna, Rank of Datu (GCrS)
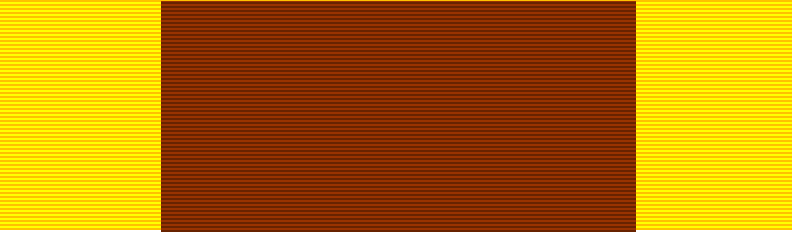
  - Knight Grand Cross of the Order of the Knights of Rizal (KGCR)

=== Foreign ===
- France:
  - Commander of the National Order of the Legion of Honour
- Indonesia:
  - Second Class of the Star of the Republic of Indonesia - 1979
- Spain:
  - Knight Grand Cross of the Order of Isabella the Catholic - 1968

== Legacy ==
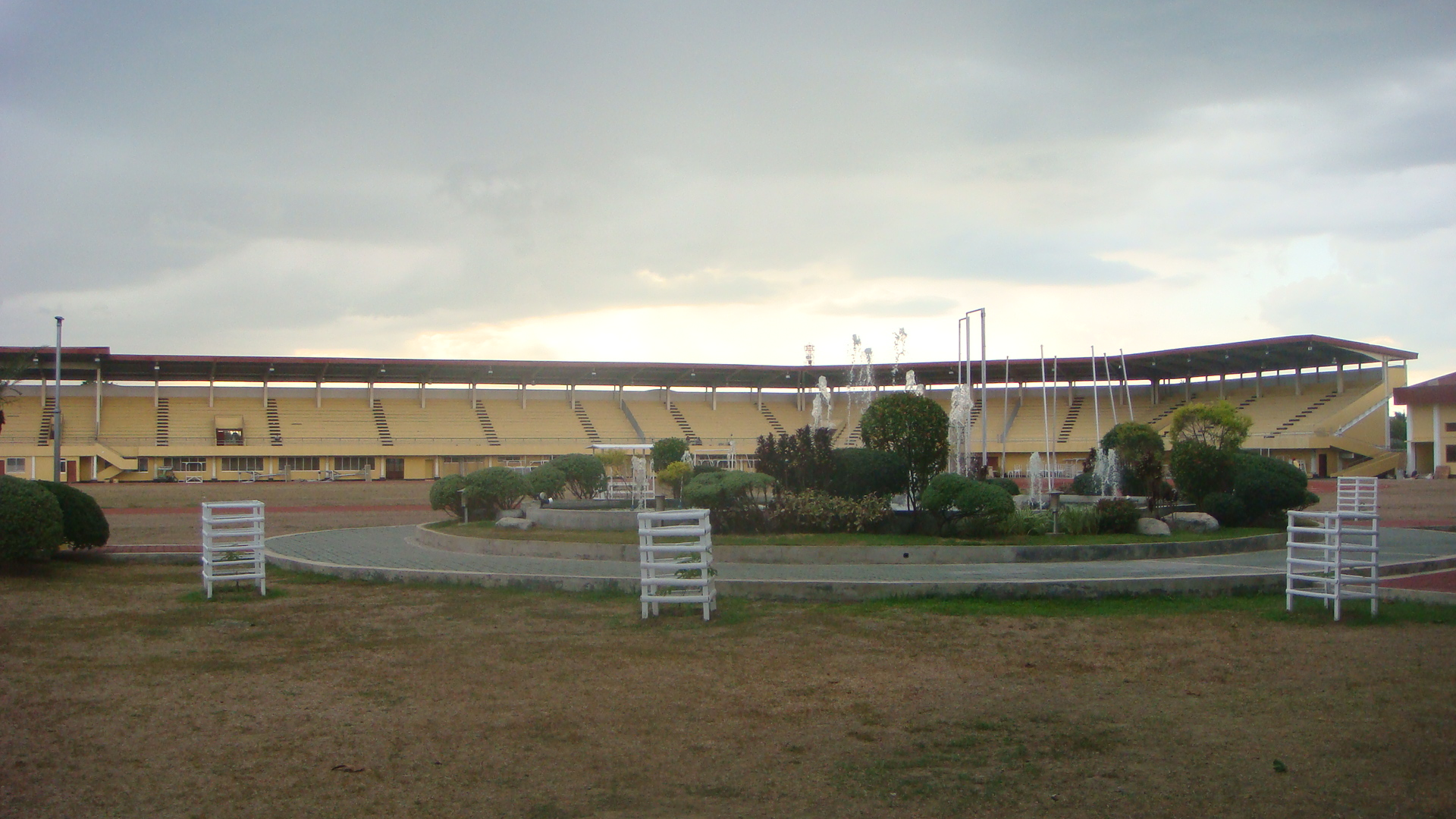
Narciso Ramos Sports Complex and Civic Center (Lingayen, Pangasinan)

These buildings are named after him:

- Narciso Ramos Sports Complex (Lingayen, Pangasinan)
- Narciso Ramos Sports & Civic Center (Lingayen, Pangasinan)
- Narciso Ramos Gym (Lingayen, Pangasinan)
- Narciso R. Ramos Elementary School (Asingan, Pangasinan)
- Narciso Ramos Highway (Kauswagan, Lanao del Norte)
