= Morio Yukawa =

Japanese economist and diplomat (1908–1988)

Morio Yukawa (湯川 盛夫, Yukawa Morio; February 23, 1908 – March 16, 1988) was a Japanese economist and diplomat.

Yukawa served in the Japanese Ministry of Foreign Affairs during World War II and took part in the Japanese official delegation that met US General Douglas MacArthur in Manila on August 19, 1945, in order to make arrangements for the Japanese surrender. During the 1950s, he served as head of Economic Affairs Bureau in the Japanese Ministry of Foreign Affairs, and in that capacity tried to negotiate his country's accession to GATT. He represented Japan at the UNESCO General Session in 1953. Later, he served as Ambassador to the Philippines, and in that capacity concluded the Treaty of Amity of December 9, 1960. Afterwards he served as Head of Mission to the EEC in 1964–1968 and Ambassador to the United Kingdom in 1968-1972. In 1972–1979, Yukawa served as Grand Master of Ceremonies of the Imperial Household Agency.

== Works (partial list) ==
- "Catholicism in Japan". Philippine Studies. 6 (4). 1958.
