= Pedro Gil =

Filipino physician, journalist, and legislator

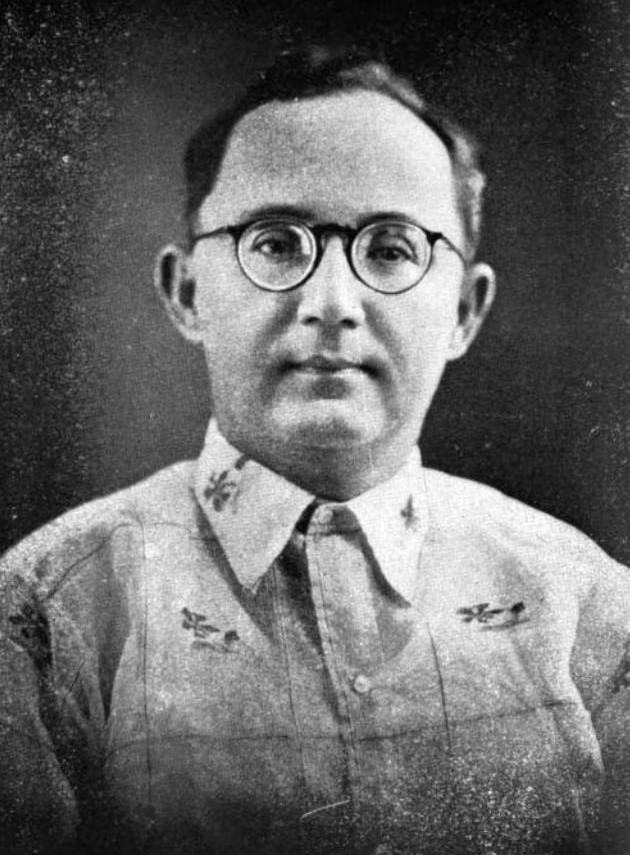
- Photograph from The Commercial & Industrial Manual of the Philippines, 1941

Ambassador of the Philippines to Argentina
- In office November 1956 – March 1962
- President: Ramon Magsaysay; Carlos P. Garcia; Diosdado Macapagal
- Preceded by: Narciso Ramos
- Succeeded by: Pelayo Llamas

Member of the National Assembly from Manila's 2nd district
- In office September 16, 1935 – December 30, 1941
- Preceded by: Alfonso Mendoza
- Succeeded by: District dissolved (Position next held by Alfonso Mendoza)

Member of the Philippine House of Representatives from Manila's 2nd district
- In office June 5, 1928 – June 2, 1931
- Preceded by: Alfonso Mendoza
- Succeeded by: Prudencio Remigio

Personal details
- Born: November 13, 1889 Capiz, Captaincy General of the Philippines
- Died: January 5, 1965 (aged 75) Manila, Philippines
- Party: Nacionalista
- Spouse(s): Consuelo Cabangis; Virginia Amacio
- Children: 3
- Education: Colegio de San Juan de Letran (BA); University of Santo Tomas (M.D)
- Occupation: Journalist, legislator
- Profession: Physician

Pedro Gil y Hernández (Spanish pronunciation: [ˈpeðɾo ˈxil i eɾˈnandes]; November 13, 1889 – January 5, 1965) was a Filipino physician, journalist, and legislator. He served in different distinguished roles—as a labor leader, as a doctor of medicine, as a crusading newspaperman, as a social worker, and as a conscientious legislator.

== Early life ==
He was born in the then-town of Capiz (now Roxas City) in Capiz on November 13, 1889, the youngest of the seven children of a French-born Spaniard Pedro Araguez Gil, a government employee in Capiz, and Petra Hernández. His mother died when he was hardly six months old, and he was brought to Manila and reared in the home of his sisters in Ermita. He was eight years old when his father died.

== Student ==
The Gils were not wealthy and left no fortune to their children. But in spite of their difficulties, his brothers and sisters managed to send him to the Escuela Normal de San Javier, where he completed a commercial course. How he was able to do that was a story of hardship and sacrifices. To support him through his studies his sisters accepted some sewing work. He himself did odd jobs for the school's Jesuit priest and so was exempted from paying tuition fees.

Gil next enrolled at the San Juan de Letran, where he earned his Bachelor of Arts degree. He then proceeded to take up medicine at the University of Santo Tomas, supporting himself by teaching at the Instituto de Burgos in the evening. In due time, he finished the course, passed the examination given by the Board of Medical Practitioners, and established a clinic which immediately became popular with the masses of Paco and Ermita.

Dr. Gil started his political career as a rabid oppositionist. Even while he was still a student, he was already closely identified with opposition groups. He was an active writer on political subjects and a frequent leader of movements censuring the party then in power for abuses in the government. He once led a strike against Meralco.

== Journalist ==
Ever eager to reach the masses, he published a newspaper dedicated to the laboring classes, Los Obreros. When it folded, he edited a number of others, like La Nación. He directed this last newspaper until 1923.

When the Jones Law was still pending in Congress, he organized mass meetings and in a popular manifestation, led in the signing of a manifesto urging the legislative body to include in the said law "a definite date for independence."

== Politician ==
In 1928, he was elected representative for the second district of Manila on the Nacionalista Democratra party ticket. He became Minority Floor Leader in the House of Representatives of the Philippines and distinguished himself as a fiscalizer of the abused and the tyranny of those in power. He was designated member of the 1930 independence mission to the United States and stayed for some time in Washington, D.C. together with Sergio Osmeña, Manuel Roxas, Ruperto Montinola, and Emiliano Tria Tirona. This mission is credited with having worked for the passage of the first independence law for the Philippines.

He was elected to the first National Assembly and became chairman of the committee on the city government and several other important committees.

As an assemblyman, he worked for the reduction of public utility rates in the city of Manila, such as those charged by Meralco and the Manila Gas Corporation. He himself presented a test case against them with the Public Service Commission. Arguing that their rates were "boom period" rates and needed to be reduced, he offered comprehensive statistics to show that Manila residents were paying more than they should for gas and electric power services. He stressed that the current rates were too heavy for the poor to shoulder.

Likewise, he pioneered the movement for higher wages for laborers, authoring a bill to this effect.

== Diplomat ==
Gil served as envoy to Argentina from 1956 to 1962 and was a recipient of the General San Martín medal, Argentina's highest diplomatic award.

== Personal life ==
Puyat was married to Consuelo Cabangis. They had only one child, Patria, who became the wife of Deogracias Puyat, a lawyer. His granddaughter and Patria's daughter, Maria Consuelo Puyat-Reyes, also served as a representative for Makati and envoy to Chile.

When Consuelo died, Pedro Gil met Virginia Amacio in Capiz and had two daughters, Carmencita and Guia.

== Legacy ==
Herran Street, an east-west inner city street and a tertiary national road in south-central Manila was renamed in his honor and memory.
