= List of ambassadors of the Philippines to the United Kingdom =

Ambassador of the Republic of the Philippines to the United Kingdom of Great Britain and Northern Ireland
- Sugo ng Republika ng Pilipinas sa Nagkakaisang Kaharian ng Dakilang Britanya at Hilagang Irlanda
- Seal of the Department of Foreign Affairs of the Philippines

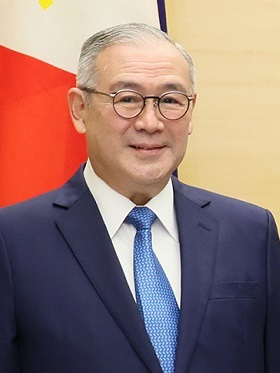
- Incumbent; Teodoro Locsin Jr. since August 30, 2022
- Department of Foreign Affairs; Embassy of the Philippines, London
- Style: His Excellency
- Reports to: Department of Foreign Affairs
- Seat: 6-11 Suffolk Street, London, United Kingdom
- Nominator: Secretary of Foreign Affairs
- Appointer: President of the Philippines; with the advice and consent of the Commission on Appointments
- Term length: No fixed term
- Inaugural holder: Don Ramón J. Fernandez
- Formation: July 4, 1946
- Deputy: Maria Fe Pangilinan (Note: Deputy Chief of Mission); Raphael Hermoso (Note: Deputy Chief of Mission, Consul and Deputy Permanent Representative to the IMO)
- Website: Philippine Embassy, London

The ambassador of the Republic of the Philippines to the United Kingdom (Filipino: Sugo ng Republika ng Pilipinas sa Nagkakaisang Kaharian ng Dakilang Britanya at Hilagang Irlanda), known formally in the United Kingdom as the ambassador of the Republic of the Philippines to the Court of St James's, is the Republic of the Philippines' foremost diplomatic representative in the United Kingdom. As head of the Philippines' diplomatic mission there, the ambassador is the official representative of the president and the government of the Philippines to the king and government of the United Kingdom of Great Britain and Northern Ireland. The position has the rank and status of an ambassador extraordinary and plenipotentiary and is based at the embassy at 6-11 Suffolk Street, London, United Kingdom. The Philippine ambassador to the United Kingdom is also accredited as non-resident ambassador to the Republic of Ireland.

The position is currently held by former Secretary of Foreign Affairs Teodoro Locsin Jr. since August 30, 2022, of whom he presented his credentials to King Charles III on May 16, 2023.

== History ==
Diplomatic relations between the Philippines and the United Kingdom were established on July 4, 1946, following the British government's recognition of the Philippines' independence from the United States' 48-year colonial rule. The two countries previously fought on the same side under the Allied Powers during the Second World War. Three Ambassadors were once the Secretary of Foreign Affairs of the Philippines: Manuel Yan, Teodoro Locsin, and Enrique Manalo.

== List of ambassadors to the United Kingdom (1946–present) ==
Image	Ambassador	Tenure	British monarch	British prime minister	Philippine president	Note(s)
	Don Ramón J. Fernández	1946–1949	George VI	Clement Attlee	Manuel Roxas; Elpidio Quirino	First and only Minister Plenipotentiary.
	José E. Romero	1949–1953	George VI; Elizabeth II	Clement Attlee; Winston Churchill	Elpidio Quirino; Ramon Magsaysay	First Ambassador Extraordinary and Plenipotentiary.
	León María Guerrero III	1954–1962	Elizabeth II	Winston Churchill; Anthony Eden; Harold Macmillan	Ramon Magsaysay; Carlos P. Garcia	
	Melquiades J. Gamboa	1962–1963	Elizabeth II	Harold Macmillan	Diosdado Macapagal	
	Marcial P. Lichauco	1963–1966	Elizabeth II	Harold Macmillan; Alec Douglas-Home; Harold Wilson	Diosdado Macapagal; Ferdinand Marcos	
	Narciso G. Reyes	1966–1970	Elizabeth II	Harold Wilson	Ferdinand Marcos	He would later serve as Secretary General of the ASEAN from 1980 to 1982.
	Jaime Zóbel de Ayala	1970–1975	Elizabeth II	Edward Heath; Harold Wilson	Ferdinand Marcos	
	José Manuel Stilianopoulos	1977–1982	Elizabeth II	James Callaghan; Margaret Thatcher	Ferdinand Marcos	
	Jose Vicente Cruz	1982–1985	Elizabeth II	Margaret Thatcher	Ferdinand Marcos	
	Juan T. Quimson	1986–1988	Elizabeth II	Margaret Thatcher	Ferdinand Marcos; Corazon Aquino	
	Tomas T. Syquia	1989–1990	Elizabeth II	Margaret Thatcher	Corazon Aquino; Fidel V. Ramos	
	Manuel T. Yan	1991–1992	Elizabeth II	John Major	Corazon Aquino; Fidel V. Ramos	
	Jesus P. Tambunting	1993–1998	Elizabeth II	John Major; Tony Blair	Fidel V. Ramos	
	Maria Rowena Mendoza Sánchez	1998	Elizabeth II	Tony Blair	Joseph Estrada	
	Cesar B. Bautista	1999–2003	Elizabeth II	Tony Blair	Joseph Estrada; Gloria Macapagal Arroyo	
	Edgardo B. Espiritu	2003–2009	Elizabeth II	Tony Blair; Gordon Brown	Gloria Macapagal Arroyo	
	Antonio M. Lagdameo	2009–2010	Elizabeth II	Gordon Brown; David Cameron	Gloria Macapagal Arroyo	First term.
	Reynaldo A. Catapang	2010–2011	Elizabeth II	David Cameron; Theresa May	Benigno Aquino III	
	Enrique A. Manalo	2011–2016	Elizabeth II	David Cameron; Theresa May	Benigno Aquino III	Credentials were presented to Her Majesty the Queen on December 14, 2011. He would later be appointed as Ambassador and Permanent Representative of the Philippines to the United Nations in 2020, and as Secretary of Foreign Affairs in 2017 (in ad-interim capacity) and again in 2022 (in full capacity).
	Evan P. Garcia	2016–2017	Elizabeth II	Theresa May; Boris Johnson	Rodrigo Duterte	
	Antonio M. Lagdameo	2017–2022	Elizabeth II	Theresa May; Boris Johnson	Rodrigo Duterte	Second term. Credentials were presented to Her Majesty the Queen on March 8, 2017. He would later be appointed as Ambassador and Permanent Representative of the Philippines to the United Nations on July 7, 2022.
	Teodoro L. Locsin Jr.	2022–present	Elizabeth II; Charles III	Boris Johnson; Liz Truss; Rishi Sunak; Keir Starmer; Andy Burnham	Bongbong Marcos	Appointed by President Marcos Jr. on August 30, 2022. Credentials were presented to His Majesty the King on May 16, 2023.

== See also ==
- Philippines–United Kingdom relations
- List of ambassadors of the United Kingdom to the Philippines
- Foreign relations of the Philippines
- Foreign relations of the United Kingdom
