= Philippines and the United Nations =

Republic of the Philippines

United Nations membership
- Membership: Full member
- Since: October 24, 1945
- Former name(s): Commonwealth of the Philippines (1945–1946)
- UNSC seat: Non-permanent
- Permanent Representative: Enrique Manalo

The Republic of the Philippines and the United Nations have been affiliated since the conception of the organization. The then Commonwealth of the Philippines was one of the signatories of the 1942 UN Declaration, from which the U.N. Charter of 1945 was based on. The Philippines was also among the 51 original member states, one of only four Asian nations, and the only nation in Southeast Asia, that signed this charter, which marked the beginning of the UN operations.

Since then, the Philippines has been active participants of the UN through various programs and commitments. Some of which include the Millennium Development Goals, the International Convention on the Protection of the Rights of All Migrant Workers and Members of their Families, the Convention against Illicit Traffic in Narcotic Drugs, among others. The Philippines consistently send peacekeepers to the U.N. The United Nations are also staffed by a large percentage of Filipinos. At the same time, the U.N. provides the Philippines with assistance in the event of calamities, and help the country raise funds for various causes.

In 2016, the United Nations have been alarmed by the state of human rights in the country. During the 59th session of the International Covenant on Economic, Social and Cultural Rights last September 2016, held in Geneva, Switzerland, the Philippines was due for its periodic review. In this review, some issues that the U.N. committee brought up included the war on drugs of the administration, overcrowding in Philippine prisons, and forced eviction of informal settlers. In March 2017, the U.N. also urged the Philippines not to reinstate the death penalty as it is in violation of the country's commitment under international law.

== History ==
The Philippines signed the Declaration by United Nations on June 10, 1942. The declaration agreed to the policies of the Atlantic Charter, a joint declaration between the United States and Great Britain that set out a vision for a post-war world. The text of the declaration affirmed the signatories' perspective "that complete victory over their enemies is essential to defend life, liberty, independence and religious freedom, and to preserve human rights and justice in their own lands as well as in other lands, and that they are now engaged in a common struggle against savage and brutal forces seeking to subjugate the world".

The document was the basis of the establishment of the United Nations in 1945.

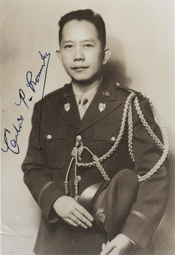
Carlos P. Romulo, the President of the Fourth Session of the UN General Assembly

The UN system in the Philippines began in 1945 when the Philippines, along with 49 other nations, signed the UN Charter in San Francisco, USA. The relationship between the Philippine government and UN is underscored by the contributions made by Carlos P. Romulo who acted as Philippine delegate to the United Nations Organization Conference and then became the Philippine ambassador to the United Nations from 1946 to 1954. Romulo eventually became the first Asian president during the 4th UN General Assembly.

Financial and other forms of assistance to the Philippines began in the late 1940s as the country recovered from the damages of World War II. This partnership has grown since then into a number of development initiatives, activities and programmes.

In August 2013, Filipino peacekeepers were held under siege by Syrian rebels in Golan Heights. They successfully escaped their outpost after being trapped for five days while being were surrounded by Syrian rebels. Filipino troops were eventually pulled out from Syria.

Being part of UN, Philippines files an arbitration case against China at the UN-backed Permanent Court of Arbitration (PCA) to settle the maritime dispute over South China Sea in 2013. The country asked the arbitral tribunal to uphold the United Nations Convention on the Law of the Sea (UNCLOS), which grants exclusive rights to explore and develop maritime features 200 nautical miles from its baselines. On 12 July 2016, the tribunal ruled in favor of the Philippines. The tribunal also ruled that China has "no historical rights" based on the "nine-dash line" map. However, China has rejected the ruling.

In July 2017, President Rodrigo Duterte hit the UN for allegedly interfering in the affairs of the Philippines. Duterte issued this statement after the executive director of the UN Office on Drugs and Crime (UNODC), Yury Fedotov, joined UN Secretary-General Ban Ki-moon in criticizing his administration's war against illegal drugs.

In the 59th session of the UN Committee on Economic, Social and Cultural Rights last year, Philippines was assessed in terms of its compliance with the "International Covenant on Economic, Social and Cultural Rights." The committee probed the Philippine delegation on issues, such as the issue of extrajudicial killings, labor, and human trafficking.

== United Nations-Philippines relations ==
=== United Nations entities present in the Philippines ===
The presence of the United Nations in the Philippines is found in the different globally-established subsidiaries, specialized agencies, and programmes the organization has enforced in the country. Each entity focuses on a particular social issue or addresses a specific need the UN aims to respond to. Currently, there are twenty-one bodies in the UN system present in the country.

Entity	Description	Headquarters	Featured Projects
Food and Agriculture Association	As a knowledge organization, FAO creates and shares critical information about food, agriculture and natural resources in the form of global public good.	14th Floor, North Tower Rockwell Business Sheridan Tower, Sheridan Street Highway Hills, Mandaluyong City	Technical Cooperation Programme (TCP), Government Cooperative Programme, Joint Programme, Telefood Project
Joint United Nations Programme on HIV/AIDS (UNAIDS)	The main advocate for global action on HIV and AIDS, UNAIDS leads, strengthen and supports and expanded response to the epidemic.	Rm 213, Philippine Social Science Center Building, Commonwealth Avenue	International Women's Day, Fast Track, World Aids Day, Global Aids Update
International Finance Corporation	The IFC promotes sustainable private sector investment in developing countries as a way to reduce poverty and improve peoples' lives. Established in 1956, IFC is the largest multilateral source of loan and equity financing for private sector projects in the developing world.	23rd Floor, One Global Place 5th Avenue corner 25th Street Bonifacio Global City, Taguig 1634	Loan, Equity, Guarantee, Risk Management Services for private and public projects
International Labour Organization (ILO)	The ILO brings together the governments and employers' and workers' organizations of its 178 Member States in common action to improve social protection and conditions of life and work throughout the world.	19th Floor, Yuchengco Tower 6819 Ayala Avenue Makati City 1200	Decent Work initiative
International Maritime Organization (IMO)	IMO is the United Nations specialized agency with responsibility for the safety and security of shipping and the prevention of marine pollution by ships.	7th floor, First Maritime Place 7458 Bagtican Street, San Antonio Village Makati City	IMO-European Union Project on Capacity Building for Climate Change Mitigation, GloBallast Programme, GloMEEP, IMO-Norad Projects on marine environment and on ship recycling, Global Initiative Projects, Marine Electronic Highway (MEH)
International Monetary Fund (IMF)	IMF is an organization of 188 countries, working to foster global monetary cooperation, secure financial stability, facilitate international trade, promote high employment and sustainable economic growth, and reduce poverty around the world.	Rm 407 5-Storey Building BSP Complex A. Mabini Street, Malate Manila 1004	World Economic Outlook, Global Financial Stability Report, Fiscal Monitor, External Sector Report, International Reserve Asset
International Organization for Migration (IOM)	The IOM is committed to the principle that humane and orderly migration can benefit everyone.	28th Floor Citibank Tower Condominium 8741 Paseo de Roxas 1226 Makati City Philippines	Co-lead agency of the Department of Social Welfare and Development (DSWD)
Office of Coordination of Humanitarian Affairs (OCHA)	OCHA is mandated to coordinate the UN's humanitarian response, policy development and humanitarian advocacy.	Not Available	Emergency Response Preparedness, Response to sudden onset emergencies, Mindanao protracted conflict situation
The World Bank (WB)	The World Bank contributes to the National Development Agenda through policy advice and financing on priority medium-term structural issues.	26th Floor, One Global Place 5th Ave. corner 25th St. Bonifacio Global City, Taguig City Philippines 1634	Philippine Rural Development Project, Philippines Renewable Energy Development, Access to Sustainable Energy Project
United Nations Children's Fund (UNICEF)	UNICEF is devoted to guaranteeing the rights of all children to survival, development, protection and participation.	14th Floor, North Tower Rockwell Business Sheridan Tower Sheridan Street Highway Hills Mandaluyong City, Philippines 1552	WASH Programme, Modified Conditional Cash Transfer Programme (MCCT), Early Childhood Care and Development (ECCD)
United Nations Development Programme (UNDP)	UNDP works towards achieving the millennium development goals (MDGs) specifically focusing on social development, good governance, peace and environment and natural resources.	15th Floor North Tower Rockwell Business Sheridan Tower, Sheridan Street Highway Hills Mandaluyong City 1552 Philippines	Philippines Poverty Environment Initiative, Early Recovery and Rehabilitation for Central Mindanao (ERRCM) Project, Project ReBUILD, STREEM, GMMA READY Project
United Nations Educational, Scientific and Cultural Organization (UNESCO)	The main objective of UNESCO is to contribute to peace and security in the world by promoting collaboration among nations through education, science, culture and communication.	G/F, Department of Foreign Affairs Bldg., 2330, Roxas Boulevard, Pasay	Embedment Mooring System for Tubbataha World Heritage Site, Business Planning for World Heritage Site managers, Supporting community-based management and sustainable tourism
United Nations Entity for Gender Equality and Empowerment of Women (UN Women)	UN Women works to promote gender equality between women and men, and to advance the status of women. UNIFEM brings women's interests and concerns to the world development agenda.	Philippine Social Science Council, Rms. 209 & 211, Commonwealth Ave, Diliman Quezon City, Metro Manila 1100	Convention on Elimination of Discrimination Against Women (CEDAW) Programme, Promoting and protecting migrant women's rights in the Philippines, UN Women's Safe Cities Global Programme
United Nations High Commissioner for Refugees (UNHCR)	The agency is mandated to lead and coordinate international action to protect refugees and resolve refugee problems worldwide.	6th Flr GC Corporate Plaza 150 Legaspi St., Legaspi Village Makati City 1229	Protection Cluster, Reduce statelessness, empower displaced families in Mindanao
United Nations Human Settlements Programme (UN-Habitat)	UN-HABITAT's mission is to promote socially and environmentally sustainable human settlements development and the achievement of adequate shelter for all.	14th Floor, North Tower, Rockwell Business Sheridan Tower, Sheridan Street, Highway Hills, Mandaluyong City 1552	FACES, Strengthening Philippine capacity to address climate change impacts, Joint Country Programme on water and sanitation, Permanent shelter project, Coordination arrangements in the Asia Pacific region, City Development Initiative
United Nations Population Fund (UNFPA)	UNFPA is the largest international source of support in population and development, reproductive health and gender empowerment.	15/F North Tower Rockwell Business Sheridan Tower, Sheridan Street, Highway Hills Mandaluyong City 1552	UNFPA 7th Country Programme of Assistance
United Nations Industrial Development Organization	UNIDO is the specialized agency of the United Nations that promotes industrial development for poverty reduction, inclusive globalization and environmental sustainability.	14/F North Tower Rockwell Business Sheridan Tower Sheridan Street Highway Hills Mandaluyong City 1552	The Philippine Industrial Energy Efficiency Project, Improve the Health and Environment of Artisanal Gold Mining Communities in Southeast Asia by Reducing Mercury Emissions, Sector Plan to Phase-out HCFC-141b in the Foam Sector in the Philippines
United Nations Volunteers (UNV)	The UNV programme is the UN organization that contributes to peace and development through volunteerism worldwide.	UNDP 30/F Yuchengco Tower, RCBC PLAZA, 6819 Ayala Ave. Cor. Gil Puyat Ave. MAKATI CITY 1226 PHILIPPINES	Not Applicable (administered by UNDP)
World Food Programme (WFP)	WFP seeks to eradicate global hunger and poverty. It meets emergency needs, supports economic & social development and works to put hunger at the centre of the international agenda.	17th Floor, RCBC Savings Bank Corporate Center, 26th & 25th Streets, Bonifacio Global City, Taguig City, 1634 Philippines	Emergency Operations (EMOP), Protracted Relief and Recovery Operations (PRRO), Assisting conflict-affected communities build resilience
World Health Organization (WHO)	WHO is a specialized agency within the Charter of the United Nations and was established in 1948 "for the purpose of co-operation among themselves and with others to promote the health for all people."	National Tuberculosis Centre Building Second Floor, Bldg. 9 Department of Health San Lazaro Hospital, Compound Sta. Cruz, Manila	Tobacco Free Initiative, working to end tuberculosis by 2030, providing assistance to national efforts against dengue

=== Contributions to the Philippines ===
In the 75 years that the Republic of the Philippines has been a member of the United Nations, the specialized agencies of this international organization has always provided support to its member nations.

Food Security

Organizations such as World Food Programme (WFP) and the Food and Agricultural Organization (FAO) have intervened in the country's issues with regard to hunger and food shortage. According to Social Weather Survey, approximately 3.4 million Filipino families experience involuntary hunger during the latter part of 2016. the Global Food Security Index ranked the Philippines 72nd of 109.

The WFP has provided nutritious meals for children aged 6–59 months, pregnant and nursing women, and livelihood programs for those affected by natural disasters and conflict.. The WFP, in partnership with the government agency FNRI or Food and Nutrition Research Institute have developed specially enhanced local produce and micronutrient powder for better health of Filipino children.

The FAO on the other hand focus on the Agricultural issues of the country. The FAO support areas in The Autonomous Region in Muslim Mindanao (ARMM) that are affected by conflict by rehabilitating local agriculture and fisheries-based livelihoods of more than 4 million farmers.

Climate Change and Risk Reduction

The UNDP or United Nations Development Programme, along with the Australian Government contributed 172 million pesos to the RAPID or Resilience and Preparedness towards Inclusiveness Development program for typhoon affected areas. This presence is established in about 12 Local Government Units in the Eastern Visayas Area.

Disaster Response and Recovery

In one of the country's most dire time of need, the UN along with its network for humanitarian organizations banded together in order to aid the country in the sectors of Health, Shelter, Nutrition, and Economic Activity. According to the UN Office for Coordination of Humanitarian Affairs, the total funds donated reached about $469 million.

Health

The United Nations Children's Emergency Fund (UNICEF) has addressed the issue of Infant and Maternal Mortality in the Philippines by allocating a number of birth attendant and maternal facilities to the country. Due to this, the number of health facilities in more rural areas as well as birthing centers has increased, especially in more remote areas such as Sarangani and Eastern Samar. Aside from this, the same organization also assists the efforts of the Department of Health when it comes to preventing diseases with vaccines in especially high-risk areas in the Mindanao area and the Cordillera Regions.

Education

UNICEF also assists in the Government's program that promotes a universal kindergarten called The Early Childhood Care and Development Program. The program is deployed in vulnerable areas that are subject to poverty, conflict or natural disasters such as Mountain Province, Masbate, Eastern Samar, North Cotobato, Sarangani, Davao, Maguindanao, and Manila. Other than kindergartens, UNICEF also has a hand in establishing more child-friendly models and practices to be followed by more than 5.3 thousand primary schools and 61 high schools as well as contributions to education policies drafted by the Department of Education (DepEd).

Peace and Security

During the dispute between the Philippines and China for the South China Sea, the arbitral tribunal, at the request of the country upheld the United Nations Convention on the Law of the Sea which dictates exclusive rights to utilize the seas within 200 nautical miles in whatever way they see fit.

=== Role of the Philippines in the United Nations ===
Filipinos in the UN

Several Filipinos have served in various UN bodies and offices in high-level capacities. Most notable among them is Carlos P. Romulo, who served as president of the 4th Session of the UN General Assembly from 1949 to 1950, becoming the first Asian person to serve in the role. Heidi Mendoza, former commissioner of audit, served as the head the United Nations Office of Internal Oversight Services (OIOS) from 2015 to 2019, with the rank of under-secretary-general. Other notable Filipinos who have served in the UN include:

- Cesar Bengzon - Judge of the International Court of Justice from 1967 to 1976
- Rafael Salas - the first Executive Director of the United Nations Population Fund, served from its inception in 1969 to 1987
- Leticia Ramos-Shahani - Assistant Secretary-General for Social Development and Humanitarian Affairs from 1981 to 1986
- Domingo Siazon Jr. - Director-General of the United Nations Industrial Development Organization from 1985 to 1992
- Jaime de los Santos - Force Commander of the United Nations Transitional Administration in East Timor in 2000
- Natalio Ecarma III - Commander of the United Nations Disengagement Observer Force from 2010 to 2013
- Miriam Defensor Santiago - Judge of the International Criminal Court from 2012 to 2014
- Raul Pangalangan - Judge of the International Criminal Court from 2015 to 2021

The country has also been elected by the General Assembly four times to become a non-permanent member of the Security Council. The following people have served as president of the Security Council:

Filipino Presidents of the UN Security Council
Name	Security Council Term	Date of Presidency	Credentials
Carlos P. Romulo	1957	January 1957 December 1957	Permanent Representative of the Philippines to the United Nations
Jacinto Borja	1963	September 1963	Permanent Representative of the Philippines to the United Nations
Carlos P. Romulo	1980-1981	July 1980 September 1981	Minister of Foreign Affairs
Delia Albert	2004-2005	June 2004	Secretary of Foreign Affairs
Lauro Baja Jr.	2004-2005	June 2004	Permanent Representative of the Philippines to the United Nations
Lauro Baja Jr.	2004-2005	June 2004 September 2005	Permanent Representative of the Philippines to the United Nations
Lauro Baja Jr.	2004-2005	September 2005	Permanent Representative of the Philippines to the United Nations
Bayani Mercado	2004-2005	September 2005	Deputy Permanent Representative of the Philippines to the United Nations
Gloria Macapagal Arroyo	2004-2005	September 2005	Head of Government (President of the Philippines)
Alberto Romulo	2004-2005	September 2005	Secretary of Foreign Affairs

Coalition co-founder

The country is one of the co-founders of the G-77 coalition. The Group of 77 is the largest intergovernmental organization of developing countries in the United Nations, which provides the means for the countries of the South to articulate and promote their collective economic interests and enhance their joint negotiating capacity on all major international economic issues within the United Nations system, and promote South-South cooperation for development.

Peacekeepers

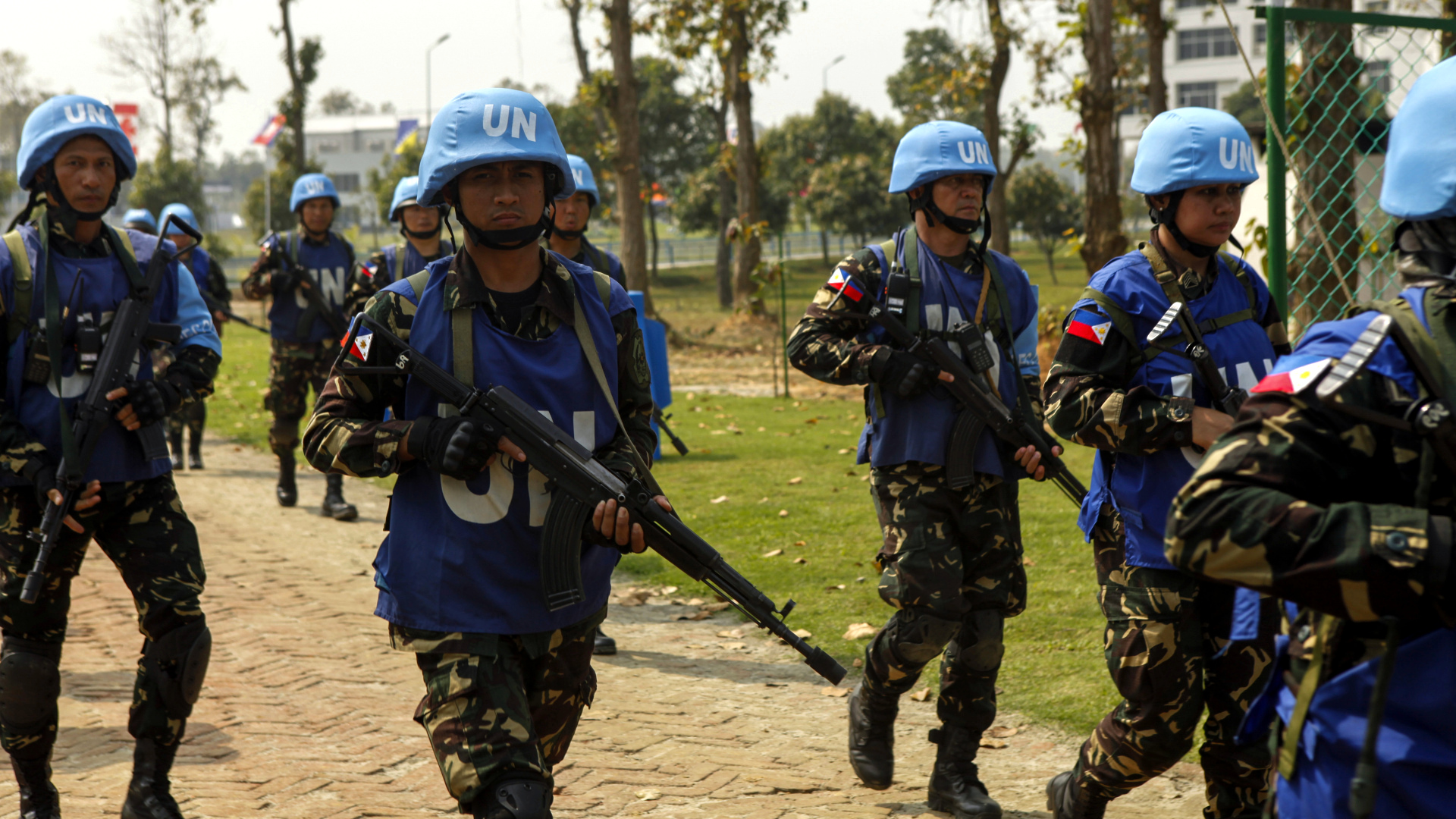
Philippine Marines participating in Exercise Shanti Toot 4, a multi-national peacekeeping exercise in Bangladesh

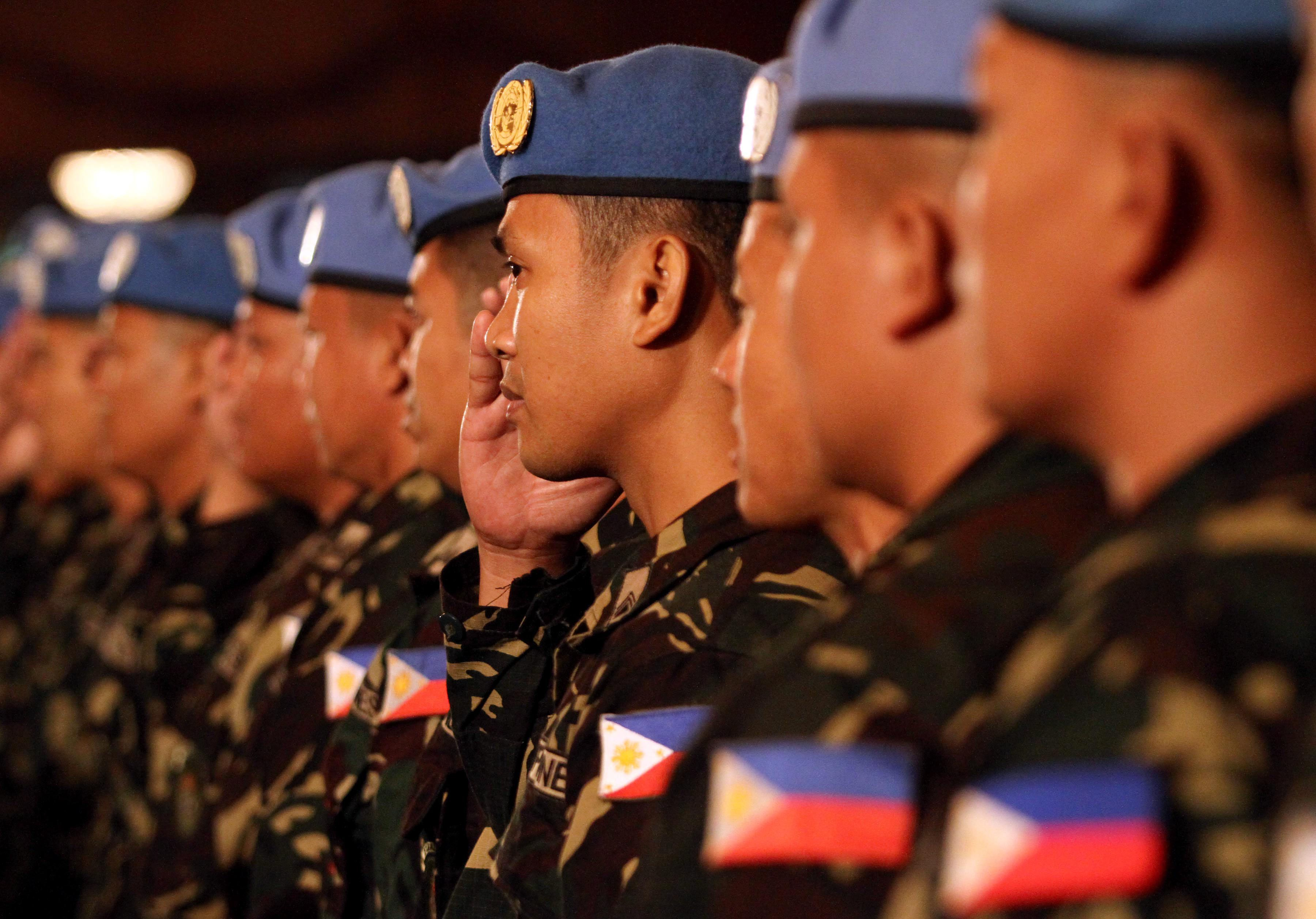
7th Philippine UN Peacekeepers Contingent to the Golan Heights

Instead of having its own standing army, the UN has a peacekeeping force (also known as "Blue Helmets" and "Blue Berets") composed of military and police personnel contributed by member states. As of 2014, the Philippines has contributed 37 police officers, 6 military experts, and 137 troops to the UN peacekeepers. The 6 military experts from the Philippines are part of the United Nations Military Observer Group in India and Pakistan, while the 37 police officers and 137 troops are part of the United Nations Stabilization Mission in Haiti. The Philippines is regarded as one of the most active countries in the Asia and Pacific region in terms of peace support troop contribution – the 4th among ASEAN members states, and 60th worldwide.

Golan Heights Incidents

On two separate incidents in March and May 2013, Syrian rebels of the Yarmouk Martyrs Brigade abducted twenty-five Filipino peacekeepers on the ceasefire line between Syria and the Israeli-occupied Golan Heights after clashes in the area had put the peacekeepers in danger. They were under the United Nations Disengagement Observer Force (UNDOF) which was established a year after the 1973 Mideast war. It monitors the disengagement of Israeli and Syrian forces and maintains a cease-fire. The rebels demanded they will keep the peacekeepers hostage until President Assad and his forces withdraw from the Syrian city of Jamlah.

Twenty-one peacekeepers were abducted on March 6 and were later released three days later. Another four peacekeepers were abducted in early May but were also released after a few days. In response to the abductions Foreign secretary Albert Del Rosario suggested to then President Benigno Aquino III for the Philippines to withdraw its 344 peacekeepers from the Golan Heights. The United Nations, together with the United States, appealed to the Philippines and warned of an adverse effect of withdrawing Filipino peacekeepers from the volatile region. During a meeting with UN officials in New York, Del Rosario stated three conditions to the United Nations for a continued stay of Filipino peacekeepers in the Golan Heights:

1. The United Nations Disengagement Observer Force in the Golan Heights must deploy its full troop strength of 1,250 by October.
2. Provide the equipment for the protection and defense of Filipino troops.
3. The Philippines must be allowed to deploy troops using a six-month rotation.

In July 2013, Del Rosario said that he has dropped his recommendation to President Aquino for the withdrawal of Filipino peacekeepers and said that the UN officials promised to fulfill the three conditions laid by the government.

On 20 September 2014, as a direct result of the deteriorating conditions in the Syrian Civil War, the Philippine Government has announced a complete withdrawal of 344 peacekeepers from the UNDOF.

The peacekeepers received praise back home but was criticized by LTG Singha for a supposed "act of cowardice". However, on 9 October 2014, LTG Singha changed his tune as he briefed the UN Security Council on the situation of peacekeepers in the Golan Heights. He said that "the Filipino and Fijian peacekeepers bravely faced the situation, and exhibited raw courage, resilience and patience."

== Threats to Withdrawal ==
In an August 2016 press conference, the President of the Philippines, Rodrigo Duterte—angered at criticism from the United Nations over extrajudicial killings in the Philippine drug war—threatened to withdraw the Philippines from the United Nations. Duterte, addressing United Nations High Commissioner for Human Rights, Zeid Ra’ad al-Hussein said: "Maybe we'll just have to decide to separate from the United Nations. If you are that insulting, son of a bitch, we should just leave." Duterte also stated: "I will burn down the United States if I want. I will burn it down if I go to America."

Following a storm of international publicity, Duterte said the next day that his statement about pulling out of the UN was a "joke" while still criticizing the UN. Philippine Foreign Affairs Secretary Perfecto Yasay Jr. stated “We are committed to the UN despite our numerous frustrations with this international agency."

== See also ==
- Permanent Representative of the Philippines to the United Nations
