= Embassy of the Philippines, Dublin =

Diplomatic mission of the Philippines in Ireland

Embassy of the Philippines, Dublin Pasuguan ng Pilipinas sa Dublin Ambasáid na nOileáin Fhilipíneach i mBaile Átha Cliath
- Location: Dublin
- Address: 37 Mount Street Upper, Dublin 2
- Coordinates: 53°20′13.4″N 6°14′41.9″W
- Ambassador: Daniel R. Espiritu

The Embassy of the Philippines in Dublin is the diplomatic mission of the Republic of the Philippines to Ireland. It is located in central Dublin on Mount Street Upper within the Dublin 2 postal district, between St Stephen's Church and Merrion Square.

Although the current embassy dates from 2024, the Philippines also maintained a previous resident embassy in Ireland between 2009 and 2012.

== History ==
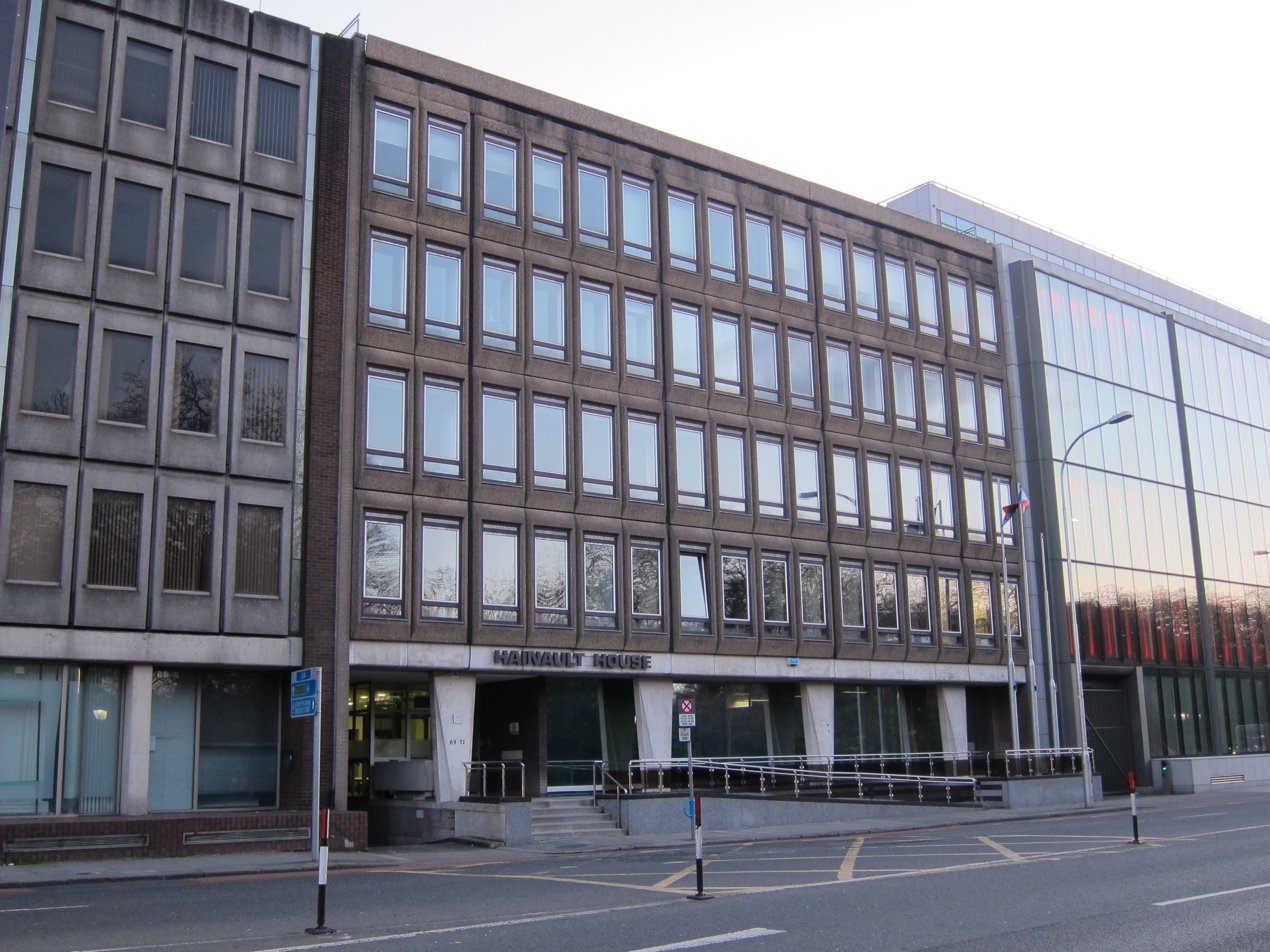
Prior to its closure in 2012, the Philippine Embassy in Dublin was located at the fourth floor of Hainault House on St Stephen's Green

Although diplomatic relations between the Philippines and Ireland were established in 1984, relations were initially conducted through an honorary consulate in Dublin which was under the jurisdiction of the Philippine Embassy in London. A resident embassy in Ireland was not opened until the presidency of Gloria Macapagal Arroyo, when the Philippine Embassy in Dublin was opened on July 9, 2009, offering consular services a week later.

Expansion of the Philippines' diplomatic presence abroad during the Arroyo presidency was not without controversy: in 2010, Senator Franklin Drilon questioned the need for embassies in countries with small Filipino communities, including a number of countries in Europe, and called for a review of the Philippines' diplomatic presence worldwide. This would lead to the closure of ten posts under Arroyo's successor, Benigno Aquino III, and ultimately to the closure of the embassy by October 31, 2012, which took effect nearly three months earlier on July 16, 2012. Ireland was then placed again under the jurisdiction of the Philippine Embassy in London, with services provided through a reopened honorary consulate, although Filipinos in Ireland have asked for the embassy to be reopened due to the limited services provided by the honorary consulate.

By 2019, the Philippine government had begun considering reopening a resident mission in Ireland, with Foreign Affairs Secretary Teodoro Locsin Jr. announcing that the Philippine Embassy in Dublin would reopen as part of an expansion of the country's diplomatic presence under Aquino's successor, Rodrigo Duterte. On November 15, 2022, during budget deliberations for the Department of Foreign Affairs (DFA), Senator Loren Legarda announced that the embassy was one of four missions that would reopen in 2024, and the DFA, spurred in part by the opening of the Irish Embassy in Manila in 2021, itself confirmed during a debate on Ireland–Philippines relations at Trinity College Dublin on May 30, 2024, that a resident mission in Ireland would reopen in late 2024.

The advance team setting up the embassy announced that they had arrived in Dublin on October 29, 2024, and are preparing to immediately begin offering consular services once the mission has completed all the required procedures for opening, doing so for limited consular services on December 6, 2024.

== Chancery ==
The chancery of the Philippine Embassy in Dublin was first located at 77 Sir John Rogerson's Quay, a temporary chancery that operated until a permanent chancery was inaugurated at the fourth floor of Hainault House on St Stephen's Green on November 30, 2010, coinciding with Bonifacio Day. An open house for the Filipino community in Ireland was held two days before to celebrate the occasion.

With the embassy's reopening, it was first headquartered at Baggot Rath House in Sandymount in the Dublin 4 postal district, near Aviva Stadium, before relocating to a temporary office space in neighboring Ballsbridge at Alexandra House on 3 Ballsbridge Park, near the Royal Dublin Society, on December 6, 2024. Two weeks later on December 19, 2024, it announced that it had begun the process of looking for a new permanent chancery.

On April 15, 2025, the embassy released bidding documents indicating that it had leased a three-story building on Northumberland Road in Ballsbridge to serve as its new permanent chancery. Although it had initially planned to vacate its current premises by April 30, 2025, this was later pushed back to July 30, 2025, and then again to August 29, 2025. However, documents were subsequently released showing that the chancery was no longer relocating to Northumberland Road in favor of a new location on Mount Street Upper, and the embassy announced on October 30, 2025 the opening of the new permanent chancery at 37 Mount Street Upper on November 4, 2025.

== Staff and activities ==
The Philippine Embassy in Dublin is headed by Ambassador Daniel R. Espiritu, who was appointed to the position by President Bongbong Marcos on August 4, 2024. Prior to his appointment as ambassador, Espiritu, a career diplomat, served as the DFA's assistant secretary for ASEAN affairs. His appointment was confirmed by the Commission on Appointments on September 10, 2024, and he arrived in Dublin to assume his post on April 22, 2025. He later presented his credentials to Irish President Michael D. Higgins on July 1, 2025.

== See also ==
- Ireland–Philippines relations
- List of diplomatic missions of the Philippines
- Filipinos in Ireland
