= Antonio Manuel Lagdameo =

Filipino businessman and diplomat

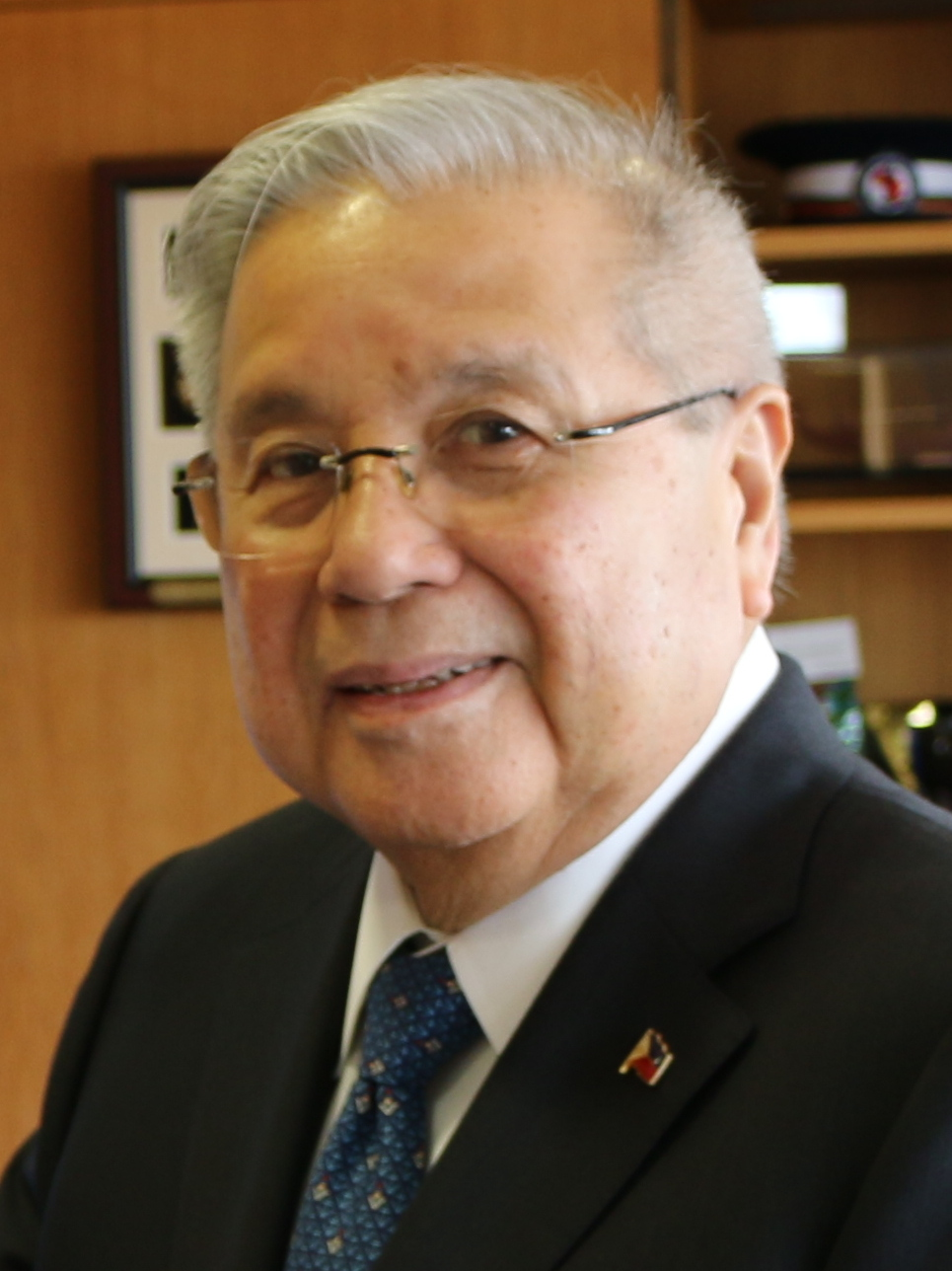
- Lagdameo in 2018

23rd Permanent Representative of the Philippines to the United Nations
- In office July 5, 2022 – July 31, 2025
- President: Bongbong Marcos
- Preceded by: Enrique Manalo
- Succeeded by: Enrique Manalo

Ambassador of the Philippines to the United Kingdom
- In office 2017–2022
- President: Rodrigo Duterte
- Preceded by: Evan P. Garcia
- Succeeded by: Teodoro Locsin Jr.
- In office 2009–2010
- President: Gloria Macapagal-Arroyo
- Preceded by: Edgardo B. Espiritu
- Succeeded by: Enrique Manalo

Ambassador of the Philippines to Spain
- In office August 23, 2008 – July 15, 2009
- President: Gloria Macapagal-Arroyo
- Preceded by: Joseph Delano M. Bernardo
- Succeeded by: Ana Ines de Sequera-Ugarte

Ambassador of the Philippines to Mexico
- In office 2007–2008
- President: Gloria Macapagal-Arroyo
- Preceded by: Justo Orros Jr.
- Succeeded by: Francisco Ortigas III

Personal details
- Born: Antonio Manuel Revilla Lagdameo; June 13, 1942 (age 84) Manila, Philippines
- Children: 7 (including Antonio Jr. and Jose Manuel)
- Education: University of the Philippines (AA); University of the East (BA); Ateneo de Manila University (MBA)
- Occupation: Businessman, diplomat

Antonio Manuel "Tonet" Revilla Lagdameo (born June 13, 1942) is a Filipino businessman and diplomat who previously served as the Permanent Representative of the Philippines to the United Nations from 2022 to 2025. Prior to that role, he was the Philippine Ambassador to the United Kingdom from 2016 to 2022, and previously from 2009 to 2010.

From 2007 to 2008, he served as the Philippine Ambassador to Mexico, with concurrent accreditation to Belize, Costa Rica, El Salvador, Guatemala, Honduras, Nicaragua and Panama. From 2008 to 2009, he was the Philippine Ambassador to Spain with concurrent jurisdiction over Andorra.

== Early life and education ==
Lagdameo is the son of Ernesto Lagdameo, who was Ambassador to the United States from 1969 to 1971 during the presidency of Ferdinand Marcos, and Pilar Revilla.

He initially considered a career in medicine during his time at the University of the Philippines where he obtained a pre-med associate in arts degree in 1961. However, he later shifted his focus to business, leading him to earn a bachelor's degree in accountancy from the University of the East in 1964. Subsequently, he pursued further education, graduating in 1971 with a graduate in business administration from Ateneo de Manila University.

== Career ==
Lagdameo mostly worked in the private sector and business before his diplomatic career. His private office and civic affiliations include being chairman of the board of Carrije Holdings, beginning in 2000 and vice chairman for House of Travel Inc. beginning in 1998, among others. In the 1990s, he was president of Lagbros Corporation and director-treasurer of the Industrial Underwriters and Commercial Corporation, and L & B Development Corporation.

He served as the sixth chairman of the Philippine Racing Commission from 1994 to 1998. Prior to this role, he had been a commissioner since 1993 and a former director of the Metropolitan Association of Race Horse Owners (MARHO).

=== Diplomatic career ===
Lagdameo's involvement in diplomacy began in 2007 when then-President Gloria Macapagal-Arroyo named him Ambassador to Mexico, with concurrent accreditation to Belize, Costa Rica, El Salvador, Guatemala, Honduras, Nicaragua and Panama. He took over the role from Ambassador Justo Orros Jr., the former governor of La Union, who had died while in office in 2006. Then, from 2008 to 2009, he was Ambassador to Spain and Andorra.

==== Ambassador to the United Kingdom ====
In 2009, he was appointed as the Ambassador to the United Kingdom and Ireland, which also made him the Ambassador to the International Maritime Organization. He held this role until the conclusion of the Arroyo administration in 2010. However, he returned to the same position in 2017 during the Duterte administration. As the ambassador, Lagdameo's primary focus was the well-being of the large Filipino community in the United Kingdom. He continued the practice of offering mobile consular services to Filipinos across his jurisdiction to streamline document processing. Additionally, he organized regular townhall gatherings at the embassy, known as "Kapihan sa Pasuguan" (Coffee at the Embassy), which provided Overseas Filipino Workers the opportunity to engage with high-level visitors. Furthermore, he actively promoted Filipino culture by collaborating with UK-based Philippine cultural organizations.

During the COVID-19 pandemic, Lagdameo was involved in the monitoring of affected Filipinos in the UK and Ireland, especially those in the frontline employed as healthcare workers. According to a 2019 report published by the National Health Service (NHS), Filipinos, who comprise around 19,000 of all NHS staff, are among the largest groups of NHS health workers, third to those who are identified as British and Indians. In May 2020, he called on the NHS to protect Filipino healthcare workers following reports that of the 173 frontline health and care workers who died due to COVID-19, approximately 13% were of Filipino heritage. Lagdameo was also involved in meetings which discussed the UK's vaccine development and access of ASEAN member states to said vaccines.

During the commencement of the 32nd session of the International Maritime Organization Assembly in December 2021, Lagdameo was chosen as its president, representing a significant first for the Philippines. He received a nomination from the United Kingdom's representative and was seconded by the South African representative. This election held particular significance as it coincided with the World Maritime Theme for 2021, which centered on the essential role of seafarers in the future of shipping. The Philippines is a major supplier of seafarers in the global shipping and transport industry, making Lagdameo's appointment particularly relevant.

==== Permanent Representative to the United Nations ====
In 2022, President Bongbong Marcos appointed Lagdameo as the Permanent Representative of the Philippines to the United Nations, succeeding Enrique Manalo, who had been appointed Foreign Affairs Secretary. Lagdameo took his oath of office on July 5 and was confirmed by the Commission on Appointments on August 31. He presented his credentials to UN Secretary-General António Guterres on September 7, 2022.

On October 28, 2023, the Philippines, represented by Lagdameo, faced criticism from some groups for abstaining from a United Nations resolution calling for an "immediate humanitarian truce" in Hamas-run Gaza amid the Gaza war. Addressing the General Assembly, Lagdameo said the Philippines was concerned about the "state of civilian casualties" but had reservations about the resolution, particularly the absence of any mention or condemnation of the 2023 Hamas attack that killed several Filipino workers.

On May 23, 2025, Executive Secretary Lucas Bersamin announced that Lagdameo would retire from his post on July 31, 2025. He will be succeeded by Foreign Affairs Secretary Enrique Manalo.

== Personal life ==
Lagdameo is married to Linda Floirendo-Lagdameo, daughter of Antonio Floirendo Sr., a close associate of Ferdinand Marcos. The couple celebrated their 50th golden wedding anniversary in November 2017. They are the parents of former congressman Anton Lagdameo, currently serving as the Special Assistant to Bongbong Marcos and a member of his Cabinet.

A horse racing enthusiast, Lagdameo, in his capacity as ambassador, shared a memorable moment from his meeting with Queen Elizabeth II during his presentation of credentials. During their initial encounter, the Queen recalled a horse race in which one of his horses had bested one of hers. The Queen displayed a sense of humor regarding the race's outcome, but also noted that the Queen Mother, had "taken it rather hard".

Diplomatic posts
Preceded by Justo Orros Jr.	Ambassador of the Philippines to Mexico; 2007–2008	Succeeded by Francisco Ortigas III
Preceded by Joseph Delano M. Bernardo	Ambassador of the Philippines to Spain; 2008–2009	Succeeded by Ana Ines de Sequera-Ugarte
Preceded by Edgardo B. Espiritu	Philippine Ambassador to the United Kingdom; 2009–2010	Succeeded by Enrique Manalo
Preceded by Evan Garcia	Philippine Ambassador to the United Kingdom; 2017–2022	Succeeded by Teodoro Locsin Jr.
Preceded by Enrique Manalo	Permanent Representative of the Philippines to the United Nations; 2022–present	Incumbent
