= Embassy of the Philippines, London =

Diplomatic mission of the Philippines in the United Kingdom

Embassy of the Philippines, London Pasuguan ng Pilipinas sa Londres

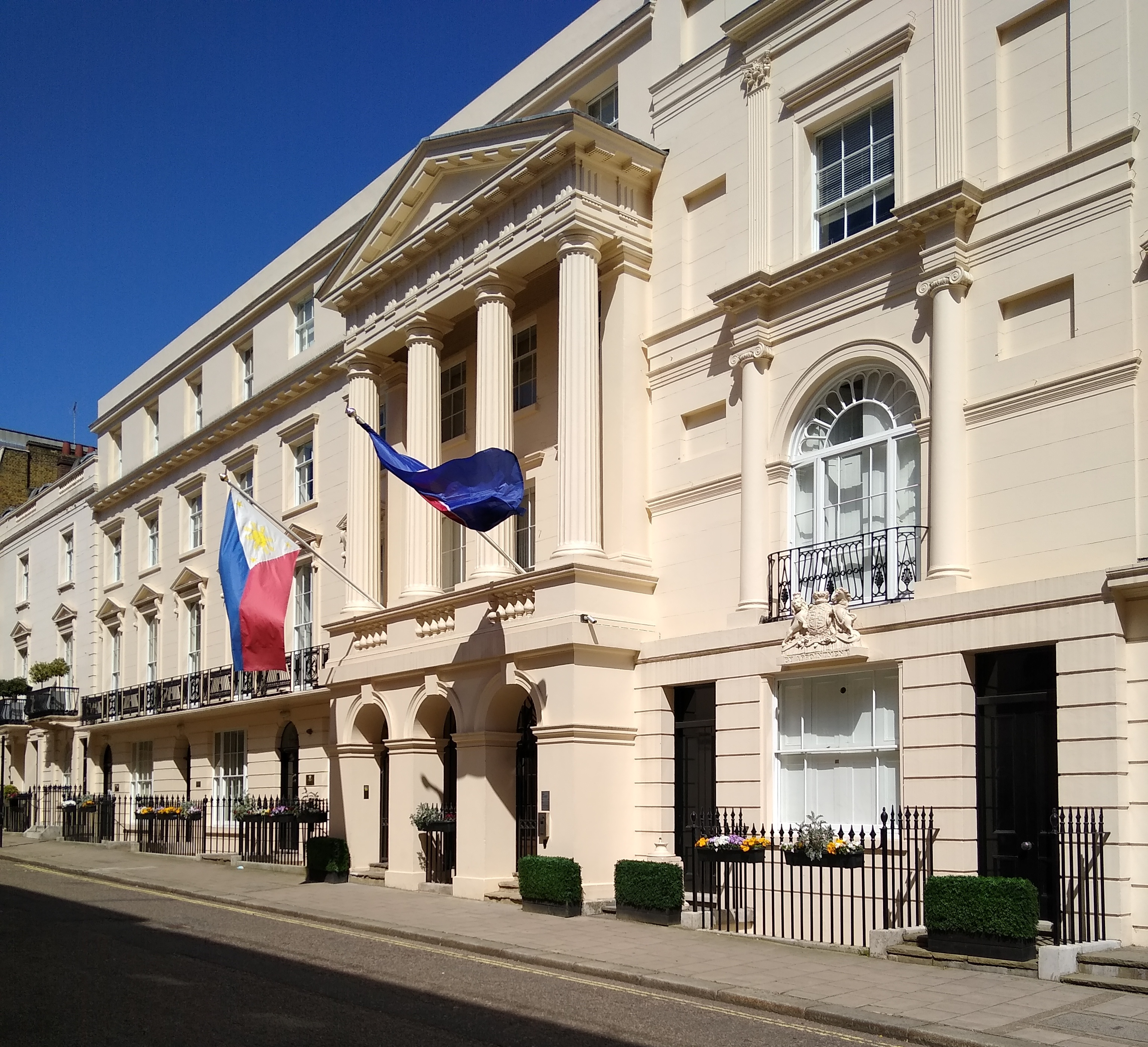
- Location: London
- Address: 6-11 Suffolk Street, St James's, City of Westminster
- Coordinates: 51°30′30.9″N 0°7′50.4″W
- Ambassador: Teodoro Locsin Jr.
- Website: http://londonpe.dfa.gov.ph

The Embassy of the Philippines in London is the diplomatic mission of the Republic of the Philippines to the United Kingdom. Opened in 1952, it is located on Suffolk Street, a cul-de-sac near Trafalgar Square in the St James's district of Westminster, part of the City of Westminster in central London. The Philippines also maintains a Trade Section in Belgravia.

== Staff and activities ==
The Philippine Embassy in London is headed by Ambassador Teodoro Locsin Jr., who was appointed to the position by President Bongbong Marcos on August 30, 2022. Locsin was previously Secretary of Foreign Affairs to Marcos's predecessor, Rodrigo Duterte, although it was initially rumored that he would be appointed by Marcos to the post he previously held prior to his appointment as DFA secretary, that of permanent representative to the United Nations. His appointment was confirmed by the Commission on Appointments on December 7, 2022, and he presented his credentials to King Charles III on May 16, 2023.

== See also ==
- Philippines–United Kingdom relations
- List of diplomatic missions of the Philippines
- Filipinos in the United Kingdom
