= Filipinos in Ireland =

Filipinos in Ireland Filipínis i Éirinn Ang mga Pilipino sa Irlanda
Total population
- 19,846 (2022 Census)

Regions with significant populations
- Limerick, Dublin

Languages
- Tagalog, Bisayâ, English (Philippine and Irish), Irish, Philippine languages,

Religion
- Majority Roman Catholicism

Related ethnic groups
- Filipino people, Overseas Filipinos

Filipinos in Ireland consist largely of migrant workers in the health care sector, though others work in tourism and information technology. From just 500 individuals in 1999, the first group of nurses arrived in April 2001 at the time six recruitments companies had been involved with the large influx of Filipino coming into Ireland they had grown to a population of 11,500 by 2007, a 2,200% expansion in just eight years.

In June 2009, the first Philippine embassy in Ireland opened its doors to the Filipino community it was long overdue according to the Filipino council of leaders. In August 2009 the Filipino community network was sworn in by the new ambassador Ariel Abadilia in the blessed sacrament church the following people where representatives of various communities in Ireland.

In 2023, an estimated 6,000 Filipino nurses were employed in the Irish healthcare system, which at 7% of the workforce formed the largest category of non-European Union workers in Ireland. According to Census 2016, there were 4,214 people of Filipino origin living in the state, a 67.1% drop from the 2011 figure of 12,791. However, by Census 2022 the number of respondents who listed The Philippines as their place of birth had risen to 19,846.

== Migration history ==
In 1990, the United Nations estimated that there were 774 Filipinos living in Ireland. Ireland began targeting the Philippines for recruitment of nurses in the late 1990s. From 2000 onwards, the Philippines was targeted as a major reservoir of nursing labour, and Ireland quickly became a major destination for Filipino nurses. By 2002 Ireland was the third largest importer of Filipino nurses, after Saudi Arabia and the UK. By 2006, 3,831 Filipinos worked as nurses in Ireland, making them the largest group of foreign nurses, roughly one-fifth larger than Indians, the next largest group. Because of the high cost of obtaining a work permit, Filipino nurses earned a net of 30% less than market-rate wages (after paying for the permit) during their first year on the job.

Though workers from non-European Union countries could bring their spouses with them into Ireland, the spouses were barred from taking up employment. Filipinos, in conjunction with a variety of NGOs, began efforts to have this policy changed as early as 2002. The government altered the policy in February 2004—largely with the intent of retaining Filipino nurses, whom it was feared would otherwise migrate to other countries, such as the United Kingdom or Australia, which allowed spouses to work. However, that same year, an amendment to the constitution limited the scope of jus soli, thus excluding the children of migrant workers from automatic citizenship; the League of Filipino Nurses took its first public political position in response to the amendment, calling it "discriminatory and racist" in an 8 June 2004 statement.

In addition to nurses, roughly 2,000 Filipinos worked as caregivers in elderly care homes as of 2006; the Irish government offers training programmes enabling them to become nurses.

The Philippines opened an embassy in Dublin in July 2009, but closed it three years later. Subsequent to the embassy's closure, the Philippine government appointed Mark Congdon as Honorary Consul and Raymond Christopher Garrett as Director of Operations of the Honorary Consulate in Ireland. Following the end of Congdon's term in August 2018, there was Philippine consular representative in Ireland and all consular matters were handled by the Philippine Embassy in London. On 27 April 2019, Raymond Christopher Garrett was appointed Honorary Consul of the Republic of the Philippines for Ireland, after which he established the first dedicated Philippine Consulate office in Dublin. The office remained operational until 29 November 2024, when the Philippine Embassy in Dublin was formally reopened.

== Demographics by city and county ==
| City or town or | County | Approximate Filipino Population 2016 |
|---|---|---|
| Dublin (and Suburbs) | Dublin | 8,242 |
| Cork City (and Suburbs) | Cork | 975 |
| Limerick City (and suburbs) | Limerick | 383 |
| Galway City (and suburbs) | Galway | 454 |
| Drogheda | Louth | 265 |
| Waterford City (and suburbs) | Waterford | 152 |
| Sligo (and suburbs) | Sligo | 150 |
| Kilkenny City | Kilkenny | 173 |

== See also ==
- Ireland–Philippines relations
- Filipinos in the United Kingdom
