= Enrique Manalo =

Filipino diplomat (born 1952)

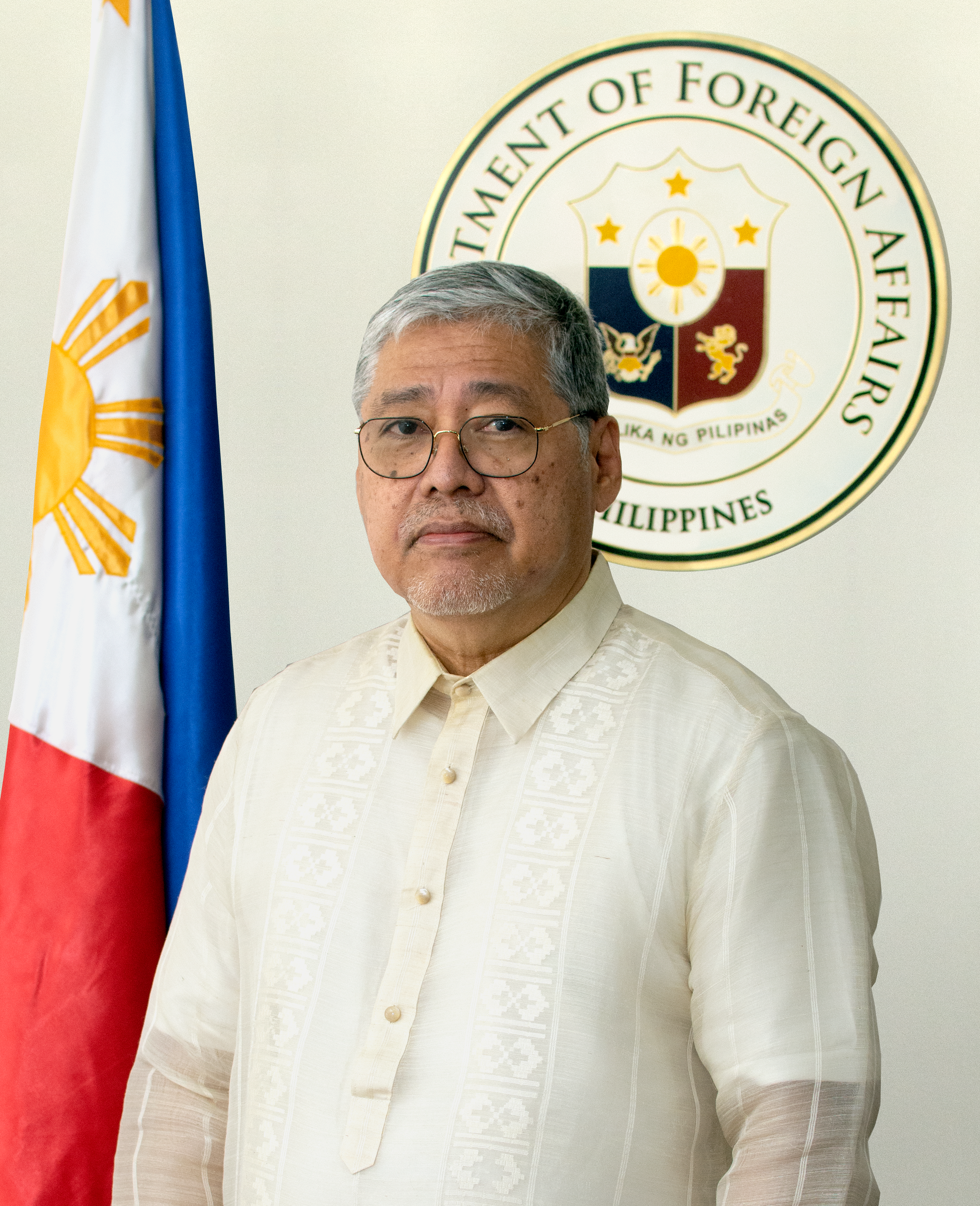
- Official portrait, 2022

22nd & 24th Permanent Representative of the Philippines to the United Nations
- Incumbent
- Assumed office September 9, 2025
- President: Bongbong Marcos
- Preceded by: Antonio Manuel Lagdameo
- In office February 28, 2020 – July 1, 2022
- President: Rodrigo Duterte
- Preceded by: Teodoro Locsin Jr.
- Succeeded by: Antonio Manuel Lagdameo

28th Secretary of Foreign Affairs
- In office July 1, 2022 – July 1, 2025
- President: Bongbong Marcos
- Preceded by: Teodoro Locsin Jr.
- Succeeded by: Tess Lazaro
- Acting; March 9, 2017 – May 17, 2017
- President: Rodrigo Duterte
- Preceded by: Perfecto Yasay Jr. (ad interim)
- Succeeded by: Alan Peter Cayetano

Undersecretary for Policy of the Department of Foreign Affairs
- In office April 30, 2016 – February 28, 2020
- President: Benigno Aquino III; Rodrigo Duterte

Ambassador of the Philippines to the United Kingdom
- In office 2011–2016
- President: Benigno Aquino III
- Preceded by: Antonio Manuel Lagdameo
- Succeeded by: Evan Garcia

Personal details
- Born: Enrique Austria Manalo; July 21, 1952 (age 74)
- Spouse: Pamela Louise Hunt
- Children: 2
- Education: University of the Philippines Diliman (BEcon, M.Ec)

Enrique Austria Manalo (born July 21, 1952) is a Filipino diplomat serving as the 21st permanent representative of the Philippines to the United Nations since 2025, a role he previously held from 2020 to 2022. He also served as the 28th secretary of foreign affairs from 2022 to 2025 and held the role in an acting capacity from March to May 2017, under the Duterte administration.

A graduate of the University of the Philippines, Manalo entered the Department of Foreign Affairs (DFA) in 1979 and served in various senior roles and ambassadorships throughout his tenure in the agency. He served as an undersecretary for policy from 2007 to 2010 and returned to the role in 2016, serving until 2020. In 2017, Manalo briefly served as the acting foreign affairs secretary after the Commission on Appointments rejected the appointment of Perfecto Yasay Jr. over citizenship issues. In 2020, President Rodrigo Duterte appointed him as the permanent representative of the Philippines to the UN, a role he would hold for the rest of Duterte's presidency.

In July 2022, President Bongbong Marcos appointed him as foreign affairs secretary. During a cabinet reshuffle in May 2025, Marcos reassigned Manalo back to his former role as permanent representative to the UN, succeeding Antonio Manuel Lagdameo.

== Life and career ==
=== 1952–1992: Early life and education ===
Manalo was born on July 21, 1952 to diplomats Armando Manalo and Jimena Austria. Manalo attended the University of the Philippines, where he obtained both a bachelor's and a master's degree in economics. He entered the Department of Foreign Affairs (DFA) in 1979. He began his career in the foreign service as the special assistant to the Office of the Deputy Minister of Foreign Affairs from 1979 to 1981. Afterward, he completed his first tour of duty at the Philippine Mission to the United Nations in Geneva, Switzerland, serving there until 1986. From 1986 to 1989, he was the first secretary and consul at the Philippine Embassy in Washington, D.C., and then served as the special assistant to the DFA's first undersecretary until 1992.

=== 1992–2016: Senior roles and ambassadorships ===
From 1992 to 1998, he was the minister counselor at the Philippine Mission to the United Nations in New York, and later served as the assistant secretary for European affairs. From 2000 to 2003, he returned to the same UN mission in New York as deputy permanent representative, with the rank of ambassador. On December 28, 2000, Manalo signed the Rome Statute, a treaty establishing the International Criminal Court, on behalf of the Philippines, although its ratification would only occur in 2011.

He then served as the permanent representative to the United Nations and other international organizations in Geneva from 2003 to 2007. Between 2005 and 2007, he also served as the elected chair of the 41st and 42nd sessions of the World Intellectual Property Organization (WIPO) General Assembly.

In 2007, Manalo was appointed DFA undersecretary for policy, serving until 2010. He was the Philippine ambassador to Belgium and Luxembourg and head of the Philippine Mission to the European Union from 2010 to 2011. He then served as the Philippine ambassador to the United Kingdom from 2011 to 2016, and concurrently as non-resident ambassador to Ireland from 2013 to 2016.

=== 2016–2022: Duterte administration ===
In April 2016, he was again appointed undersecretary for policy. From March to May 2017, he served as acting secretary of foreign affairs following the Commission on Appointments' (CA's) rejection of Perfecto Yasay Jr.'s ad interim appointment due to citizenship issues. The post was later filled by former senator Alan Peter Cayetano upon the latter's confirmation by the CA on May 17, 2017.

In August 2018, Manalo was appointed by President Rodrigo Duterte as the Philippine ambassador to Germany. In February 2020, he was appointed as the 21st permanent representative of the Philippines to the United Nations, a post left vacant since October 12, 2018, after Teodoro Locsin Jr. left the role to become the secretary of foreign affairs. Locsin had replaced Cayetano, who resigned in October 2018 to run for a congressional seat in Taguig–Pateros, which he later won. Manalo's appointment was confirmed by the CA on March 4, 2020, and he presented his credentials to UN Secretary-General António Guterres on July 27, 2020.

=== 2022–present: Marcos administration ===
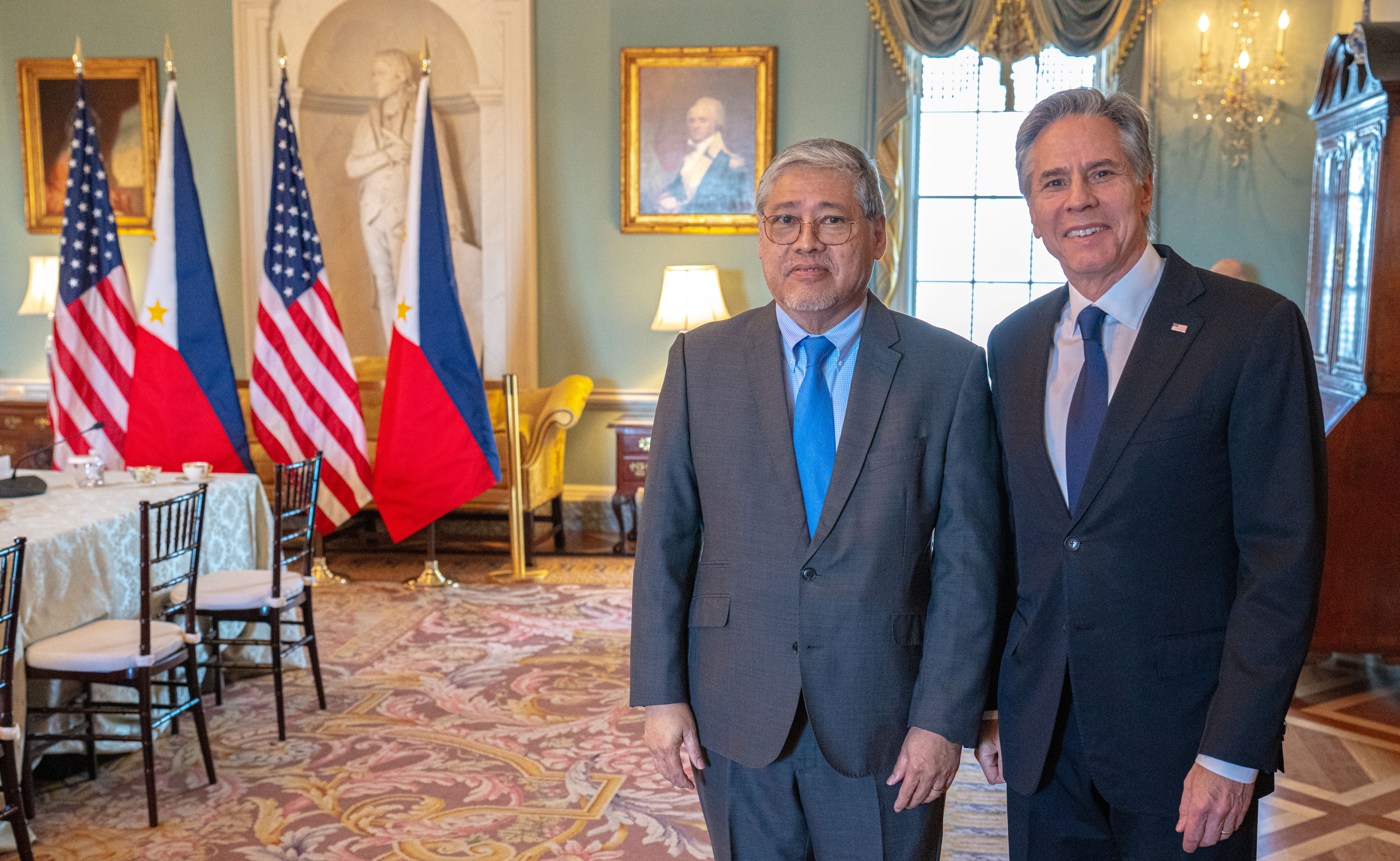
Manalo with then-United States Secretary of State Antony Blinken at the Harry S Truman Building in Washington, D.C., April 2023

In July 2022, President Bongbong Marcos appointed Manalo as secretary of foreign affairs, a role he had previously held in an acting capacity under Duterte. He was sworn in on July 1, 2022, succeeding Locsin. On the same day, he vacated his post as permanent representative to the United Nations, which was filled by Antonio M. Lagdameo, former Philippine ambassador to the United Kingdom, on July 7, 2022. Manalo's appointment as secretary of foreign affairs was confirmed by the CA's foreign affairs committee on September 28, 2022.

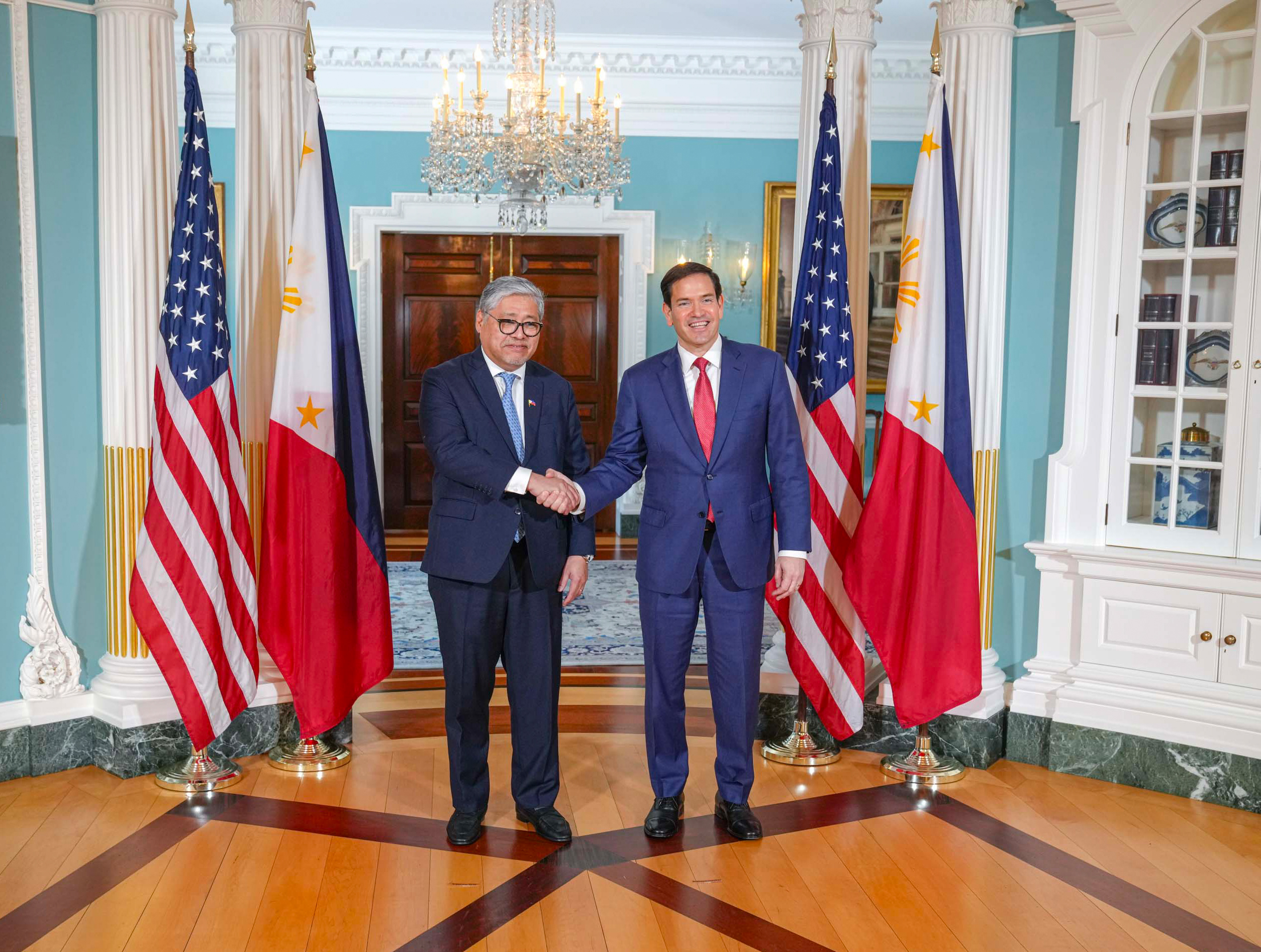
Manalo with United States Secretary of State Marco Rubio at the Harry S Truman Building in Washington, D.C., June 2025

On May 22, 2025, President Marcos ordered all members of his Cabinet to tender courtesy resignations following the May 12, 2025 midterm elections. Manalo complied with the order. His resignation was declined by President Marcos and Manalo was appointed back in his then-former post as permanent representative to the United Nations, with his appointment on the aforementioned post officially confirmed by the CA's foreign affairs committee on September 3, 2025, replacing the retiring Antonio M. Lagdameo upon assuming the post on September 9, 2025, of which he presented his credentials to UN Secretary-General António Guterres on September 20, 2025; while at the same time, Manalo was succeeded by former Philippine ambassador to France and Monaco and then-Undersecretary for Bilateral Relations and ASEAN Affairs Tess Lazaro as the secretary of foreign affairs on July 1, 2025.

== Awards and recognition ==
Honors and titles conferred on Ambassador Manalo in recognition of his exceptional and distinguished service to the Republic of the Philippines include:

- Order of Lakandula with rank of Grand Cross (Bayani) (2018)
- Order of Sikatuna with rank of Grand Cross (Datu) (Gold Distinction) (2010)
- Gawad Mabini with rank of Grand Cross (Dakilang Kamanong) (2017)

== Personal life ==
Manalo is married to Pamela Louise Hunt. They have two sons.

== See also ==
- List of foreign ministers in 2017
- List of foreign ministers in 2022

Political offices
Preceded by Perfecto Yasay, Jr. as Interim Secretary of Foreign Affairs	Secretary of Foreign Affairs; Acting; 2017	Succeeded by Alan Peter Cayetano
Preceded by Teodoro Locsin Jr.	Secretary of Foreign Affairs; 2022–2025	Succeeded by Tess Lazaro
Diplomatic posts
Preceded by Antonio M. Lagdameo	Philippine Ambassador to the United Kingdom; 2011–2016	Succeeded by Evan Garcia
Preceded by Teodoro Locsin Jr.	Permanent Representative of the Philippines to the United Nations; 2020–2022	Succeeded by Antonio M. Lagdameo
Preceded by Antonio M. Lagdameo	Permanent Representative of the Philippines to the United Nations; 2025–present	Incumbent
