= Libran N. Cabactulan =

Filipino career diplomat (born 1950)

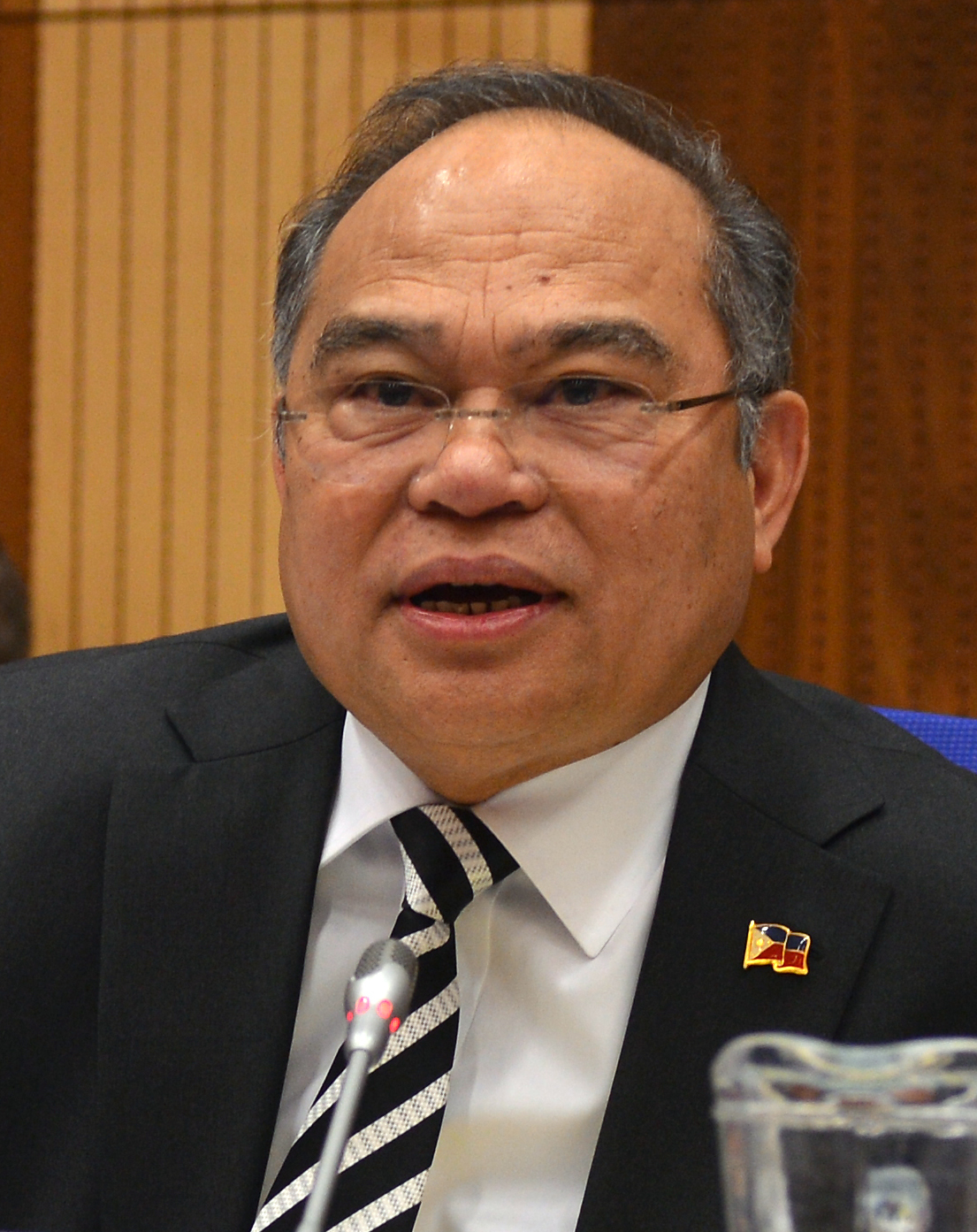
- Cabactulan in 2012

18th Permanent Representative of the Philippines to the United Nations
- In office April 29, 2010 – April 22, 2015
- President: Benigno Aquino III
- Preceded by: Hilario Davide, Jr.
- Succeeded by: Lourdes Yparraguirre

Personal details
- Born: Libran Nuevas Cabactulan; February 20, 1950 (age 76) Sagay, Camiguin, Philippines
- Education: University of the Philippines, Diliman

Libran Nuevas Cabactulan (born February 20, 1950) is a Filipino career diplomat, who served as the 18th Ambassador and Permanent Representative of the Philippines to the United Nations, replacing former Ambassador and retired Chief Justice Hilario Davide, Jr.

Prior to his appointment, he served as Assistant Secretary for Nuclear Disarmament and Non-Proliferation. Before that, he was the Philippine Ambassador to the United Arab Emirates. Libran Cabactulan also served at the Philippine Mission to the United Nations in Geneva, Switzerland; and twice at the Philippine Mission to the United Nations in New York, United States. He had also been assigned in the Philippine Embassy in Brussels, Belgium and the Philippine Consulate in Sydney, Australia.

In Manila, Libran Cabactulan served as the executive director of two department offices under the Department of Foreign Affairs. These are: (1) the Office of United Nations and Other International Organizations; and (2) the Office of Consular Affairs. He was also the Senior Special Assistant to the Secretary of Foreign Affairs.

During his diplomatic career, Libran Cabactulan led the Group of 77 developing countries and China in negotiations on economic and related issues at the General Assembly, the Economic and Social Council, the Commission on Sustainable Development, the Population Commission, United Nations Children’s Fund, and the United Nations Development Programme.

Before joining foreign service, he worked at the National Economic and Development Authority (NEDA) as a Staff Economist.

He obtained his Bachelor’s and Master’s Degrees in Political Science, and a Certificate in Development Economics from the University of the Philippines. He also has a Diploma for Commercial Policy from the General Agreement on Tariffs and Trade (GATT), the predecessor of the World Trade Organization, in Geneva.

Libran is married, and has two children.
