= Lourdes Yparraguirre =

Filipina diplomat

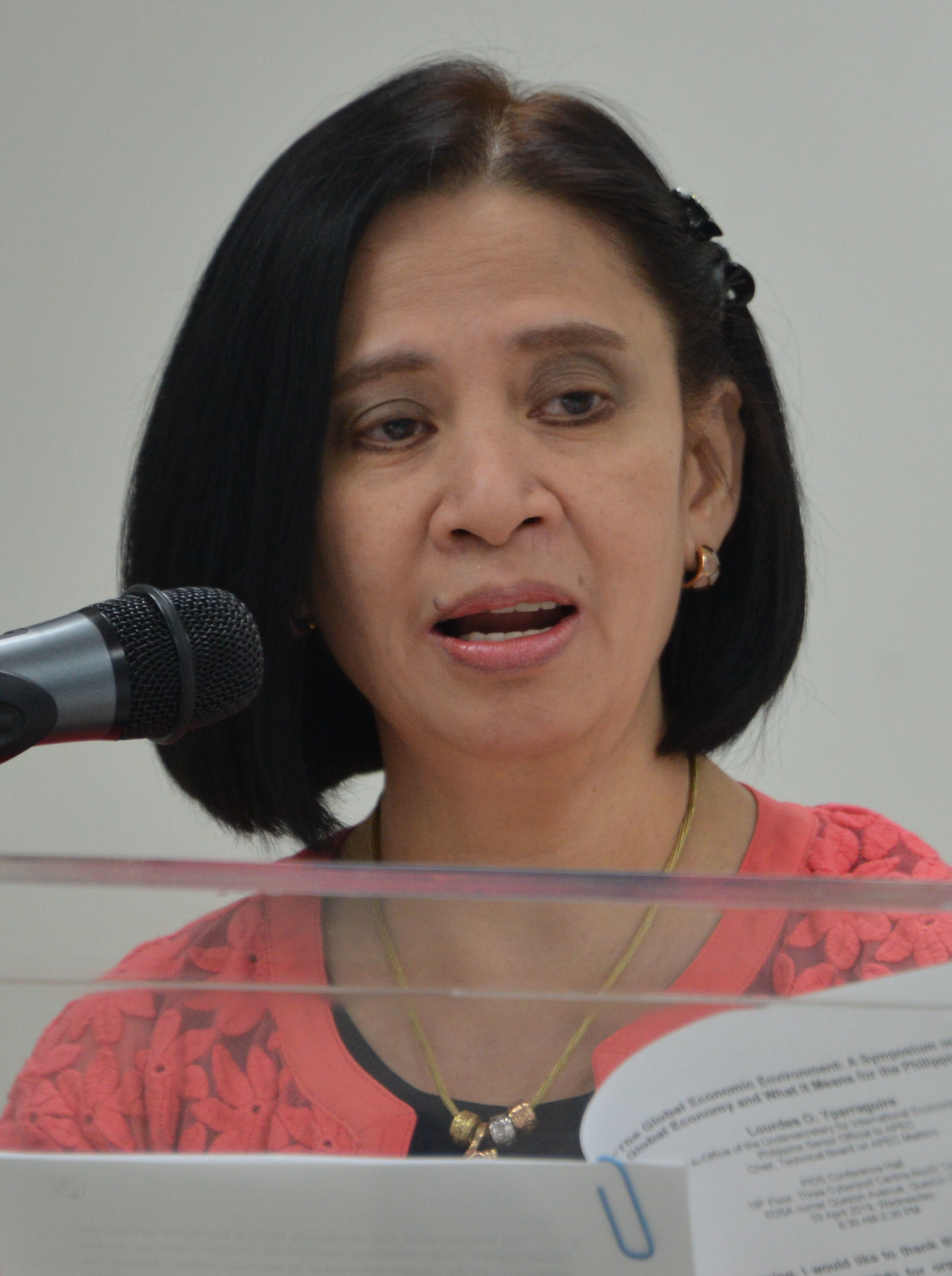

19th Permanent Representative of the Philippines to the United Nations
- In office April 22, 2015 – April 19, 2017
- President: Benigno Aquino III
- Preceded by: Libran N. Cabactulan
- Succeeded by: Teodoro Locsin Jr.

Personal details
- Occupation: Diplomat

Lourdes Ortiz Yparraguirre is a Filipina diplomat who presented her credentials to Secretary-General Ban Ki-moon on April 22, 2015 as Permanent Representative of the Philippines to the United Nations.

Yparraguirre also served as Ambassador to Austria with concurrent appointments to Croatia, Slovenia and Slovakia; Permanent Representative of the Philippines to the United Nations Office in Vienna, United Nations Industrial Development Organization (UNIDO), United Nations Office on Drugs and Crime (UNODC), Comprehensive Nuclear-Test-Ban Treaty Organization and the International Anti-Corruption Academy, as well as Resident Representative to the International Atomic Energy Agency (IAEA).

Yparraguirre earned a diploma in international economics and development from the Institute of Social Studies in The Hague, and a Bachelor of Arts degree in international studies from Maryknoll College in Quezon City, Philippines.
