= Manuel Yan =

Filipino general and diplomat (1920–2008)

Manuel Yan Sr.
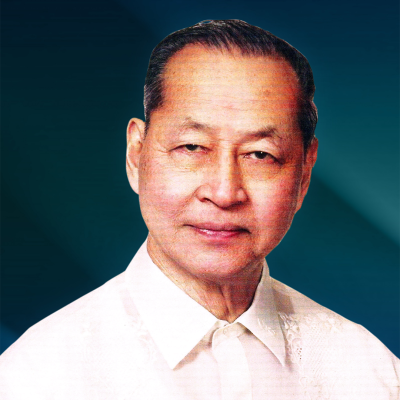

Presidential Adviser on the Peace Process
- In office 1993–2001
- President: Fidel Ramos; Joseph Estrada
- Preceded by: Oscar Santos
- Succeeded by: Eduardo Ermita

Ambassador Extraordinary and Plenipotentiary of the Republic of the Philippines to the United Kingdom
- In office 1991–1992
- President: Corazon Aquino
- Preceded by: Tomas T. Syquia
- Succeeded by: Jesus P. Tambunting

17th Secretary of Foreign Affairs of the Philippines
- In office February 2, 1987 – October 15, 1987
- President: Corazon Aquino
- Preceded by: Salvador Laurel
- Succeeded by: Raul Manglapus

Chief of Staff of the Armed Forces of the Philippines
- In office 1968–1972
- President: Ferdinand Marcos
- Preceded by: Segundo Velasco
- Succeeded by: Romeo Espino

Personal details
- Born: Manuel Tecson Yan; January 24, 1920 Santa Cruz, Manila, Philippine Islands
- Died: December 4, 2008 (aged 88) Pasig, Philippines
- Spouse(s): Amelia Acab (died 1983) Eloisa Fernandez (m. 1983; died 2008)
- Children: 5
- Relatives: Edgar Aglipay (son-in-law); Rico Yan, Bobby Yan, Michael Aglipay (grandsons)
- Education: Philippine Military Academy

Military service
- Allegiance: Philippines
- Branch/service: Philippine Army, Philippine Constabulary
- Years of service: 1937–1972
- Rank: General
- Commands: Armed Forces of the Philippines; Philippine Constabulary

Manuel Tecson Yan, Sr. (January 24, 1920 – December 4, 2008) was a Cabinet Secretary of the Aquino, Ramos and Estrada administrations, World War II veteran and Chief of Staff of the Armed Forces of the Philippines from 1968 until 1972. He was said to be the last replaced official and obstacle to Ferdinand Marcos, and whose resignation made it possible for the ex-President to declare martial law in 1972. He holds the singular Philippine Government Record of continuous longest serving public officer from April 1937 to January 2001 or a total 63 years and 9 months spanning twelve Philippine presidents.

== Military life ==
=== PMA Cadet ===
Yan entered the Philippine Military Academy (PMA) after graduating Arellano High School in 1937 and became a part of the PMA Class of 1941.

On graduation day, Manuel Yan received the Presidential Sabre. This is a symbol of superiority in both academic work and military training, from Vice President Sergio Osmeña, the commencement speaker. In finishing at the top of his class, Manuel Yan became one of the few to accomplish this feat as a high school graduate. Many young boys who join the PMA do so after one, two or even three years of college work.

=== Military service ===
He joined the Armed Forces of the Philippines in 1941. In 1942, he survived the Pantingan River Massacre, which took place during the Bataan Death March.

=== Chief of Staff of the Armed Forces of the Philippines ===
After serving as the Chief of the Philippine Constabulary, Yan was appointed by President Ferdinand Marcos as the Chief of Staff of the Armed Forces of the Philippines in May 1968. In the AFP's history, Yan (at the age of 48) was the youngest military member who had ever held this position.

However, Yan resigned his post in 1972 because he did not want to be involved with the implementation of martial law. In 1971, Yan had prominently told media that the grounds for Marcos to either impose of martial law or suspend the privilege of the writ of habeas corpus did not exist.

== Post-military service ==
Yan served the foreign service from 1972 to 1992 in various capacities as first Ambassador to Thailand up to 1981, then Ambassador to Indonesia up to 1987. After the resignation of Secretary of Foreign Affairs Salvador Laurel, he was nominated as Secretary of Foreign Affairs from February to October 1987, after which he served as Undersecretary of Foreign Affairs up to 1990 and finally as Ambassador to the United Kingdom up to 1992.

From 1992 to 1994, he was appointed GRP chairman negotiating with Moro rebels.

In 1993, President Fidel V. Ramos appointed him as the Presidential Adviser on Peace Process, a position which he retained into the presidency of Joseph Estrada; he left the position upon the overthrow of Estrada during the Second EDSA Revolution.

Among his notable achievements as the Presidential Adviser on Peace Process was engineering a peace pact with the Moro National Liberation Front, which signed the agreement with government in 1996 known as the 1996 Final Peace Agreement.

Yan was awarded (in February 2008) an honorary degree by De La Salle University, a degree of Doctor of Humanities honoris causa for being the longest serving government official, serving eleven presidents from Manuel Quezon to Joseph Estrada. He served 63 continuous years from 1937 to 2001, a record which has not been broken as of 2019.

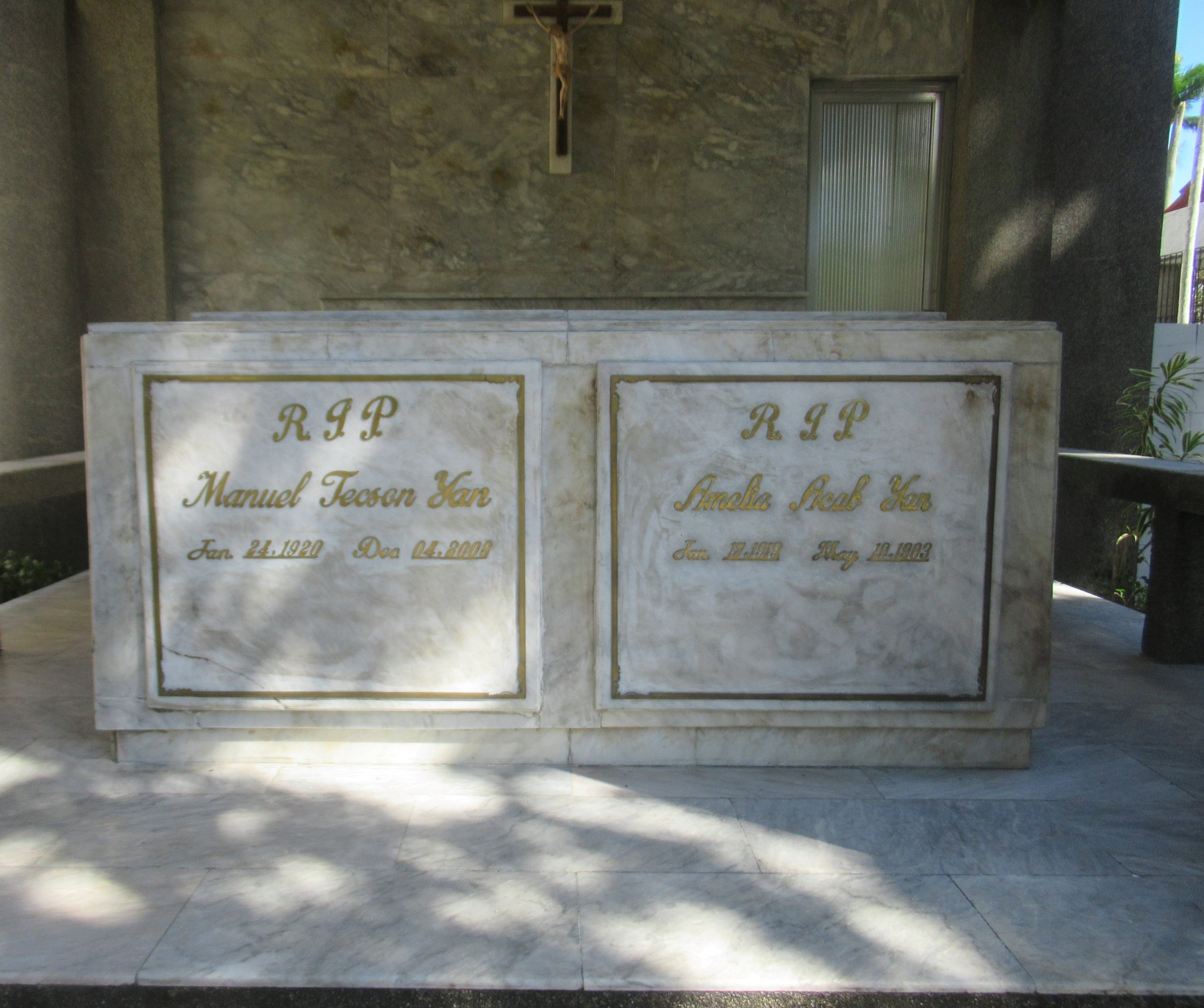
Amelia and Manuel Yan's graves at Manila Memorial Park – Sucat.

== Personal life and death ==
Yan was firstly married to Amelia Acab (1918–1983) until her death in 1983 and later remarried Eloisa Fernandez (born 1922), until her death in July 2008, before his own death five months later in December 2008. His children from his first marriage to Amelia are Manuel Jr., Beverly "Bev", Roberto "Roby" Sr., Teresita "Sita", Edgar "Egay", Marinette "Mawie", Leonardo "Leo", Mina, Joy, Raul and Lou and is the grandfather of Soclal Welfare and Development Undersecretary Emmeline Aglipay-Villar (married to Senator Mark Villar), Congressman Michael Edgar Aglipay, actor and matinee idol Rico Yan (1975–2002), and TV host and former San Juan city councillor Roberto "Bobby" Yan Jr. Yan died on December 4, 2008 at The Medical City Ortigas in Pasig.

== See also ==
- Chairman of the Joint Chiefs (Philippines)
