= Perfecto Yasay Jr. =

Filipino politician (1947–2020)

The Honorable Perfecto Yasay Jr.
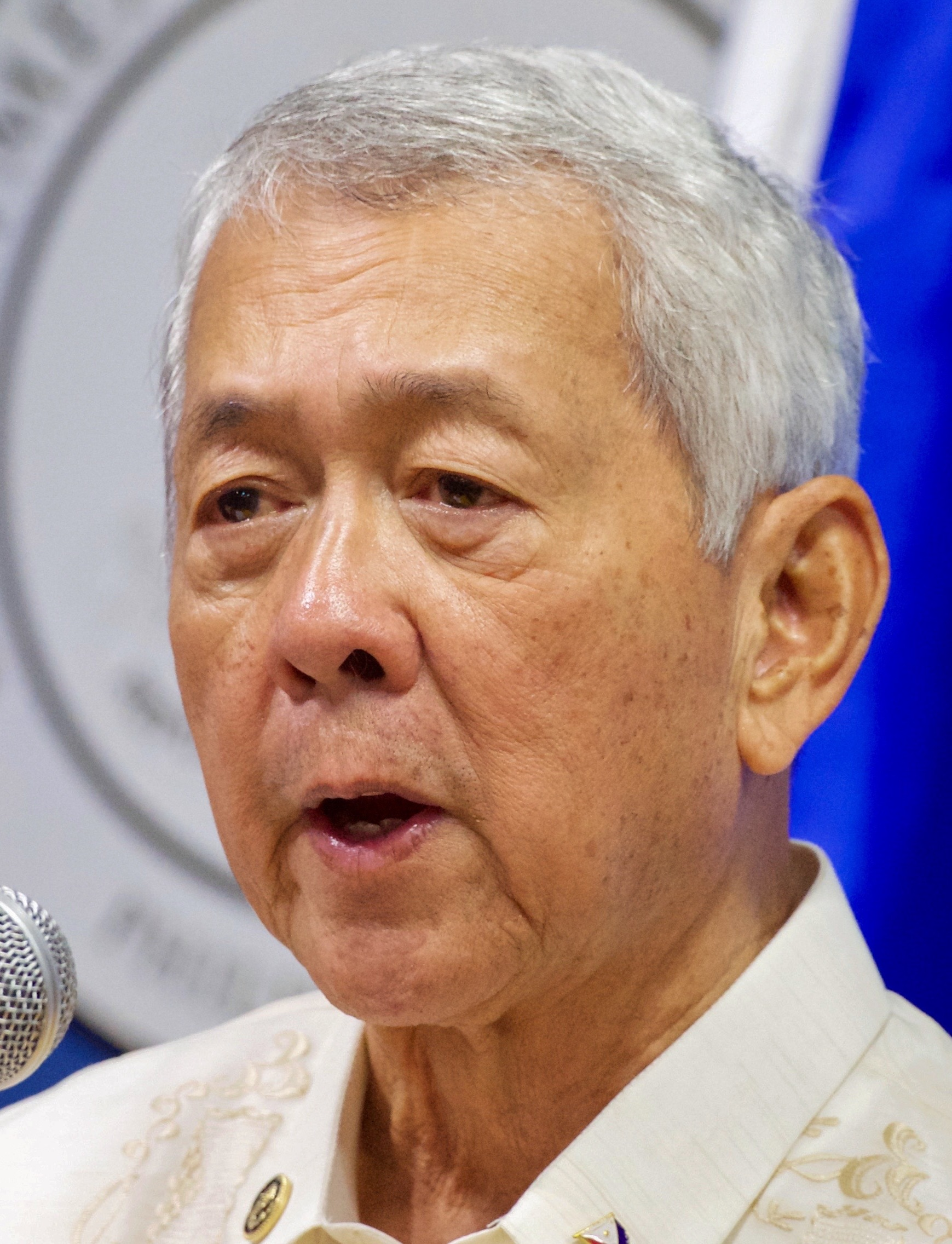

Secretary of Foreign Affairs
- Ad interim
- In office June 30, 2016 – March 8, 2017
- President: Rodrigo Duterte
- Preceded by: Jose Rene Almendras (Acting)
- Succeeded by: Enrique Manalo (Acting)

Chairman of Securities and Exchange Commission
- In office 1995–2000
- President: Fidel Ramos; Joseph Estrada
- Preceded by: Manuel G. Abello
- Succeeded by: Lilia R. Bautista

Personal details
- Born: Perfecto Rivas Yasay Jr. January 27, 1947 Kidapawan, Philippines
- Died: June 12, 2020 (aged 73) San Juan, Metro Manila, Philippines
- Resting place: Loyola Memorial Park Marikina, Philippines
- Party: Bangon (2009–2020)
- Other political affiliations: Aksyon (2004–2009); Independent (2001–2004)
- Spouse: Cecile Joaquin
- Education: Central Philippine University (BA); University of the Philippines Diliman (LL.B)

Perfecto Rivas Yasay Jr. (January 27, 1947 – June 12, 2020) was a Philippine government official who served as Secretary of Foreign Affairs of the Philippines under the Duterte administration in an ad interim basis from June 30, 2016, until March 8, 2017, the rejection of his appointment by the Commission on Appointments over eligibility concerns resulting from questions on his citizenship.

He served as chairman of the Securities and Exchange Commission (SEC) and was Bangon Pilipinas Party's vice-presidential candidate in the 2010 Philippine elections, running alongside Eddie Villanueva.

== Early life and education ==
Perfecto Yvas Yasay Jr. was born on January 27, 1947, to Perfecto Yasay Sr., a pastor, and Deborah Rivas, a public school teacher, in Kidapawan, North Cotabato (now named Cotabato). He finished his secondary education at Davao City High School in 1963 and received his Bachelor of Arts in political science at Central Philippine University, Iloilo City in 1967. He earned his law degree at the University of the Philippines Diliman.

== Career ==
=== Legal work ===
Yasay became a member of the Bar of the state of New York and of the United States Supreme Court. While in New York, he was managing director of the Maceda Philippine News from 1983 to 1987 and senior partner at two law firms—Maceda, Yasay & Tolentino, Esqs., and Yasay & De Castro, Esqs.—from 1979 to 1990. In the Philippines, he was commissioner of San Jose, Yasay & Santos Law Offices from 1987 to 1993.

=== SEC chairman ===
In 1993, he was assigned as associate commissioner of SEC. He was chairman from 1995 to 2000.

==== Estrada impeachment trial ====
Yasay was among those who testified in the impeachment trial against President Joseph Estrada on charges of corruption. The probe led to the ouster of Estrada, known as EDSA People Power II in 2001.

On February 15, 2010, Yasay apologized to Estrada for "hurting and offending him" but clarified that this was not a retraction of his testimony on the deposed president's "abuse of authority and corruption."

=== 2004 senatorial bid ===
He ran for a Senate seat in the 2004 Election under Aksyon Demokratiko but lost.

=== 2010 vice presidential bid ===
On November 29, 2009, he accepted the nomination of the Bangon Pilipinas Party to be its candidate for vice president as the running mate of Jesus is Lord Church founder and president Eddie Villanueva. Among his campaign platform points, Yasay conveyed that the practice of using big-name endorsers should be stopped because it makes the elections a matter of money and popularity. He also said that the voters will only base their votes via the endorsers of the candidate, and that the biggest setback in the fight against corruption was the quick pardon of Joseph Estrada. Yasay lost to Makati City Mayor Jejomar Binay in the vice-presidential elections.

=== Secretary of Foreign Affairs ===
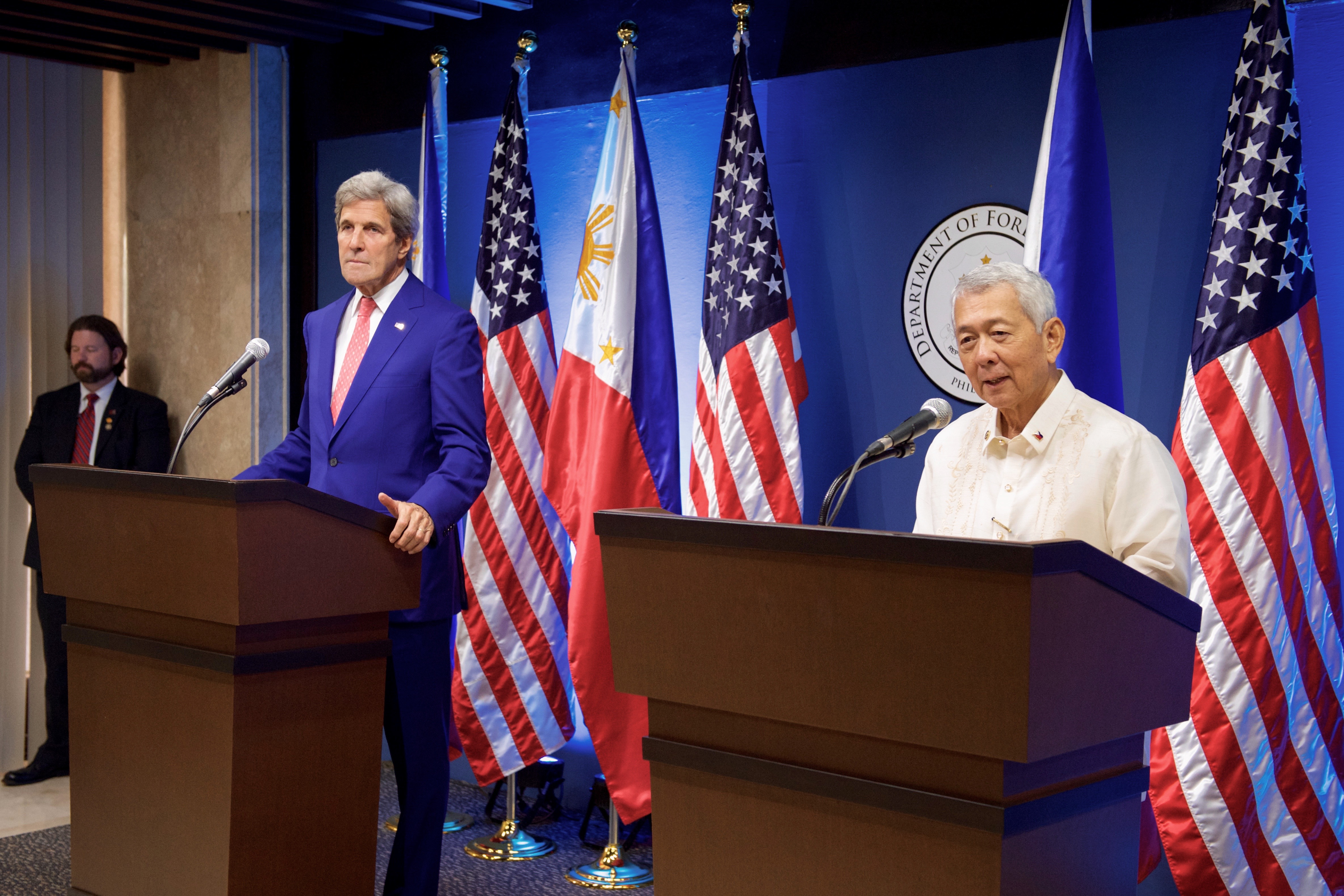
Yasay with U.S. Secretary of State John Kerry during their bilateral meeting on July 27, 2016

He accepted the offer of President Rodrigo Duterte to join his Cabinet on May 18, 2016. During his tenure he represented the Duterte administration's policy of an "independent foreign policy" distancing the Philippines from the United States. According to Yasay, the United States had used a "carrot and stick" foreign policy in regard to the Philippines since for their own interest to the detriment of the latter. Yasay was meant by Duterte to serve the post until mid-2017, when Duterte planned to appoint his running mate, Senator Alan Peter Cayetano, as his successor. On March 8, 2017, however, Yasay's appointment was rejected by a unanimous vote of 15–0 by the Commission on Appointments due to questions about his Philippine citizenship status after a period of United States citizenship.

== Board memberships and philanthropy ==
He was chairman of the Board of Trustees of Philippine Christian University and Central Philippine University.

== Death ==
Yasay died on June 12, 2020, in San Juan, Metro Manila, due to complications from pneumonia according to his wife. His wife clarified, however, that his pneumonia was a complication from cancer recurrence rather than COVID-19, the latter disease being the cause of a pandemic affecting the world at the time of Yasay's death.

== Personal life ==
He was married to former Population Commission executive director Cecile Joaquin and had three children, all United States citizens. He had American citizenship until 2016, but had yet to retake the Philippine oath of citizenship; there was debate whether he was stateless or not.

== See also ==
- List of foreign ministers in 2017

Political offices
Preceded by Manuel G. Abello	Chairman of Securities and Exchange Commission; 1995–2000	Succeeded by Lilia R. Bautista
Preceded by Jose Rene Almendras as Acting Secretary for Foreign Affairs	Secretary of Foreign Affairs; Ad interim 2016–2017	Succeeded by Enrique Manalo as Acting Secretary for Foreign Affairs
