= Teodoro Locsin Jr. =

Filipino politician

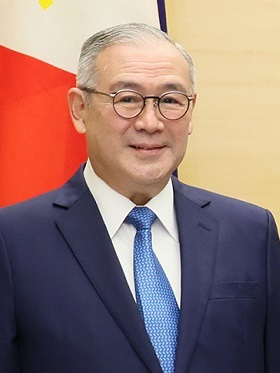
- Locsin at Kantei in 2022

Ambassador of the Philippines to the United Kingdom
- Incumbent
- Assumed office August 30, 2022
- President: Bongbong Marcos
- Preceded by: Antonio M. Lagdameo

27th Secretary of Foreign Affairs
- In office October 17, 2018 – June 30, 2022
- President: Rodrigo Duterte
- Preceded by: Alan Peter Cayetano
- Succeeded by: Enrique Manalo

20th Permanent Representative of the Philippines to the United Nations
- In office April 19, 2017 – October 12, 2018
- President: Rodrigo Duterte
- Preceded by: Lourdes Yparraguirre
- Succeeded by: Enrique Manalo

Member of the Philippine House of Representatives from Makati's 1st district
- In office June 30, 2001 – June 30, 2010
- Preceded by: Joker Arroyo
- Succeeded by: Monique Lagdameo

Press Secretary
- In office March 26, 1986 – September 14, 1987
- President: Corazon Aquino
- Preceded by: Alice C. Villadolid
- Succeeded by: Teodoro C. Benigno, Jr.

Personal details
- Born: Teodoro Lopez Locsin, Jr. November 16, 1948 (age 77) Manila, Philippines
- Party: PDP–Laban
- Education: Ateneo de Manila University (LL.B); Harvard University (LL.M)
- Occupation: Businessman, journalist, ambassador
- Profession: Lawyer, politician, diplomat

Teodoro "Teddy Boy" Lopez Locsin Jr. GOLH (born November 16, 1948) is a Filipino politician, diplomat, lawyer, and former journalist who is currently serving as the Philippine Ambassador to the United Kingdom since August 30, 2022. He previously served as the Secretary of Foreign Affairs under the Duterte administration from 2018 to 2022. He was a member of the House of Representatives from 2001 to 2010, representing the 1st district of Makati and later served as the Philippine ambassador to the United Nations from 2017 to 2018. He was the host of the editorial segment titled "Teditorial" for ANC's nightly newscast The World Tonight.

== Early life and education ==
Locsin was born in Manila on November 15, 1948. His father was the prominent newspaperman and publisher Teodoro Locsin Sr. from the Negrense branch of the Locsin family of Molo, Iloilo. He studied at the Ateneo de Manila University and received a bachelor's degree in law and jurisprudence. He also earned a Master of Laws degree from Harvard University.

== Supreme Court nominations ==
When Senior Associate Justice Leonardo Quisumbing retired from the Supreme Court in 2009, Locsin was among the candidates nominated by the Judicial and Bar Council as a potential replacement. However, he was not appointed to the said post. In 2012, he was nominated as chief justice to replace Renato Corona but the post eventually went to Associate Justice Maria Lourdes Sereno.

== United Nations ==
Locsin was designated as the Philippines' 20th Permanent Representative of the Philippines to the United Nations by President Rodrigo Duterte in 2017. It was announced that he accepted the appointment on September 18, 2016. His term officially began when he presented his credentials to the Secretary-General of the United Nations António Guterres, on April 19, 2017.

Under his leadership, the Philippines voted to abstain from the challenge against the legality of the Independent Expert on SOGI (sexual orientation and gender identity) at a November 2016 session.

Also, the Philippines was among 10 nations that voted against a UN resolution urging Myanmar to end its military campaign against Rohingya Muslims living in the Rakhine state in November 2017.

Additionally, the country was one of 35 nations to abstain on the UN vote to declare the US recognition of Jerusalem as Israel's capital null and void during an emergency December 2017 session of the UN General Assembly.

In March 2018, Locsin submitted the country's letter of withdrawal from the Rome Statute, the treaty that established the ICC, after President Duterte expressed his intent to withdraw from the court. Locsin vacated the post of permanent representative of the Philippines to the United Nations on October 12, 2018, upon assuming the post of Foreign Affairs Secretary, with the former post being filled up by his successor, Enrique Manalo.

== Foreign Affairs Secretary ==
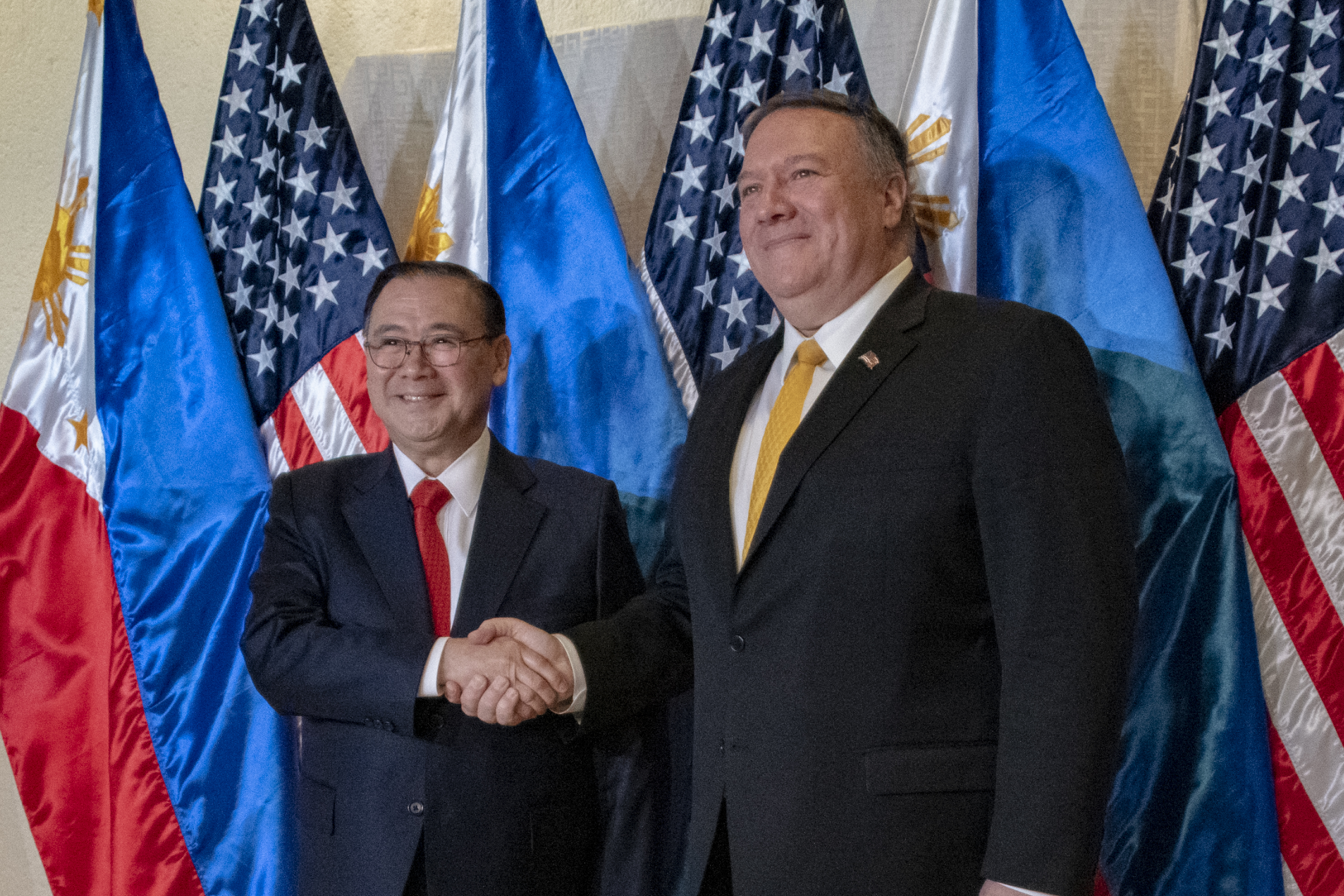
Locsin (left) with United States Secretary of State Mike Pompeo in February 2019

On October 11, 2018, Locsin announced that President Rodrigo Duterte offered him the post of Secretary of Foreign Affairs, which was held by Alan Peter Cayetano. Cayetano intended to run in the May 2019 elections for representative of Taguig–Pateros, effectively vacating the position.

Locsin was sworn in by Duterte as secretary of Foreign Affairs on October 17, 2018. His appointment confirmed by the Commission on Appointments on November 28, 2018.

== Ambassador to the United Kingdom ==
On August 30, 2022, President Bongbong Marcos nominated Locsin to be the next Philippine Ambassador to the United Kingdom, of which the position has been left vacant since July 7, 2022 after Antonio M. Lagdameo was appointed as the Permanent Representative of the Philippines to the United Nations by President Marcos on July 7, 2022.

Then-press secretary Trixie Cruz-Angeles announced Locsin's appointment on the aforementioned post on September 4, 2022, with his appointment being subsequently confirmed by the Commission on Appointments on December 7, 2022. Later, Locsin has presented his credentials on May 16, 2023, to King Charles III.

Amidst recent maritime confrontations with China due to territorial disputes in the South China Sea, President Marcos appointed Locsin on August 16, 2023, as concurrent Special Envoy of the President to the People’s Republic of China for Special Concerns.

== Personal life ==
=== Relationships ===
Locsin is married to Ma. Lourdes Barcelon, a 2010 candidate for representative of the 1st district of Makati who lost in a tight race to outgoing Councilor Monique Lagdameo of PDP–Laban.

He was formerly married to Philippine Stock Exchange director Vivian Yuchengco. They have two daughters, Margarita and Bianca.

== Career history ==
- Philippine Ambassador to the United Kingdom (2022–present)
- Secretary of Foreign Affairs (2018–2022)
- Philippine Ambassador to the United Nations (2017–2018)
- Law Professor at San Beda University (2015–2017)
- Host of #NoFilter on ANC (2016)
- Radio anchor of Executive Session on DZRH (2014– Present)
- Segment anchor of The World Tonight's TEDitorial (2011–2017)
- Former host of Assignment on ABS-CBN (1995–2001)
- Publisher and editor-in-chief of Today Newspaper (1993–2005)
- Executive director of Philippine Free Press magazine (1993–2013)
- Publisher of The Daily Globe newspaper (1988–1993)
- Presidential speechwriter of Office of the President (1985–1992)
- Presidential spokesperson, legal counsel and speechwriter, office of Pres. Corazon Aquino of Ministry of Information, Malacañang (1986–1988)
- Locsin was known as the speechwriter of Corazon Aquino, and penned her standing ovation speech at the US Congress (1986)
- Lecturer of US War College (1991)
- Press Secretary (1986–1987)
- Executive assistant to the chairman of Ayala Corporation and Bank of the Philippine Islands (1982–1985)
- Associate of Angara, Abello, Concepcion, Regala and Cruz Law offices (1977–1982)
- Editorial writer of Philippine Free Press (1967–1972)

== Political and societal positions ==
Locsin has found himself at the center of various controversial public statements via the social media platform Twitter.

=== Filipino language ===
In March 2016, during the Visayas leg of the PiliPinas Debates 2016, he opined in a tweet that the Tagalog language was "inappropriate to pointed debate" describing it as "so long, so bullshitty, so useless". Conversely, he described English as "the civilized language" and "the language of men". He later defended his comments, saying "show me that [Tagalog] is a good language. That it is effective in debate, that it can get its point across". He did however praise Luchi Cruz-Valdes for effectively moderating the debate in Tagalog: "she got the point across. In spite of the terrible situation, she was in control, and she did it in Tagalog."

=== Philippine drug war ===
Locsin expressed support for the Philippine drug war on August 21, 2017, through Twitter, comparing the campaign against drugs of President Duterte to Adolf Hitler's Final Solution and said he does not believe in the rehabilitation of drug addicts. He followed this with another remark that the "Nazis were not all wrong" and said people should keep an open mind drawing criticism. He cited Hitler's military and economic policies that "are paying off even now in German primacy in Europe" but conceded that the Holocaust "wiped out his economic contribution." Locsin later retracted these remarks by deleting the tweet, however threatened individuals who criticized him.

=== Rape as a heinous crime ===
On February 20, 2017, the majority bloc members of the House of Representatives caucused to remove rape from the list of possible death penalty offenses. When the official Twitter account of the ABS-CBN News Channel reported this, Locsin tweeted a reply.

Locsin in a tweet said that while rape is a crime; an "indignity" and "outrage" it is not a heinous crime. Though he went on to mention select cases of rape as "heinous" such as a gang rape in India and an incident where the rapist is an ugly man. He then said that killing is not heinous or premeditated saying it's a common crime. His posts were criticized by some users of Twitter.

=== Philippine Rise ===
On February 14, 2018, Locsin tweeted that criticizers of the Chinese names imposed by China on the Philippine Rise, which have been recognized by the International Hydrographic Organization, are 'childish and stupid', sparking a word war on the issue. Criticizers noted that Locsin is the current ambassador to the United Nations and should be one of the first to defend the Philippines' sovereignty and sovereign rights. Locsin did not reply afterwards.

=== Sabah ===
The Philippines has an unresolved claim to much of eastern Sabah.

On July 27, 2020, a tweet by the Embassy of the United States to the Philippines regarding the donation of hygiene kits by Filipino expatriates from Sabah indicated that Sabah belongs to Malaysia. Locsin quoted the tweet and replied that "Sabah is not in Malaysia". In response, on July 29, the foreign minister of Malaysia, Hishammuddin Hussein, called Locsin's remarks irresponsible and damaging to bilateral ties, and summoned the Philippine ambassador to Malaysia, Charles Jose. In response, on July 30, Locsin also summoned the Malaysian ambassador to the Philippines, Norman Muhamad.

=== Support of gasoline as a disinfectant ===
On August 1, 2020, Locsin responded to a tweet by radio personality Mo Twister criticizing President Duterte's suggestion of using gasoline as a disinfectant for face masks in the COVID-19 pandemic. Locsin asked Mo Twister "...what if [Duterte]'s right? Seriously, bro." He added that he knew of people in small towns who used to kill head lice by dropping them into kerosene.

=== 2023 Israel–Gaza war ===
In October 2023, amidst the Gaza war, in response to a tweet about Palestinian stone-throwing, Locsin tweeted "That's why Palestinian children should be killed; they might grow up to be gullible ... letting Hamas launch rockets at Israel." After drawing criticism, he deleted the tweet and apologized, explaining he "was not advocating for the literal death of anyone, but rather simply for the end of any ideology that condones terrorism." The Department of Foreign Affairs disassociated themselves from Locsin's comments, saying it was his personal opinion.

One Bangsamoro Movement Inc., a Muslim civic group, filed a disbarment case against Locsin at the Supreme Court.

== See also ==
- List of foreign ministers in 2018
- Secretary of Foreign Affairs (Philippines)

House of Representatives of the Philippines
Preceded by Joker Arroyo	Member of the Philippine House of Representatives from Makati's 1st district 2001–2010	Succeeded by Monique Lagdameo
Political offices
Preceded by Alice C. Villadolid	Press Secretary; 1986–1987	Succeeded by Teodoro C. Benigno Jr.
Preceded by Alan Peter Cayetano	Secretary of Foreign Affairs; 2018–2022	Succeeded by Enrique Manalo
Diplomatic posts
Preceded by Lourdes Yparraguirre	Permanent Representative of the Philippines to the United Nations; 2017–2018	Succeeded by Enrique Manalo
Preceded by Antonio M. Lagdameo	Philippine Ambassador to the United Kingdom; 2022–present	Incumbent
