= Permanent Representative of the Philippines to the United Nations =

Ambassador

Permanent Representative of the Philippines to the United Nations Sugo at Palagiang Kinatawan ng Pilipinas sa mga Nagkakaisang Bansa
- Seal of the Department of Foreign Affairs

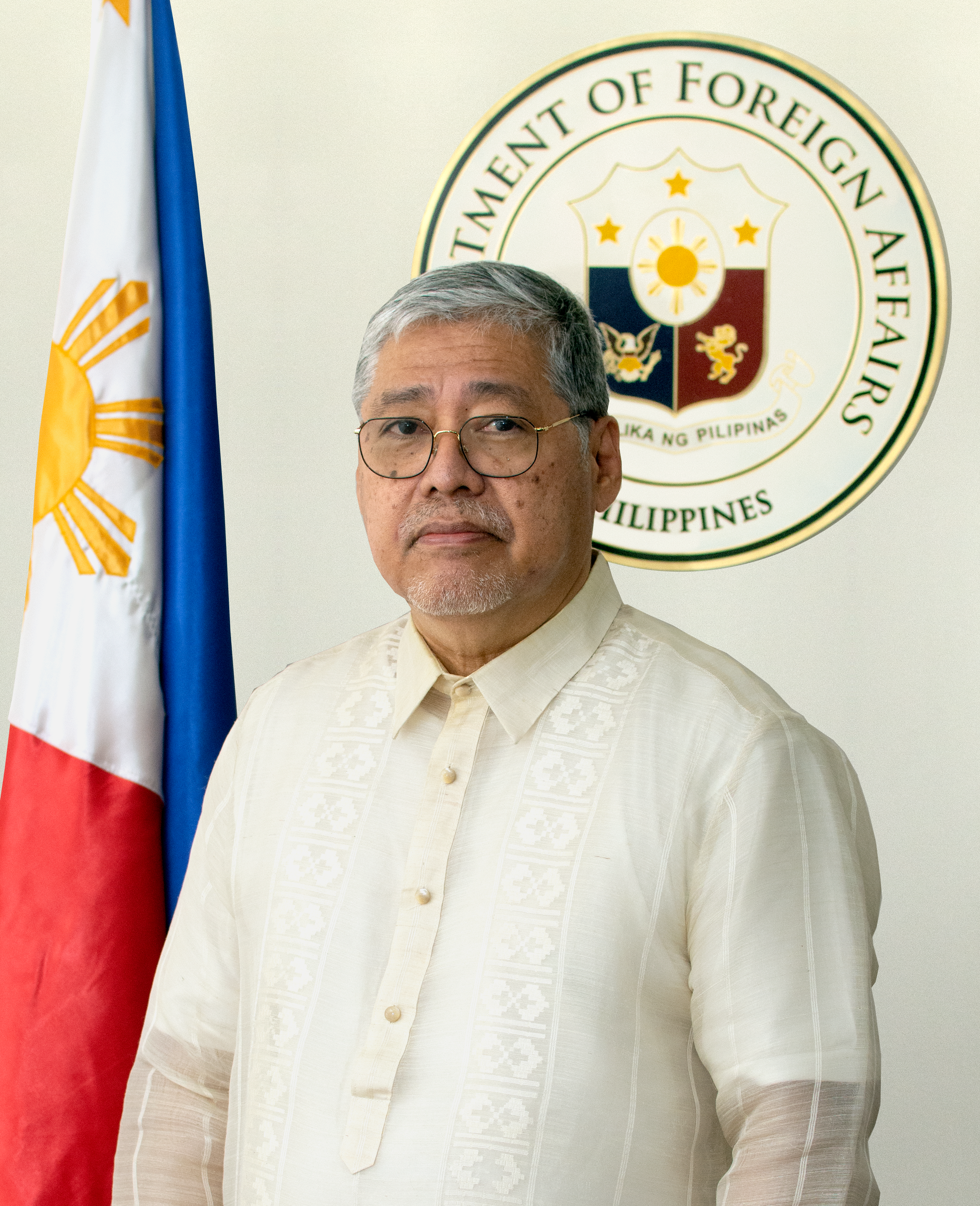
- Incumbent; Enrique Manalo since September 9, 2025
- Department of Foreign Affairs
- Style: Mr. Ambassador (informal); His Excellency (diplomatic)
- Reports to: President of the Philippines; Secretary of Foreign Affairs
- Term length: No fixed term
- Inaugural holder: Carlos P. Romulo
- Formation: 1946; 80 years ago

The ambassador and permanent representative of the Philippines to the United Nations (Filipino: Sugo at Palagiang Kinatawan ng Pilipinas sa mga Nagkakaisang Bansa) is the head of the diplomatic mission of the government of the Philippines to the United Nations.

== List of permanent representatives ==
#	Ambassador	Years served	U.N. Secretary-General	Philippine President
1	Carlos P. Romulo	1946–1948	(Norway) Trygve Lie	Manuel Roxas
1	Carlos P. Romulo	1948–1952	(Norway) Trygve Lie	Elpidio Quirino
1	Carlos P. Romulo	1952–1953	(Norway) Trygve Lie	Elpidio Quirino
1	Carlos P. Romulo	1952–1953	(Sweden) Dag Hammarskjöld	Elpidio Quirino
1	Carlos P. Romulo	1952–1953	(Sweden) Dag Hammarskjöld	Ramon Magsaysay
2	Felixberto Serrano	1954–1957	(Sweden) Dag Hammarskjöld	Ramon Magsaysay
3	Francisco Delgado	1958–1961	(Sweden) Dag Hammarskjöld	Carlos P. Garcia
3	Francisco Delgado	1961	(Myanmar) U Thant	Carlos P. Garcia
4	Jacinto Borja	1962–1964	(Myanmar) U Thant	Diosdado Macapagal
5	Salvador Lopez	1964–1965	(Myanmar) U Thant	Diosdado Macapagal
5	Salvador Lopez	1965–1969	(Myanmar) U Thant	Ferdinand Marcos
6	Narciso Reyes	1970–1971	(Myanmar) U Thant	Ferdinand Marcos
6	Narciso Reyes	1971–1977	(Austria) Kurt Waldheim	Ferdinand Marcos
7	Alejandro Yango	1979–1981	(Austria) Kurt Waldheim	Ferdinand Marcos
7	Alejandro Yango	1981–1982	(Peru) Javier Pérez de Cuéllar	Ferdinand Marcos
8	Luis Moreno-Salcedo	1982–1985	(Peru) Javier Pérez de Cuéllar	Ferdinand Marcos
9	Salvador Lopez	1986–1987	(Peru) Javier Pérez de Cuéllar	Corazon Aquino
10	Emmanuel Pelaez	1987–1988	(Peru) Javier Pérez de Cuéllar	Corazon Aquino
11	Claudio Teehankee	1988–1989	(Peru) Javier Pérez de Cuéllar	Corazon Aquino
12	Sedfrey Ordoñez	1990–1991	(Peru) Javier Pérez de Cuéllar	Corazon Aquino
12	Sedfrey Ordoñez	1991–1992	(Egypt) Boutros Boutros-Ghali	Corazon Aquino
13	Narcisa L. Escaler	1992–1994	(Egypt) Boutros Boutros-Ghali	Fidel V. Ramos
14	Felipe Mabilangan	1994–1996	(Egypt) Boutros Boutros-Ghali	Fidel V. Ramos
14	Felipe Mabilangan	1997–1998	(Ghana) Kofi Annan	Fidel V. Ramos
14	Felipe Mabilangan	1998–2001	(Ghana) Kofi Annan	Joseph Ejercito Estrada
15	Alfonso Yuchengco	2001–2002	(Ghana) Kofi Annan	Gloria Macapagal Arroyo
16	Lauro Baja, Jr.	2003–2006	(Ghana) Kofi Annan	Gloria Macapagal Arroyo
16	Lauro Baja, Jr.	2006–2007	(South Korea) Ban Ki-moon	Gloria Macapagal Arroyo
17	Hilario Davide, Jr.	2007–2010	(South Korea) Ban Ki-moon	Gloria Macapagal Arroyo
18	Libran N. Cabactulan	2010	(South Korea) Ban Ki-moon	Gloria Macapagal Arroyo
18	Libran N. Cabactulan	2010–2015	(South Korea) Ban Ki-moon	Benigno S. Aquino III
19	Lourdes O. Yparraguirre	2015–2017	(South Korea) Ban Ki-moon	Benigno S. Aquino III
20	Teodoro Locsin Jr.	2017–2018	(South Korea) Ban Ki-moon	Rodrigo Duterte
20	Teodoro Locsin Jr.	2017–2018	(Portugal) António Guterres	Rodrigo Duterte
21	Rodolfo D. Robles	2018–2020	(Portugal) António Guterres	Rodrigo Duterte
22	Enrique Manalo	2020–2022	(Portugal) António Guterres	Rodrigo Duterte
23	Antonio M. Lagdameo	2022–2025	(Portugal) António Guterres	Bongbong Marcos
24	Enrique Manalo	2025–present	(Portugal) António Guterres	Bongbong Marcos

== See also ==
- Filipinos in the New York metropolitan area
