= Ireland–Philippines relations =

- Ireland: Philippines

Ireland–Philippines relations are the bilateral relations between Ireland and the Philippines. Ireland has an embassy in Manila, and the Philippines has an embassy in Dublin.

== History ==
Until comparatively recent times the story of Ireland–Philippines relations was that of a flow of Irish Catholic missionaries to the Philippines. Irish Catholic orders such as the Sisters of Charity founded houses in the Philippines as early as 1862. The Maynooth mission to China was extended to the Philippines in 1929.

In 1984, the two countries established formal diplomatic relations. In the 1980s, the Government of Ireland made representations to the Government of the Philippines concerning the welfare of missionaries in the Philippines. Due to the presence of a strong common dominant faith, the Catholic faith, the Philippines has been described as “a sort of Catholic Ireland located off the coastline of Asia". A strong cultural link between the two countries is that many people in the Philippines have been educated by Irish missionaries. Irish missionary and charitable organisations such as Trócaire were involved in opposition to the First Marcos regime in the Philippines.

== Diplomatic missions ==
The Philippines is represented in Ireland by Antonio M. Lagdameo, non-resident Ambassador of the Philippines, who presented his credentials to President Michael D. Higgins on 19 April 2018.

On 30 May 2009, President Gloria Macapagal Arroyo swore in Ariel Abadilla, as the Philippine's first full-time resident ambassador to Ireland.

Ambassador Abadilla presented his letter of credence on 29 June 2009 to the President of Ireland, Mary McAleese at a ceremony held at the State Reception Room of Áras an Uachtaráin in Phoenix Park, Dublin.

On 16 July 2012, the Philippine embassy in Ireland was closed and in October 2012 an Honorary Consul was appointed. In November 2021, Ireland reopened its embassy in Manila.

== See also ==
- Foreign relations of Ireland
- Foreign relations of the Philippines
