= Secretary of Foreign Affairs (Philippines) =

Cabinet member

- Kalihim ng Ugnayang Panlabas
- Seal of the Department of Foreign Affairs

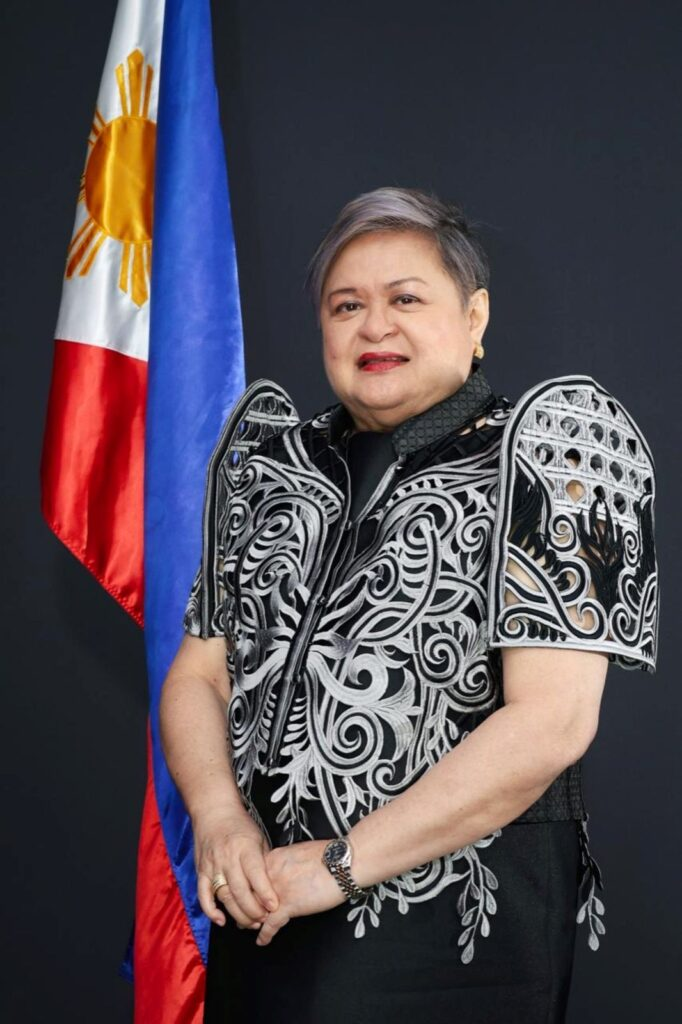
- Incumbent; Tess Lazaro since July 1, 2025
- Department of Foreign Affairs
- Style: Madam Secretary (informal); The Honorable (formal); Her Excellency (diplomatic)
- Member of: Cabinet; National Security Council
- Reports to: President of the Philippines
- Seat: Pasay
- Appointer: President of the Philippines with Commission on Appointments advice and consent
- Term length: At the president's pleasure
- Inaugural holder: Apolinario Mabini
- Formation: January 21, 1899
- Website: www.dfa.gov.ph

The secretary of foreign affairs (Filipino: Kalihim ng Ugnayang Panlabas) is the Cabinet of the Philippines member in charge of implementing foreign policy for the government of the Philippines as the head of the Department of Foreign Affairs.

The incumbent secretary is Tess Lazaro, who has served since July 1, 2025.

== Duties and powers ==
Under the basis of Commonwealth Act No. 732, Republic Act No. 708, and Republic Act No. 7157, the duties and powers of the Secretary is: "advises and assists the President in planning, organizing, directing, coordinating, integrating, and evaluating the total national effort in the field of foreign affairs relations in pursuit of its Constitutional mandate".

== List of secretaries of foreign affairs ==
=== Secretary of Foreign Relations (1899) ===
| Portrait | Name (Birth–Death) | Took office | Left office | President |
|---|---|---|---|---|
| | Apolinario Mabini (1864–1903) | January 21, 1899 | May 7, 1899 | Emilio Aguinaldo |
| | Felipe Buencamino (1848–1929) | May 7, 1899 | November 13, 1899 | Emilio Aguinaldo |

=== Minister of Foreign Affairs (1943–1945) ===
| Portrait | Name (Birth–Death) | Took office | Left office | President |
|---|---|---|---|---|
| | Claro M. Recto (1890–1960) | October 19, 1943 | March 12, 1945 | Jose P. Laurel |

=== Secretary of Foreign Affairs (1946–1978) ===
| Portrait | Name (Birth–Death) | Took office | Left office | President |
|---|---|---|---|---|
| | Elpidio Quirino (Note: In concurrent capacity as the Vice President until April 17, 1948, and as the President from April 17, 1948.) (1890–1956) | July 5, 1946 | January 6, 1950 | Manuel Roxas |
| | Elpidio Quirino (1890–1956) | July 5, 1946 | January 6, 1950 | Elpidio Quirino |
| | Felino Neri | January 6, 1950 | May 11, 1950 | Elpidio Quirino |
| | Carlos P. Romulo (1899–1985) | May 11, 1950 | January; 1952 | Elpidio Quirino |
| | Joaquín Miguel Elizalde (1896–1965) | April 18, 1952 | December 30, 1953 | Elpidio Quirino |
| | Carlos P. Garcia (Note: In concurrent capacity as the Vice President until March 18, 1957, and as the President from March 18, 1957.) (1896–1971) | December 30, 1953 | August 22, 1957 | Ramon Magsaysay |
| | Carlos P. Garcia (1896–1971) | December 30, 1953 | August 22, 1957 | Carlos P. Garcia |
| | Felixberto Serrano (1906–1990) | August 22, 1957 | December 30, 1961 | Carlos P. Garcia |
| | Emmanuel Pelaez (Note: In concurrent capacity as the Vice President.) (1915–2003) | December 30, 1961 | July; 1963 | Diosdado Macapagal |
| | Salvador P. Lopez (1911–1993) | July; 1963 | May 9, 1964 | Diosdado Macapagal |
| | Mauro Mendez | May 9, 1964 | December 30, 1965 | Diosdado Macapagal |
| | Narciso Ramos (1900–1986) | December 30, 1965 | November 30, 1968 | Ferdinand Marcos |
| | Carlos P. Romulo (1899–1985) | November 30, 1968 | June 2, 1978 | Ferdinand Marcos |

=== Minister of Foreign Affairs (1978–1987) ===
President Ferdinand Marcos issued Presidential Decree No. 1397 on June 2, 1978, converting all departments into ministries headed by ministers.

| Portrait | Name (Birth–Death) | Took office | Left office | President |
|---|---|---|---|---|
| | Carlos P. Romulo (1899–1985) | June 2, 1978 | January 14, 1984 | Ferdinand Marcos |
| | Manuel Collantes (1917–2009); Acting | January 14, 1984 | June 30, 1984 | Ferdinand Marcos |
| | Arturo Tolentino (1910–2004) | June 30, 1984 | March 4, 1985 | Ferdinand Marcos |
| | Pacifico Castro (1932–2001); Acting | March 4, 1985 | February 25, 1986 | Ferdinand Marcos |
| | Salvador Laurel (1928–2004) | February 25, 1986 | February 2, 1987 | Corazon Aquino |
| | Manuel Yan (1920–2008) | February 2, 1987 | February 11, 1987 | Corazon Aquino |

=== Secretary of Foreign Affairs (from 1987) ===
President Corazon Aquino issued Administrative Order No. 15 on February 11, 1987, converting all ministries into departments headed by secretaries.

| Portrait | Name (Birth–Death) | Took office | Left office | President |
|---|---|---|---|---|
| | Manuel Yan (1920–2008) | February 11, 1987 | October 15, 1987 | Corazon Aquino |
| | Raul Manglapus (1918–1999) | October 15, 1987 | June 30, 1992 | Corazon Aquino |
| | Roberto Romulo (1938–2022) | June 30, 1992 | April 30, 1995 | Fidel V. Ramos |
| | Domingo Siazon Jr. (1939–2016) | April 30, 1995 | January 20, 2001 | Fidel V. Ramos |
| | Domingo Siazon Jr. (1939–2016) | April 30, 1995 | January 20, 2001 | Joseph Estrada |
| | Teofisto Guingona Jr. (born 1928) | February 9, 2001 | July 15, 2002 | Gloria Macapagal Arroyo |
| | Gloria Macapagal Arroyo (Note: In concurrent capacity as the President.) (born 1947); Acting | July 15, 2002 | July 16, 2002 | Gloria Macapagal Arroyo |
| | Blas Ople (1927–2003) | July 16, 2002 | December 14, 2003 | Gloria Macapagal Arroyo |
| | Franklin Ebdalin; Acting | December 14, 2003 | December 22, 2003 | Gloria Macapagal Arroyo |
| | Delia Albert (born 1942) | December 22, 2003 | August 18, 2004 | Gloria Macapagal Arroyo |
| | Alberto Romulo (born 1933) | August 18, 2004 | February 23, 2011 | Gloria Macapagal Arroyo |
| | Alberto Romulo (born 1933) | August 18, 2004 | February 23, 2011 | Benigno Aquino III |
| | Albert del Rosario (1939–2023) | February 23, 2011 | March 7, 2016 | Benigno Aquino III |
| | Rene Almendras (born 1960); Acting | March 8, 2016 | June 30, 2016 | Benigno Aquino III |
| | Perfecto Yasay Jr. (1947–2020); Interim | June 30, 2016 | March 9, 2017 | Rodrigo Duterte |
| | Enrique Manalo (born 1952); Acting | March 9, 2017 | May 17, 2017 | Rodrigo Duterte |
| | Alan Peter Cayetano (born 1970) | May 18, 2017 | October 17, 2018 | Rodrigo Duterte |
| | Teodoro Locsin Jr. (born 1948) | October 17, 2018 | June 30, 2022 | Rodrigo Duterte |
| | Enrique Manalo (born 1952) | July 1, 2022 | July 1, 2025 | Bongbong Marcos |
| | Tess Lazaro (born 1959) | July 1, 2025 | Incumbent | Bongbong Marcos |
