= Philippines–Spain relations =

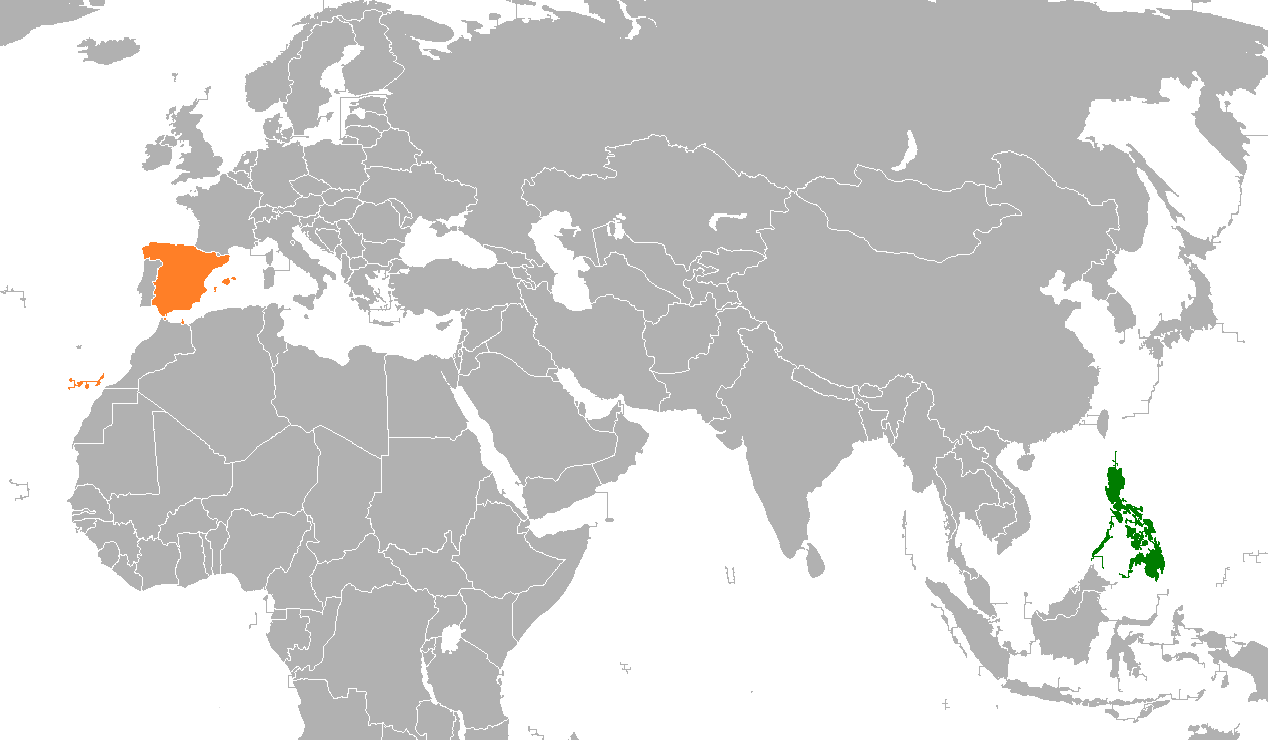

- Philippines: Spain

Diplomatic mission
- Philippine Embassy, Madrid: Spanish Embassy, Manila

Envoy
- Ambassador Philippe Lhuillier: Ambassador Miguel Utray Delgado

Philippines–Spain relations (Filipino: Ugnayang Pilipinas at Espanya; Spanish: Relaciones Filipinas y España) are the relations between the Republic of the Philippines and the Kingdom of Spain. Both nations are members of the Association of Academies of the Spanish Language and the United Nations.

== History ==
=== Precedents ===
Even before the formal Spanish conquest of the Philippines, on the islands there were already Muslims and Moors who had escaped from the recently overthrown Emirate of Granada. As Muslim Castilian speakers were recorded to have been in the area as they spread throughout the Muslim world even as far as Islamic Manila, one of them was a man named Pazeculan. This Castilian speaking Moor was in the service of the Rajah of Manila and Admiral of the Brunei Sultanate, Rajah Matanda, when he encountered the Magellan expedition.

=== Spanish conquest ===
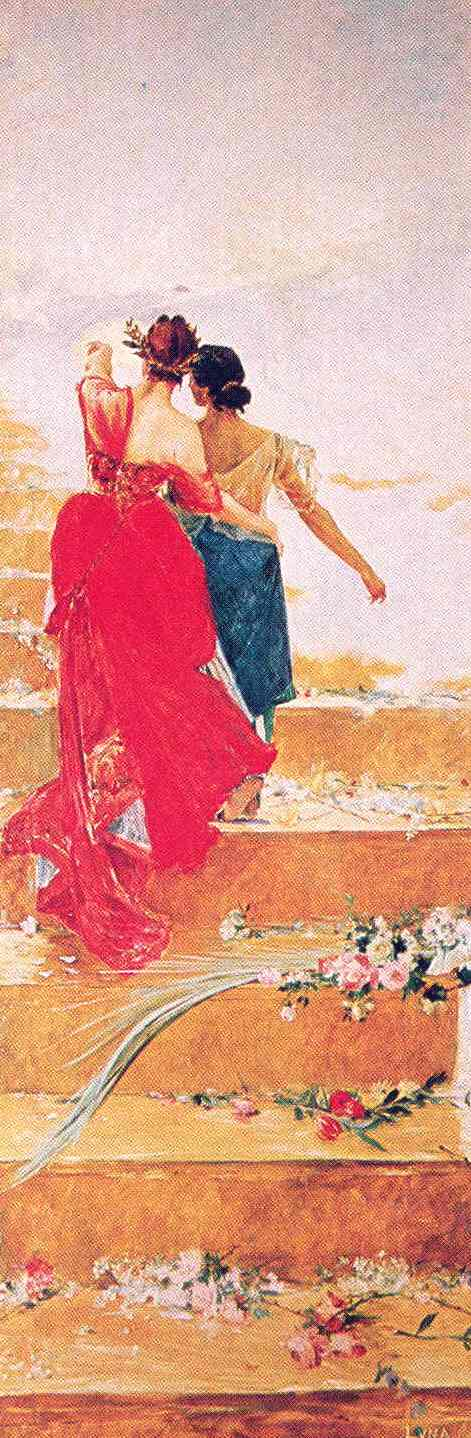
España y Filipinas by Juan Luna.

Spain and the Philippines share a common history in the fact that the Philippines was part of the Spanish Empire for three hundred years and was the sole Spanish colony in Asia. Portuguese explorer Ferdinand Magellan first encountered the Philippines and named the islands after King Philip II of Spain.

In 1565, Spanish explorer Miguel López de Legazpi arrived from present-day Mexico and established a European settlement in Cebu. Soon afterwards, the Captaincy General of the Philippines was governed from the Viceroyalty of New Spain, based in Mexico City. For the next 300 years, the Philippines was a Spanish province. Trade and communication between Spain and the Philippines was administered by the Manila galleon.

In 1896, the Philippine Revolution began for independence from Spain. The revolution lasted through 1898 when the Spanish–American War broke out. The Spanish–American War resulted in Spain losing its domain over the Philippines and the nation was transferred over to the United States, thus ending the Philippine Revolution. The Philippines would be governed by the United States until 1946.

=== Post Independence ===
During the Spanish Civil War, Filipino volunteers fought for both sides in the war. In 1947, the Philippines and Spain established diplomatic relations. It was manifested when Envoy Extraordinary and Minister Plenipotentiary Teodomiro de Aguilar presented his credentials to then-President Manuel Roxas on January 30, 1947. Aguilar mentioned to Roxas that his government had decided to establish a legation in the country as a living proof of the interest of Spain in this new republic.

On June 15, 1954, President Ramon Magsaysay's speech upon his acceptance of the credentials of Spanish Ambassador Extraordinary and Plenipotentiary Fermin Sanz Orio, was often heralded as the first time that a president used the national language to respond to a foreign envoy's credential speech.

On July 1, 1962, President Diosdado Macapagal and his entourage was welcomed by Generalissimo and Mrs. Francisco Franco upon their arrival at Barajas International Airport in Madrid.

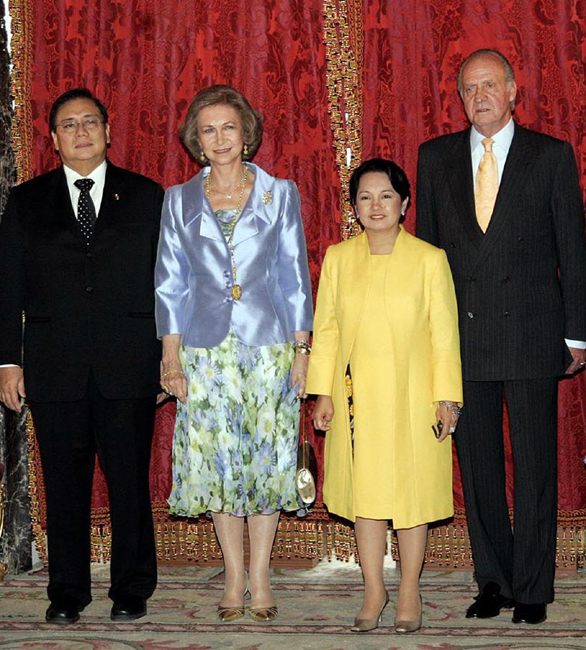
Filipino President Gloria Macapagal Arroyo and First Gentleman Jose Miguel Arroyo with Spanish King Juan Carlos I and Queen Sofía at the Royal Palace of Madrid, June 30, 2006.

Since the establishment of diplomatic relations, relations between both nations have strengthened through cultural and historical similarities. In 1995, King Juan Carlos I paid his first official visit to the Philippines. There have been several high-level visits between leaders of both nations.

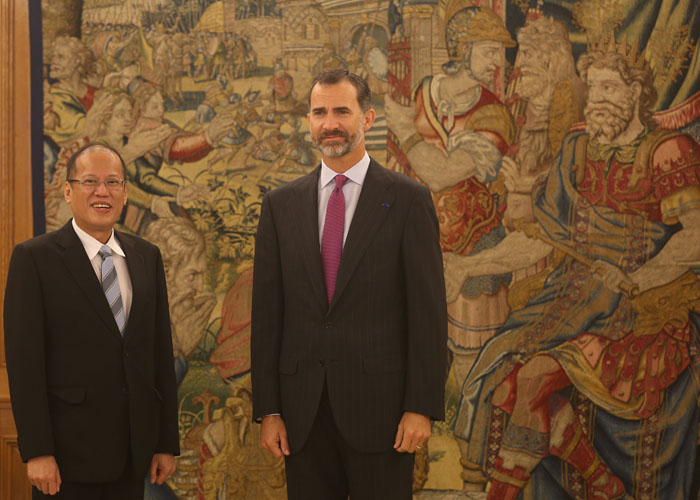
Filipino President Benigno Aquino III with Spanish King Felipe VI in Madrid, 2014.

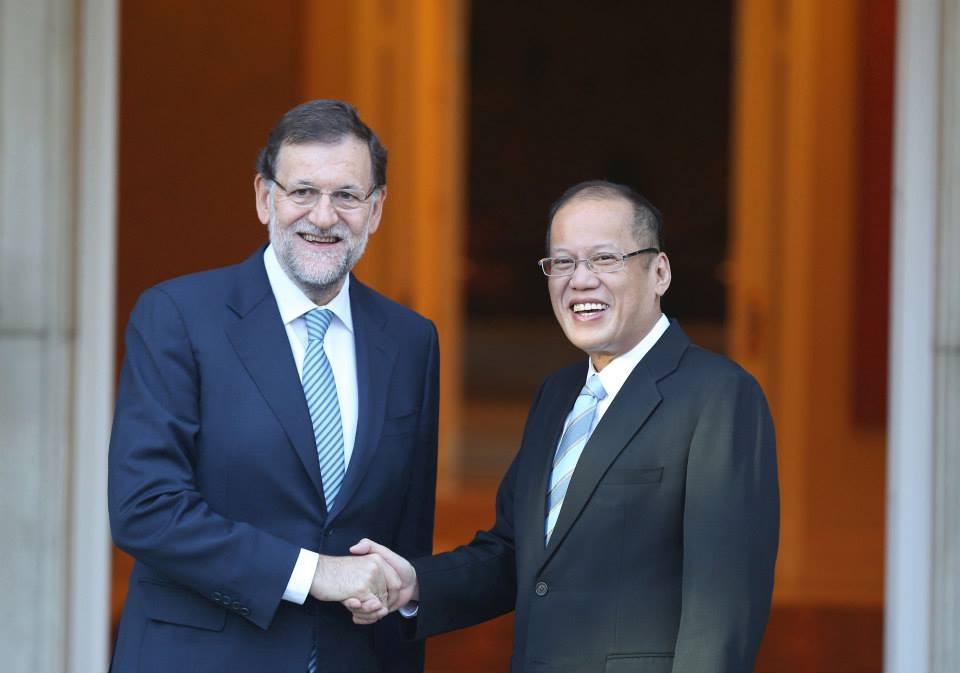
Filipino President Benigno Aquino III with Spanish Prime Minister Mariano Rajoy in Madrid, 2014.

King Juan Carlos I and his wife, Queen Sofia, attended the 1998 centennial celebrations in Manila, commemorating 100 years of independence from Spain. The mediation of the Spanish King is said to have produced the pardon and liberation of two Philippine domestic workers sentenced to death in Kuwait and the United Arab Emirates. Philippine President, Gloria Macapagal Arroyo, concluded her second state visit in Spain in July 2006, bringing back millions of dollars of Spanish investments, particularly in tourism and information technology.

Spanish Ambassador to the Philippines, Jorge Domecq, told the reporters that the "Philippines is the only country in Asia to receive more aid and development assistance from Spain than any other Asian country". He added that the Philippines remains a priority of the Spanish aid in development efforts and partnerships with the EU, even despite budget cuts on development funding brought on by austerity measures being implemented by the Government of Spain.

In July 2012, the Queen Sofia visited the Philippines for a fourth time. She inspected several development projects around the former Spanish colony that her country's government is funding via the AECID. She visited the National Library, National Museum and the University of Santo Tomas. She also met with Spanish nationals residing in the Philippines, and attend a reception at the Spanish Embassy. She also attended a state dinner in her honour at Malacañang Palace hosted by President Benigno Aquino III. Also during her visit in the country, Queen Sofia expressed appreciation to Aquino for the country's effort to reintroduce the Spanish language in the Philippine public education system.

Filipinos are one of the largest Asian communities in Spain, with a number of individuals obtaining Spanish citizenship. Most Filipinos in Spain work in various jobs and companies such as domestic and healthcare services, some individuals also work in education and government institutions.

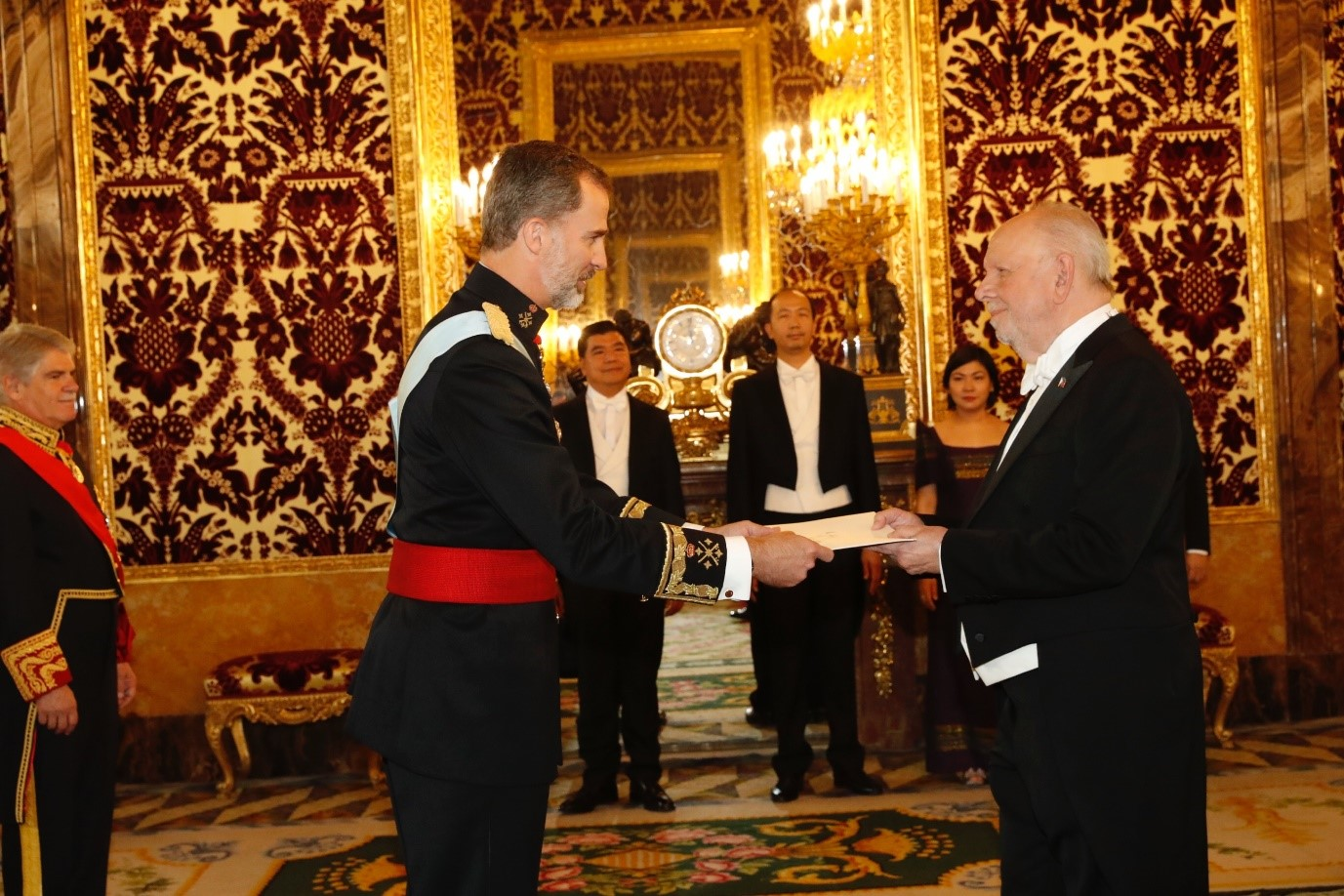
The Filipino Ambassador Philippe Jones Lhuillier, presents his Credentials to His Majesty King Felipe VI of Spain at the Palacio Real de Madrid.

In 2017, both nations celebrated 70 year of diplomatic relations. However, in 2019, the Philippine president, Rodrigo Duterte, dictated that he wanted to change the name of the country "Philippines" to "erase the Spanish historical trail", something he failed to do. On September 5 of the same year, the Spanish frigate Méndez Núñez made the historic port-visit, making it the first Spanish Navy vessel in the Philippines, since the Battle of Manila Bay during the Spanish–American War in 1898.

Currently, diplomatic relations between Spain and the Philippines are considerably weaker unlike the priorities that Spain has with other ASEAN countries, such as Cambodia, Indonesia, Singapore, Thailand, and Vietnam. However, their relations have continued to be maintained, based on a shared history and culture. Likewise, in 2022, both countries celebrated the 75th anniversary of the establishment of diplomatic relations.

== Cultural cooperation ==
Both countries have tried to rescue their historical ties. Since 2002, the Philippine–Spanish Friendship Day is celebrated every June 30, promoted with the aim of strengthening the relationship between both nations that share history, values, and traditions.

In 2009, Philippine academic and former president, Gloria Macapagal Arroyo, was awarded the Don Quixote International Prize, which recognized the Philippine educational initiative to introduce the Spanish language in the Philippines. In this sense, on February 23, 2010, during the V Spain-Philippines Tribune, an agreement was reached between the Ministries of Education of Spain and the Philippines, the Instituto Cervantes, and the AECID, by which all secondary school students in the Philippines have the option to study Spanish since 2012.

== Bilateral agreements ==
Both nations have signed several bilateral agreements such as:

- Treaty on Civil Rights and Consular Powers (1948)
- Treaty on the validity of academic degrees and the exercise of professions (1949)
- Air transportation agreement (1951)
- Agreement on the suppression of visas for diplomatic and official passport holders (1962)
- Agreement on technical cooperation in tourism (1971)
- Agreement on social security (1988)
- Agreement on economic and industrial cooperation (1988)
- Agreement to avoid double taxation and prevent tax evasion of income taxes (1989)
- Agreement for the promotion and reciprocal protection of investments (1992)
- Extradition treaty (2004)
- Memorandum of Understanding on Technical Cooperation in Matters of tourism (2007)
- Memorandum of Understanding of Cooperation in the field of Renewable Energies and Biofuels (2007)
- Agreement on Cultural, Sports and Educational Cooperation (2007)
- Treaty on transfer of convicted persons (2007)
- Agreement on cooperation in the fight against transnational crime (2015).

== Resident diplomatic missions ==
of the Philippines in Spain

- Madrid (Embassy)
- Barcelona (Consulate-General)

of Spain in the Philippines

- Manila (Embassy)
- Manila (Consulate-General)

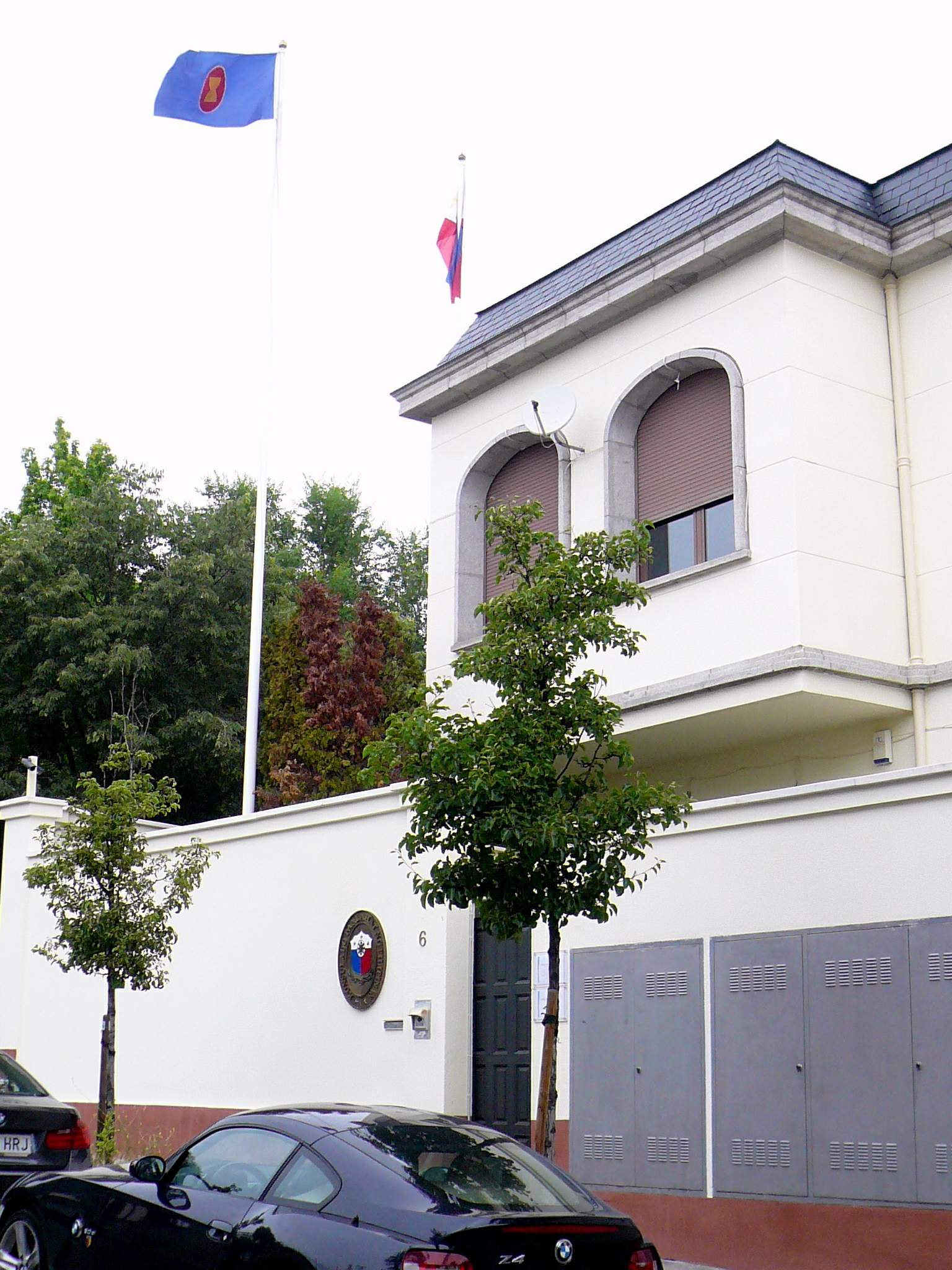
Embassy of the Philippines in Madrid

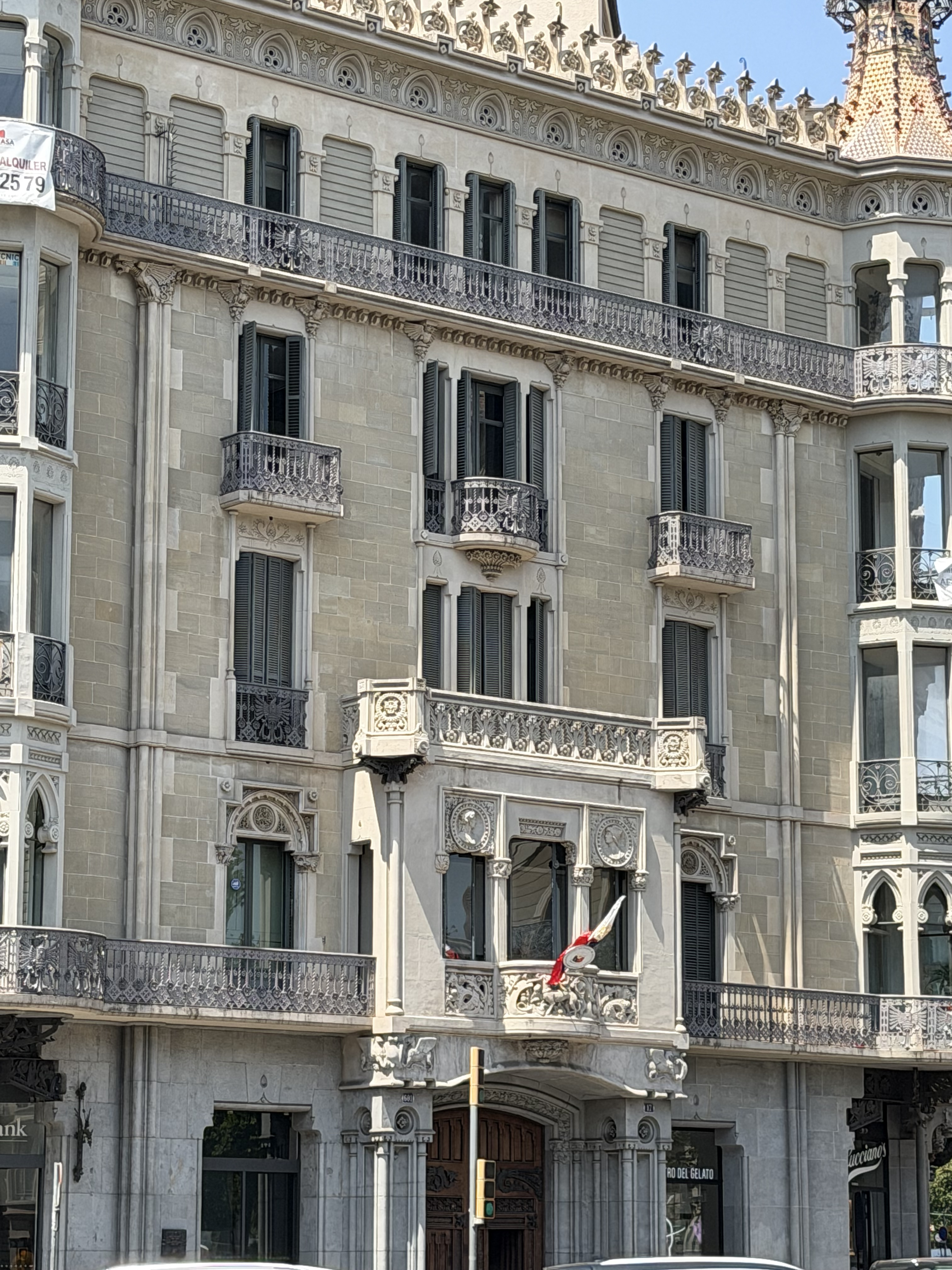
Consulate-General of the Philippines in Barcelona

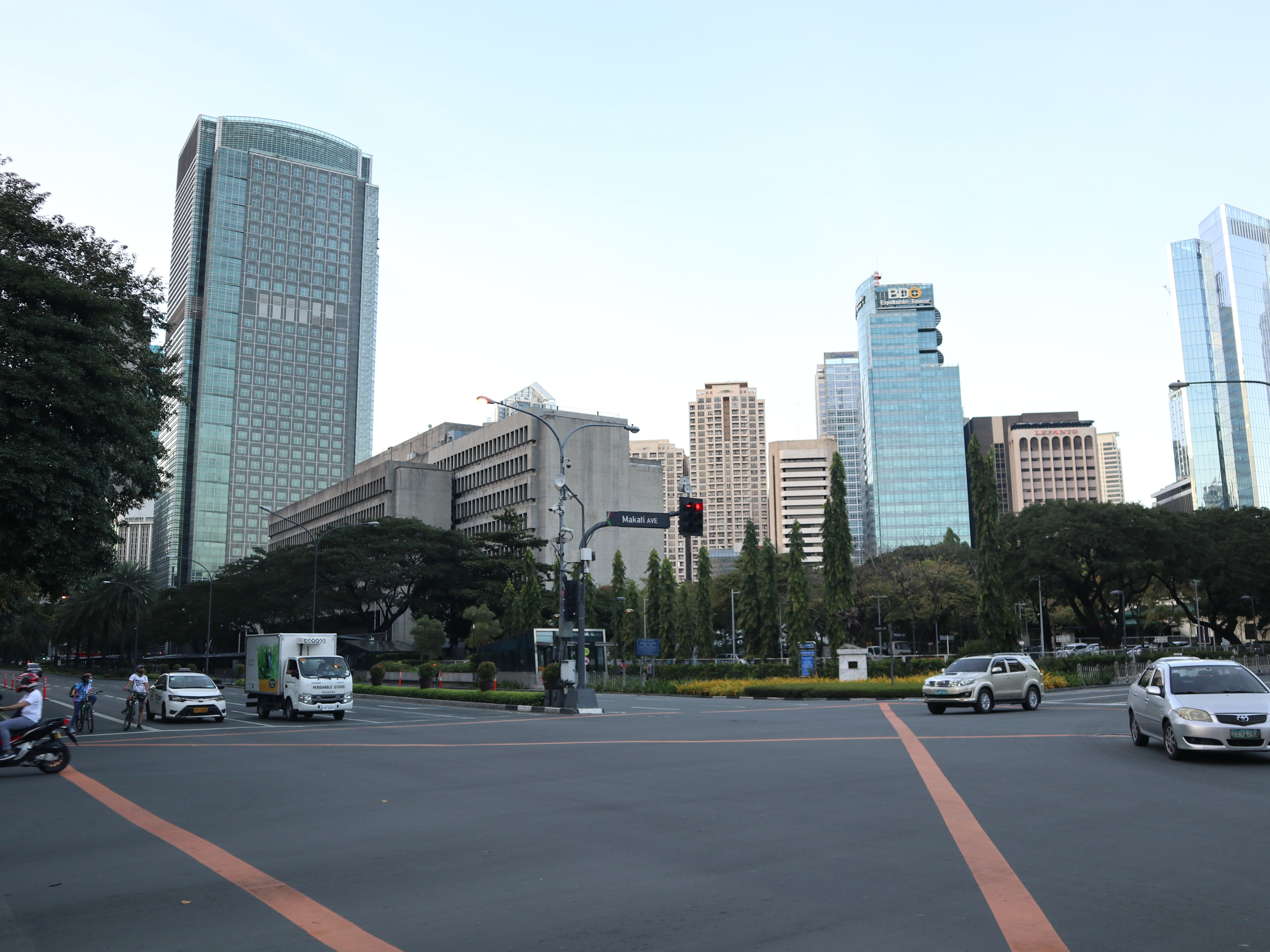
Torre BDO hosting the Embassy of Spain in Manila

== Country comparison ==
Official name	Republic of the Philippines	Kingdom of Spain
Common name	The Philippines	Spain
Native Name	Republika ng Pilipinas	Reino de España
Coat of Arms		
Flag	Philippines	Spain
National Motto	Maka-Diyos, Maka-Tao, Makakalikasan at Makabansa ("For God, People, Nature and Country")	Plus ultra ("Further beyond")
National Anthem	Lupang Hinirang ("Chosen Land")	Marcha Real ("Royal March")
Population	109,035,343	47,431,256
Area	343,448 km^{2} (132,606 mi^{2})	505,990 km^{2} (195,360 mi^{2})
Population Density	336/km^{2} (870/sq mi)	91.4/km^{2} (237/sq mi)
Time zones	Philippine Standard Time (UTC+08:00)	Central European Time (UTC+01:00)
Capital	Manila	Madrid
Largest Cities / Metropolitan Area	Quezon City – 2,960,048; Manila – 1,846,513; Davao City – 1,776,949	Madrid – 3,266,126; Barcelona – 1,636,762; Valencia – 794,288
Largest Cities / Metropolitan Area	Metropolitan Manila – 13,484,462	Metropolitan Madrid – 6,321,398
Established	12 June 1898 (Declaration); 4 July 1946 (Recognition); 2 February 1987 (Constitution)	20 January 1479 (Unification); 9 June 1715 (Centralization); 6 December 1978 (Constitution)
Trade bloc	Association of Southeast Asian Nations	European Union
Government	Unitary presidential constitutional republic	Unitary parliamentary constitutional monarchy
Predecessor States	Post–War Period (1945–1986); Philippine Commonwealth (1935–1946); Third Philippine Republic (1946–1972); Marcos Dictatorship (1972–1986) Democratic Period (1986–present); Provisional Government (1986–1987); Republic of the Philippines (1987–present)	Post–War Period (1898–1975); Spanish Restoration (1874–1931); Second Spanish Republic (1931–1939); Franco Dictatorship (1939–1975) Democratic Period (1975–present); Transitional Government (1975–1982); Kingdom of Spain (1982–present)
First Leader	Emilio Aguinaldo (official); Manuel Luis Quezon (de jure)	Carlos I (jure matris); Felipe II (suo jure)
First Leader	Emilio Aguinaldo (official); Manuel Luis Quezon (de jure)	Francisco Martínez de la Rosa (official)
Current Leader(s)	President: Bongbong Marcos (PFP)	Monarch: Felipe VI (Borbón–Anjou)
Current Leader(s)	Vice President: Sara Duterte (HNP)	Prime Minister: Pedro Sánchez (PSOE)
Legislature	Congress	Parliament
Legislature	Senate; President: Sherwin Gatchalian (NPC)	Senate; President: Pedro Rollán (PP)
Legislature	House of Representatives; Speaker: Faustino Dy III (PFP)	Congress of Deputies; President: Francina Armengol (PSIB–PSOE)
Judiciary	Supreme Court; Chief Justice: Alexander Gesmundo	Supreme Court; President: Isabel Perelló
Military	Armed Forces of the Philippines; Chief: Antonio Nafarrete	Spanish Armed Forces; Chief: Teodoro Esteban López Calderón
Military	Philippine Army; Philippine Air Force; Philippine Navy: Philippine Marine Corps	Spanish Army; Spanish Air Force; Spanish Navy: Spanish Navy Marines
Intelligence	National Intelligence Coordinating Agency; National Bureau of Investigation	National Intelligence Centre; Intelligence Center for Counter-Terrorism
Police Force	Philippine National Police; Chief: Jose Melencio Nartatez	National Police Corps; Director-General: Francisco Pardo Piqueras
Religion	Christianity: 88.7%; Islam: 6.0%; Irreligion: 0.1%; Others: 5.2%	Christianity: 75.2%; Irreligion: 21.0%; Islam: 3.3%; Others: 0.5%
National Language	Filipino (Tagalog)	Spanish (Castilian)
GDP (nominal)	US$811.726 billion ($7,846 per capita); Developing country	$1.242 trillion ($26,823 per capita); Developed country

== See also ==
- Foreign relations of the Philippines
- Foreign relations of Spain
- Spanish Filipino
- Spanish influence on Filipino culture
