= Dun Ailline Druid Brotherhood =

Spanish Celtic neopagan organization

Dun Ailline Druid Brotherhood - Spain
- Formation: 2010
- Type: Celtic Reconstructionist Paganism, Celtic neopaganism, Modern Paganism
- Location: Barcelona, Catalonia, Spain
- Official language: Gaeilge, Spanish, English
- Founders: Marta Vey
- Website: http://www.dunailline.org/

The Dun Ailline Druid Brotherhood (also known as Dun Ailline or HDDA, Hermandad Druida Dun Ailline in Spanish) is a pagan organization for followers of the Celtic Neopaganism based in Spain in 2010, which supports the practice of a type of Celtic Reconstructionist Paganism called Druidism, centered on the Celtic culture of Ireland, and whose principal deities are known as the Tuatha Dé Danann. Its members consider themselves practitioners of a European native religion and they call themselves creidim, a concept of Irish origin.

In Spain, the Dun Ailline Druidic Brotherhood is legally registered under the number and Irish name 2854-SG/A – Traidisiún na Beannach Fia Mór – Irish Reconstructionist Druid Tradition, being one of the first neopagan religions legally recognized in Spain, traditionally a Catholic country, with other organizations like the Fintan Druidic Order and the Celtiberic Wicca, among others.

== Druidism ==
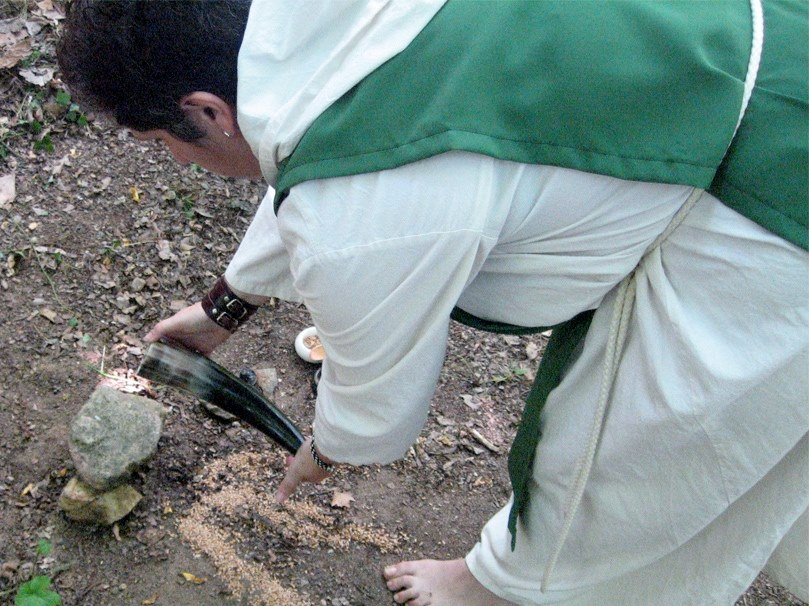
The Seanoir Marta Vey, celebrating one traditional offering.

The first revival of Druidism came from the hand of John Aubrey and John Toland. The September 21, 1716, day of the autumn equinox, the Druidic group of which John Toland was one of the members, was commissioned to proclaim symbolically at the top of Primrose Hill, and "facing the eye of light" (the sun), the call, for all Druids that may exist around the world, the assembly that was to take place on September 22, 1717 in London in the Apple Tree Tavern, Charles st., Coven garden. At the same time calls were sent by messengers to the various 'Bosquets or Groves' that were known to still exist. The delegates of the Druidic bardic circles and represented at the meeting of September 22, 1717 came from bosquets, groves or circles so far as London, York, Oxford, Wales, Cornwall, the Isle of Man, Anglesey, Scotland, Ireland and Armorica in France, especially of the town of Nantes.

Subsequently, because of the Irish diaspora, a new nativist Druidic line, centered on the reconstructionism of the culture, spirituality and folklore of Ireland arises in United States. The creidim honor the deities known as Tuatha Dé Danann, headed by An Dagda and oldest Celtic deities like Cernunnos. The word creidim means believer in Gaeilge.

== History ==
After the disappearance of the Ord Draiochta Na Uisnech (ODU, an Order set up by Kenn R. White) in 2009, this closed the Grove Magh Mor, a "grove" or community in Spain that ODU had dedicated to promoting the Tradition of the Great Stag. In 2010 Marta Vey founded the Dun Ailline Druid Brotherhood, in order to preserve and transmit the Tradition of the Great Stag. In the same year, 2010, a cultural association was created to focus on the reconstruction of Irish Paganism from the 6th-9th centuries, with the stated purpose to publicize their culture, customs and myths.

In October 2012, HDDA becomes recognized as a religious denomination by the Government of Spain.

In November 2012 was admitted as a full member of the Spanish Platform for Religious Freedom of Paganism, created with the purpose of obtaining legal rights to practitioners of pagan beliefs and serve as interlocutor with the Government of Spain.

In December 2014, the HDDA participates in the II Pagan Day held in L'Hospitalet de Llobregat, (Barcelona).

== Organizational structure ==
The organization is headed by the Ard droi / Ard Bandrui who legally represents the religious association, being also the religious leader of it.

HDDA base is formed by creidim. The priesthood is made by droi and Bandrui. Any creidim can access the priestly ordination if they meet the requirements.

In 2014, the founder Marta Vey was named Ard Bandrui by the priestly assembly, and was ratified as legal and religious representative of HDDA.

The creidim are organized into local groups that meet to hold various celebrations.

== Festivities ==
- Seasonal Celebrations
  - Samhain, Mean Geimhridh, Imbolc, Ostara, Beltane, Mean Samhraidh (see also Litha), Lughnassadh and the autumn Equinox, called Mean Foghamar (see also Mabon).
- Gui and Devotions
- Intraseasonal celebrations

== Beliefs ==
The Four Pillars of Druidism and the Six Celtic Virtues, ethical code that suggest the behavior patterns of the creidim.

Celtic Virtues
Honor
Honesty
Justice
Hospitality
Loyalty
Courage
Basic beliefs are:
- Multiple lives
- Spirit in all things
- Reverence for the ancestors
- Believe in multiple worlds

== Sacred texts ==
Awen

- The Mythological Cycle (The Lebor Gabála Érenn, The First and Second battle of Cath Maige Tuired, Togail Bruidne Dá Derga,...)
- The Ulster Cycle or Rúraíocht (Táin Bó Cúailnge, Lebor na hUidre...)
- The Fenian Cycle, also known as Fiannaidheacht.
- The Cycles of the Kings, (Immram), the travels to Tír na nÓg, among other tales and legends.
- Other texts are the (Brehon Laws, Carmina Gadelica by Alexander Carmichael, the Druidic Triads...)

== See also ==
- Celtic neopaganism
- Celtic Reconstructionist Paganism
- Dún Ailinne, ancient ceremonial site on the hill of Cnoc Ailinne (Knockaulin) in County Kildare, Ireland
- Minor religions in Spain
- Neo-Druidism
