= Religion in Spain =

Answer to the question 'How do you define yourself in religious matters?' in Spain (CIS survey; sample size: 4,020; September 2026)
1. Non-Practicing Catholic (38.5%)
2. Practicing Catholic (15.9%)
3. Atheist (17.1%)
4. Agnostic (12.2%)
5. Indifferent or no religion (11.3%)
6. Other faiths (3.20%)
7. Unanswered (1.70%)

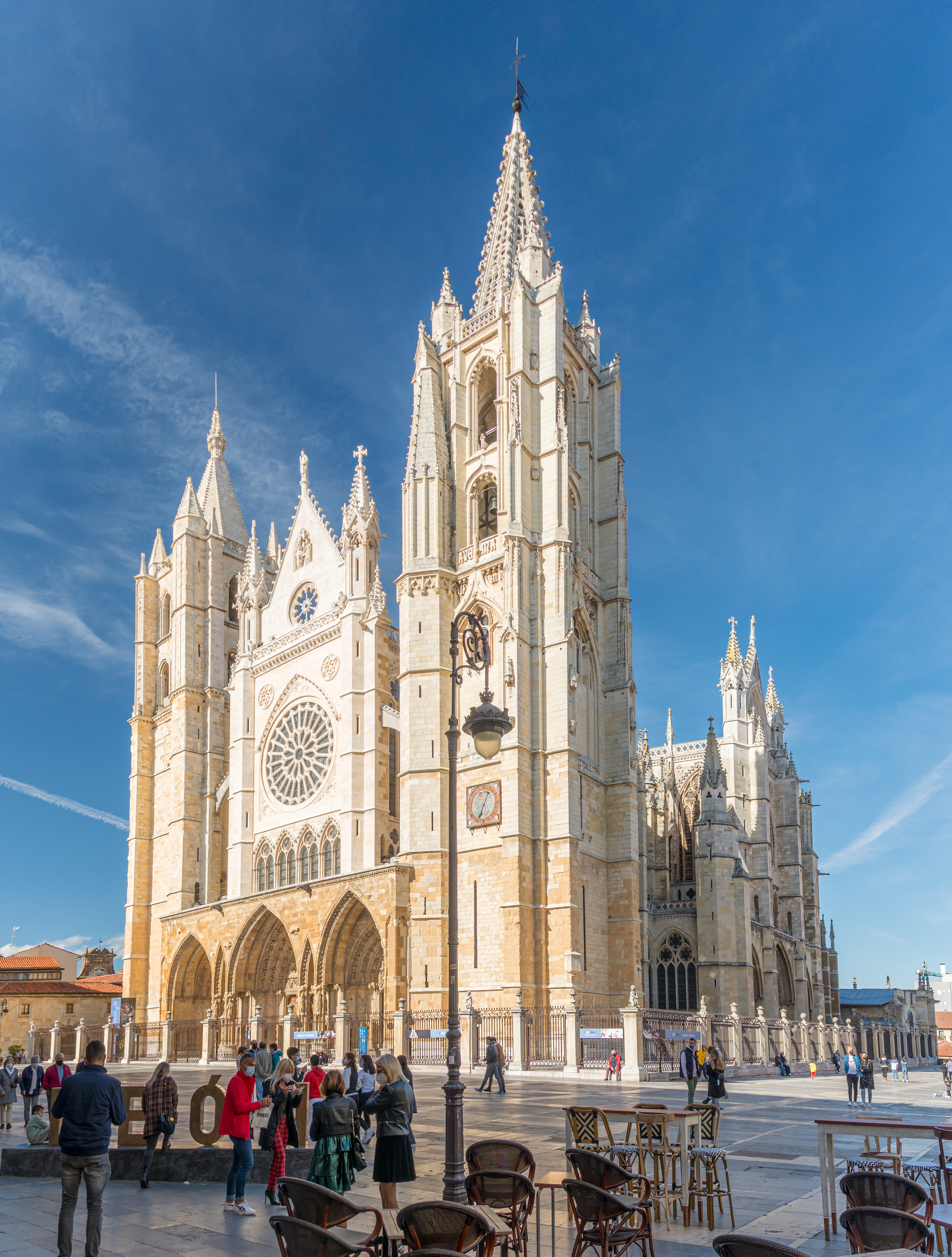
León Cathedral is a World Heritage Site.

Christianity is the most widely professed religion in Spain, with Catholicism being its main denomination, along with high levels of secularization as of 2026.

Spain is a secular state and freedom of religion is guaranteed by the Spanish Constitution. Immigration over the past several decades has brought a diverse plethora of faiths from around the world to the country.

== Overview ==
The Pew Research Center ranked Spain as the 16th out of 34 European countries in levels of religiosity, with 21% of the population declaring they were "highly religious" in the poll. 3% of Spaniards consider religion as one of their three most important values, lower than the 5% European average.

According to the Spanish Center for Sociological Research (CIS), 54.3% of Spanish citizens self-identify as Catholics (36.3% define themselves as non-practicing, while 18% as practicing), 3% as followers of other faiths (including Islam, Protestant Christianity, Judaism, Buddhism, Hinduism etc.), and 41% as non-believer, these being: atheists (17%), indifferent or no religion (11.1%), or agnostics (13%), as of April 2026.

Most Spaniards do not participate regularly in weekly religious worship. An April 2026 study shows that of the Spaniards who identify themselves as religious, 25.8% never attend Mass, 22.7% barely ever attend Mass, 23.5% attend Mass a few times a year, 10% two or three times per month, 12.1% every Sunday and holidays, and 4.5% multiple times per week.

Although a majority of Spaniards self-identify as Catholics, younger generations tend to ignore the Church's moral doctrines on issues such as pre-marital sex, homosexuality, same-sex marriage or contraception. The total number of parish priests shrank from 24,300 in 1975 to 18,500 in 2018, with an average age of 65.5 years. By contrast, many expressions of popular religiosity still thrive, often linked to local festivals. Several instances of Catholic cultural practices are present among the general population, such as Catholic baptisms and funerals, Holy Week processions, pilgrimages (such as the Way of St. James), patron saints and many festivals.

A Survey published in 2019 by the Pew Research Center found that 54% of Spaniards had a favorable view of Muslims, while 76% had a favorable view of Jews. Only 1% of Spaniards are Protestant and most Protestants have an immigrant background.

The patron saint of Spain is St. James the Greater.

== History ==
Spain, it has been observed, is a nation-state born out of religious struggle mainly between Catholicism and Islam, but also against Judaism (and, to a lesser extent, Protestantism). The Reconquista against Al Andalus (ending in 1492), the establishment of the Spanish Inquisition (1478) and the expulsion of Jews (1492) were highly relevant in the union of Castile and Aragon under the Catholic Monarchs Isabel and Fernando (1492), followed by the persecution and eventual expulsion of the Moriscos in 1609. The Counter-Reformation (1563–1648) was especially strong in Spain and the Inquisition was not definitively abolished until 1834, thus continuing their animosity towards Islam, Judaism, Protestantism and parts of the Enlightenment for most of its history.

Judaism and Christianity were introduced in the Iberian Peninsula in Roman times, with the latter absorbing many elements from "pagan" practices that survived for a while even among Christianized populations. Islam was introduced in the Iberian Peninsula after the Muslim conquest in the 8th century, which resulted in the establishment of Al-Andalus. In the late 15th to early 16th century, Jews and Muslims were forced to choose between conversion or expulsion, with the fostering of Catholic uniformity across the territory remaining a major concern for both State and Church authorities throughout the two following centuries.

Connected to the Old Regime, the Catholic Church became the most controversial institution in Spain in the 19th and 20th centuries, struggling to find ways to relate to the nascent liberal society as well as clashing with governments seeking to find an acceptable delimitation of the role of religion in public affairs. Since the end of the Francoist dictatorship practical secularization has grown strongly. The 1978 Constitution abolished Catholicism as the official religion of the state, while recognizing "the religious beliefs of all Spaniards" and establishing "appropriate cooperation" with the Catholic Church and other confessions.

=== Antiquity and late Antiquity ===
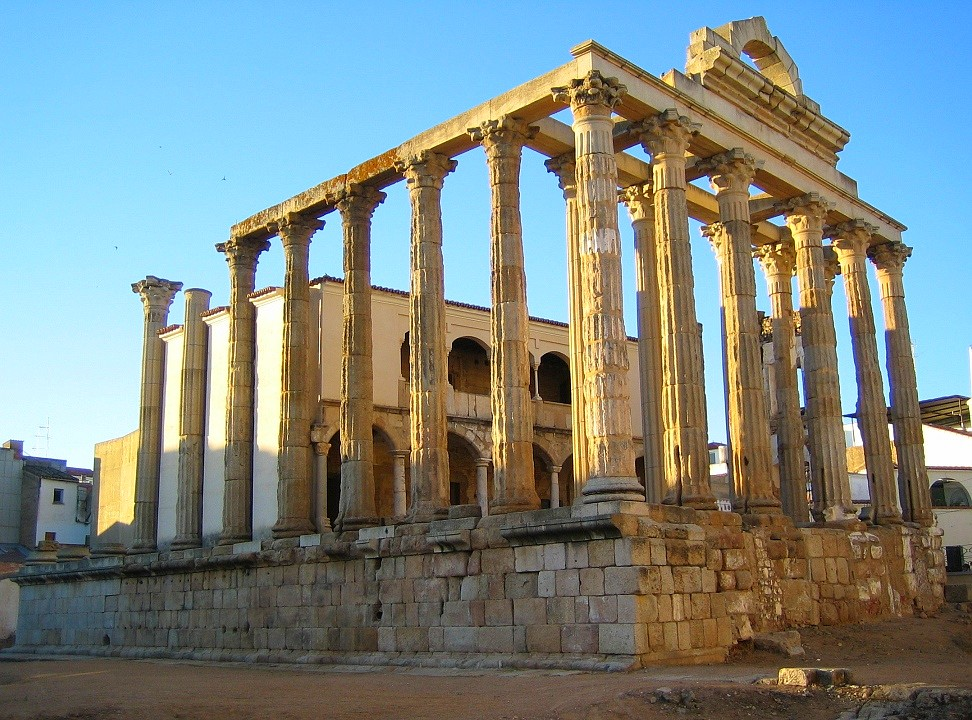
The rebuilt Roman temple of Diana in Mérida

Before Christianity, there were multiple beliefs in the Iberian Peninsula including local Iberian, Celtiberian and Celtic religions, as well as the Greco-Roman religion.

According to a medieval legend, the apostle James was the first to spread Christianity in the Roman Iberian Peninsula. He later became the patron saint of Spaniards and Portuguese, originating the Way of St James. According to Romans 15, Paul the Apostle also intended to visit Hispania; tradition has that he did and founded the Diocese of Écija. Other later myths include the Seven Apostolic Men.

There is some archaeological evidence of Christianity slowly penetrating the Peninsula from Rome and Roman Mauretania via major cities and ports, especially Tarragona, since the early 2nd century. The Paleo-Christian Necropolis of Tarragona, with 2,050 discovered tombs, dates back to the second half of the 3rd century. Saints like Eulalia of Mérida or Barcelona and many others are believed to have been martyred during the Decian or Diocletianic Persecutions (3rd–early 4th centuries). Bishops like Basílides of Astorga, Marcial of Mérida or the influential Hosius of Corduba were active in the same period.

Theodosius I issued decrees that effectively made Nicene Christianity the official state church of the Roman Empire. This Christianity was already an early form of Catholicism.

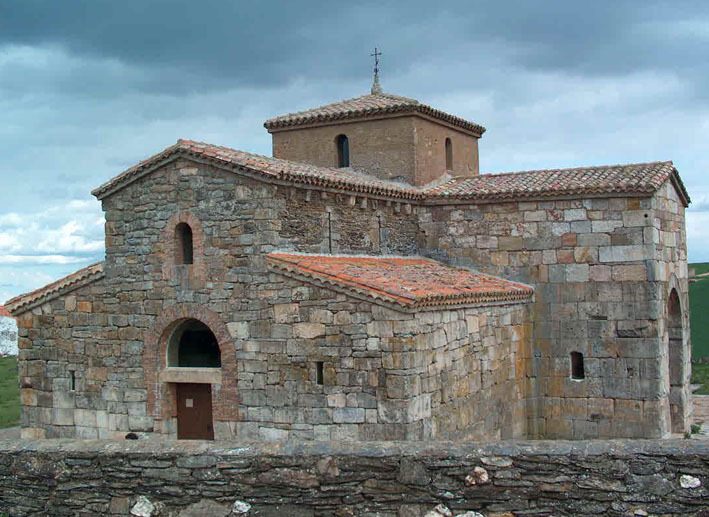
The 7th-century Visigothic church of San Pedro de la Nave

As Rome declined, Germanic tribes invaded most of the lands of the former empire. In the years following 410 the Visigoths—who had converted to Arian Christianity around 360—occupied what is now Spain and Portugal. The Visigothic Kingdom established its capital in Toledo; it reached its high point during the reign of Leovigild (568–586). Visigothic rule led to a brief expansion of Arianism in Spain, however the native population remained staunchly Catholic. In 587 Reccared, the Visigothic king at Toledo, converted to Catholicism and launched a movement to unify doctrine. The Council of Lerida in 546 constrained the clergy and extended the power of law over them under the blessings of Rome. The multiple Councils of Toledo definitively established what would be later known as the Catholic Church in Spain and contributed to define Catholicism elsewhere.

=== Middle Ages ===
By the early 8th century, the Visigothic kingdom had fragmented and the fragments were in disarray, bankrupt and willing to accept external help to fight each other. In 711 an Arab raiding party led by Tariq ibn-Ziyad crossed the Strait of Gibraltar, then defeated the Visigothic king Roderic at the Battle of Guadalete. Tariq's commander, Musa bin Nusair, then landed with substantial reinforcements. Taking advantage of the Visigoths' infighting, by 718 the Muslims dominated most of the peninsula, establishing Islamic rule until 1492.

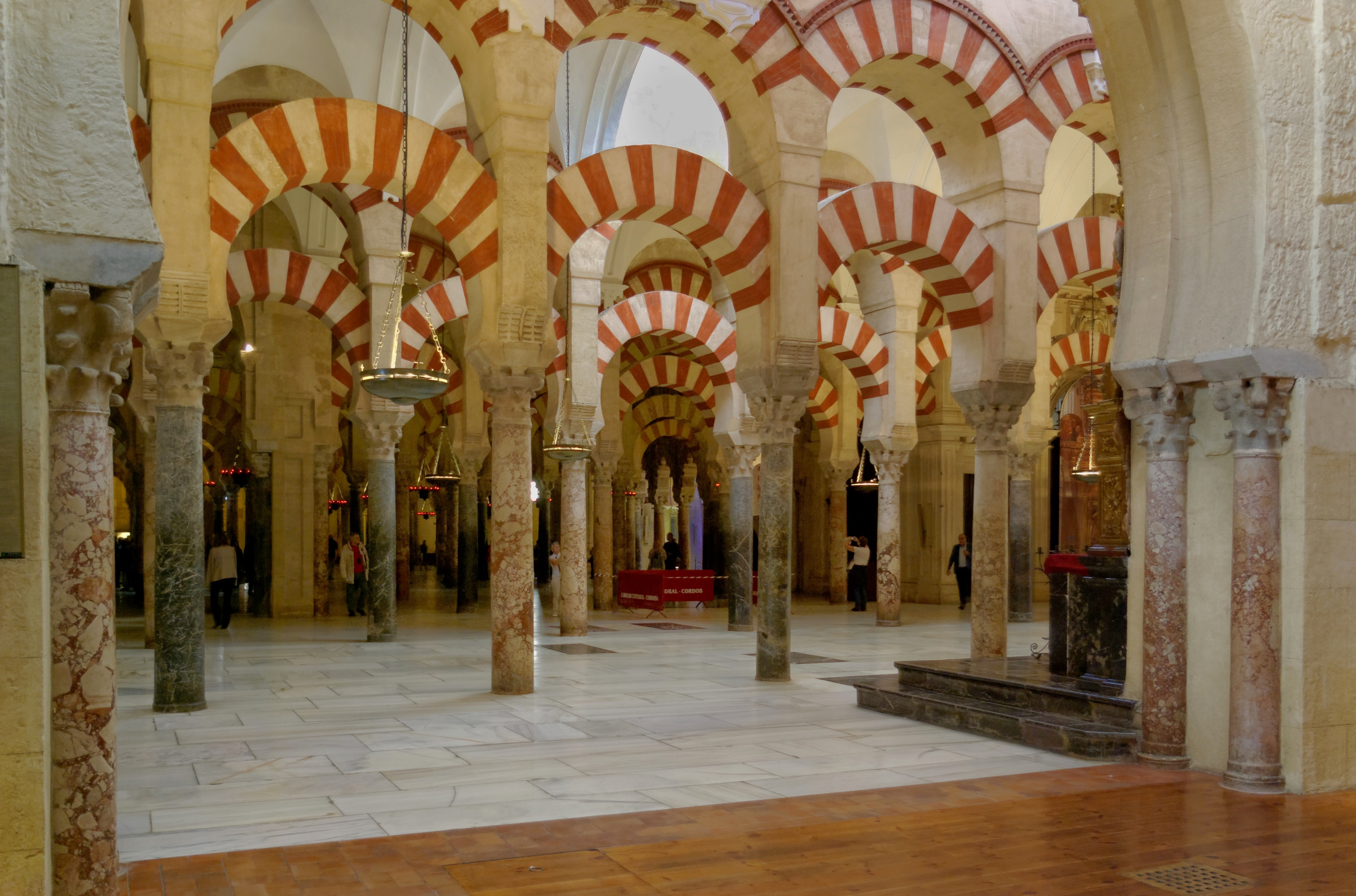
The Great Mosque of Córdoba turned church after the Reconquista.

During this period the number of Muslims increased greatly through the migration of Arabs and Berbers, and the conversion of local Christians to Islam (known as Muladis or Muwalladun) with the latter forming the majority of the Islamic-ruled area by the end of the 10th century. Most Christians who remained adopted Arabic culture, and these Arabized Christians became known as Mozarabs.

The era of Muslim rule before 1055 is often considered a "Golden Age" for the Jews as Jewish intellectual and spiritual life flourished in Spain. Only in the northern fringes of the peninsula did Christians remain under Christian rule. Here they established the great pilgrimage centre of Santiago de Compostela.

In 1147, following the Almohads takeover of the bulk of Al-Andalus, Christians living in Muslim-ruled territory faced harsher treatment. Faced with the choice of death, conversion, or emigration, many Jews and Christians emigrated.

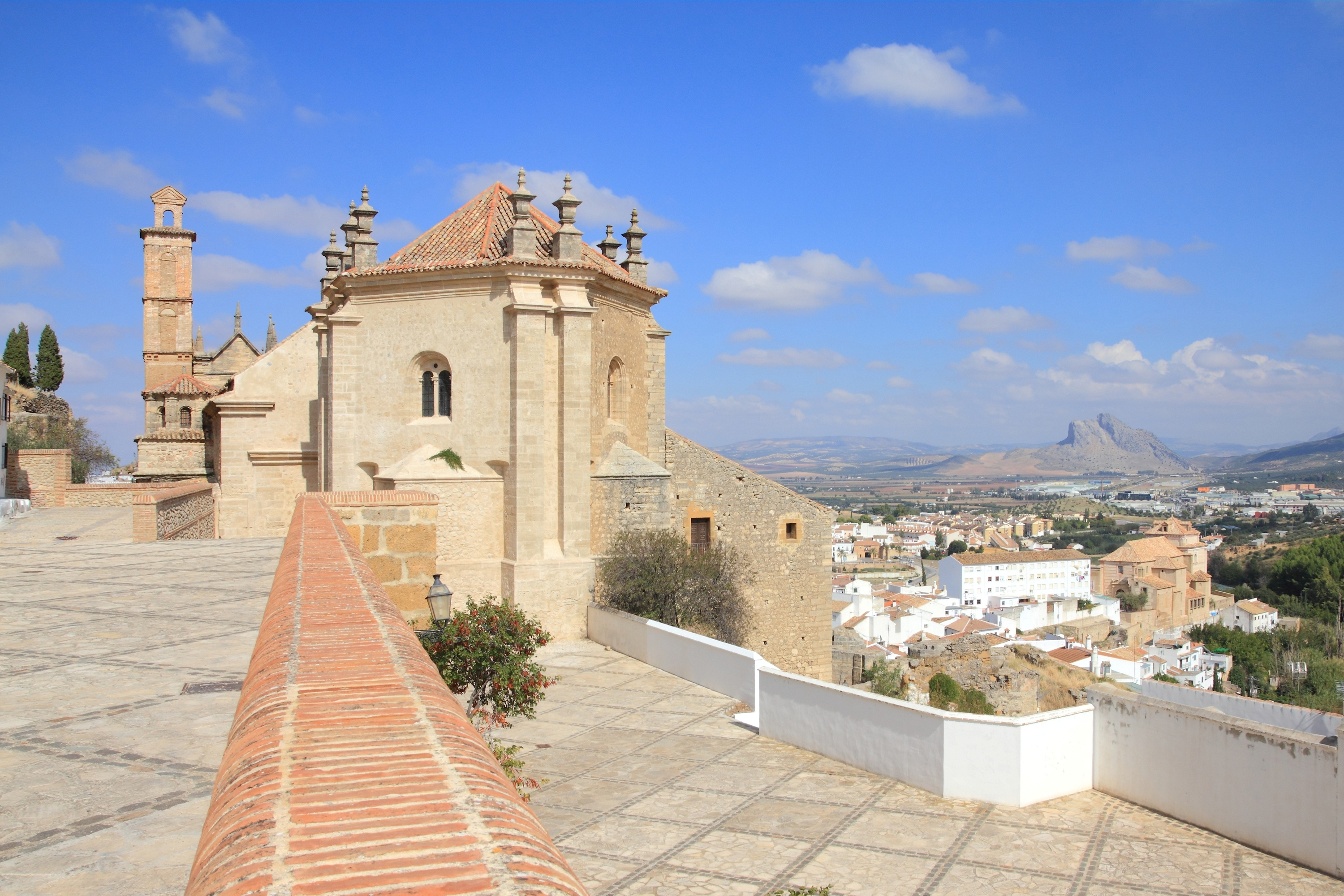
Royal Collegiate Church of Santa María la Mayor in Antequera, Andalusia

The Catholic Monarchs established the Tribunal of the Holy Office of the Inquisition (also known as the Spanish Inquisition) in 1478. An ethno-religious cleansing of Jews, Muslims, and former Muslims took place in the Iberian Peninsula from the late 15th to early 17th centuries under the purview of a series of royal decrees.

=== Modern period ===
In the early modern Period, the Crown saw itself as the bulwark of Catholicism and doctrinal purity. Catholicism was introduced in the New World and the Philippines under Spanish colonialism, but the monarchs insisted on independence from papal "interference". Bishops were forbidden to report to the Pope except through the Crown. In 1767, under the Bourbon dynasty, the Crown banished the Jesuits from the Spanish Empire. The Inquisition was ended for good in 1848. Religious freedom continued to be denied in practice, if not in theory.

=== Concordat of 1851 ===
Catholicism became the state religion in 1851, when the Spanish government signed a Concordat with the Holy See that committed Madrid to pay the salaries of the clergy and to subsidize other expenses of the Roman Catholic Church as a compensation for the seizure of church property in the Desamortización de Mendizábal of 1835–1837. This pact was renounced in 1931, when the secular constitution of the Second Spanish Republic imposed a series of secularist measures that threatened the Church's hegemony in Spain, provoking the Church's support for the Francisco Franco uprising five years later. In the ensuing Spanish Civil War, alleged communists and anarchists in Republican areas killed about 7,000 priests, the majority murdered between July and December 1936. Over four thousand were diocesan priests, as well as 13 bishops, and 2,365 male regulars or religious priests. On the other hand, the small Protestant minority was harshly persecuted by the "national" side, most churches were closed and many priests and religious figures were jailed or killed.

=== Second Spanish Republic ===
On 9 December 1931, the Spanish Constitution of 1931 established a secular state and freedom of religion in the Second Spanish Republic. It would remain in effect until 1 April 1939.

=== Francoist Spain ===
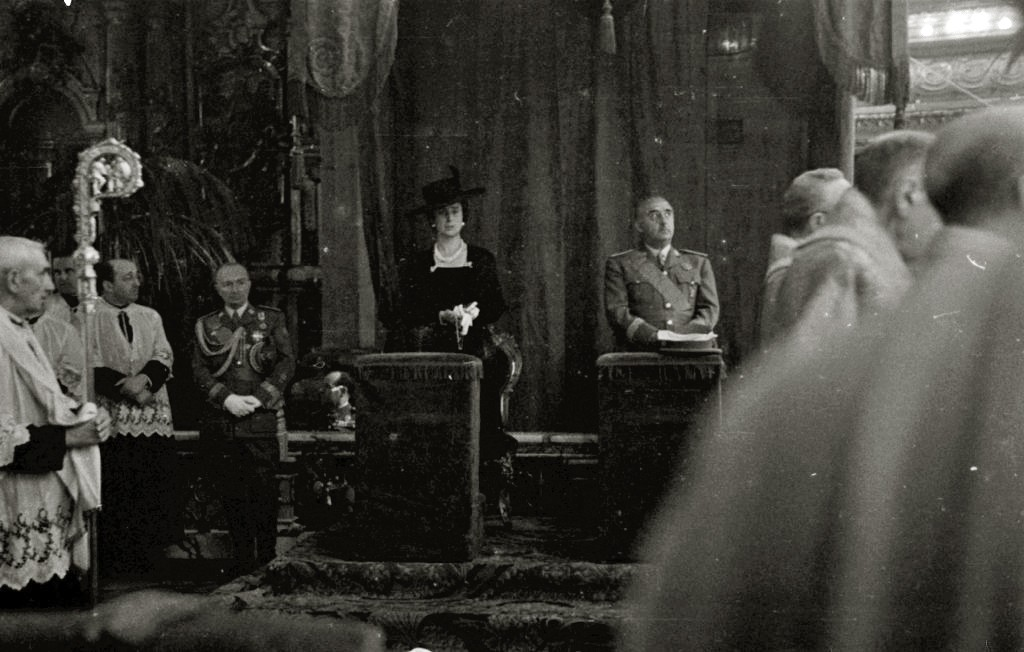
Dictator Francisco Franco and his wife attending Mass.

The advent of the Francoist dictatorship saw the restoration of the church's privileges, pursuant to the ideological tenets of National Catholicism. While in agreement with the Catholic doctrine in regards of the opposition to sterilization and euthanasia, the regime, imbued of a "deeply Catholic" approach, advocated for "environmental eugenics" instead, enforcing coercive measures justifying the repression, segregation and elimination of its political enemies, otherwise overlapping with a racial discourse that identified the decline of the Spanish race with republican policies and ideology.

Under Francoism, Roman Catholicism was the only religion to have legal status; other worship services could not be advertised, and no other religion could own property or publish books. The Government not only continued to pay priests' salaries and to subsidize the Church, it also assisted in the reconstruction of church buildings damaged by the war. Laws were passed abolishing divorce and civil marriages as well as banning abortion and the sale of contraceptives. Homosexuality and all other forms of sexual permissiveness were also banned. Catholic religious instruction was mandatory, even in public schools. Franco secured in return the right to name Roman Catholic bishops in Spain, as well as veto power over appointments of clergy down to the parish priest level.

In 1953 this close cooperation was formalized in a new Concordat with the Vatican that granted the church an extraordinary set of privileges: mandatory canonical marriages for all Catholics; exemption from government taxation; subsidies for new building construction; censorship of materials the Church deemed offensive; the right to establish universities, to operate radio stations, and to publish newspapers and magazines; protection from police intrusion into church properties; and exemption of military service.

The proclamation of the Second Vatican Council in favor of religious freedom in 1965 provided more rights to other religious denominations in Spain. In the late 1960s, the Vatican attempted to reform the Church in Spain by appointing interim, or acting, bishops, thereby circumventing Franco's stranglehold on the country's clergy. Many young priests, under foreign influence, became worker priests and participated in anti-regime agitation. Many of them ended as leftist politicians, with some imprisoned in the Concordat prison reserved for priest prisoners. In 1966, the Franco regime passed a law that freed other religions from many of the earlier restrictions, but the law also reaffirmed the privileges of the Catholic Church. Any attempt to revise the 1953 Concordat met Franco's rigid resistance.

=== Separation of church and state since 1978 ===
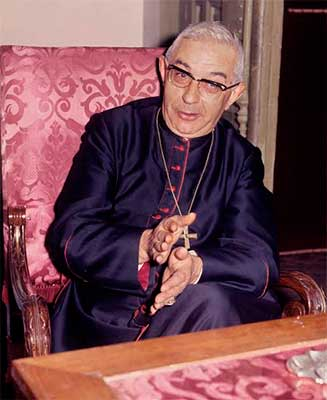
Cardinal Vicente Enrique y Tarancón adopted a democratic stance and was decisive in separating church from state in Spain. As a result, he received continuous death threats from hardline Francoists, including far-right Catholics, until democracy was well established; "¡Tarancón al paredón!" (Tarancón to the execution wall!) was a common slogan.

In 1976, however, King Juan Carlos de Borbon unilaterally renounced the right to name the bishops; later that year, Madrid and the Vatican signed a new accord that restored to the church its right to name bishops, and the Church agreed to a revised Concordat that entailed a gradual financial separation of church and state. Church property not used for religious purposes was henceforth to be subject to taxation, and over a period of years the Church's reliance on state subsidies was to be gradually reduced. The timetable for this reduction was not adhered to, however, and the church continued to receive the public subsidy through 1987 (US$110 million in that year alone).

It took the new 1978 Spanish Constitution to confirm the right of Spaniards to religious freedom and to begin the process of disestablishing Catholicism as the state religion. The drafters of the Constitution tried to deal with the intense controversy surrounding state support of the Church, but they were not entirely successful. The initial draft of the Constitution did not even mention the Church, which was included almost as an afterthought and only after intense pressure from the church's leadership. Article 16 disestablishes Roman Catholicism as the official religion and provides that religious liberty for non-Catholics is a state-protected legal right, thereby replacing the policy of limited toleration of non-Catholic religious practices. The article further states, however, that: "The public authorities shall take the religious beliefs of Spanish society into account and shall maintain the consequent relations of cooperation with the Catholic Church and the other confessions."

In addition, Article 27 also aroused controversy by appearing to pledge continuing government subsidies for private, Church-affiliated schools. These schools were sharply criticized by Spanish Socialists for having created and perpetuated a class-based, separate, and unequal school system. The Constitution, however, includes no affirmation that the majority of Spaniards are Catholics or that the state should take into account the teachings of Catholicism. The Constitution declares Spain a "non-confessional" state, however it is not a secular state like France or Mexico.

Government financial aid to the Catholic Church was a difficult and contentious issue. The Church argued that, in return for the subsidy, the state had received the social, health, and educational services of tens of thousands of priests and nuns who fulfilled vital functions that the state itself could not have performed at that time. Nevertheless, the revised Concordat was supposed to replace direct state aid to the church with a scheme that would allow taxpayers to designate a certain portion of their taxes to be diverted directly to the Church. Through 1985, taxpayers were allowed to deduct up to 10 percent from their taxable income for donations to the Catholic Church.

Partly because of the protests against this arrangement from representatives of Spain's other religious groups and even from some Catholics, the tax laws were changed in 2007 so that taxpayers could choose between giving 0.52 percent of their income tax to the church and allocating it to the government's welfare and culture budgets. For three years, the government would continue to give the Church a gradually reduced subsidy, but after that the church would have to subsist on its own resources. The government would continue, however, its program of subsidizing Catholic schools, which in 1987 cost the Spanish taxpayers about US$300 million exclusive of the salaries of teachers, which were paid directly by the Ministry of Education and Science.

In a population of about 39 million at the beginning of Transition (begun in November 1975), the number of non-Catholics was probably no more than 300,000. About 290,000 of these were of other Christian faiths, including several Protestant denominations, Jehovah's Witnesses, and members of The Church of Jesus Christ of Latter-day Saints. The number of Jews in Spain was estimated at 13,000 in the Murcia Jewish community. More than 19 out of every 20 Spaniards were baptized Catholics; about 60 percent of them attended Mass; about 30 percent of the baptized Catholics did so regularly, although this figure declined to about 20 percent in the larger cities. In 1979, about 97 percent of all marriages were performed according to the Catholic rite. A 1982 report by the church claimed that 82 percent of all children born the preceding year had been baptized in the church.

Nevertheless, there were forces at work bringing about fundamental changes in the place of the church in society. One such force was the improvement in the economic fortunes of the great majority of Spaniards, making society more materialistic and less religious. Another force was the Massive shift in population from farm and village to the growing urban centers, where the church had less influence over the values of its members. These changes were transforming the way Spaniards defined their religious identity.

Being a Catholic in Spain had less and less to do with regular attendance at Mass and more to do with the routine observance of important rituals such as baptism, marriage, and burial of the dead. A 1980 survey revealed that, although 82 percent of Spaniards were believers in Catholicism, very few considered themselves to be very good practitioners of the faith. In the case of the youth of the country, even smaller percentages believed themselves to be "very good" or "practicing" Catholics.

In contrast to an earlier era, when rejection of the church went along with education, in the late 1980s studies showed that the more educated a person was, the more likely he or she was to be a practicing Catholic. This new acceptance of the church was due partly to the church's new self-restraint in politics. In a significant change from the pre-Civil War era, the church had accepted the need for the separation of religion and the state, and it had even discouraged the creation of a Christian Democratic party in the country.

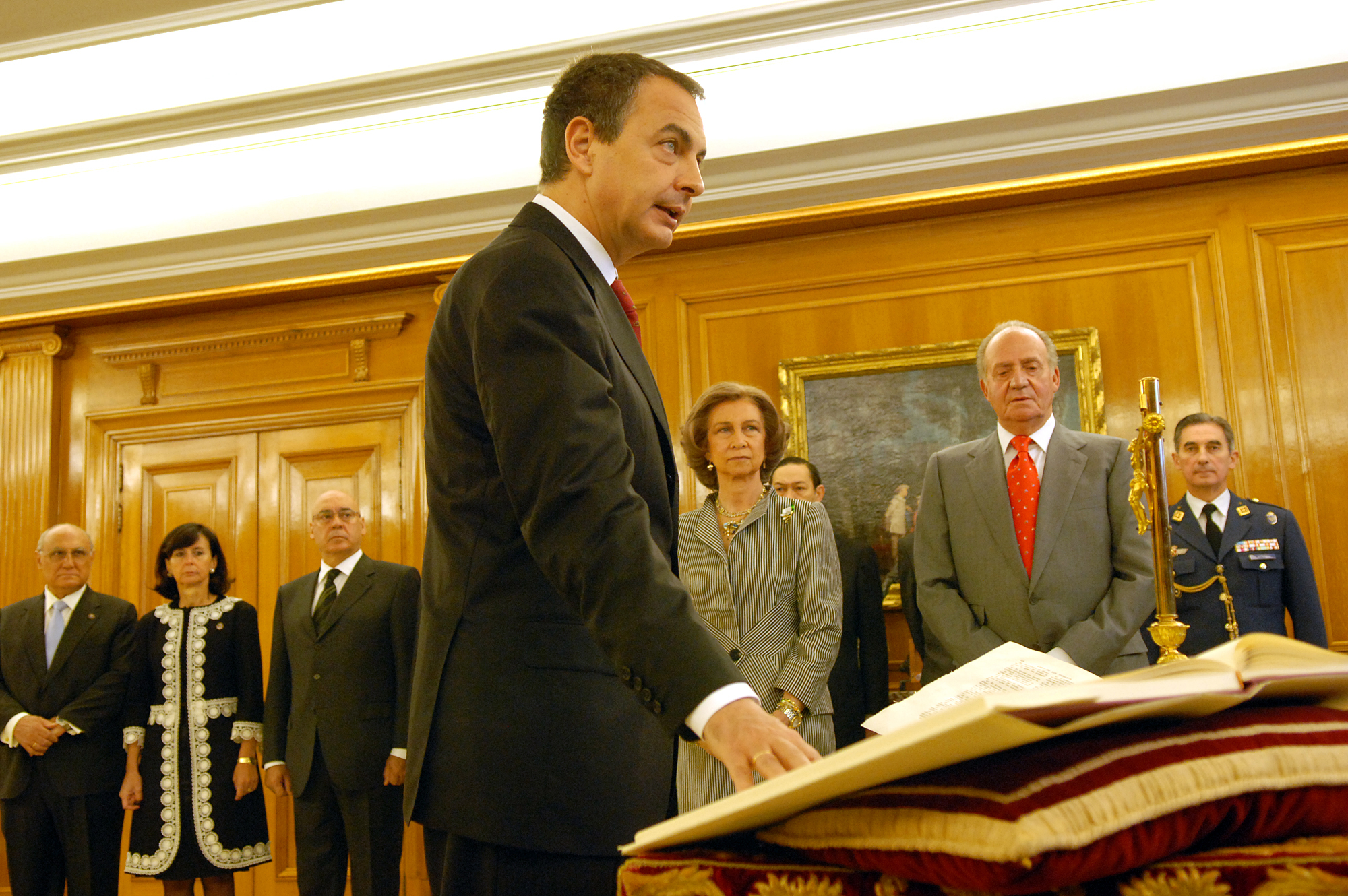
José Luis Rodríguez Zapatero taking the affirmation of office in his second inauguration in 2008. While placing, as mandated, the right hand in the Constitution, being a non-religious, he waived the Bible and the Crucifix.

The traditional links between the political right and the church no longer dictated political preferences; in the 1982 general election, more than half of the country's practicing Catholics voted for the Spanish Socialist Workers' Party. Although the Socialist leadership professed agnosticism, according to surveys between 40 and 45 percent of the party's rank-and-file members held religious beliefs, and more than 70 percent of these professed to be Catholics. Among those entering the party after Franco's death, about half considered themselves Catholic.

One important indicator of the changes taking place in the role of the church was the reduction in the number of Spaniards in Holy Orders. In 1984 the country had more than 22,000 parish priests, nearly 10,000 ordained monks, and nearly 75,000 nuns. These numbers concealed a troubling reality, however. More than 70 percent of the diocesan clergy was between the ages of 35 and 65; the average age of the clergy in 1982 was 49 years. At the upper end of the age range, the low numbers reflected the impact of the Civil War, in which more than 4,000 parish priests died. At the lower end, the scarcity of younger priests reflected the general crisis in vocations throughout the world, which began to be felt in the 1960s. Its effects were felt very acutely in Spain. The crisis was seen in the decline in the number of young men joining the priesthood and in the increase in the number of priests leaving Holy Orders. The number of seminarians in Spain fell from more than 9,000 in the 1950s to only 1,500 in 1979, even though it rose slightly in 1982 to about 1,700. In 2008, there were just 1,221 students in these theological schools.

Changes in the social meaning of religious vocations were perhaps part of the problem; having a priest in the family no longer seemed to spark the kind of pride that family members would have felt in the past. The principal reason in most cases, though, was the church's continued ban on marriage for priests. Previously, the crisis was not particularly serious because of the age distribution of the clergy. As the twentieth century neared an end, however, a serious imbalance appeared between those entering the priesthood and those leaving it. The effects of this crisis were already visible in the decline in the number of parish priests in Spain—from 23,620 in 1979 to just over 22,000 by 1983 and 19,307 in 2005. New ordinations also dropped 19% from 241 in 1998 to 196 in 2008, with all-time record lows of 168 priests out of 45 million Spaniards taking their vows in 2007. The number of nuns shrank 6.9% to 54,160 in the period 2000–2005 as well. On 21 August 2005, Evans David Gliwitzki became the first Catholic priest to get married in Spain.

Another sign of the church's declining role in Spanish life was the diminishing importance of the controversial secular religious institute Opus Dei (Work of God). Opus Dei, a worldwide lay religious body, did not adhere to any particular political philosophy. Its founder, Jose Maria Escriva de Balaguer y Albas, stated that the organization was nonpolitical. The organization was founded in 1928 as a reaction to the increasing secularization of Spain's universities, and higher education continued to be one of the institute's foremost priorities. Despite its public commitment to a nonpolitical stance, Opus Dei members rose to occupy key positions in the Franco régime, especially in the field of economic policy-making in the late 1950s and the early 1960s. Opus Dei members dominated the group of liberal technocrats who engineered the opening of Spain's autarchic economy after 1957. After the 1973 assassination of Prime Minister Luis Carrero Blanco (often rumored to be an Opus Dei member), however, the influence of the institute declined sharply. The secrecy of the order and its activities and the power of its myth helped it maintain its strong position of influence in Spain; but there was little doubt that, compared with the 1950s and the 1960s, Opus Dei had fallen from being one of the country's chief political organizations to being simply one among many such groups competing for power in an open and pluralist society.

=== 21st century ===
An important number of Latin American immigrants, who are usually strong Catholic practitioners, have helped the Catholic Church to recover part of the attendance that regular Masses (Sunday Mass) used to have in the sixties and seventies and that was lost in the eighties among native Spaniards.

Since 2003, the involvement of the Catholic Church in political affairs, through special groups such as Opus Dei, the Neocatechumenal Way or the Legion of Christ, especially personated through important politicians in the right-wing People's Party, has increased again. Old and new media, which are property of the Church, such as the COPE radio network or 13 TV, have also contributed to this new involvement in politics by their own admission. The Church is no longer seen as a neutral and independent institution in political affairs and it is generally aligned with the opinion and politics of the People's Party. This implication has had, as a consequence, a renewed criticism from important sectors of the population (especially the majority of left-wing voters) against the Church and the way in which it is economically sustained by the State. While by 2017-2018 the Church was slowly backpedaling, the damage is potentially long-lasting among the younger generations who had not experienced it personally to such a degree.

The total number of parish priests shrank from 24,300 in 1975 to 18,500 in 2018 when the average age was 65.5 years. The number of nuns dropped by 44.5% to 32,270 between 2000 and 2016; most of them are old. By contrast, some expressions of popular religiosity still thrive, often linked to local festivals, and about 68.5% of the population self-defined themselves as Catholics in 2018, but just 39.8% of them (27.3% of the total population) attend Mass monthly or more often. Despite the arrival of large numbers of Catholic, Orthodox, Muslim and Protestant immigrants, irreligion continues to be the fastest growing demographic as of 2018.

== Attitudes ==
[Asked only to Catholics or believers in another religion] How often do you attend Mass or other religious services, except for those related to ceremonies of social nature, such as weddings, communions or funerals? (April 2026 CIS survey)
1. Never (25.8%)
2. Almost Never (22.7%)
3. Several times a year (23.5%)
4. Two or three times a month (10.0%)
5. Every Sunday and holidays (12.1%)
6. Several times a week (4.50%)
7. Did not answer (1.40%)

While Catholicism is still the largest religion in Spain, most Spaniards—and especially the younger—choose not to follow the Catholic teachings in morals, politics or sexuality, and do not attend Mass regularly. Irreligiosity, including agnosticism and atheism, enjoys social prestige in line with the general secularization and decline of Christianity in Western Europe.

Culture wars in Spain are far more related to politics than religion, and the huge unpopularity of typically religion-related issues like creationism prevent them from being used in such conflicts. Revivalist efforts by the Catholic Church and other creeds have not had any significant success out of their previous sphere of influence. According to the Eurobarometer 83 (2015), only 3% of Spaniards consider religion as one of their three most important values, just like in 2008 and even lower than the 5% European average. And according to the 2005 Eurobarometer Poll:

- 59% of Spaniards responded that "they believe there is a God."
- 21% answered that "they believe there is some sort of spirit or life force".
- 18% answered that "they do not believe there is any sort of spirit, God, or life force."

Evidence of the liberal turn in contemporary Spain can be seen in the widespread support for the legalization of same-sex marriage in Spain—over 70% of Spaniards supported gay marriage in 2004 according to a study by the Centre for Sociological Research. Indeed, in June 2005 a bill was passed by 187 votes to 147 to allow gay marriage, making Spain the third country in the European Union to allow same-sex couples to marry. This vote was split along conservative-liberal lines, with Spanish Socialist Workers' Party (PSOE) and other left-leaning parties supporting the measure and the center-to-right People's Party (PP) against it. However, when the Popular Party came into power in 2011, the law was not revoked or modified.

Changes to the divorce laws to make the process quicker and to eliminate the need for a guilty party have been popular.

Abortion, contraception and emergency contraception are legal and readily available on par with Western European standards. This issue was further evidenced with the passing of the Spanish law on euthanasia, which according to surveys in 2017 and 2018, finds around an 85% of support, and around a 60% of support among practicing religious people, people over 65 years of age or conservative voters.

== Christianity ==
=== Catholicism ===
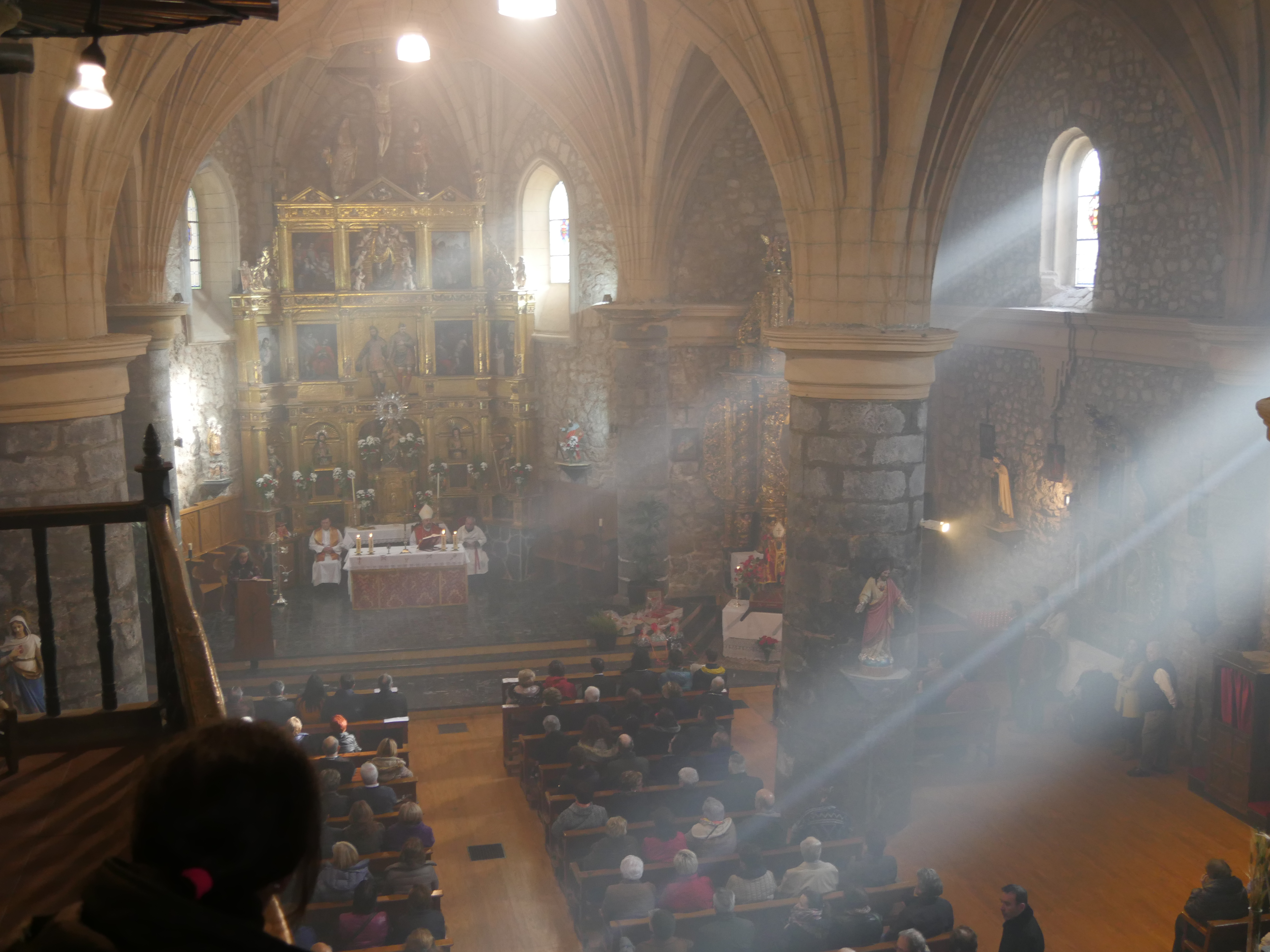
Catholic Mass in Arnedillo

=== Eastern Orthodoxy ===
Spain is not a traditionally Orthodox country. Iberian Christians remained under Rome's sphere of influence in Western Christianity following the Great Schism of 1054.

The number of Orthodox adherents in the country began to increase in the early 1990s, when Spain experienced an influx of immigrants from Eastern Europe. The dominant nationality among Spanish Orthodox adherents is Romanian (as many as 0.7 million people), with Bulgarians, Russians, Ukrainians, Moldovans, and others bringing the total to about 1.0 million.

=== Protestantism ===
Protestantism in Spain has been boosted by immigration, but remains a small testimonial force among native Spaniards (1%). Spain has been seen as a graveyard for foreign missionaries (meaning lack of success) among Evangelical Protestants. Protestant churches claim to have about 1,200,000 members.

== Religious minorities ==
Besides various varieties of Christianity, Islam, Judaism and the non-religious, Spain also has small groups of Hindus, Buddhists, Pagans, Taoists, and Bahá'ís.

=== Islam ===
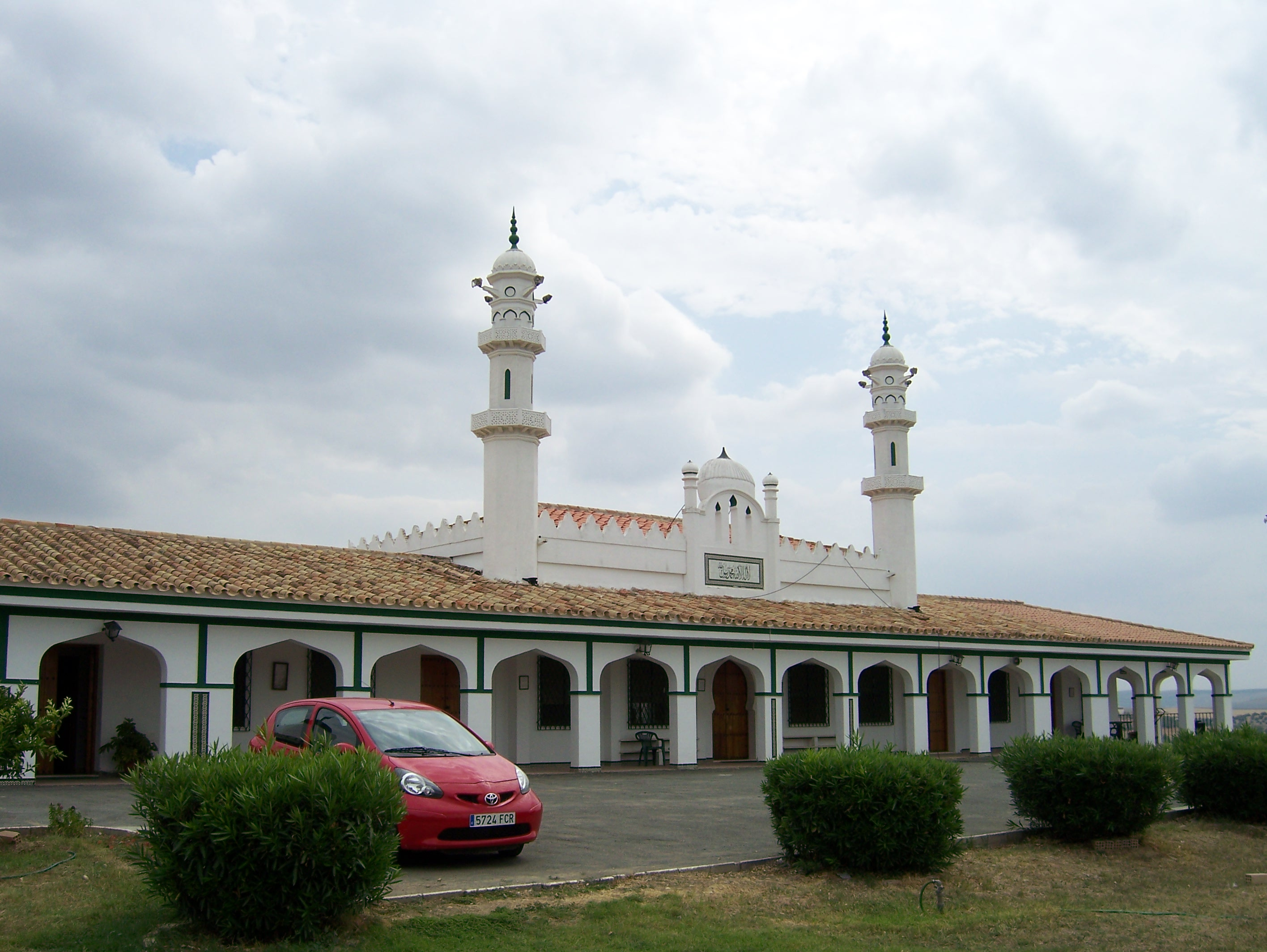
The Basharat Mosque, the first mosque to be built in modern peninsular Spain.

The recent waves of immigration, especially during and after the 2000s, have led to a fast increasing number of Muslims. Nowadays, Islam is the second largest religion, but far behind Christianity (mostly Roman Catholicism) and irreligion.

=== Judaism ===
Jews in Spain form less than 0.2% of the overall population, somewhere between 13,000 and 50,000. They are primarily located in the cities of Barcelona, Madrid, and Málaga. With smaller populations existing in other major urban areas across the country. Most Spanish Jews are Sephardim as opposed to Ashkenazim, and the majority practice Orthodox Judaism. There are Reform organisations in major cities, and a Reform Synagogue in Oviedo.

=== Buddhism ===
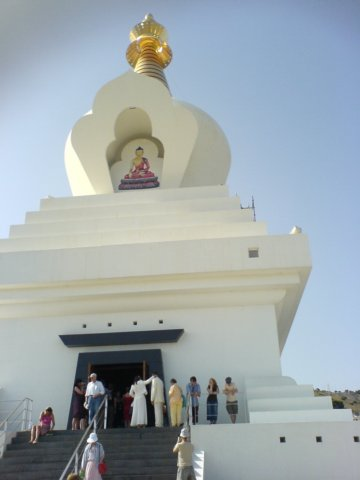
The Buddhist Benalmádena Stupa opened in 2003 in Andalusia is considered the largest in Europe.

Buddhism didn't arrive in Spain until the late 20th century. According to an estimation from 2018, there are around 90,000 followers of Buddhism in Spain and a total number of around 300,000 adherents if sympathizers are included. There are also almost 300 centers for Buddhist practice in the country. However, some of its teachings, like reincarnation or karma, have partially syncretized with the cultural mainstream via New Age-style movements.

=== Taoism ===
Taoism has a presence in Spain, especially in Catalonia. Among Spanish people, it was introduced by the Chinese master Tian Chengyang in the 2000s, leading to the foundation of the Catalan Taoist Association (Asociación de Taoísmo de Cataluña) and the opening of the Temple of Purity and Silence (Templo de la Pureza y el Silencio) in Barcelona, both in 2001. The association has planned to expand the Temple of Purity and Silence as a traditional Chinese Taoist templar complex, the first Taoist temple of this kind in Europe.

A further Taoist temple was opened in 2014 by the Chinese community of Barcelona, led by Taoist priest Liu Zemin, a 21st-generation descendant of poet, soldier and prophet Liu Bo Wen (1311–1375). The temple, located in the district of Sant Martí and inaugurated with the presence of the People's Republic of China consul Qu Chengwu, enshrines 28 deities of the province of China where most of the Chinese in Barcelona come from.

=== Hinduism ===
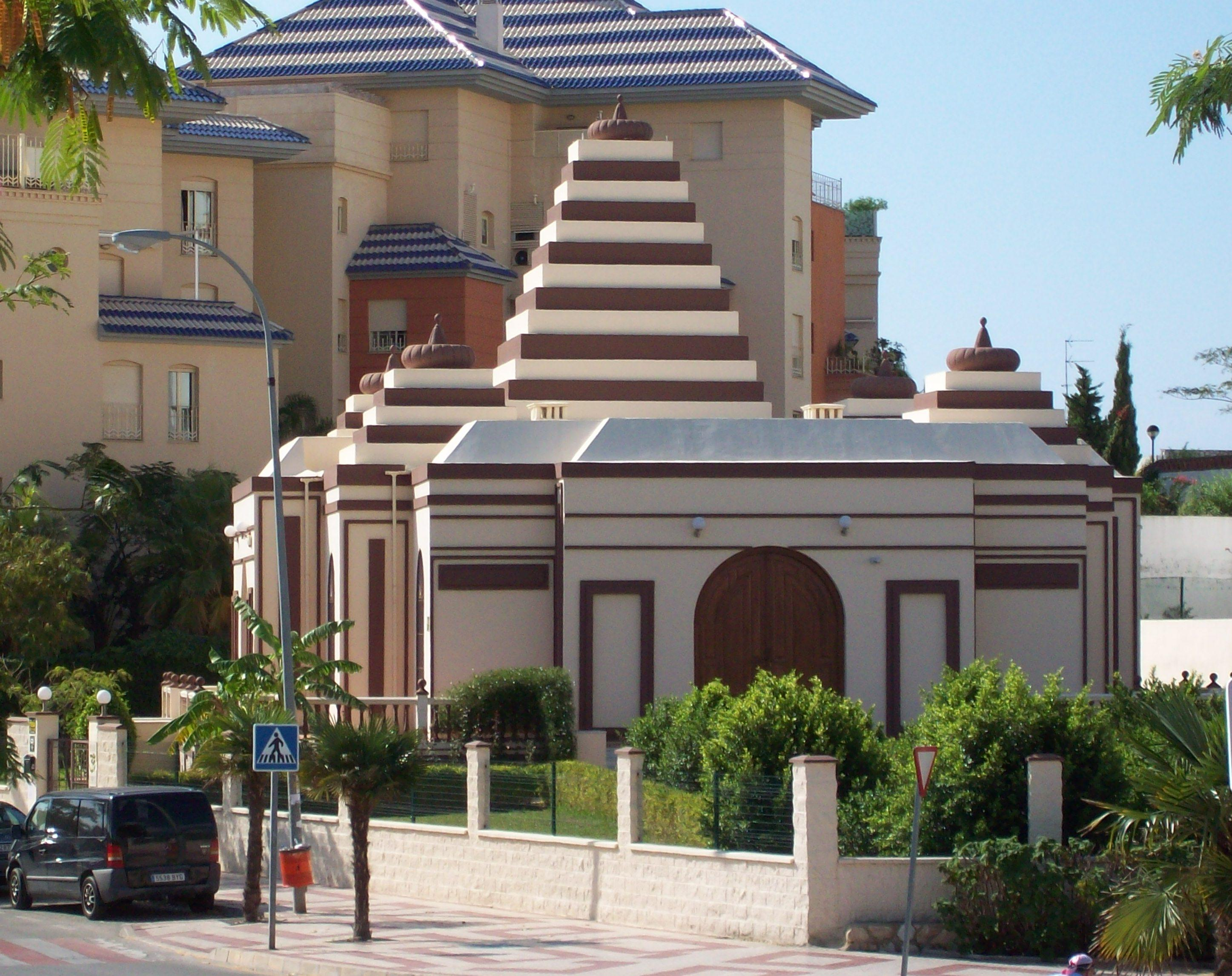
A Hindu temple in Benalmádena, province of Málaga, opened in 2001.

Hinduism first arrived in Spain by Sindhi immigrants through British colony of Gibraltar in the early 20th century. Estimates for the number of Hindus in Spain range from 40,000 for 2016 to 75,000 as of 2024. Another estimate for 2014 is that about 25,000 of 40,000 Hindus come from India, 5,000 from Eastern Europe and Latin America and 10,000 are Spanish Hindus; there are also small communities of Hindus from Nepal (around 200), from Bangladesh (around 500) and from Pakistan.

There are also about 40 Hindu temples/worship-places in Spain. The first Hindu temple in Ceuta city was completed in 2007. There are ISKCON Krishna Temples in Barcelona, Madrid, Malaga, Tenerife and Brihuega along with a Krishna restaurant in Barcelona. Some of Hinduism's shared teaching with Buddhism like reincarnation or karma, have partially syncretized with the cultural mainstream via New Age-style movements.

=== Paganism ===
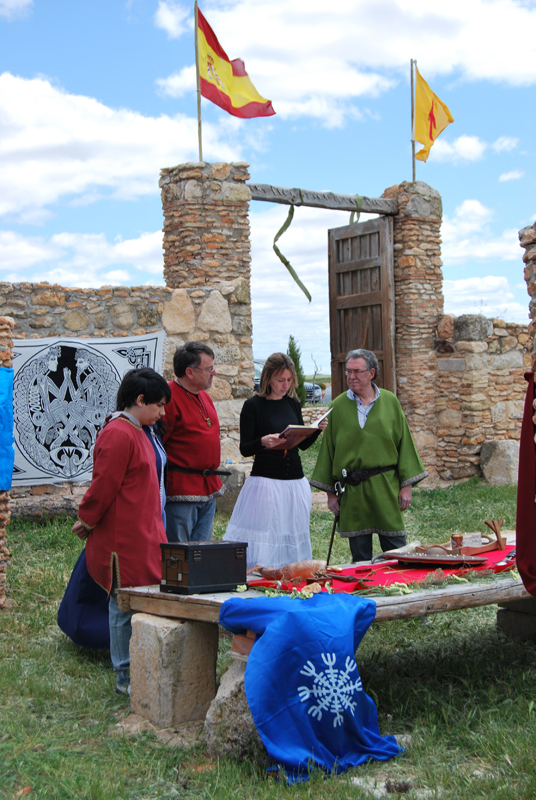
Heathen wedding at the temple of the OCSA in Albacete.

Paganism draws a minority in Spain. The most visible pagan religions are forms of Germanic Heathenism (Spanish: Etenismo), Celtic paganism (and Druidry) and Wicca.

Spanish Heathen groups include the Odinist Community of Spain–Ásatrú, which identifies as both Odinist and Ásatrú, the Asatru Lore Vanatru Assembly, the Gotland Forn Sed and Circulo Asatrú Tradición Hispánica, of which four, the first one is officially registered by the State; Celtist or Druidic groups include the Dun Ailline Druid Brotherhood (Hermandad Druida Dun Ailline) and the Fintan Druidic Order, both registered. Amongst the Wiccan groups, two have been granted official registration: the Spanish Wiccan Association (Asociación Wicca España) and the Celtiberian Wicca (Wicca Tradición Celtíbera).

Galicia is a center of Druidry (Galician: Druidaria) owing to a claim to a strong Celtic heritage; the Pan-Galician Druidic Order (Irmandade Druídica Galaica) is specific to Galicia. In the Basque Country, traditional Basque Gentility (Basque: Jentiltasuna) and Sorginkery (Sorginkeria), Basque witchcraft, have been revived and have ties with Basque nationalism. Sorginkoba Elkartea is a Basque Neopagan organisation active in the Basque countries.

== Irreligion and atheism ==
Irreligion in Spain is a phenomenon that exists at least since the 17th century. Atheism, Agnosticism, Deism and freethinking became relatively popular (although the majority of the society was still very religious) in the late 19th and early 20th centuries. During the Spanish Civil War irreligious people were repressed by the Francoist side, while religion was largely abolished among the republicans. During the Francoist dictatorship period (1939–1975) irreligion was not tolerated, following the national-catholic ideology of the regime. Irreligious people could not be public workers or express their thoughts openly. After the Spanish democratic transition (1975–1982), restrictions on irreligion were lifted. In the last decades religious practice has fallen dramatically and atheism and agnosticism have grown in popularity, with over 14 million people (30.3% of the population as of January 2020) having no religion. The number of irreligious people in Spain follows an increasing trend, with more than 41% of the population being declared as irreligious as of April 2026.

== Popular religion ==
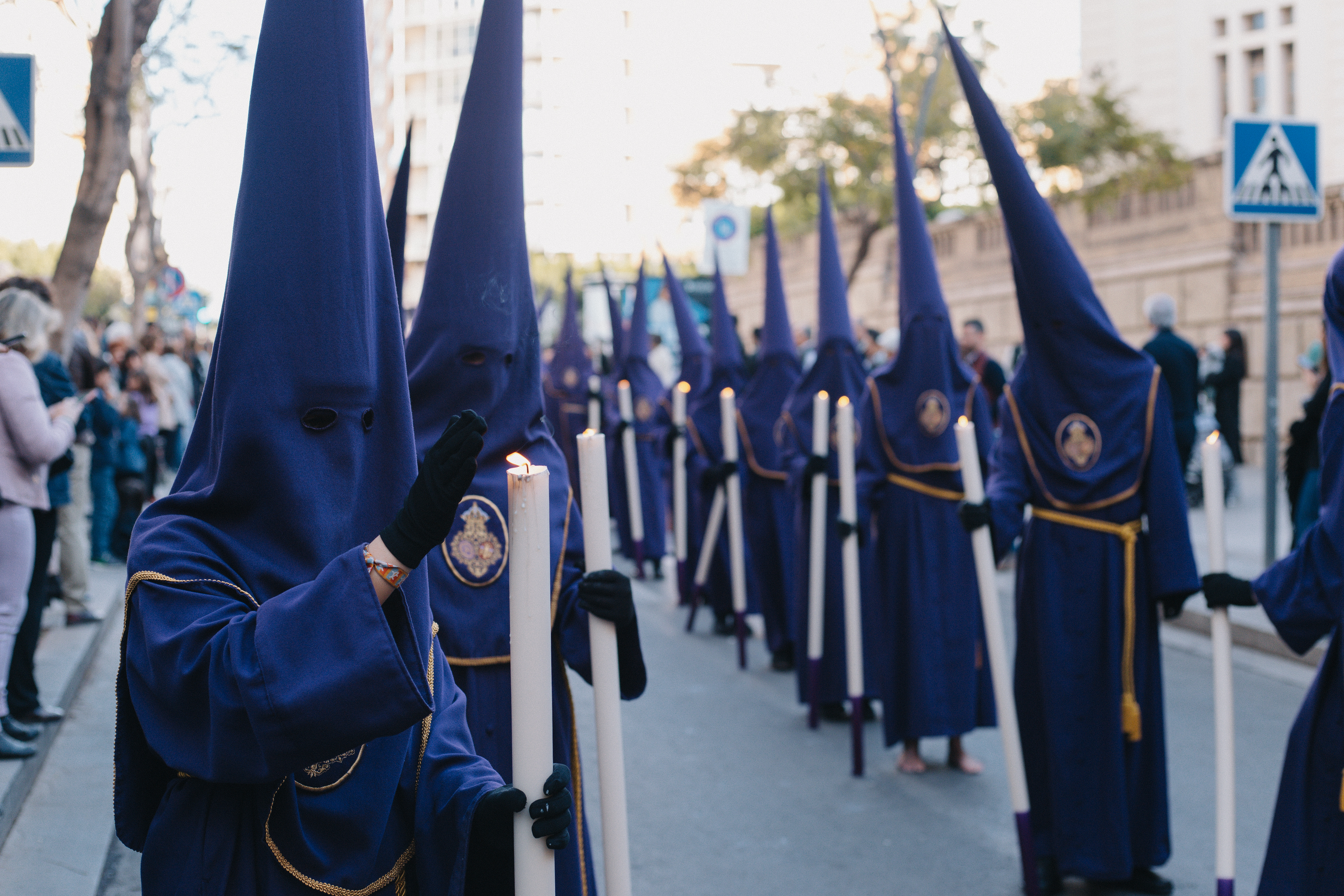
Procession of a Brotherhood during Easter in Almeria, Spain.

However, some expressions of popular religiosity still thrive, often linked to Christian festivals and local patron saints. World-famous examples include the Holy Week in Seville, the Romería de El Rocío in Huelva or the Mystery Play of Elche, while the Sanfermines in Pamplona and the Falles of Valencia have mostly lost their original religious nature. The continuing success of these festivals is the result of a mix of religious, cultural, social and economic factors including sincere devotion, local or family traditions, non-religious fiesta and partying, perceived beauty, cultural significance, territorial identity, meeting friends and relatives, increased sales and a massive influx of tourists to the largest ones.

The Pilgrimage to Santiago de Compostela is not so popular among Spaniards, but it attracts hundreds of thousands pilgrims and tourists yearly. The destination of most is Santiago's baroque cathedral, where believers can visit what is said to be the tomb of James, the apostle, who, according to Catholic tradition, brought Christianity to Spain and Portugal. In 2019 alone, before the COVID-19 pandemic, 350,000 people from all over the world walked "El Camino." In 2020, only 50,000 could make the walk or "sacred route" because of the pandemic. Most if not all cities and towns celebrate a patron saint's festival, no matter how small or known, which often includes processions, Mass and the like but whose actual religious following is variable and sometimes merely nominal.

Another trend among Spanish believers is syncretism, often defined as religión a la carta. In religion à la carte, people mix popular Roman Catholic beliefs and traditions with their own worldview and/or esoteric, self-help, New Age or philosophical borrowings they like, resulting in a unique personal 'soft' spirituality without any possible church sanction or endorsement. These people typically self-define themselves as Catholics, but they only attend church for christenings, funerals or weddings and are not orthodox followers. Although the term (non-orthodox) and concept find an analogue in the notion of "Cafeteria Catholicism", it is still very hard to pin down what one means by Catholic identity vis a vis orthodoxy today. According to emeritus Pope Benedict XVI, neither statistics nor orthodoxy are the sole measures of "authentic" Catholic identity. Possibly Bishop John Stowe of Lexington, Kentucky (USA), put it best to justify the quest and search among many Catholics, especially in the area of sexuality and spirituality: "...Catholicism cannot be reduced to a morality clause."

== Specific beliefs ==
A 2008 poll by the Obradoiro de Socioloxia yielded the following results:

Beliefs of Spaniards, 2008 (percentage)
	Sex		Age				Education			Religion			Total			
Belief	Male	Female	18–29	30–44	45–59	60+	Elementary school	High school	College & higher	Practicing Catholic	Non-practicing Catholic	No religion	Yes	No	Unsure	N/A
	% answering Yes:												Total percentage:			
Existence of God	45	61	45	50	49	68	61	48	47	89	54	0	53	23	23	1
Divine creation ex nihilo	26	42	26	28	30	51	43	29	26	68	26	3	34	47	17	2
Adam and Eve	21	37	20	25	23	40	22	19	23	58	24	2	29	53	17	1
Historicity of Jesus	70	76	63	65	71	80	70	77	72	94	68	65	73	13	13	1
Jesus son of God	40	54	38	41	45	63	57	41	39	85	46	0	47	25	23	2
Virgin birth of Jesus	35	46	26	35	37	63	55	31	29	81	35	0	41	41	16	2
Three wise men visited Jesus	40	51	37	43	45	56	52	42	38	71	47	11	45	35	18	2
Resurrection of Jesus	35	50	32	38	36	63	52	37	33	83	38	0	43	38	17	2
Miracles	35	46	40	42	36	44	42	43	35	67	36	14	41	44	14	1
Afterlife	30	50	34	41	33	52	45	33	41	72	34	14	41	36	22	1
Reincarnation	12	17	23	18	10	7	14	15	14	16	16	8	14	68	16	2
Communication with the dead	13	15	24	19	9	5	12	18	12	13	17	8	14	72	13	1
Heaven	30	43	32	33	27	53	44	35	28	71	31	2	37	48	14	1
Hell	24	30	27	26	19	35	20	29	20	49	24	0	27	56	15	1
Angels	25	39	26	32	27	42	36	30	28	n/d	n/d	n/d	32	52	15	1
The Devil	24	35	27	29	21	39	35	28	23	55	26	3	29	56	13	1
Malevolent sorcery	14	23	20	21	21	13	19	22	14	22	19	9	19	70	10	1
Evil eye	19	24	27	23	22	13	24	26	11	24	25	9	21	69	8	1
Divination of the future	14	16	20	18	15	8	14	20	10	14	16	10	15	72	12	1
Astrology	21	27	30	23	23	21	28	22	20	25	26	18	24	63	11	2
UFOs	25	22	28	32	20	13	19	26	27	19	25	23	23	61	14	1

== Regional data ==
Large studies carried out by the Center for Sociological Research (Centro de Investigaciones Sociológicas) in September–October 2012 and September–October 2019 discovered information relating to the rates of religious self-identification across Spain's various autonomous communities. A study carried out by the same institution in October 2019 showed that the percentage of Catholics has decreased overall, from 72.9% to 68.3%, in a period of seven years.

Religion by Spanish autonomous communities (%)
Region	Catholic Practicing and non-practicing		Other		Unaffiliated (Atheism/Agnosticism)		Unanswered		References
Region	2012	2019	2012	2019	2012	2019	2012	2019	References
(Region of Murcia) Murcia	85.0	80.1	0.8	2.1	13.9	17.9	0.3	0	
Extremadura	81.2	80.1	1.0	1.7	17	18	0.7	0.3	
(Galicia (Spain)) Galicia	82.2	77.7	0.5	1.2	16.6	19.4	0.7	1.7	
(Aragon) Aragón	82.4	77.3	1.2	2.3	15.2	16.6	1.2	4.0	
Castile and León	79.4	76.8	1.8	1.7	17.1	20.3	1.8	1.3	
Canary Islands	84.9	76.7	1.7	2.8	12.3	20.2	1.0	0.3	
Andalusia	78.8	76.5	1.8	1.8	18.6	21.2	0.8	0.5	
La Rioja	74.0	74.6	2.6	1.1	23.2	22.9	0.3	1.4	
(Castilla–La Mancha) Castilla-La Mancha	81.1	74.0	2.1	2	15.2	23.3	1.6	0.8	
Kingdom of Spain	72.9	68.3	2.3	3.2	23.0	25.4	1.7	1.2	
Cantabria	74.3	68.0	2.0	0.7	21.8	29	2.0	2.3	
(Valencian Community) Valencia	75.0	66.3	2.7	2.2	21.3	30.5	0.9	1.1	
Asturias	76.5	65.2	0.5	3.3	21.5	30.8	1.5	0.8	
Melilla	46.3	65.0	37.5	20	12.1	15.0	4.3	0	
(Community of Madrid) Madrid	62.9	61.9	3.8	4.6	28.4	31.8	4.9	1.7	
Ceuta	68.0	60.0	28.3	36.7	3.3	3.4	0.5	0	
(Basque Country (autonomous community)) Basque Country	58.6	59.9	1.9	1.5	36.9	36.7	2.5	0.9	
Balearic Islands	68.7	59.3	1.8	4.3	28.0	33.7	1.5	2.8	
Navarre	65.7	56.3	0.3	2.4	32.6	41.0	1.5	0.3	
Catalonia	60.7	54.1	3.2	3.2	34.2	41.0	1.9	1.7	

== See also ==
- Spanish society after the democratic transition
- Religion in France
- Religion in Portugal
- Christianity in Spain
  - Roman Catholicism in Spain
    - Opus Dei in Spain
    - Palmarian Church
  - Protestantism in Spain
    - Anglicanism in Spain
  - Eastern Orthodoxy in Spain
- Islam in Spain
  - Ahmadiyya in Spain
- Judaism in Spain
- Irreligion in Spain
- Bahá'í Faith in Spain
- Buddhism in Spain
- Hinduism in Spain
