= Baháʼí Faith in Spain =

The Baháʼí Faith in Spain begins with coverage of events in the history of the Bábí religion in the 1850s. The first mention of Spain in Baháʼí literature was ʻAbdu'l-Bahá mentioning it as a place to take the religion to in 1916. The first Baháʼí to visit Spain was in 1930 and the first pioneer to stay was Virginia Orbison in January 1947. Following some conversions to the religion the first Baháʼí Local Spiritual Assembly of Madrid was elected in 1948. As of 1959 there were 28 Baháʼís registered in Spain. Following the spread of the religion the first National Spiritual Assembly was elected in 1962. Following the election the breadth of initiatives of the community increased privately until 1968 when the national assembly was able to register as a Non-Catholic Religious Association in the Ministry of Justice and the Ministry of Information and Tourism allowing public religious events and publication and importation of religious materials. Following this the diversity of initiatives of the community significantly expanded. Baháʼís began operating a permanent Baháʼí school and in 1970 the first Spanish Roma joined the religion. In 1981 the Baháʼís held a separate school in the north central region of Spain to which over 100 people form 26 communities attended and the Spiritual Assembly of Mallorca held several month long classes (mostly for non-Baháʼís) in computer usage in 1985. Fifty years after the first local assembly there were 100 assemblies. The Association of Religion Data Archives (relying on World Christian Encyclopedia) estimated some 13300 Baháʼís in 2005. In 2008 the Universal House of Justice picked the Spanish community to host a regional conference for the Iberian peninsula and beyond.

== Early phase ==
There were more than 160 references to the Bábí and Baháʼí religions in the Spanish daily press, books, periodicals and manuscripts from the founding of the religions in 1844 to 1947. The earliest press articles found were published in 1850 and announce the news of the Zanjan upheaval (Madrid October 24) and the Execution of the Báb (Barcelona and Madrid on different days of November). Most of the books found are translations of foreign authors or reference works like dictionaries, encyclopedias or manuals but there are some contributions made by Spanish authors. See also first contact between the Netherlands and the Bábí and Baháʼí faiths.

=== ʻAbdu'l-Bahá's Tablets of the Divine Plan ===
In the history of the Baháʼí Faith the first mentions of Spain start in the twentieth century. ʻAbdu'l-Bahá, the son of the founder of the religion, wrote a series of letters, or tablets, to the followers of the religion in the United States in 1916–1917; these letters were compiled together in the book titled Tablets of the Divine Plan. The seventh of the tablets was the first to mention several countries in Europe including beyond where ʻAbdu'l-Bahá had visited in 1911–12. Written on April 11, 1916, it was delayed in being presented in the United States until 1919 — after the end of World War I and the Spanish flu. The seventh tablet was translated and presented by Mirza Ahmad Sohrab on April 4, 1919, and published in Star of the West magazine on December 12, 1919.

"In brief, this world-consuming war has set such a conflagration to the hearts that no word can describe it. In all the countries of the world the longing for universal peace is taking possession of the consciousness of men. There is not a soul who does not yearn for concord and peace. A most wonderful state of receptivity is being realized.… Therefore, O ye believers of God! Show ye an effort and after this war spread ye the synopsis of the divine teachings in the British Isles, France, Germany, Austria-Hungary, Russia, Italy, Spain, Belgium, Switzerland, Norway, Sweden, Denmark, Holland, Portugal, Rumania, Serbia, Montenegro, Bulgaria, Greece, Andorra, Liechtenstein, Luxembourg, Monaco, San Marino, Balearic Isles, Corsica, Sardinia, Sicily, Crete, Malta, Iceland, Faroe Islands, Shetland Islands, Hebrides and Orkney Islands."

== Establishment of the community ==
Leonora Armstrong was an American pioneer living in Brazil when she saw to a translation into Spanish. She decided to go to Madrid to study the Spanish language because Shoghi Effendi, then head of the religion, wanted Spanish literature and she wanted to become proficient in the language. In July 1930 she boarded a French ship which first took her to several ports of call in West Africa and then to Barcelona. From Barcelona she proceeded to Madrid where she intended to take university courses. However she soon fell seriously ill with Scarlet fever for a time and was unable to take courses at a university of Madrid. When she recovered she went on Baháʼí pilgrimage and afterwards focused her efforts in Latin and South America.

In September 1942 Baháʼí Virginia Orbison pioneered for the first time when she arrived in Santiago, Chile, from the United States to carry on the work begun by Marcia Atwater. See Baháʼí Faith in Chile. After a few years she returned to the US briefly before moving south again -this time to Brazil where she met Leonora Armstrong and reviewed the translation Armstrong had contracted. Starting in 1946, following World War II, Shoghi Effendi drew up plans for the American (US and Canada) Baháʼí community to send pioneers to Europe including Spain; the Baháʼís set up a European Teaching Committee chaired by Edna True. Orbison was the first pioneer under the European Committee to reach Spain in January 1947. The second pioneer to Spain was Eduardo Gonzales in June 1947 and stayed until March 1948. Orbison describes conditions early on - "You had to know someone well before you'd dare mention the Faith." Nevertheless, a young bank employee had carried on correspondence about Esperanto with a friend of Orbison's in the United States and they were able to meet and discuss the religion. Orbison mentioned that a universal auxiliary language was a Baháʼí teaching. He and a friend returned the next day and both soon joined the religion. Other early contacts were afraid to be associated with the religion. By June 1947 there is mention of the first two converts. In 1948 the first Baháʼí Local Spiritual Assembly of Madrid was formed. Dorothy Beecher Baker, a prominent Baháʼí and member of the committee, visited the Baháʼís in Spain among other European countries in 1948 and again in 1951 when she was appointed as a Hand of the Cause. By June 1949 there were two assemblies in Spain when Orbison, Marion Little, and a Spaniard Baháʼí traveled to Barcelona to meet Baháʼís there. By April 1950 Else Horneman had joined Orbison in Spain.

== Growth ==
=== Towards a national organization ===
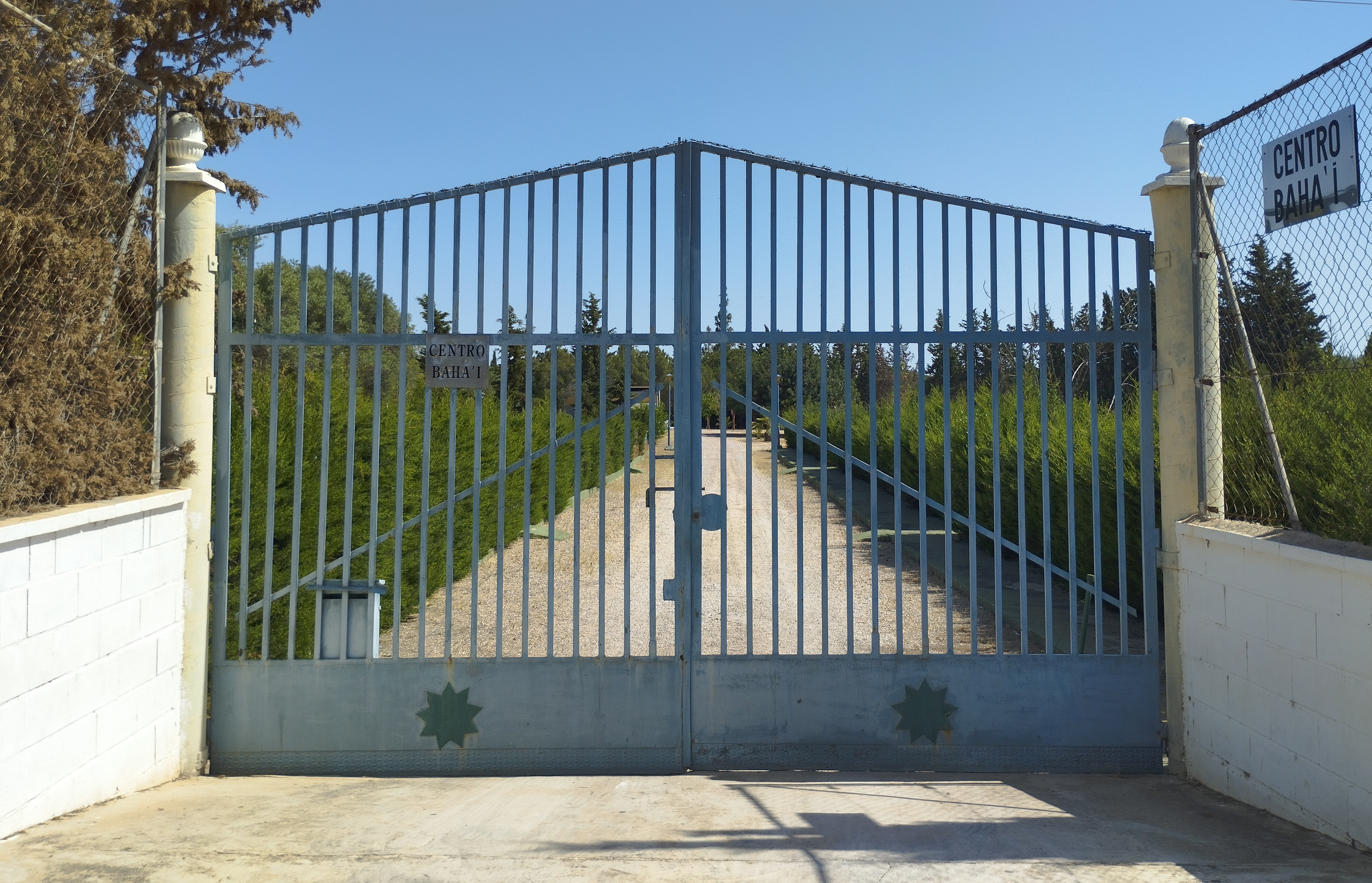
Entrance of the Baháʼí Center of Cartagena, active since at least 1971. The local Baháʼí community was formally established on April 21, 1956, with the founding of the Local Spiritual Assembly of Cartagena, one of the first in Spain.

In September 1951 the first Iberian conference took place with nine native Baháʼís and other pioneers who had attended the Fourth European Teaching Conference – recommendations from the consultation included exchanging updated information and further coordination between the communities, and to send contributions for the final work on the Shrine of the Báb. In 1953 a large meeting was held by the Spaniards in Barcelona which Orbison attended. According to Orbison's recollection many years later the next morning the police investigated the meeting and the women staying in the apartment were arrested on investigation that they were communists. All the Baháʼís of Barcelona were then gathered and questioned. The fact of converting one communist to a religion believing in God, and affirmations of Baháʼí teachings of obedience to government, may have played a role in relaxing the fears of the police. Regardless all were released. In October 1953 Americans pioneers Gertrude Eisenberg and Tenerife True pioneered to the Canary Islands and in June 1954 a young Persian, Shoghi Riaz Rouhani, also moved there.

In 1955 the first native Canarians joined the religion and in April the first assemblies of the Canaries were elected simultaneously in the cities of Santa Cruz de Tenerife and Las Palmas de Gran Canaria. By 1955 there was an assembly in Murcia and Alicante in 1956.

By April 1955 the first Baháʼí Local Spiritual Assembly of Ceuta was elected.

A regional national assembly was elected for the Iberian peninsula from 1957 to 1962. The 1957 convention was witnessed by Charles Wolcott as a representative of Shoghi Effendi.

Born, raised, and married in Iran, Rúhu'lláh Furúghí moved to Spain in October 1958 with his wife and five children (the youngest, one year of age, the eldest fifteen). They had no knowledge of the language nor of the circumstances in their chosen goal. After spending nine months in Barcelona he moved with his family to Mallorca to assist with the formation of its first local assembly. Three years later the family pioneered once more, this time to Granada where there had been no Baháʼís.

Guy Murchie is Baháʼí and former staff writer for the Chicago Sunday Tribune and author of several books. For a time around 1958 he was living in Málaga. As of 1959 there were 28 Baháʼís registered in Spain. In May 1959 the first Baháʼí marriage was registered with the government as a civil ceremony.

The National Assembly of the Baháʼís of Spain was first elected in 1962 with attendance by Hand of the Cause Paul Haney. Its first members were: Antonio Jimenez, Luis Ortuno, Francisco Salas, Jose Lopez Monge, Ruhollah Mehrabhkani, Carlos Chias, Ramon Escartin, Isidro Torrella, and Charles Ioas.

In 1963 statistics on the community counted as follows:

Assemblies
| Alicante | Barcelona | Ceuta | Cartagena | L'Hospitalet de Llobregat | Las Palmas de Gran Canaria | Madrid | |
| Montgat | Murcia | Sabadell | Santa Cruz de Tenerife | Terrassa | Valencia | | |
Smaller Groups of Baháʼís
| Abanilla | Badalona | Cheste | Granada | Barberà del Vallès | Teresa de Cofrentes | | |
Isolated Baháʼís
| Béjar | Cornellà de Llobregat | Ferrol | Jaén | Linares | Málaga | Sant Joan Despí | Vilanova i la Geltrú |

=== Since forming a national community ===
In 1964 Hand of the Cause John Ferraby visited Baháʼís of Murcia. Later a regional conference was held in Cartagena, in the south of Spain, to discuss the progress of the religion in Spain. The first assembly of Granada and Barberà del Vallès in Catalonia was elected in 1965. The first national youth school was held in Valencia during July 1966 with about 60 youth attending giving several public talks. It was followed by a school in December in Murcia. In 1967 Hand of the Cause Paul Haney made a return trip through Spain. The English language weekly newspaper Guidepostof February 16, 1968 mentions the coming of Charles Ioas from Illinois in 1953 as a pioneer. The article mentions details of his work in Madrid as well as his activities in teaching and administration for the religion. In 1970 the first Spanish Roma, Maria Camacho Martinez, joined the religion in Sabadell. In 1972 assembly of the Baháʼís of Santa Cruz de La Palma was elected and one year later the Arucas and La Laguna assemblies were elected on the Canaries. In 1975 Furúghí was elected a member of the National Spiritual Assembly of Spain. He led a group of Baháʼí youth on a teaching trip of several weeks' duration in Ireland and travelled thousands of kilometres across Spain giving public talks and carrying out different tasks in service to the religion. During the last two years of his life he served as the treasurer of the national assembly. In 1976 Iranian Baháʼí entertainer Ahdieh, who had appeared on Iranian radio & television, decided to move to Spain as a pioneer. Leaving Iran at the age of 25, she continued to build her musical career and has since performed widely at Baháʼí events. A regional conference on the growth of the religion in Spain in 1977 had weeks of public events in the region including a visit from Virginia Orbison, officially declared a Knight of Baháʼu'lláh for Spain. In April 1984, an autonomous Spiritual Assembly of the Baháʼís of the Canary Islands was elected. By 1988 two assemblies were composed mostly of Roma. In 1988 the national assembly held its first international youth conference- attendees came from Canada, the Canary Islands, Crete, the Netherlands, Italy, Northern Ireland, Puerto Rico, Spain and the United States. Madrid hosted the 1989 regional European youth conference of Baháʼís which gathered some 700 attendees from 26 countries and members of three national assemblies.

==== Baháʼí Schools ====
In August 1968 the national assembly purchased land for a permanent Baháʼí school. The inaugural summer school, with Hand of the Cause Dr. Rahmatu'lláh Muhájir, in Liria in August 1971 with attendees from 19 communities. In July 1975 Hand of the Cause of God Ugo Giachery gave a talk at the school. In winter 1976 there was a viewing of The Green Light Expeditiondocumenting Hand of the Cause Rúhíyyih Khanum's trip up the Amazon River and into the high mountain ranges of Peru and Bolivia. The 1977 session of the school held sessions for children, youth and adults which attracted 227 people including 30 non-Baháʼís, and 35 children. In 1981 the Baháʼís held a second school in the north central region of Spain to which over 100 people form 26 communities attended. In 1983 some 200 Baháʼís from 45 communities gathered for a spiritualization conference at the national school. In 1984 Continental Counselor Mas'úd Khamsí toured among the communities of Baháʼís and gave public interviews and met with institutions of the religion. The Spiritual Assembly of Mallorca held several month long classes (mostly for non-Baháʼís) in computer usage in two cities on the island in 1985. In 1986 Baháʼís in Terrassa and Cartagena held weekend institutes on the subject of the equality of women and men - a core Baháʼí teaching. In 1987 some 170 Persian speaking Baháʼís gathered at the national school -the keynote talk was given by Adib Taherzadeh.

==== Multiplying interests ====
In July 1968 that the national assembly received registry number 2 in the Register of Non-Catholic Religious Associations in the Ministry of Justice. This recognition of the National Spiritual Assembly carries with it the automatic legal recognition of all Local Spiritual Assemblies duly formed in accordance with the Statutes of the National Spiritual Assembly after various government levels and to the Supreme Court denied options. In December 1966 a new basic law of the land was approved by national referendum, and one provision of the new law provided for government protection of all religions. To implement this new concept, a Law on Religious Liberty was passed by the national Parliament on June 28, 1967. At the same time the religion was registered in the Ministry of Information and Tourism thus permitting the publication of Baháʼí literature in Spain, as well as the importation and distribution of religious materials from outside the country. Following the registrations it was possible to hold public meetings for the first time and to present the religion a number of venues and several articles on the Faith were published in Catalonia, the Balearic and Canary Islands and elsewhere. Radio program broadcast mention of the religion for the first time. The national assembly initiated the Baháʼí News Bulletin internally while externally a number of articles were published by various journalists.

In 1972 an observance of Human Rights Day was sponsored by the Baháʼís of Barcelona with some 200 persons attending. The guest speaker's talk was entitled "Equality of Rights and Opportunities, Especially Regarding Women" while Baháʼí Professor Mehrabkhani presented "The Spiritual Source of Human Rights." The event was held again in 1973 and the Baháʼís of Tarrasa held its first. In 1974 the first televised broadcast mentioning the religion was aired with interviews of Baháʼís and the Baháʼís organized their first institute on children. In 1979 radio coverage of the religion expanded with a variety of programs including some regular programs.

In 1979 the Baháʼí community of Palma Majorca was among nine religious groups asked to participate in a round table discussion sponsored by an ecumenical organization. The Baháʼís suggested that a group be formed to help teachers include spiritual education, without proselytizing, in the regular school curricula. The Baháʼís were then asked to develop the idea and present a plan of action at a later meeting. Monthly meetings presided over by a priest were held at the Baháʼí center to work on the project. In 1980 the national assembly began to publish "Pensamiento Baha'i" (Baha'i Thought), in bi-monthly form.

== Modern community ==
Since its inception the religion has had involvement in socio-economic development beginning by giving greater freedom to women, promulgating the promotion of female education as a priority concern, and that involvement was given practical expression by creating schools, agricultural coops, and clinics. The religion entered a new phase of activity when a message of the Universal House of Justice dated 20 October 1983 was released. Baháʼís were urged to seek out ways, compatible with the Baháʼí teachings, in which they could become involved in the social and economic development of the communities in which they lived. Worldwide in 1979 there were 129 officially recognized Baháʼí socio-economic development projects. By 1987, the number of officially recognized development projects had increased to 1482.

In the Canaries in 1990 European youth gathered in Gran Canaria some of whom went on to form "Art Sano," in 1998 and performed around the island. Baháʼís were present in the University of La Laguna since the late eighties and officially formed the University Baháʼí Club began to 1993. In November 1992 seventy-two Baháʼís from the Canaries participated in the second Baháʼí World Congress. In 1994 the Baháʼís of the Canaries formed the Baháʼí Association of Women.

Regional conferences were called for by the Universal House of Justice in October 2008 and one was held for the Iberian peninsula 24–25 January 2009 to celebrate recent achievements in grassroots community-building and to plan their next steps in organizing in their home areas. More than 1,000 Baháʼís from Spain, 140 from Portugal, and 135 from the Canary Islands attended. In addition, two Bahaʼis came from the principality of Andorra in the Pyrenees Mountains, and nine from the Spanish city of Melilla in North Africa. Other people came from Europe, the Americas, Africa, and Asia to share in the gathering.

=== Spanish Government statements ===
In 2000 Spain rose in support of a resolution about concern over the Baháʼís in Iran as well as taking steps to further document conditions. In 2006, all party groups backed a motion in the Foreign Affairs Parliamentary Committee calling on the Iranian government to respect the rights of the Baháʼís in Iran. This motion was unanimously approved by all parties represented in that Committee and passed by the Spanish House of Representatives. In 2009, a similar motion was introduced by a member of the conservative People's Party, Juan Carlos Grau, within the Foreign Affairs Parliamentary Committee, which was once again unanimously approved by all parties and passed by the Spanish House of Representatives asking the Spanish government to call for the release of the seven (7) Bahaʼi leaders [formerly known as the Yaran, or "Friends"] in Iran and to condemn the systematic persecution of the Bahaʼis. It also condemns the human rights violations committed by the Islamic Republic of Iran. See Persecution of Baháʼís.

=== Demographics ===
The Association of Religion Data Archives (relying on World Christian Encyclopedia) estimated some 13300 Baháʼís in 2005. As of 2007 Baháʼís established in all the Canary islands spread among about fifty municipalities.

== See also ==
- History of Spain
- Religion in Spain
