= Evans David Gliwitzki =

Evans David Gliwitzki is the first Spanish Catholic priest to be married. He was ordained on 21 August 2005 in La Laguna, Tenerife. The ordination was performed by Felipe Fernández García, the Bishop of San Cristóbal de La Laguna and Ávila.

== Life ==
Gliwitzki was born in Zimbabwe and was ordained an Anglican minister in 1984. His ordination as a Roman Catholic priest in 2005 had the full support of the Catholic Church as a special case for unity between churches, and does not signal a change in Catholic policy towards priestly celibacy. Such cases have also occurred in Britain and the United States, but this was a first for Spain.

Gliwitzki and his wife have two daughters.
