= Irreligion in Spain =

Religious self-definition in Spain (CIS survey; sample size: 3,935; February 2023)
1. Practicing Catholic (18.5%)
2. Non-Practicing Catholic (37.5%)
3. Believer in another religion (2.70%)
4. Agnostic (12.6%)
5. Indifferent/Non-believer (12.3%)
6. Atheist (14.9%)
7. Did not answer (1.50%)

Irreligion in Spain is a phenomenon that has existed since at least the 17th century. Secularism became relatively popular among the wealthy (although the majority of the lower classes were still very religious) in the late 19th and early 20th centuries, often associated with anti-clericalism and progressive, republican, anarchist or socialist movements.

During the Second Spanish Republic (1931–1936) Spain became a secular state, placing limitations on the activity of the Catholic Church and expelling the church from education. During the Spanish Civil War irreligious people were repressed by the Francoist side, while religion was largely persecuted among the republicans.

During the Francoist Spain period (1939–1975) irreligion was not tolerated, following the national-catholic ideology of the regime; Spanish citizens had to be Catholic by law, though this changed after the Second Vatican Council. Irreligious people could not be public workers or express their thoughts openly.

After the Spanish democratic transition (1975–1982), restrictions on irreligion were lifted. In the last decades religious practice has fallen dramatically and irreligion has grown in popularity.

== Demographics ==
In 2008, several reports indicated that as much as 60% of the population of Madrid and its metropolitan area identified as non-religious. According to a 2009 study, the 46% of Spaniards aged 18–24 declare themselves atheist or agnostic. A survey by Centro de Investigaciones Sociológicas in October 2014 showed that 67.8 percent of Spanish people would today describe themselves as Catholic, although only 16.9 percent of Spanish people attend mass at least once a month. 10.8% define themselves as atheist and a further 16.7% as non-believers.

In 2016, based on the 2014 survey in which 71% percent of the total population identified with some religion, 13% of those who did reported attending religious services weekly. Prior in a 2008 survey, only 3% of Spaniards considered religion as 1 of their 3 most important life values.

According to a 2018 study by the Ferrer i Guàrdia Foundation, 27% of Spanish people are either atheist, agnostic or non-believers, with 49% of 18-24 year olds in one of those categories. Another report in the same year by Pew Research Centre showed that 31% of Spain did not believe in a God. In the same report other specifics mentioned that 22% of Spaniards believed in a god as described in the Bible, 48% in another higher power or spiritual force, and 20% in none of them.

In 2019, a study carried out by the CIS found that 48.9% of Spaniards aged 18–24 declared themselves atheist or agnostic, therefore becoming a majority over those who declared themselves as religious. In 2026, it was reported that 40% of Spaniards identified as "nons", while over 55% identified as Catholic, which represented a drop since the 1980s where 90% of Spaniards identified as Catholic.

== In government ==
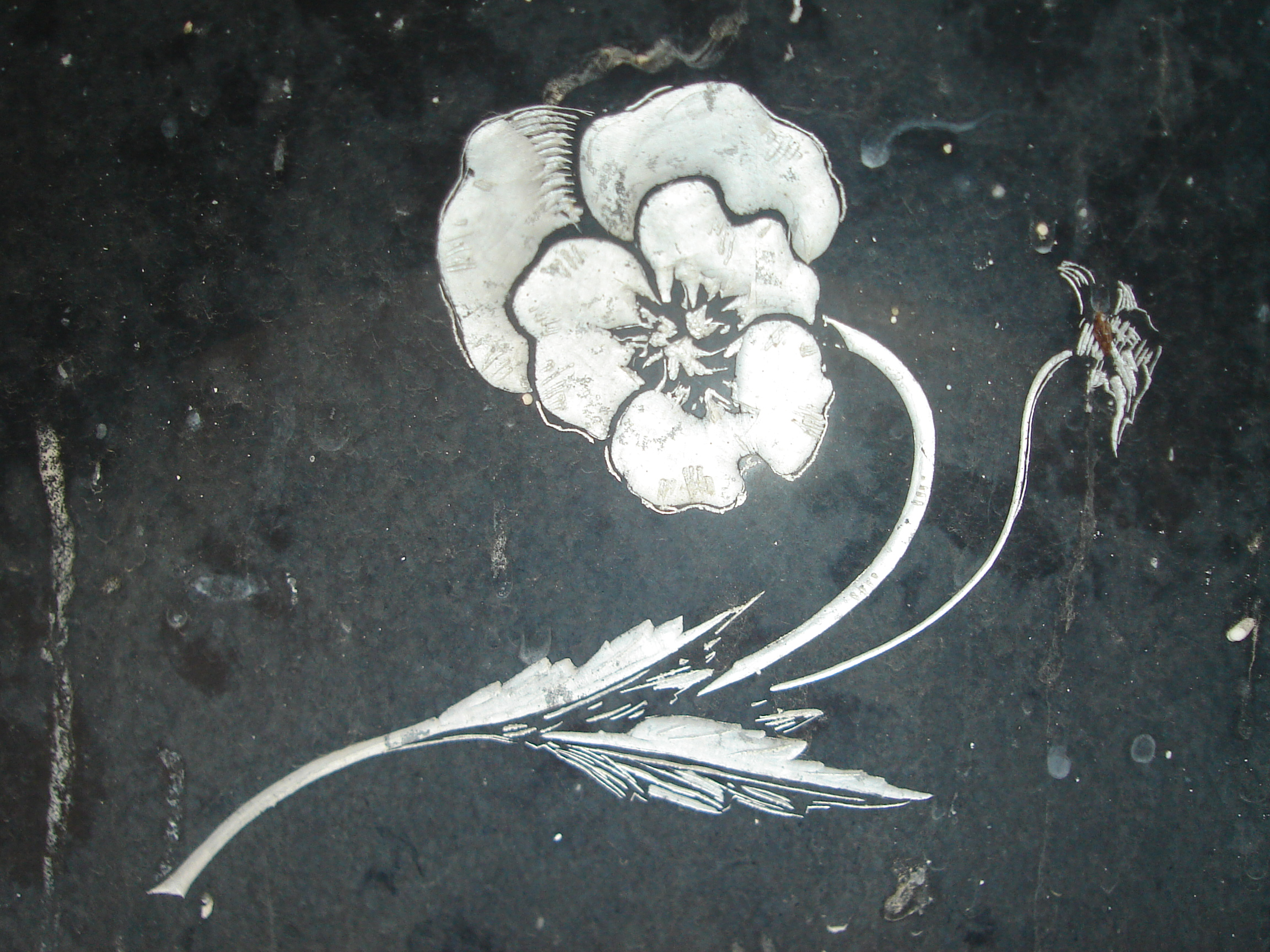
Tombstone detail of a freethinker, Cemetery of Cullera, late 19th century.

The close alliance of Francoist Spain and the Catholic Church is said to have had a considerable amount of influence on the decline of religion in Spain. The prevalence of the Church on the people and the subsequent end of the Spanish State caused the Spanish to detach themselves from Catholicism as political coercion was relaxed. In the 16 years after the transition from a dictatorship to democracy, there was a significant drop in levels of religious practice. According to Miguel and Stanek, there was a 14% decrease in religious practice in Spain in just those 16 years, decreasing at an annual rate of −2.1%.

In 1966 Francoist Spain passed a law that freed other religions from many of their earlier restrictions, although it also reaffirmed the privileges of the Catholic Church. In 1978 the new Constitution confirmed the right of Spaniards to religious freedom and began disestablishing Catholicism as the state religion and declaring that religious liberty for non-Catholics is a government-protected right.

Freedom of ideology, religion, and worship is guaranteed, to individuals and communities with no other restriction on their expression than may be necessary to maintain public order as protected by law.

No one may be compelled to make statements regarding his or her ideology, religion, or beliefs.

There is no state religion. The public authorities shall take into account the religious beliefs of Spanish society and shall consequently maintain appropriate cooperative relations with the Catholic Church and other denominations.

The process of secularization was already clearly recognizable by the end of the eighteenth century. The depth, influence, and continuity of Spain's liberal and democratic traditions are particularly important in trying to understand the values connected with the ideals of tolerance and religious freedom. Seen in this light, it becomes clear why Spain in particular was one of the first countries in the world to introduce women's rights and why the divorce law of the Second Republic (1931–1936) was one of the most progressive ever passed. It is the foundation for today's law on same-sex marriage, which has led to conflict recently.

Although more than 19 out of every 20 Spaniards were baptized Catholics, the secularization process has become more intense both on an institutional level as well as in the everyday lives of the people. It is argued that in return for the subsidy that the Church receives, society receives the social, health, and educational services of tens of thousands of priests and nuns. Instead, a system was set up to allow citizens to delegate up to 10% of their pay check to the church so that it was no longer government funded.

== In education ==
There exists an inverse relationship between the level of education and the social significance of religion. By 1980, a study was conducted that showed the more educated a person was, the more likely he or she was to be irreligious. This is attributed to the Church's new self-restraint in politics. The church began accepting the need for separation of religion and the state.

== Organizations ==
=== Unión de Ateos y Librepensadores (UAL) ===
The UAL is a new organization based in Barcelona which promotes atheism and unites atheists within Spain. The first post on their website is dated 11 January 2008, but they do not have information about their founding. The goal of the group is to inform Spanish-speakers who want to know more about atheism and unite those who have already chosen the atheist lifestyle. Their website contains links to atheist books, groups, and articles. The group has scheduled meetings every Thursday. They host events monthly with atheist speakers and writers. Similar local groups also exist within each autonomous community of Spain.

== Irreligious public figures ==
=== Agnostics ===
- José Luís Rodríguez Zapatero (1964 – ...), Prime Minister of Spain (2004–2011)
- Manuela Carmena (1944 – ...), former mayor of Madrid
- Javier Bardem (1969 – ...), actor
- Josep-Lluís Carod-Rovira (1952 – ...), vicepresident of the Catalan government (2006–2010) and leader of Republican Left of Catalonia (1996–2008).
- Cristina Cifuentes (1964 – ...), former President of the Community of Madrid
- Rafael Nadal (1986–), Professional tennis player
- Horacio Vázquez-Rial (1947–2012), writer and journalist
- Bernardo Bonezzi (1964–2012), film music composer

=== Atheists ===
- Alejandro Amenábar (1972 – ...), film director, screenwriter and composer
- Luis Buñuel (1900–1983), film director
- Pepe Rubianes (1947–2009); actor and theater director
- Antonia San Juan (1961 – ...), actress, director and screenwriter
- Pío Baroja (1872–1956), writer
- Javier Cercas (1962 – ...), writer
- Najat El Hachmi (1979 – ...), Moroccan – Spanish Catalan-language writer
- Pablo Picasso (1881–1973); painter, sculptor, printmaker, ceramicist, stage designer, poet and playwright
- Pep Guardiola (1971 – ...), professional football manager and former player
- Ignacio Escolar (1975 – ...), blogger and journalist. He currently leads the digital newspaper eldiario.es and he is also a political analyst in radio and television. He was founder and first director of the newspaper Público
- Pablo Iglesias Posse (1850–1925), founder of the Spanish Socialist Workers' Party (PSOE) and MP for Madrid (1910–1923)
- Ignacio Fernández Toxo (1952 – ...); labor and anti-francoist activist and leader of Comisiones Obreras, the biggest union in Spain
- Pedro Sánchez (1972 – ...), Prime Minister and leader of the PSOE, one of the largest political parties in Spain
- Pablo Iglesias Turrión (1978 – ...), former leader of Podemos, the third biggest political party of the country
- Albert Rivera (1979 – ...), former leader of Citizens
- Xosé Manuel Beiras (1936 – ...), Galician nationalist thinker and politician. Spokesperson of the BNG (1985–2002), leader of the opposition in the Parliament of Galicia (1997–2002) and spokesperson of Anova-IN (2012 – ...)
- Javier Nart (1947 – ...); journalist and member of the European Parliament for Citizens
- Fernando Alonso (1981–); two-times world champion between 2005 and 2006, driver of Aston Martin.
- Francesc Sunyer i Capdevila (1826–1898); radical republican, militant atheist, mayor of Barcelona (1869) and overseas minister (1873)
- Buenaventura Durruti (1896–1936), anarchist activist
- Francisco Ferrer Guardia (1859–1909), anarchist activist and founder of the Escuela Moderna
- Ricardo Mella (1861–1925); anarchist thinker, journalist and writer
- José Ortega y Gasset (1883–1955), liberal philosopher, and essayist
- George Santayana (1863–1952), Spanish-American philosopher, essayist, poet, and novelist
- Gustavo Bueno (1924–2016), materialist philosopher
- Fernando Savater (1947 – ...), philosopher
- Juan Pinilla (1981 – ...), flamenco singer
- Miss Shangay Lily (1963–2016); drag queen, writer, filmmaker and gay activist

== See also ==
- Religion in Spain
