= Lhuillier =

Lhuillier, L'Huillier or Luillier is a surname. Notable people with the surname include:

- Alberto Ruz Lhuillier (1906–1979) Mexican archaeologist
- Beatriz Lucero Lhuillier, wife of Jean Henri Lhuillier, Filipino winner of the 1992 Olympics bronze medal in taekwondo
- Jean Henri Lhuillier, son of Philippe Jones Lhuillier; Filipino entrepreneur
- Émilie L'Huillier
- Philippe Jones Lhuillier, Filipino Ambassador to Portugal
- Monique Lhuillier, Filipino fashion designer
- Marie Françoise L'Huillier de La Serre, French aristocrat and first wife of Jean-Baptiste Berthier (1721–1804)
- Victor Gustave Lhuillier (1844–1889), French engraver and etcher
- Waldeck L'Huillier (1905-1986), a French politician

== See also ==
- Fort L'Huillier, a former fort in Minnesota, US, named for Rémy-François L'Huillier
- Brand & L'Huillier, an armsdealer and manufacturer of the 12 cm Luftminenwerfer M 16 during World War I
- Cebuana Lhuillier, a pawnbroking business in the Philippines
- M Lhuillier, a non-banking financial services company in the Philippines
- Simon Antoine Jean L'Huilier (1750–1840), Swiss mathematician
