= Embassy of the Philippines, Madrid =

Diplomatic mission of the Philippines in Spain

Embassy of the Philippines, Madrid Pasuguan ng Pilipinas sa Madrid Embajada de Filipinas en Madrid

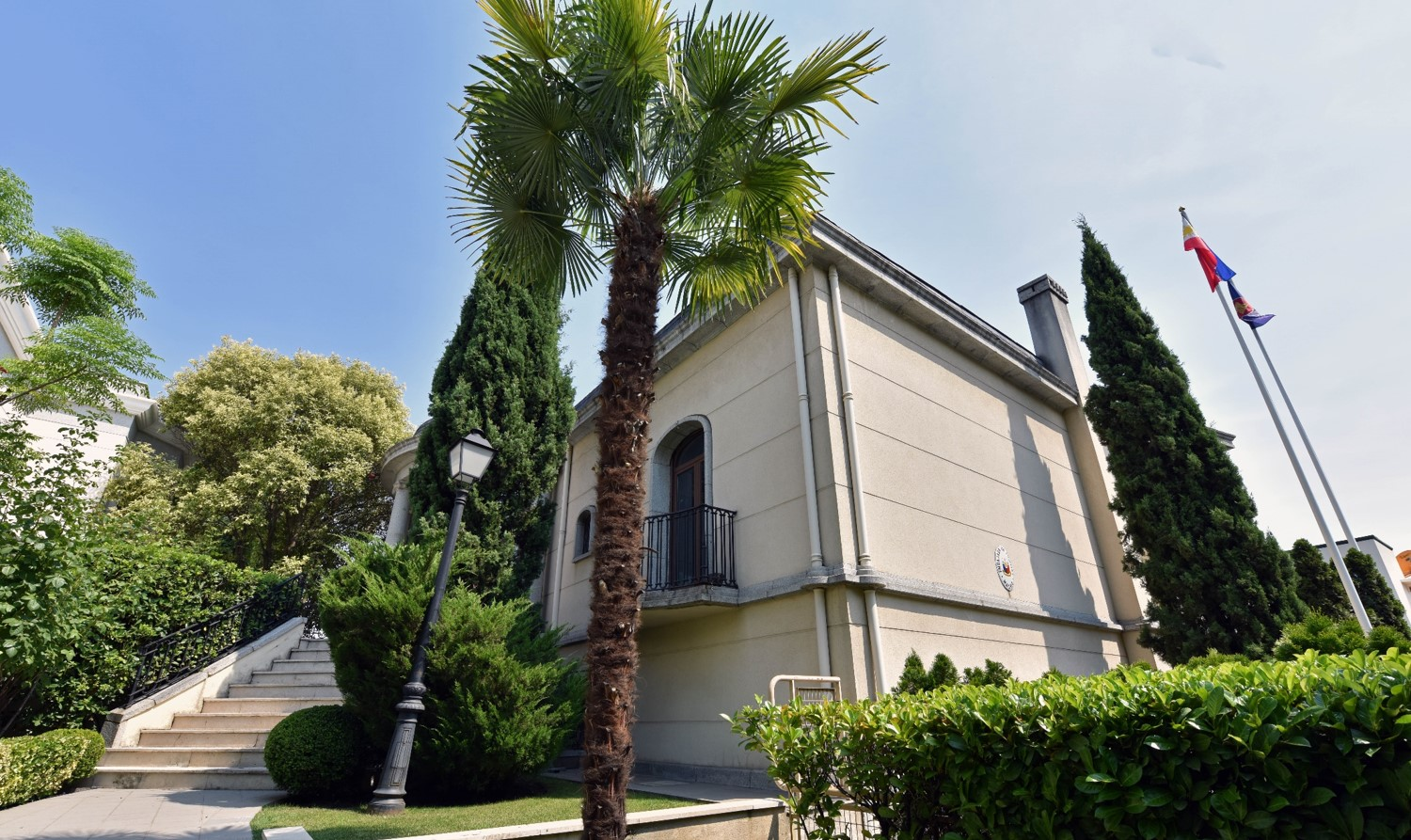
- Location: Madrid
- Address: Calle del Eresma 2 esq. Calle Guadalquivir, Chamartín, Madrid, Spain 28002
- Coordinates: 40°26′47.8″N 3°41′08.0″W
- Ambassador: Philippe Lhuillier y Jones
- Website: madridpe.dfa.gov.ph

The Embassy of the Philippines in Madrid is the diplomatic mission of the Republic of the Philippines to the Kingdom of Spain. Opened in 1951, it is located at the corner of Calle Eresma and Calle Guadalquivir in the barrio (neighborhood) of El Viso, part of the district of Chamartín in northern Madrid, where it has been since 1998.

== History ==
Relations between the Philippines and Spain were established in 1947, shortly after the Philippines obtained full independence from the United States. Initially, relations between the two countries were conducted through a legation, with former Insular Assemblyman Don Manuel Escudero y Casals being appointed as the mission's first minister plenipotentiary.

The legation was upgraded to a full embassy on January 5, 1951 with President Elpidio Quirino signing Executive Order No. 397, establishing the Philippines' first embassy in Europe. Establishing the embassy also reorganized the Philippines' diplomatic presence in continental Europe, with it also assuming jurisdiction over the legations in Paris and Rome. Don Manuel Morán, who previously was Chief Justice of the Supreme Court, was appointed by Quirino as the mission's first ambassador on March 20, 1951.

In 1997, the Philippine government purchased a 1,200-square-meter (13,000 sq ft) villa in El Viso, where other embassies were also located, to serve as the embassy's new chancery. Originally a two-story manor house, which was demolished to make way for the chancery, the fifty-year old property also included a stable and a large garden, on which the ambassadorial residence was later built. After a year of renovation work, the chancery was inaugurated by President Fidel V. Ramos in April 1998.

== Staff and activities ==
The Philippine Embassy in Madrid is headed by Ambassador Philippe Lhuillier, who was first appointed to the position by President Rodrigo Duterte on October 11, 2016. Prior to his current post, Lhuillier, a businessman who served as chairman of the pawnshop chain Cebuana Lhuillier, headed the Philippine Embassy in Lisbon as ambassador to Portugal, and prior to that served 11 years at the Philippine Embassy in Rome as ambassador to Italy. His appointment was confirmed by the Commission on Appointments the following week on October 19, 2016, and he presented his credentials to King Felipe VI some eight months later, on June 15, 2017.

Lhuillier would be subsequently reappointed by President Bongbong Marcos, Duterte's successor, on July 20, 2022, with his appointment being confirmed again by the CA on September 28, 2022. In addition to the ambassador, the Embassy is also staffed with 27 officials and other staff.

In addition to Moran and Lhuillier, other notable diplomats who have been deployed to the Embassy as Ambassadors to Spain include León María Guerrero III, who would serve between 1962 and 1965, and Don José Manuel Stilianopoulos, who would serve between 1972 and 1977, and who later in life would permanently settle in Spain. Current Permanent Representative of the Philippines to the United Nations Antonio Manuel Lagdameo also briefly served a year as ambassador from 2008 to 2009.

Part of the embassy's philosophy is that Filipinos living outside Madrid should not need to go to the capital in order to receive consular services. To that end, the embassy itself also conducts consular missions in other parts of Spain at least once or twice a year, with missions traditionally being held in southern Spain, Bilbao in the Basque Country and the Canary Islands, and more recently on the islands of Menorca and Ibiza.

In addition to the embassy, the Philippines maintains a network of honorary consulates throughout Spain which provide many of the same consular services in their respective areas, as well as assuming jurisdiction over the Consulate General in Barcelona, which reopened on March 2, 2020 after closing in 2012.

== See also ==
- List of ambassadors of the Philippines to Spain
- Philippines–Spain relations
- Spanish people of Filipino ancestry
- List of diplomatic missions of the Philippines
