= Embassy of the Philippines, Lisbon =

Diplomatic mission of the Philippines in Portugal

Embassy of the Philippines, Lisbon Pasuguan ng Pilipinas sa Lisboa Embaixada das Filipinas em Lisboa

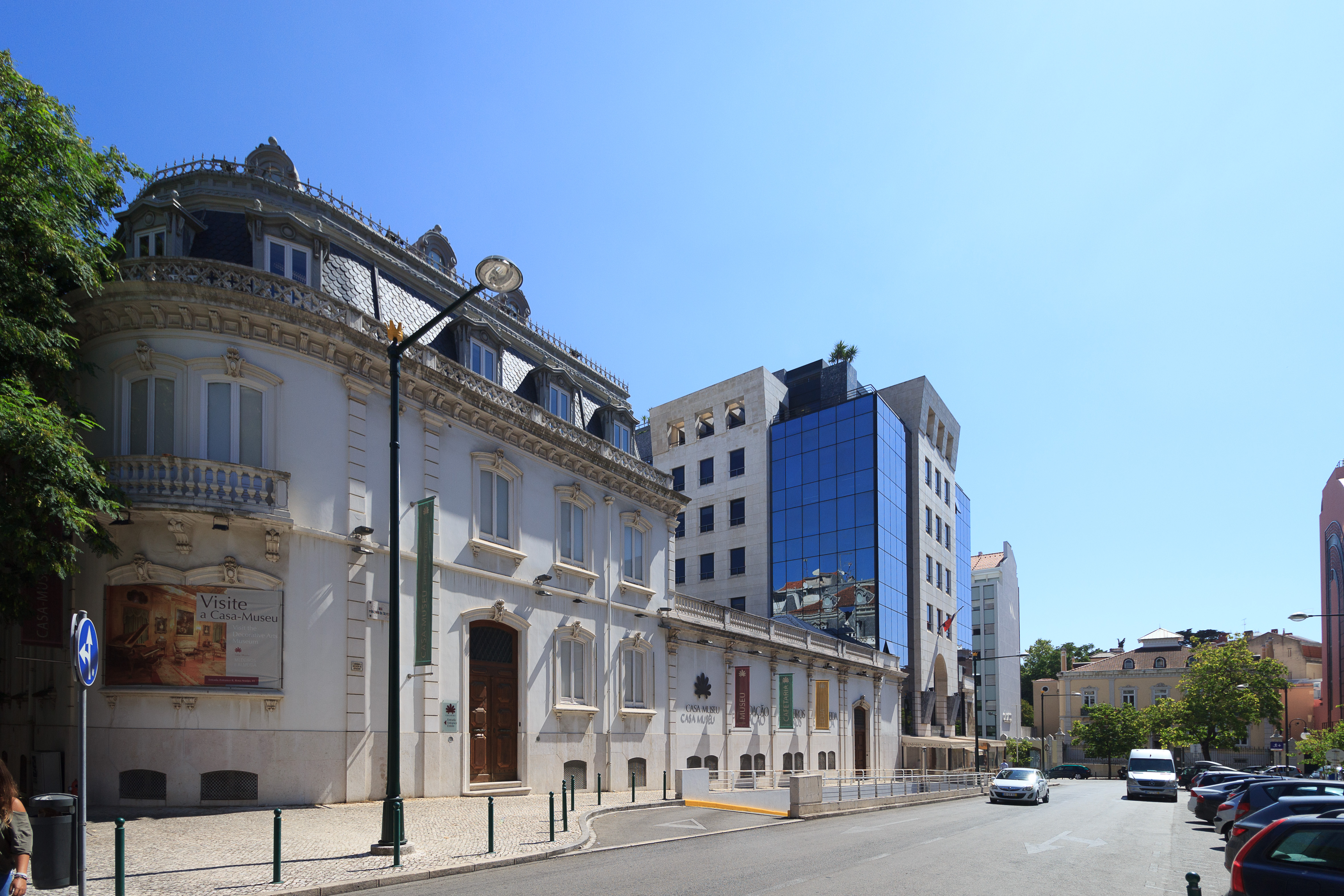
- Location: Lisbon, Portugal
- Address: Rua Barata Salgueiro 30
- Coordinates: 38°43′16.8″N 9°8′55.6″W
- Ambassador: Paul Raymund P. Cortes
- Website: Official website

The Embassy of the Philippines in Lisbon is the diplomatic mission of the Republic of the Philippines to the Portuguese Republic. It is located in the freguesia of Santo António in central Lisbon, next to the Casa-Museu Medeiros e Almeida, and near the Avenida da Liberdade and the Marquis of Pombal Square. Although the current chancery dates from 2010, the Philippines also maintained a previous resident embassy in Portugal between 1965 and 1974.

== History ==
Although diplomatic relations between the Philippines and Portugal were established on September 3, 1959, during the presidency of Carlos P. Garcia, the Philippines did not immediately open a diplomatic mission in Portugal. Garcia's successor, Diosdado Macapagal, would sign an administrative order designating an embassy in Portugal on March 20, 1965, and nearly three months later on June 8, 1965, he announced that the Philippines would open a resident embassy in Lisbon later that year.

Macapagal's successor, Ferdinand Marcos, subsequently ordered the embassy's closure in 1974. While there was no resident embassy in Portugal, relations were conducted through an honorary consulate, led by Manuel Pinheiro, and the country was placed under the jurisdiction of the Philippine Embassy in Paris.

The Philippine Embassy in Lisbon was reopened in 2010, during the presidency of Gloria Macapagal Arroyo at around the same time new embassies were also opened in Finland, Ireland and Poland. Arroyo's successor, Benigno Aquino III, would later appoint Philippe J. Lhuillier, at the time serving at the Philippine Embassy in Rome as ambassador to Italy, as ambassador to Portugal, with Lhuillier assuming his post on October 8, 2012. In 2015, the embassy's jurisdiction was expanded to include Angola, Cape Verde, Guinea-Bissau and São Tomé and Príncipe, covering most of the Portuguese-speaking African countries.

After a massive expansion of the Philippines' diplomatic presence abroad during Arroyo's presidency, in 2010 Senator Franklin Drilon questioned the need for embassies in countries with small Filipino communities, including a number of countries in Europe, and called for a review of the Philippines' diplomatic presence worldwide. This would lead to the closure of ten posts under Aquino, which took effect by October 31, 2012. The closures were not without controversy: Victoria "Vickie" Villar, who led a protest march against the then-impending closure of the Philippine Consulate General in Frankfurt, demanded that the embassy in Lisbon be closed instead as there were fewer Filipinos in Portugal compared to Germany.

== Staff and activities ==
The Philippine Embassy in Lisbon is currently headed by Ambassador Paul Raymund P. Cortes, who was appointed to the position by President Bongbong Marcos on May 11, 2023. Prior to his appointment as ambassador, Cortes, a career diplomat, served as Assistant Secretary for Migrant Workers' Affairs, and before that served as Consul General at the Philippine Consulate General in Dubai. His appointment was confirmed by the Commission on Appointments on May 31, 2023, and he presented his credentials to Portuguese President Marcelo Rebelo de Sousa on November 28, 2023.

Many of the embassy's activities are connected to deepening and strengthening cultural and economic ties between the Philippines and Portugal – ties which were described by Lhuillier as being "stale" and which ought to be revived. Among its activities include organizing an exhibition on the banig mats of Basey, facilitating a workshop on Philippine weaving traditions, hosting a round table discussion on Portugal as an investment destination for Philippine businesses, and promoting the Philippines as a tourist destination.

In addition to these activities, the embassy also conducts welfare activities for the community of Filipinos in Portugal, including warning Filipinos against non-existent scam job listings in Portugal, and registering Filipino seafarers based in the country as voters in upcoming elections.

== See also ==
- Filipinos in Portugal
- List of diplomatic missions of the Philippines
