= Pickle Yard Conference League =

- Sport: Pickleball
- Founded: 2025
- First season: 2026
- No. of teams: 10
- Country: Philippines
- 2026 Pickle Yard Conference League

The Pickle Yard Conference League (PYCL) is a professional pickleball league in the Philippines.

== History ==
Philippines-based group, The Pickle Yard, launched the Pickle Yard Conference League (PCYL) in December 2025. The league consists of corporation-backed franchise teams and a draft system.

The inaugural season which started in March 2026, was preceded by the first-ever draft on February 28. The season started with ten teams.

== Teams ==
Pickle Yard Conference League teams
Team	Company
Born2WinPH Forex Bulls	Born2WinPH Training Services
Cathay Land Hacienderos	Cathay Land
Cebuana Lhuillier Gems	Cebuana Lhuillier
Dentacare Pearly White	Dentacare Philippines
Fortrust Masters	Fortrust Education PH
IAM Worldwide Warriors	IAM Worldwide Corp.
Pertua Stallions	Pertua Oil & Metal Treatment
Philex Vanguards	Philex Solutions Corp.
