= Consulate General of the Philippines, Barcelona =

Diplomatic mission of the Philippines in Barcelona, Spain

Consulate General of the Philippines, Barcelona Konsuladong Panlahat ng Pilipinas sa Barcelona Consulado General de Filipinas en Barcelona Consolat General de les Filipines a Barcelona

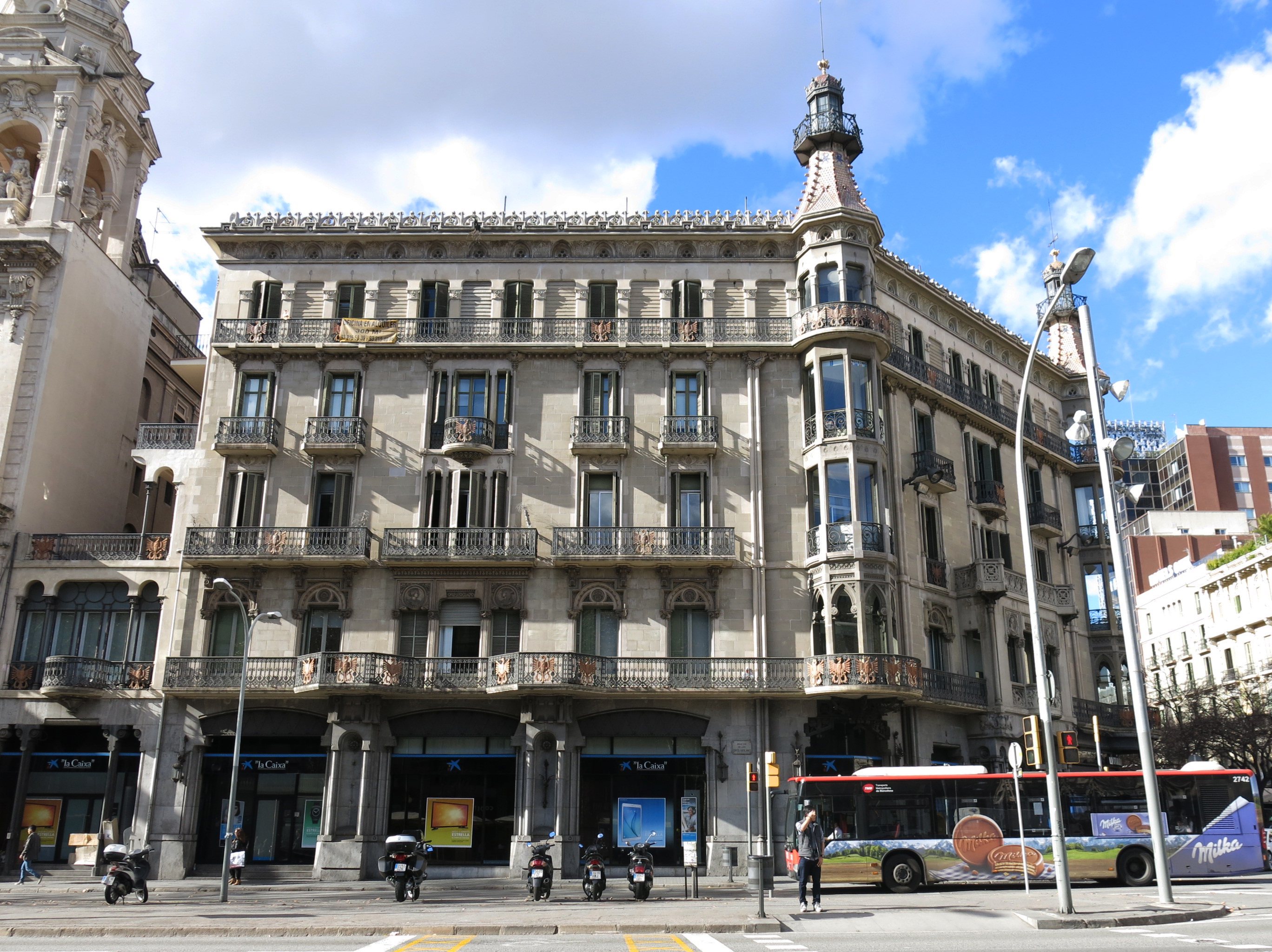
- Location: Barcelona
- Address: Gran Via de les Corts Catalanes, 601
- Coordinates: 41°23′18.7″N 2°9′59.5″E
- Consul General: Maria Theresa S.M. Lazaro
- Website: barcelonapcg.dfa.gov.ph

The Consulate General of the Philippines in Barcelona (Filipino: Konsuladong Panlahat ng Pilipinas sa Barcelona, Spanish: Consulado General de Filipinas en Barcelona, Catalan: Consolat General de les Filipines a Barcelona) is a diplomatic mission of the Republic of the Philippines in Spain, representing the country's interests in Catalonia. It is located on the first floor of the Casa Pia Batlló at the corner of the Gran Via de les Corts Catalanes and the Rambla de Catalunya in the Eixample district of Barcelona, near major landmarks like the Galeria Mayoral and the Coliseum. Although the current consulate dates from 2020, the Philippines also maintained a previous consulate in Barcelona between 2008 and 2012.

== History ==
The Philippine Consulate General in Barcelona was first opened on Independence Day, June 12, 2008, with Eduardo José de Vega serving as its first consul general. At its inauguration, Foreign Affairs Secretary Alberto Romulo noted that the mission's opening built on momentum arising from the 2007 state visit of President Gloria Macapagal Arroyo to Spain, highlighting the deepening relationship between the two countries.

After a massive expansion of the Philippines' diplomatic presence abroad during the Arroyo presidency, in 2010 Senator Franklin Drilon questioned the need for embassies in countries with small Filipino communities, including a number of countries in Europe, and called for a review of the Philippines' diplomatic presence worldwide. This would lead to the closure of ten posts under Arroyo's successor, Benigno Aquino III, and ultimately to the closure of the consulate general on July 31, 2012. The closure was not without controversy: in January 2012, over 4,000 Filipinos from the local community – at the time around one-fifth of all Filipinos within the mission's service area – organized on Facebook to protest the DFA's decision. Led by journalist Daniel Infante Tuano, who writes for a local OFW publication, opponents of the closure called on the DFA to organize more consultations, especially as it would be too inconvenient for the Filipinos living in the Consulate's service area to go to the Philippine Embassy in Madrid, 600 kilometers (370 mi) away. A petition was also organized alongside similar movements in other affected countries, with some 1,000 signatures being gathered in Barcelona on its first day.

While the consulate general remained closed, relations were conducted through an honorary consulate, initially headed by businessman Jordi Puig. Puig would continue to serve as honorary consul until he was dismissed after participating in a pro-Catalan independence general strike on October 3, 2017, with the DFA ending his term six months early on January 31, 2018. Puig was subsequently replaced by lawyer Chona T. Abiertas, an ethnic Filipino, who assumed the position on May 26, 2018.

By 2017, the Philippine government had begun considering reopening the consulate general, spurred by the House of Representatives passing a resolution calling on the DFA to reopen it. Two years later, Foreign Affairs Secretary Teodoro Locsin Jr. announced that the consulate general would reopen as part of an expansion of the country's diplomatic presence under Aquino's successor, Rodrigo Duterte, and the consulate general finally reopened on March 2, 2020.

== Chancery ==
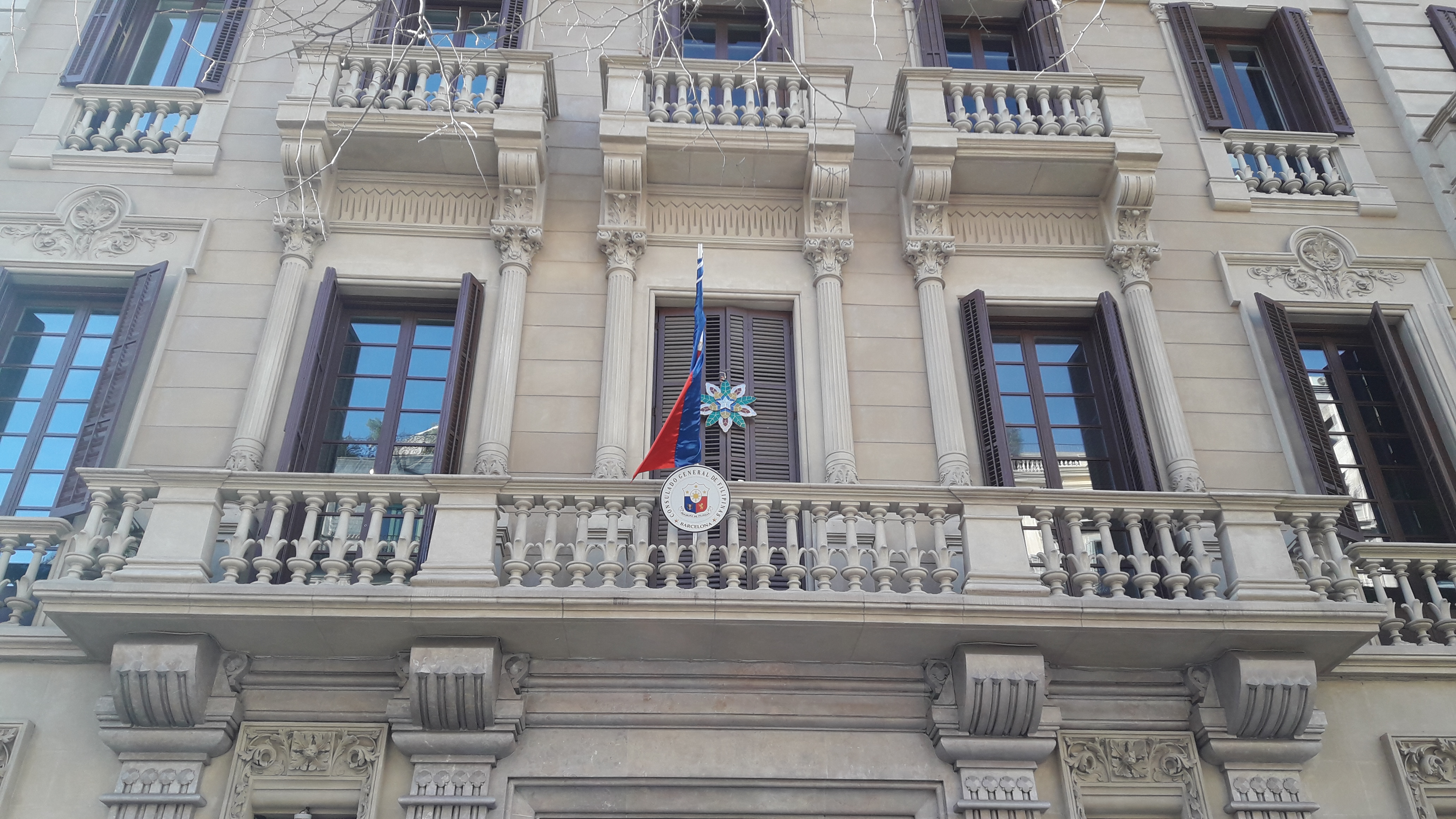
The former chancery at the Casa Rodolf Juncadella along the Rambla de Catalunya

The chancery of the Philippine Consulate General in Barcelona was first located at Gran Via de les Corts Catalanes 594, operating from a temporary office until it moved to a new location at the first floor of the Casa Rodolf Juncadella along the Rambla de Catalunya on September 1, 2020.

On August 20, 2025, the consulate announced that it was relocating to a new chancery at the first floor of the Casa Pia Batlló, located at the corner of Rambla de Catalunya and the Gran Via de les Corts Catalanes. Operations at the current chancery ended on August 26, 2025, and the new chancery opened to the public on September 1, 2025.

== Staff and activities ==
The Philippine Consulate General in Barcelona is headed by Consul General Maria Theresa S.M. Lazaro, who assumed the position on March 27, 2021. Prior to her appointment as consul general, Lazaro, a career diplomat who has been with the Philippine foreign service since 2000, served as the Executive Director of the DFA's Office of Consular Affairs, and was also previously deployed to the embassies in London and Bern.

Currently, the consulate general's jurisdiction covers Catalonia, Aragon, the Balearic Islands, and the Valencian Community, in addition to the independent country of Andorra. Some 25,000 Filipinos live within its service area, with the Philippines also being the only Southeast Asian country to maintain a career consulate general in Barcelona.

== See also ==
- List of diplomatic missions of the Philippines
- List of diplomatic missions in Spain
