= List of ambassadors of the Philippines to Spain =

Ambassador of the Republic of the Philippines to the Kingdom of Spain
- Sugo ng Republika ng Pilipinas sa Kaharian ng Espanya; Embajador de la República de Filipinas en el Reino de España
- Seal of the Department of Foreign Affairs of the Philippines

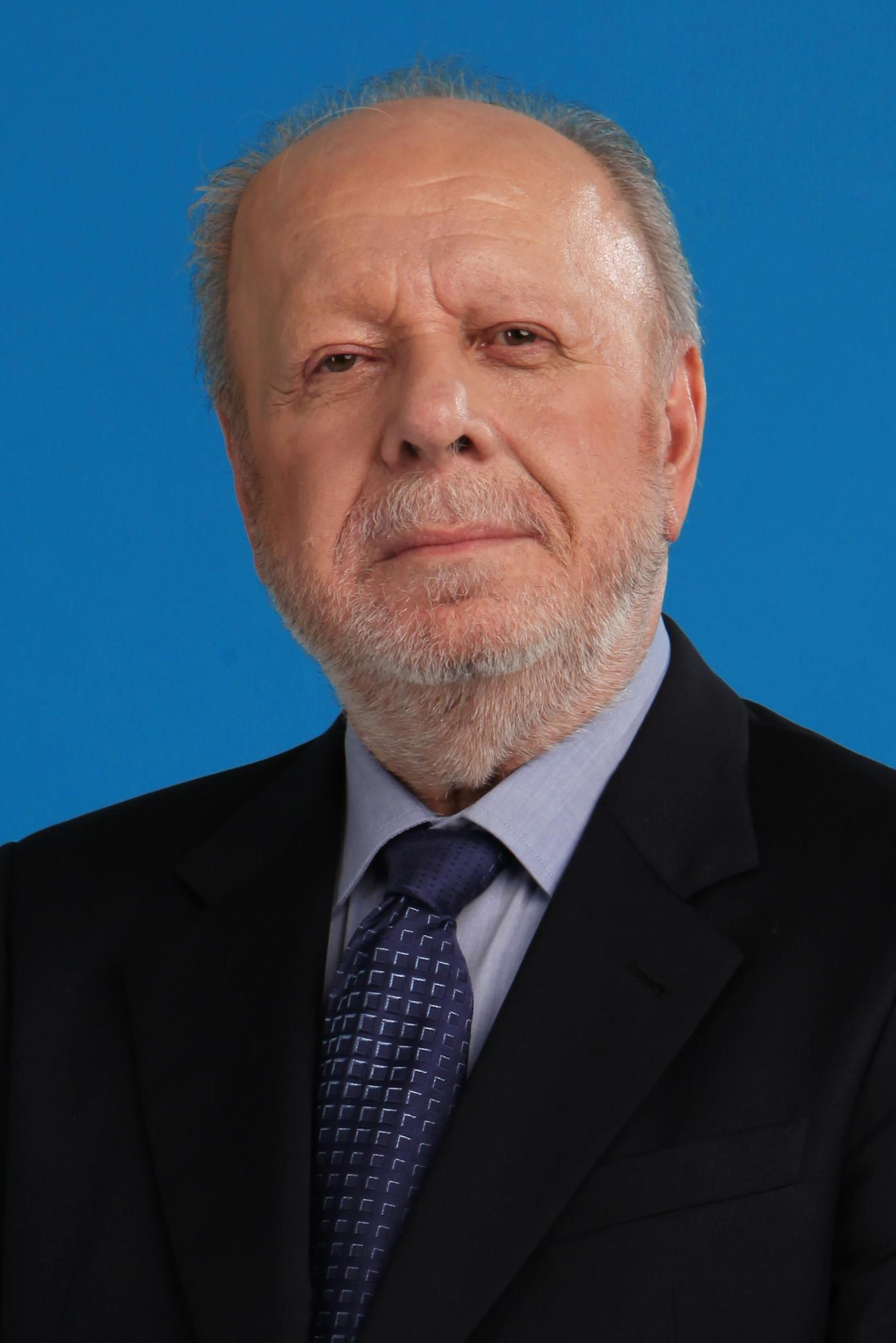
- Incumbent; Philippe J. Lhuillier since April 7, 2017
- Department of Foreign Affairs; Embassy of the Philippines, Madrid
- Style: His Excellency
- Reports to: Department of Foreign Affairs
- Seat: C. Eresma, 2, 28002 Madrid, Spain
- Nominator: Secretary of Foreign Affairs
- Appointer: President of the Philippines; with the advice and consent of the Commission on Appointments
- Term length: No fixed term
- Inaugural holder: Manuel Escudero
- Formation: March 6, 1948
- Website: Philippine Embassy, Madrid

The ambassador of the Republic of the Philippines to the Kingdom of Spain (Filipino: Sugo ng Republika ng Pilipinas sa Kaharian ng Espanya; Spanish: Embajador de la República de Filipinas en el Reino de España) is the Republic of the Philippines' foremost diplomatic representative in the Kingdom of Spain. As head of the Philippines' diplomatic mission there, the ambassador is the official representative of the president and the government of the Philippines to the monarch and government of Spain. The position has the rank and status of an ambassador extraordinary and plenipotentiary and is based at the embassy located in the capital of Spain, Madrid.

== List of representatives ==
Image	Head of mission	Spanish head of State	Spanish prime minister	Philippine president	Tenure	Note(s)
	Manuel Escudero	Francisco Franco		Elpidio Quirino	March 6, 1948 – 1951	First and only minister plenipotentiary.
	Manuel Moran	Francisco Franco		Ramon Magsaysay	March 20, 1951 – 1953	First ambassador extraordinary and plenipotentiary. Previously served as chief justice of the Supreme Court. Presentation of credentials on April 12, 1951.
	Pedro R. Sabido	Francisco Franco		Ramon Magsaysay	August 31, 1954 – 1955	Presentation of credentials on November 4, 1954. He would later serve as senator from 1956 to 1962.
	Manuel Nieto Sr.	Francisco Franco		Ramon Magsaysay; Carlos P. Garcia	January 23, 1956 – 1960	First term. Presentation of credentials on June 28, 1956.
	Pedro C. Hernaez	Francisco Franco		Carlos P. Garcia	September 15, 1960 – March 31, 1962	Presentation of credentials on October 6, 1960.
	Leon Maria Guerrero III	Francisco Franco		Carlos P. Garcia; Diosdado Macapagal; Ferdinand Marcos	April 13, 1962 – June 12, 1966	Previously served as ambassador to the United Kingdom from 1954 to 1962. Presentation of credentials on May 3, 1962.
	Luis T. Gonzalez	Francisco Franco		Ferdinand Marcos	June 14, 1966 – December 13, 1971	Presentation of credentials on July 14, 1966.
	José Manuel Stilianopoulos	Francisco Franco; Juan Carlos I (as King of Spain)	Francisco Franco; Luis Carrero Blanco; Carlos Arias Navarro; Adolfo Suárez	Ferdinand Marcos	December 19, 1972 – April 7, 1977	He would later serve as ambassador to the United Kingdom from 1977 to 1982. Permanently settled in Spain after retiring from the foreign service in 1983.
	Manuel Nieto Sr.	Juan Carlos I	Francisco Franco; Luis Carrero Blanco; Carlos Arias Navarro; Adolfo Suárez	Ferdinand Marcos	1977 – 1980	Second term.
	Manuel Nieto Jr.	Juan Carlos I	Adolfo Suárez; Leopoldo Calvo-Sotelo; Felipe González	Ferdinand Marcos; Corazon C. Aquino	November 5, 1980 – 1986	
	Juan Jose Rocha	Juan Carlos I	Felipe González; José María Aznar	Corazon C. Aquino; Fidel V. Ramos	May 9, 1986 – October 31, 1992	
	Isabel Caro Wilson	Juan Carlos I	Felipe González; José María Aznar	Fidel V. Ramos; Joseph Estrada	May 21, 1993 – November 30, 1998	
	Jose Zarate Oledan	Juan Carlos I	José María Aznar; José Luis Rodríguez Zapatero	Joseph Estrada; Gloria Macapagal Arroyo	March 1, 1999 – March 19, 2001	
	Joseph Delano M. Bernardo	Juan Carlos I	José María Aznar; José Luis Rodríguez Zapatero	Gloria Macapagal Arroyo	January 11, 2002 – July 16, 2008	Presentation of credentials on February 21, 2002.
	Antonio M. Lagdameo	Juan Carlos I	José Luis Rodríguez Zapatero; Mariano Rajoy	Gloria Macapagal Arroyo	August 23, 2008 – July 15, 2009	Presentation of credentials on September 24, 2008. He would later be appointed as ambassador to the United Kingdom on March 8, 2017 and would later serve as the ambassador and permanent representative of the Philippines to the United Nations from July 7, 2022 to July 31, 2025.
	Ana Ines de Sequera-Ugarte	Juan Carlos I	José Luis Rodríguez Zapatero; Mariano Rajoy	Gloria Macapagal Arroyo; Benigno Aquino III	July 23, 2009 – July 20, 2010	Presentation of credentials on September 28, 2009.
	Carlos C. Salinas	Juan Carlos I Felipe VI	José Luis Rodríguez Zapatero; Mariano Rajoy	Benigno Aquino III	February 8, 2011 – June 30, 2016	Presentation of credentials on May 17, 2011.
	Philippe J. Lhuillier	Felipe VI	Mariano Rajoy; Pedro Sánchez	Rodrigo Duterte; Bongbong Marcos	April 7, 2017 – present	Previously served as ambassador to Italy from 1999 to 2010, and as ambassador to Portugal from 2011 to 2016. Presentation of credentials on June 15, 2017.

== See also ==
- Foreign relations of the Philippines
- Foreign relations of Spain
- List of ambassadors of Spain to the Philippines
