= Filipinos in Portugal =

Total population
- 3,200 to 20,000 (2007)

Regions with significant populations
- Lisbon

Languages
- Portuguese, Filipino, English, other Philippine languages

Religion
- Majority Roman Catholicism

Related ethnic groups
- Filipino people, Overseas Filipinos

Filipinos in Portugal consist of migrants from the Philippines and their descendants.

== Notable people ==
- Chabeli Iglesias, born in Cascais to a Filipina mother and Spanish father

== See also ==
- Filipino Brazilians
- Filipinos in France
- Filipinos in Spain
- Filipinos in Italy
