= Embassy of the Philippines, Rome =

Diplomatic mission of the Philippines in Italy

Embassy of the Philippines, Rome Pasuguan ng Pilipinas sa Roma Ambasciata delle Filippine a Roma

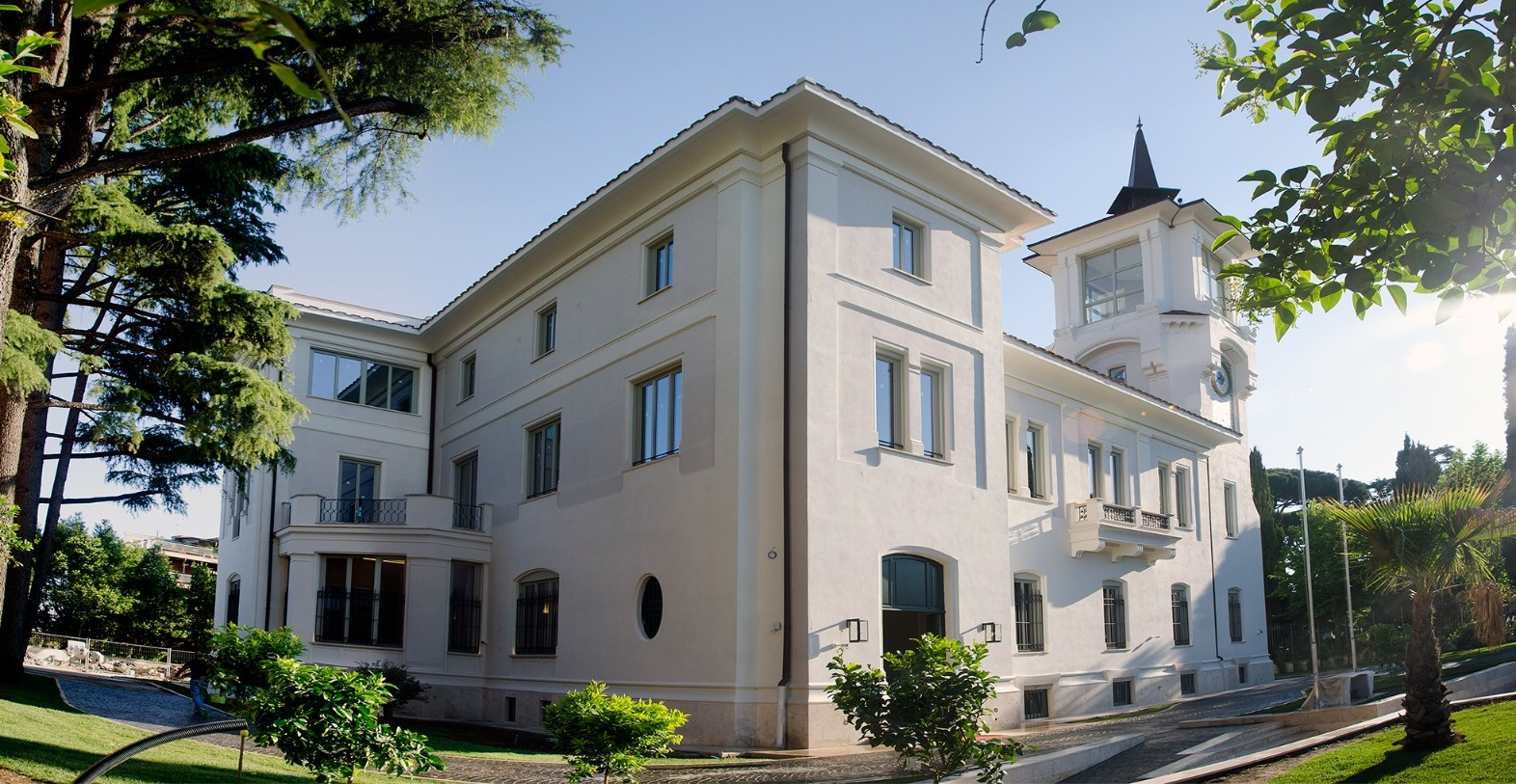
- Location: Rome
- Address: Via Aurelia, 290/A
- Coordinates: 41°53′53.7″N 12°26′16.4″E
- Ambassador: Nathaniel G. Imperial
- Website: romepe.dfa.gov.ph

The Embassy of the Philippines in Rome is the diplomatic mission of the Republic of the Philippines to the Italian Republic. First opened in 1947, it is currently located along the Via Aurelia in the quarter (quartiere) of Aurelio, part of Municipio XIII in western Rome, just west of Vatican City.

== History ==
Diplomatic relations between the Philippines and Italy were established on July 9, 1947, around a year after the Philippines obtained full independence from the United States. A legation was established a year later on July 5, 1948, and in 1951, President Elpidio Quirino signed Executive Order No. 397, reorganizing the Philippines' diplomatic presence in Europe and placing the legation under the jurisdiction of the Philippine Embassy in Madrid.

The legation was upgraded to a full embassy on August 9, 1956, during the presidency of Ramon Magsaysay, alongside the elevation of Italy's legation in Manila to an embassy by mutual agreement between the two countries. Manuel Alzate, who at the time was the Philippine minister to Italy, subsequently became the mission's first ambassador.

On February 26, 2014, the embassy's website was defaced by hackers protesting the Cybercrime Prevention Act of 2012.

== Buildings ==
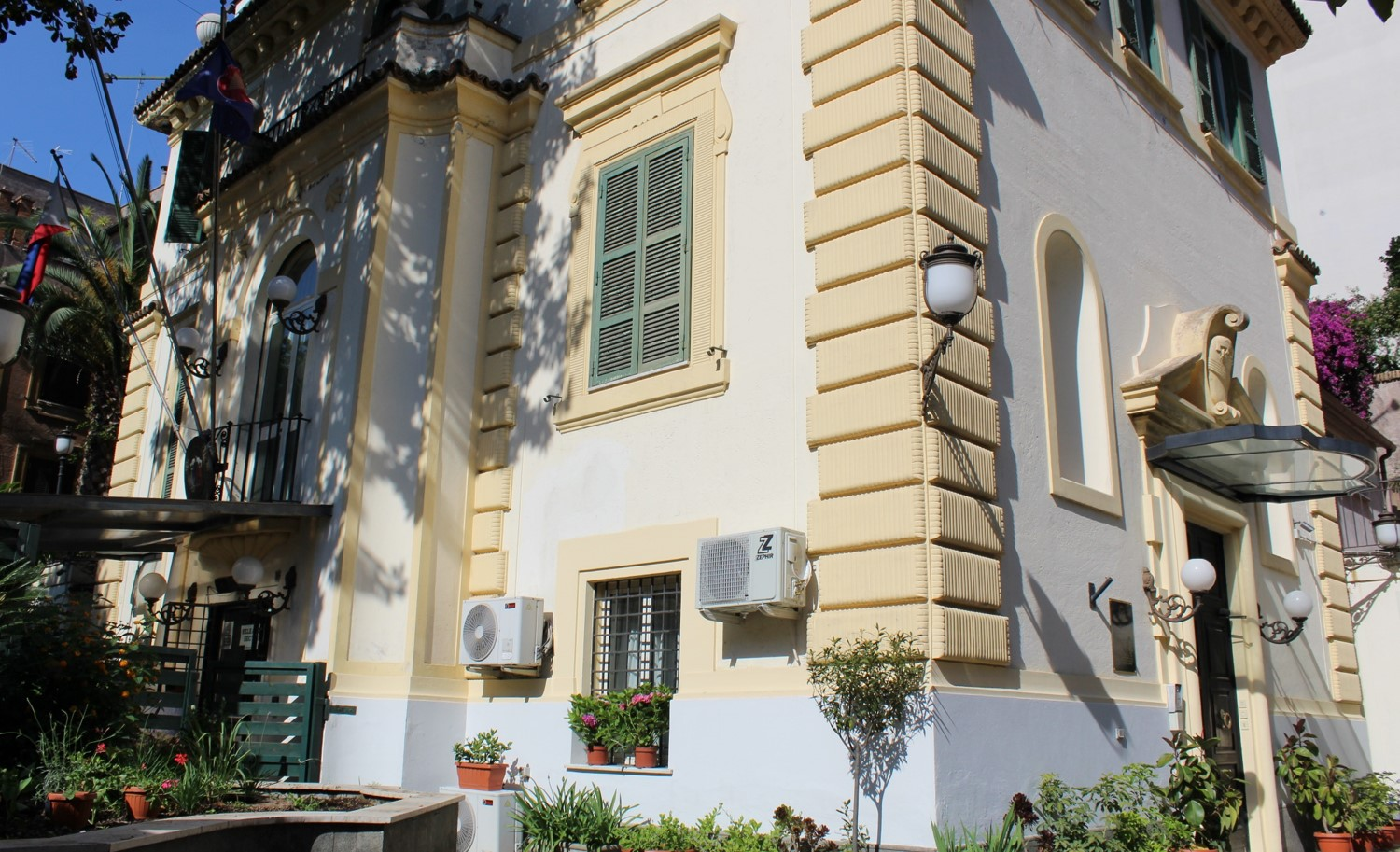
The former chancery at Viale delle Medaglie d’Oro, 112-114, which now serves as the ambassadorial residence

The chancery of the Philippine Embassy in Rome is currently located along the Via Aurelia on a property acquired by the Philippine government on April 10, 2018. Planning for the building's renovation began in September 2019 with the embassy initially budgeting some €963,000 (₱55.1 million) for the total cost of the project. Renovation contracts were awarded on November 25, 2019 to four companies: EffePi Costruzioni, KLF Italia, Edil Domus and Inotech Licht, and after over a year of renovation work the chancery was inaugurated on June 27, 2021 by Foreign Affairs Secretary Teodoro Locsin Jr. along with other dignitaries and embassy officials, and blessed by Cardinal Luis Antonio Tagle, Prefect of the Congregation for the Evangelization of Peoples. The new chancery was opened on July 7, 2021, with consular services transferring a week later on July 16, 2021, and other services moving a month after on August 16, 2021.

Located across from the Ospedale San Carlo di Nancy and neighboring the General House of the Missionary Oblates of Mary Immaculate, the current chancery replaces the previous chancery located along Viale delle Medaglie d’Oro in the neighboring quarter of Balduina, part of Municipio XIV. Originally built in the 1920s in honor of the future King Umberto II, the Philippine government acquired the four-story property in 1997 using a loan facility underwritten by the Philippine National Bank. The 600-square-meter (6,500 sq ft) property underwent renovations to expand its consular area in 1999 and 2012, with the latter renovation being designed by the Rome-based Cafelab Architectural Studio. However, as the property needed significant repairs, it was decided in 2018 to convert it into the ambassadorial residence, with the government budgeting ₱96 million for the conversion. Previous ambassadorial residences were rented, with the Department of Foreign Affairs (DFA) at one point spending up to $12,000 monthly in rent.

In contrast to the previous chancery, where no additional space could be added as the property's lot area had already been maximized, the current chancery contains a spacious consular area and is designed for both accessibility and energy efficiency, with the space said to be more conducive to the embassy's ability to provide consular services and conduct diplomacy and cultural promotion work. A bust of José Rizal is displayed in one of the building's hallways, and the chancery also has its own dedicated ceremonial hall for hosting events.

== Staff and activities ==
The Philippine Embassy in Rome is currently headed by Ambassador Nathaniel G. Imperial, who was named to the position by President Bongbong Marcos on September 1, 2022. Prior to becoming Ambassador, Imperial, a career diplomat, served as Assistant Secretary of Asian and Pacific Affairs at the Department of Foreign Affairs, and before that headed the Philippine Embassy in Tel Aviv as ambassador to Israel. His appointment was confirmed by the Commission on Appointments on September 28, 2022, and he presented his credentials to Italian President Sergio Mattarella on June 15, 2023.

A notable diplomat who served at the embassy was Philippe J. Lhuillier, who was ambassador to Italy from 1999 to 2010. Known for his work in supporting the Filipino community in Italy during his long tenure, his recall was not without controversy as The Philippine Star criticized his hasty replacement at the end of Gloria Macapagal Arroyo's presidency with Representative Antonio Cuenco of Cebu City's 2nd congressional district, who ultimately was not appointed to the position.

With Italy being home to one of the largest Filipino communities in Europe, many of the embassy's activities center around providing to the needs and welfare of the more than 170,000 Filipino Italians, including many Overseas Filipino Workers (OFW). Offices of the Social Security System and the Overseas Workers Welfare Administration are housed within the chancery, and the embassy has conducted activities such as evacuating Filipinos cruise ship workers stranded in Italy due to the COVID-19 pandemic, providing free legal services to the Filipino community, and working with the Italian government to address high rates of Filipino youth unemployment. The embassy has also worked to further the deep cultural and economic ties between the two countries, including organizing a trade exhibition featuring Philippine textiles, donating Filipino books to libraries in its jurisdiction, and showcasing Filipino films. Cultural outreach was enhanced with the opening of a Sentro Rizal center on November 29, 2016. The embassy also works closely with the separate Philippine Embassy to the Holy See.

In addition to Italy, the embassy exercises jurisdiction over Malta, which was transferred to its jurisdiction on January 21, 2014, Albania and San Marino, where it maintains honorary consulates. It likewise maintains a network of honorary consulates throughout Italy, located in Cagliari, Florence, Naples, Palermo and Reggio Calabria, and also exercises jurisdiction over the consulate general in Milan. The embassy is also accredited to a number of international organizations headquartered in Rome, including the Food and Agriculture Organization, the International Fund for Agricultural Development and the World Food Programme.

=== Popular reception ===
Popular reception to the embassy and its personnel is mixed. On the one hand, it has also been criticized for its delivery of services: in 2012, OFWs protested the embassy's application of increased passport renewal fees which were said to be in violation of directives coming from the DFA, while in 2016, OFW groups petitioned the DFA for the recall of ambassador Domingo Nolasco because of actions they felt were "inimical" to the interest of Filipinos in Italy.

On the other hand, the embassy has also been lauded for its work: in 2018, columnist Danilo T. Ibayan, writing in The Manila Times, lauded it for its successful track record in protecting the interests of OFWs in Italy.

== See also ==
- Italy–Philippines relations
- List of diplomatic missions of the Philippines
- Filipino Italians
