= Michel Lhuillier =

Filipino businessman

- Born: Michel Jones Lhuillier; 1941 (age 84–85); French Indochina
- Occupation: Businessman
- Known for: Founder of M Lhuillier
- Spouse: Amparito Llamas (m. 1964)
- Children: 4 (inc. Monique)

Michel Jones Lhuillier is a Filipino businessman who founded the eponymous M Lhuillier pawnshop chain.

== Early life and education ==
Michel Jones Lhuillier was born in French Indochina (in current-day Vietnam) in 1942. His father Henry Lhuillier is French, while Angelita Escaño Jones is a Filipino who hails from Cebu. Michel starting at age seven, began helping the family business and learned skills on jewelry appraisals and bookkeeping every summer break.

Michel Lhuillier obtained a degree in liberal arts and commerce at the De La Salle College in Manila. He graduated at the University of the Philippines Cebu with a master's degree in business administration.

== Career ==
=== Business ===
Michel settled in Cebu with his wife and helped maintain the family business of pawnshops and jewelry stores. He also held an executive position in the Visayan Electric Company which is managed by the Lhuilliers.

Lhuillier founded the eponymous M Lhuillier business in the early 1980s as an offshoot of the financial services of his father. The company, Michel J. Lhuillier Financial Services (Pawnshops), Inc., was laterincorporated in 1992.

The Cebu Safari and Adventure Park in Carmen, Cebu was opened in 2018 under the M Lhuillier Group.

=== Diplomacy ===
Lhuillier is an honorary consul for France in the Visayas. In 2014, he was conferred the Chevalier of the Légion d'honneur.

=== Sports ===
Lhuillier was involved in the formation of a Cebu-based football team named M. Lhuillier Jewelers F.C. in 1987. The team was formed after he met with Australian coach Graeme MacKinnon. The team is known for winning the 1988 PFF National Championship.

In 2019, Lhuillier is reportedly the chairman of the Cebu Provincial Sports Commission.

== Personal life ==
Michel Lhuilier married to Filipino socialite and former model Amparito Llamas on August 2, 1964 at the San Agustin Church in Manila. They had four children. He met Llamas, who is of Spanish descent, while he was still a college student.

Lhuillier is a collector of exotic animals and plants which led to him opening a safari in Carmen.
