= Spanish people of Filipino ancestry =

Immigration from the Philippines to Spain

Total population
- 200,000 (2018); Including an estimated 40,000 people with Filipino citizenship only.

Regions with significant populations
- Madrid, Barcelona, Málaga and other urban areas. The following numbers (from 2024) represent Filipinos in Spain with Philippine citizenship only.
- Community of Madrid: 17,471 (43.39%)
- Catalonia: 12,239 (30.40%)
- Andalusia: 3,372 (8.37%)
- Balearic Islands: 2,357 (5.85%)
- Canary Islands: 1,782 (4.43%)
- Valencian Community: 1,011 (2.51%)

Languages
- Castilian Spanish • Philippine Spanish • Regional languages of Spain • English • Filipino (Tagalog) • other Indigenous Philippine languages

Religion
- Christianity • Roman Catholic

Related ethnic groups
- Other Spaniards and Filipinos

Spanish people of Filipino ancestry refers to Spanish people of Filipino heritage who were born and raised as citizens of Spain, as well as immigrants from the Philippines and their descendants. Some 200,000 Filipinos are estimated to live in Spain, including 40,000 expatriates from the Philippines living in the country who do not hold Spanish citizenship.

Filipino migration to Spain has a long history owing to the Philippines being a Spanish colony for much of its history. Spanish settlers born and raised in the Philippines were originally referred to as "Filipino" (Criollo (Insulares), Mestizos or Peninsulares) individuals, while the native population of the Philippines were called "Indios" (Indigenous or Primitive people).

Filipino migration within the Spanish Empire was recorded as early as the 16th century, the first Filipino migrants to metropolitan Spain only began arriving in the late 19th century, forming the country's first and oldest Asian immigrant community, although mass migration would not begin until after Philippine independence. Rapid growth in the community since the 1990s has led to Filipinos in Spain forming one of the largest Filipino diaspora communities in Europe.

Historically one of Spain's largest Hispanic groups along with other Latin Americans, as well as one of the biggest Asian minority groups, today Filipinos rank alongside the Chinese and Pakistanis as among one of Spain's three largest Asian minorities. Most Filipinos in Spain overwhelmingly live in the country's two largest cities, Madrid and Barcelona, with smaller communities present in the rest of the country.

== History ==
The first Filipino settlements in Spain goes back to the Spanish colonial period of the Philippines between the 16th and 19th century, although most migration from the Philippines to Spain during this period was to the territories of New Spain, where some 3,600 Asians, mostly Filipinos working on the Manila galleons, migrated to Mexico between 1565 to 1815.

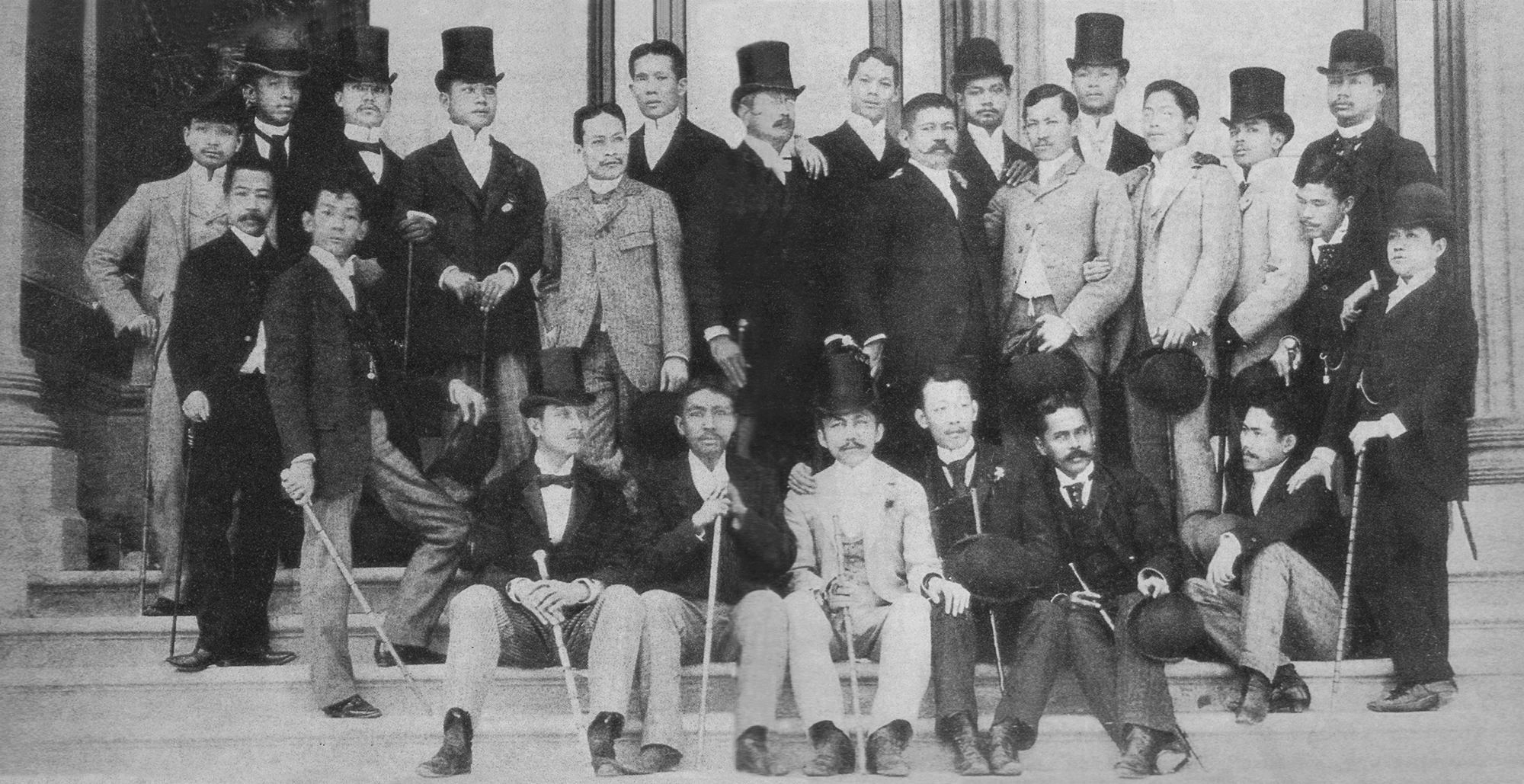
The "Ilustrados," pictured here in 1890, formed the first significant community of indigenous, mestizos and criollo (insulares) Hispanic Filipinos in Spain.

Migration to metropolitan Spain from the Philippines was practically non-existent for most of the islands' history under Spanish rule, and didn't begin until the end of the 19th century, when the "Ilustrados", largely from the middle and upper classes, pursued higher education in Spain. By 1880, some 200 Filipinos, including figures such as José Rizal, were living in Spain to pursue higher education, and although they would form Spain's first and oldest Asian immigrant community, many from this group of migrants would return to the Philippines later on in the wake of the Philippine Revolution. Intermittent migration from this period would continue until the early American colonial period when, starting in the 1920s, economic ties between the Philippines and Spain began to be cut in favor of ties with the United States. By the end of the Spanish Civil War, the Filipino community in Spain was estimated to only number around 200 people.

Contemporary migration to Spain from the Philippines can be broken down into three waves. The first wave of Filipino migration to Spain consisted primarily of Spanish Filipinos and Spaniards in the Philippines who would leave the country after World War II and in the first years after Philippine independence, beginning with some 300 survivors of the Battle of Manila who left the country onboard two ships, the "Plus Ultra" and the "Halekala." Contemporary economic migration did not begin until the 1960s, when a second wave of migrants moved to Spain as domestic workers, largely women in the employ of Spanish businessmen who in that period decided to return to Spain from the Philippines while bringing their domestic helpers along with them. This was followed by a third wave that began in the 1980s, whose members replaced those of the second wave who had since migrated to other countries, particularly the United States and Canada. The later two waves of migration significantly changed the makeup of the Filipino community in Spain, as later arrivals were typically of a lower social class and had few (if any) ties to the country compared to the existing community established by the smaller first wave of migrants, whose members were wealthier and had more ties to Spain, including familial ties.

Overseas Filipino Workers were not formally deployed to Spain in large numbers until 2006, when the two countries signed a memorandum of understanding on the entry of skilled labor, leading to the deployment of some 160 Filipino nurses and caregivers to nursing homes throughout Spain. The agreement, which would allow for up to 200,000 Filipino workers to enter Spain, also paved the way for other highly skilled professionals like engineers and doctors to migrate to the country. This led to significant growth in the community: while there were only 25,000 Filipinos in Spain in 1992, this grew to over 40,000 by 2006, and to over 50,000 by the following year.

== Demographics ==
=== Population and distribution ===
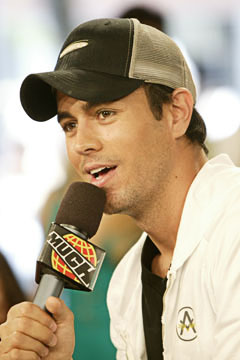
Enrique Iglesias

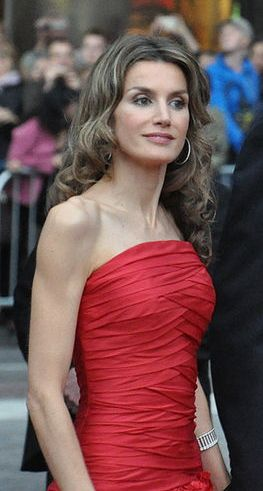
Letizia of Spain

Prominent Spaniards of part Filipino heritage.

Iglesias is a "Mestizo," while her majesty Queen Letizia is a descendants of Criollo (Insulares) Filipinos, who's great grandparents, grand mother and relatives from her mother's side were from the Philippines.

There are over 200,000 Filipinos in Spain as of 2018, and the Instituto Nacional de Estadística estimates that there are 57,498 persons in Spain who were born in the Philippines regardless of nationality, and 40,266 Filipino citizens registered in municipal registers (Spanish: padrón municipal de habitantes) throughout Spain regardless of place of birth, as of 2024. While Filipinos in Spain come from various parts of the Philippines, most originate from Luzon, with Tagalogs, Ilocanos and Bicolanos being the most numerous. As Filipinos can apply for citizenship after only two years' residence in Spain, some 2,000 Filipinos acquire Spanish nationality every year, a phenomenon which began in the 1990s, and it is believed that the actual number of Filipinos in Spain, including those who have since become Spanish citizens and their descendants, could be as high as 300,000 or more.

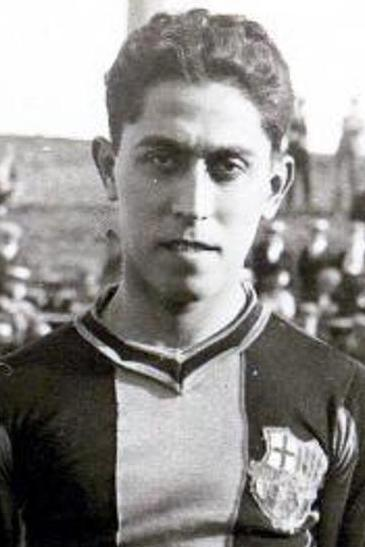
Football legend and FC Barcelona superstar, Paulino Alcántara was a Spaniard of Filipino origin.

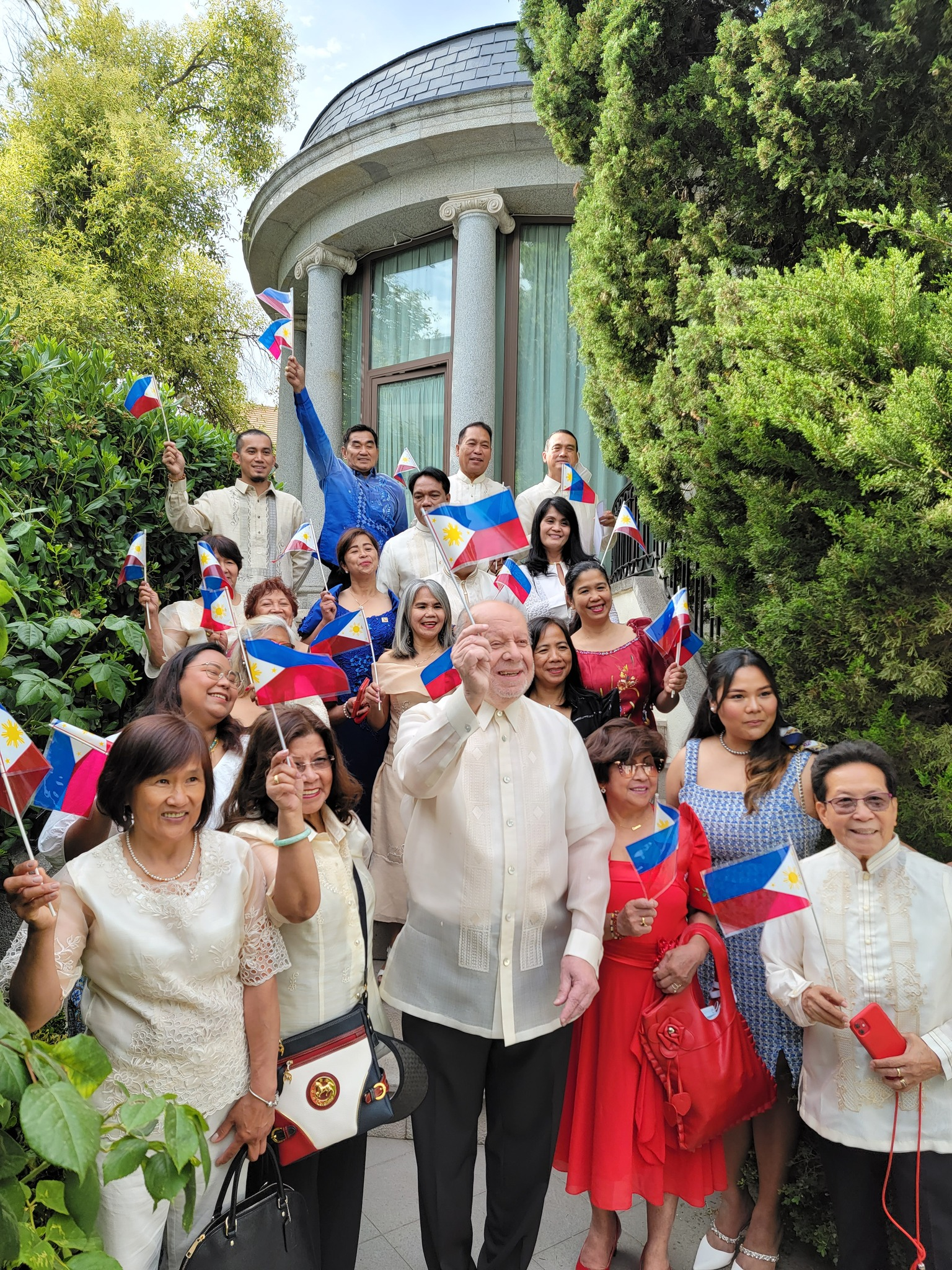
Members of the Philippine community in Spain, led by ambassador Philippe Lhuillier, celebrating Independence Day at the Philippine Embassy in Madrid on 12 June 2022.

Some three quarters of all Filipino migration to Spain is to the Community of Madrid and Catalonia, which are home to the oldest Filipino communities in Spain, and a distribution that is shared with Peruvians and Dominicans as communities that are particularly concentrated in these two autonomous communities. Smaller populations of Filipinos are also found in Spain's other autonomous communities, with the largest concentrations found in Andalusia, the Balearic Islands and the Canary Islands. For historical reasons, most Filipino migrants to Spain were working-age women, which is still reflected in the contemporary makeup of the community.

Major Filipino enclaves are found in the cities of Madrid and Barcelona, where most Filipinos in Spain live. In Madrid, most Filipinos live in the district of Tetuán, forming the largest immigrant group in four of the district's six neighborhoods, as well as in four other neighborhoods in other parts of the city, including the neighborhood of El Viso in neighboring Chamartín, which is home to the Philippine Embassy in Madrid. Meanwhile, about half of all Filipinos living in Barcelona live in the district of Ciutat Vella, with significant populations also found in the Eixample and Sants-Montjuïc districts. The community is primarily concentrated in the northern half of El Raval in Ciutat Vella, which is reportedly home to fifteen percent of all Filipino citizens in Spain and is also home to most of the local community's cultural and social institutions. In Andalusia, a more diffuse community is found in Málaga, with some 5,000 Filipinos residing in the eponymous province, including a significant community in Marbella, and a smaller community of some 300 in Seville. Beyond the peninsula in the Balearic Islands, up to 2,500 Filipinos live on the islands of Ibiza and Formentera, and up to another 6,000 on Mallorca and Menorca, while in the Canaries, communities are found in Las Palmas, where over 1,000 Filipinos live, and on the island of Tenerife.

=== Employment ===
Before 2006, most Filipinos went to the United States or Saudi Arabia to look for work and settlements, however in recent years, a new generation of Filipinos who went to Spain for work has increased in numbers, most of whom are qualified domestic helpers, and most Filipinos today in Spain work either as domestic helpers or in adjacent service industries, including in the restaurant industry, as hotel workers, and as house cleaners. Beyond the service sector, Filipinos are also employed as teachers, farm workers in rural Spain, nurses, language assistants, and military personnel. For Filipinos looking to migrate overseas, Spain is seen as an attractive destination due to its robust labor laws and generous pay and employment benefits, as well as the relative ease of obtaining legal residence in the country compared to other countries in Europe.

In recent years, Filipinos in Spain have also begun setting up their own businesses, with a number of Filipino restaurants, bars, bakeries, grocery stores and call shops, among other businesses, setting up shop in Tetuán, El Raval, and Las Palmas, as well as in other parts of the country. Wealthy Filipinos have also spurred demand for Spain's immigrant investor program.

== Community ==
=== Religion ===
The majority of their population are Christians, most belong to the Roman Catholic religion.

=== Education ===
Although a significant proportion of Filipinos who migrate to Spain are already highly educated, many are underemployed due to difficulties in getting their credentials recognized in Spain. Filipinos who want to exercise their profession in Spain are deterred by the high cost of homologation and the need to return to school despite already being certified in the Philippines, leaving them unable to find employment and forcing them to take lower-skilled jobs. Nurses, for example, have only been able to practice their profession as a result of the COVID-19 pandemic in Spain after working other jobs, where otherwise they wouldn't have been able to do so.

Increasing numbers of young Filipinos however are choosing to pursue higher education in Spain, owing to the variety of visa options available which allow them to study and even stay in the country more permanently.

=== Language ===
Spanish is the official language spoken, along with other Philippine languages and English in their community. Other individuals only speak Spanish, while some use both Spanish and English as their form of communication. Spanish is spoken together with Tagalog, Cebuano and other Philippine languages.

New Filipino migrants to Spain are often not fluent in Spanish, the same it goes with Spanish-born Filipinos who also finds it difficult to speak their indigenous Philippine regional languages of their community. In a 2020 survey, more than half of all surveyed Filipino migrants on Ibiza reported not being fluent in either Spanish or Catalan, although they were generally fluent in English, Filipino and/or other languages of the Philippines. While a lack of Spanish fluency has led to many Filipinos being underemployed, English fluency is a reported advantage for the community, as Filipinos often find work in the employ of other non-Spanish speaking foreigners.

Fluency in Spanish and regional languages increased with the children of migrants who are born in Spain, as they learn those languages in school along with English and other foreign languages. While they become native Spanish speakers, unlike their parents, it often comes at the expense of learning Filipino and other Philippine languages.

=== Sport ===
Football is a popular sport in their community.

== Notable people ==
A list of famous Spaniards of part Filipino heritage.

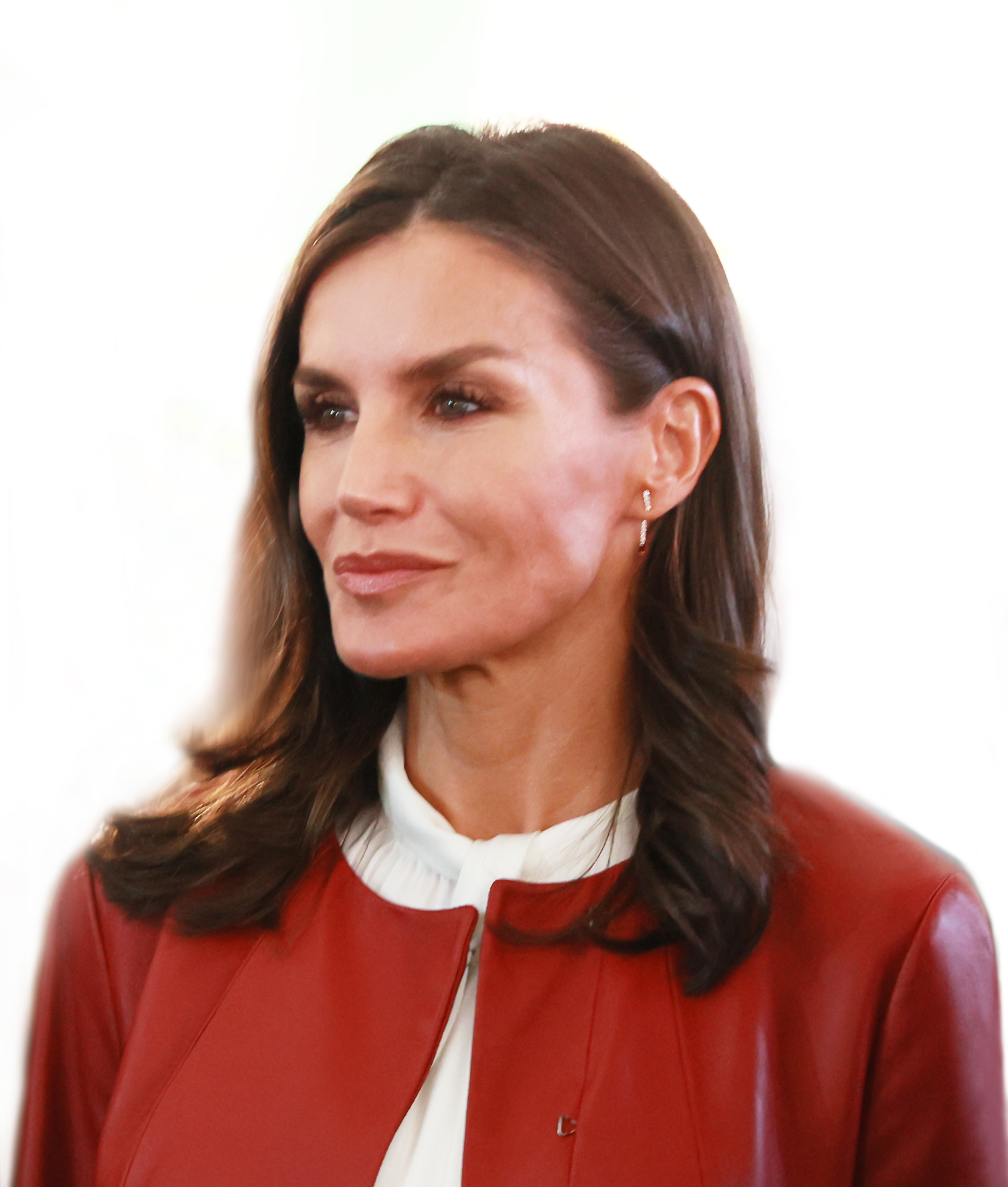
Queen Letizia of Spain

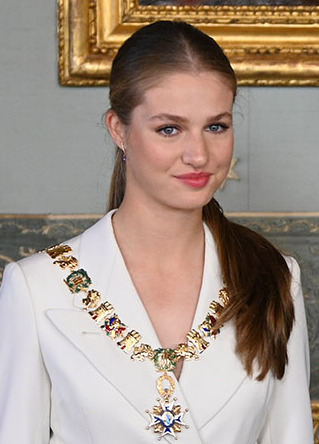
Princess Leonor of Spain

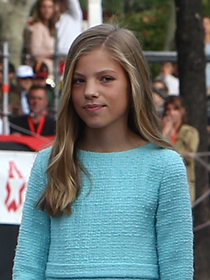
Princess Sofía of Spain

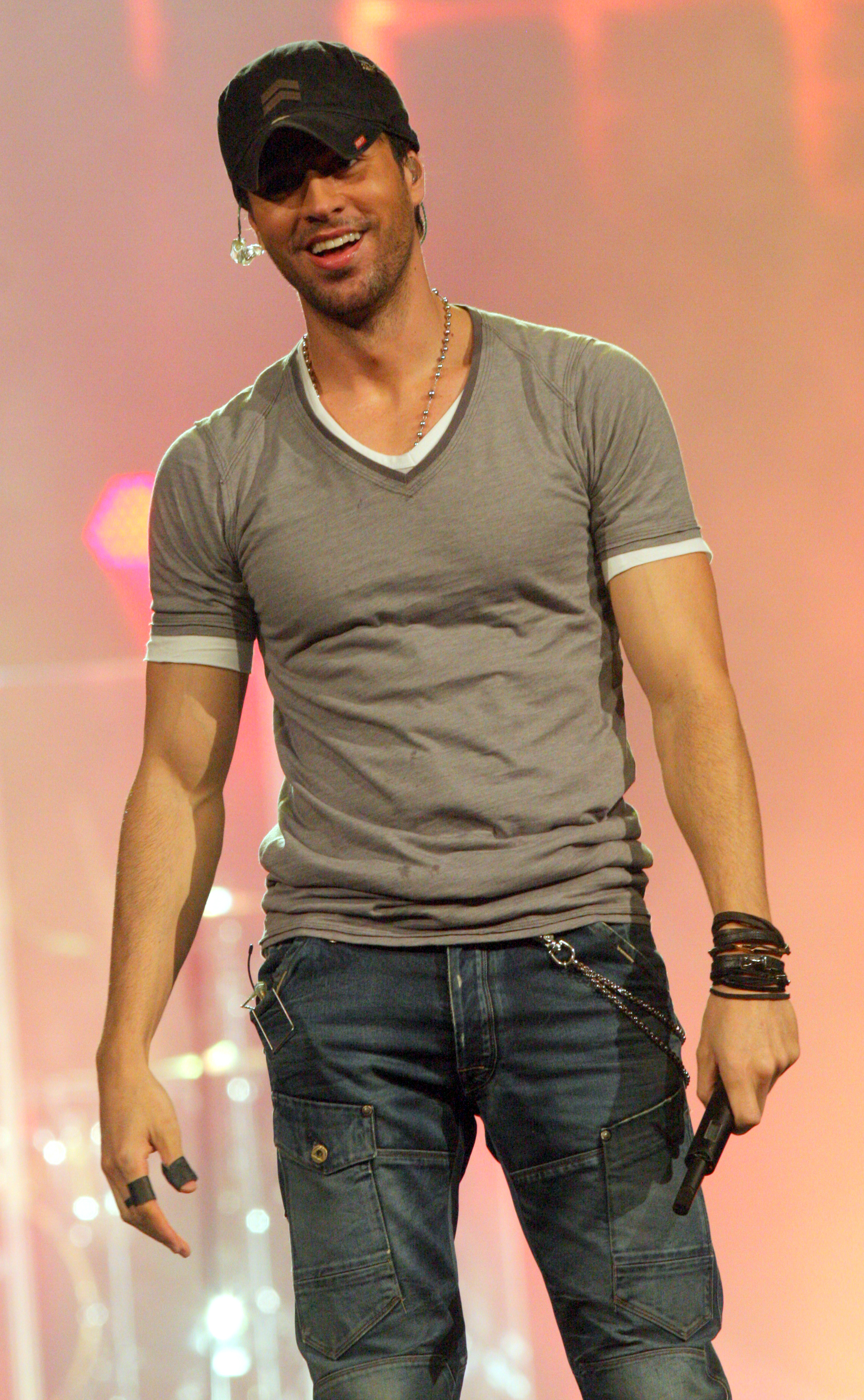
Enrique Iglesias

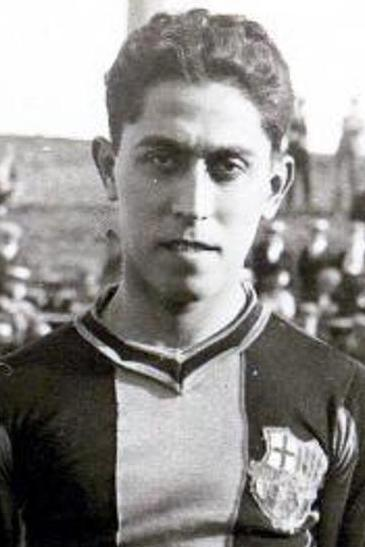
Paulino Alcántara

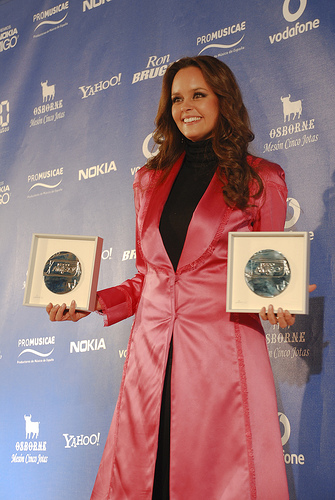
Shaila Dúrcal

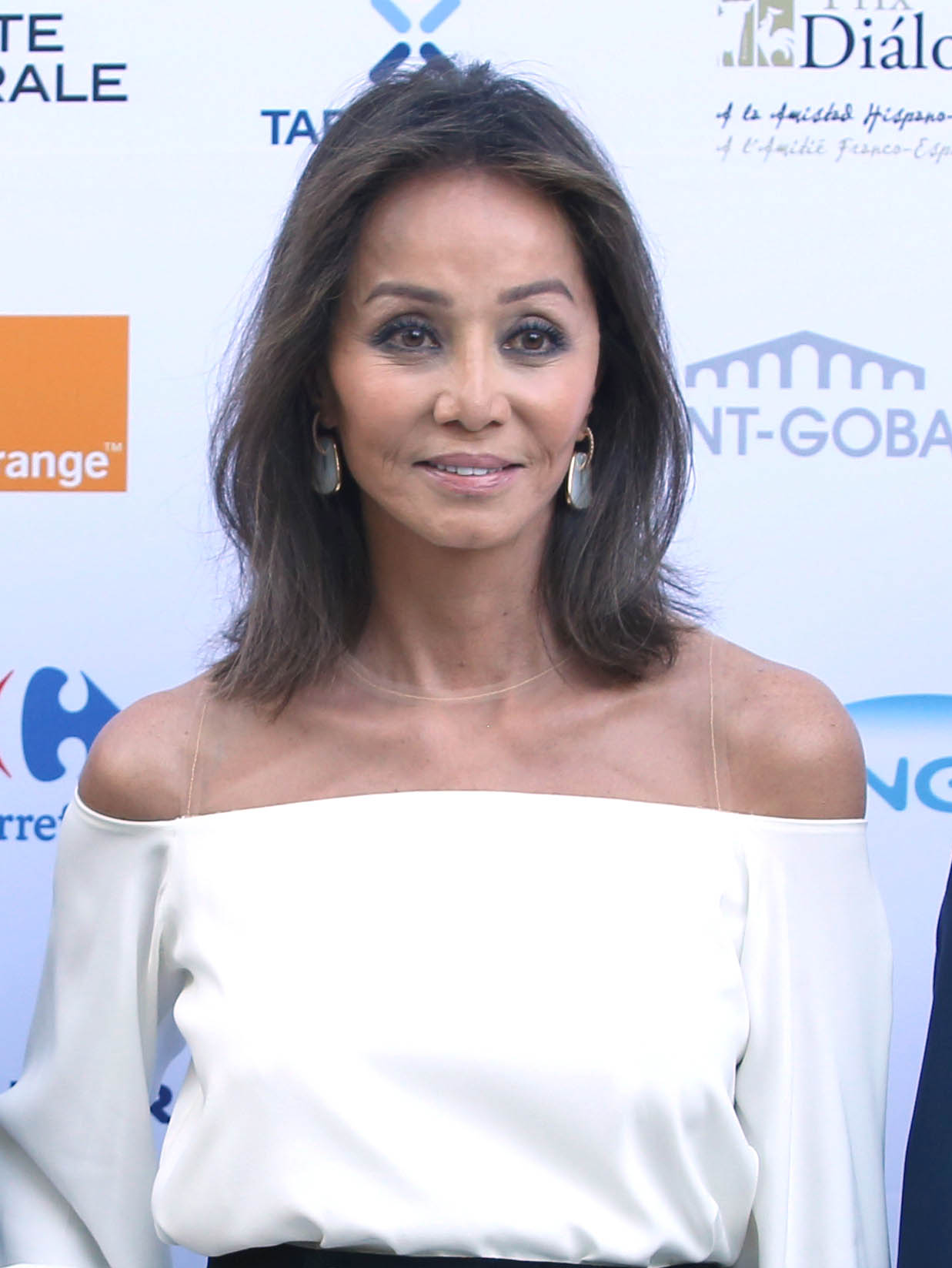
Isabel Preysler

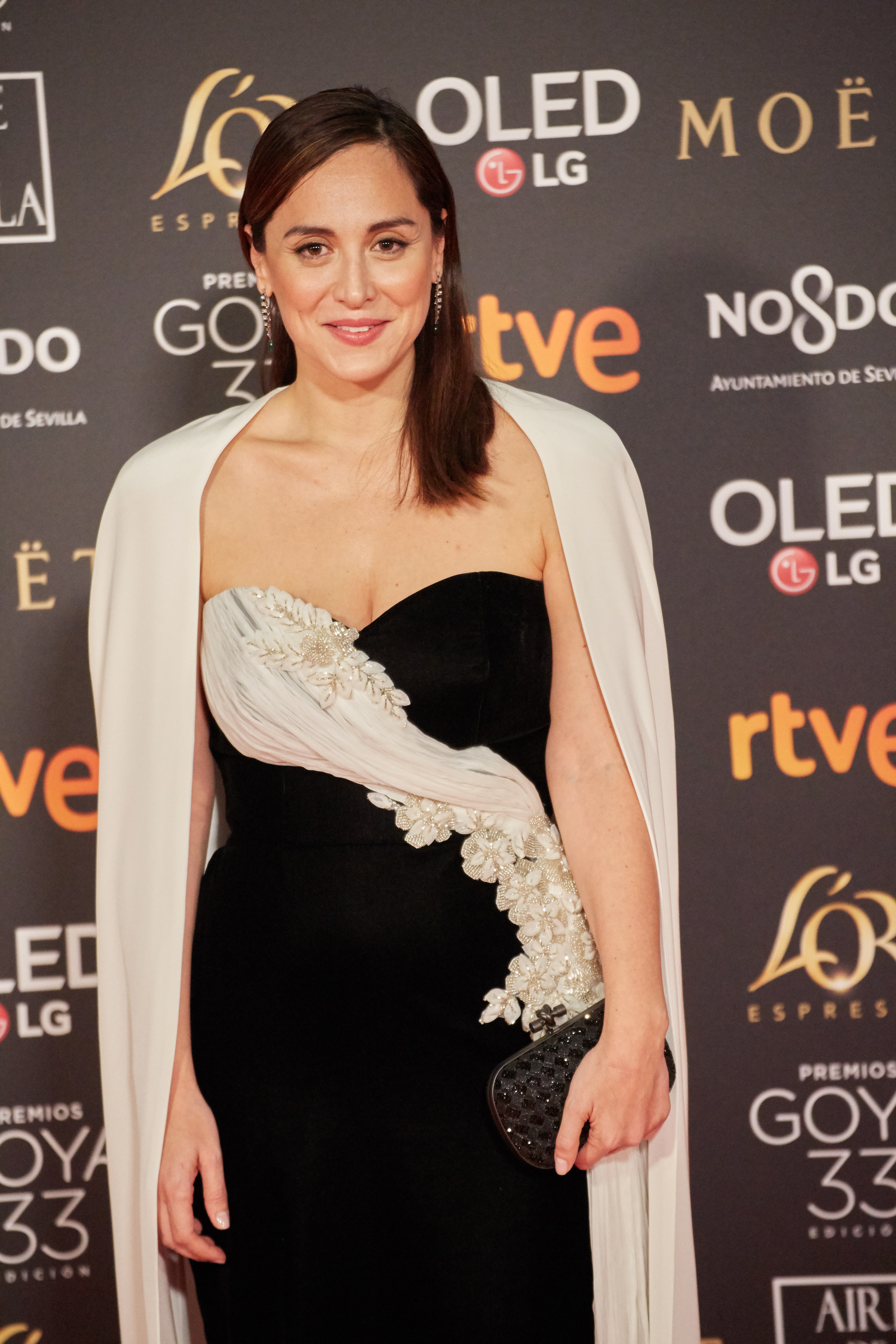
Tamara Falcó

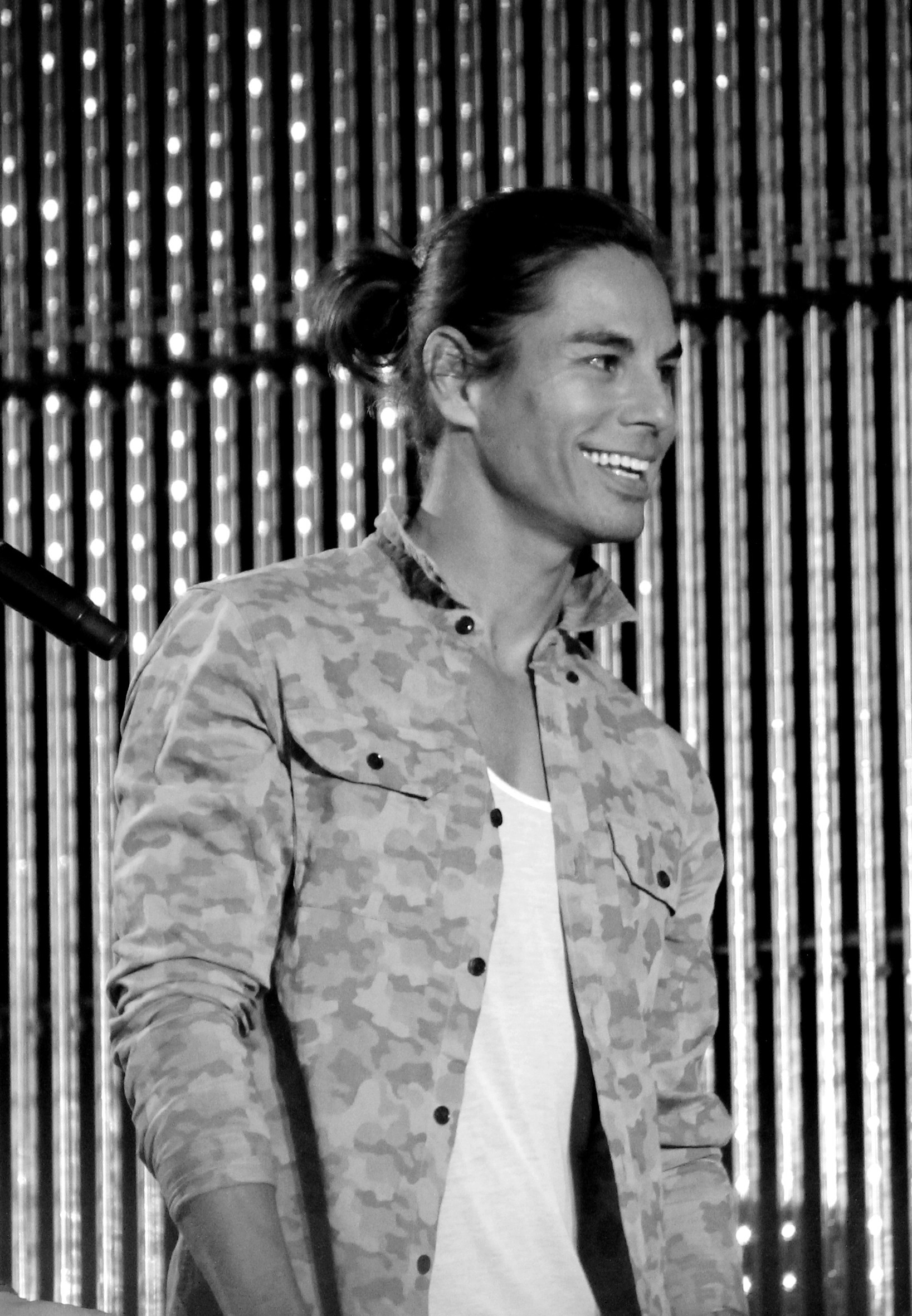
Julio Iglesias Jr.

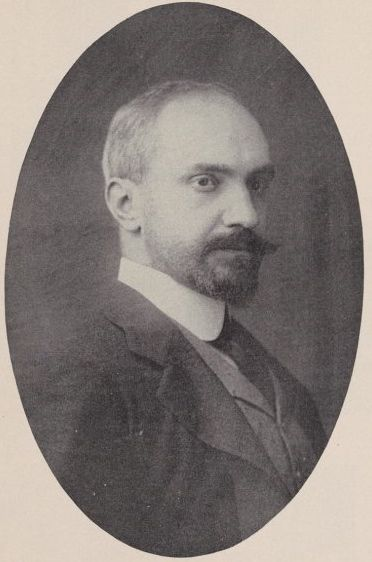
George Santayana

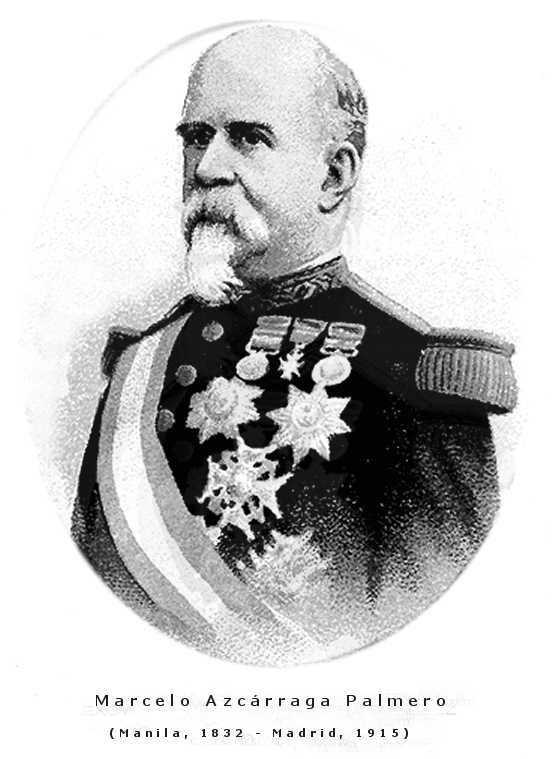
Marcelo Azcárraga

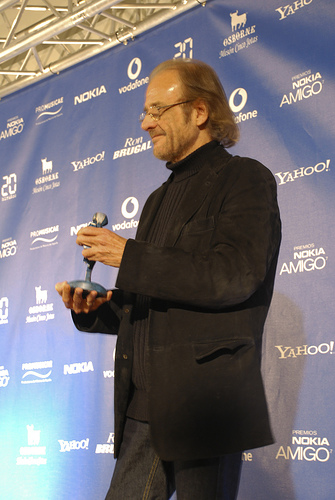
Luis Eduardo Aute

=== Spain ===
Spaniards of White Criollo (Insulares) Filipino descent

- Letizia of Spain - Queen of Spain
- Leonor, Princess of Asturias - Princess of Spain
- Sofía of Spain - Princess of Spain
- Marcelo Azcárraga - Prime Minister of Spain
- Jorge Moragas - Chief of Staff of the Prime Minister
- George Santayana - Writer and philosopher
- Luis Eduardo Aute - Singer and musician
- Eduardo Teus - Footballer
- Juan Torena - Actor and footballer
- Gregorio Querejeta - Footballer
- Manuel Amechazurra - Footballer
- Juan Luis Guirado - Footballer
- Ángel Guirado - Footballer
- Saúl Berjón - Footballer
- Álvaro Silva - Footballer
- Óscar Arribas - Footballer
- Kike Linares - Footballer

White Spaniards of Peninsulares Filipino descent

- Enrique Zóbel de Ayala - Businessman

White Spaniards of mixed Indigenous Filipino descent

- Paulino Alcántara - Footballer
- Enrique Iglesias - Singer
- Shaila Dúrcal - Singer
- Isabel Preysler - Journalist, socialite and television presenter
- Tamara Falcó - Aristocrat and television personality
- Julio Iglesias Jr. - Singer and model
- Marcelino Gálatas - Footballer
- Carli de Murga - Footballer
- Javier Patiño - Footballer
- Chabeli Iglesias - Journalist

Spaniards of Indigenous Filipino descent

- Santiago Rublico - Footballer
- Jackie Sagana - Singer
- Alexandra Masangkay - Actress and singer

=== International ===
A list of famous Filipinos in the Philippines of part Spanish heritage.

Filipinos of White Spanish Criollo descent

- Juan Johnny Rico - Novel and film character
- Jaime Augusto Zóbel de Ayala - Businessman
- Zóbel de Ayala family - Business family
- Fernando Zóbel - Artist
- Enrique K. Razon - Businessman
- Andrés Soriano - Businessman
- José María of Manila - Roman Catholic Saint
- Júnior - Singer
- Pilita Corrales - Singer

Indigenous expatriate Filipinos of mixed Spanish descent in Spain

- José Rizal - Nationalist, writer and polymath

Indigenous Filipino expatriates in Spain

- Ilustrados - Educated class
- Juan Luna - Artist
- Félix Hidalgo - Artist
- Bea Alonzo - Actress
- Kitchie Nadal - Singer
- Carlos Celdran - Political activist
- Antonio Luna - Revolutionary leader
- Geraldine Roman - Politician

== See also ==
- Philippines–Spain relations
- Spanish Filipinos
- Filipino diaspora
- Immigration to Spain
- Barcelona: A Love Untold
