= Monique Lhuillier =

Filipino fashion designer (born 1971)

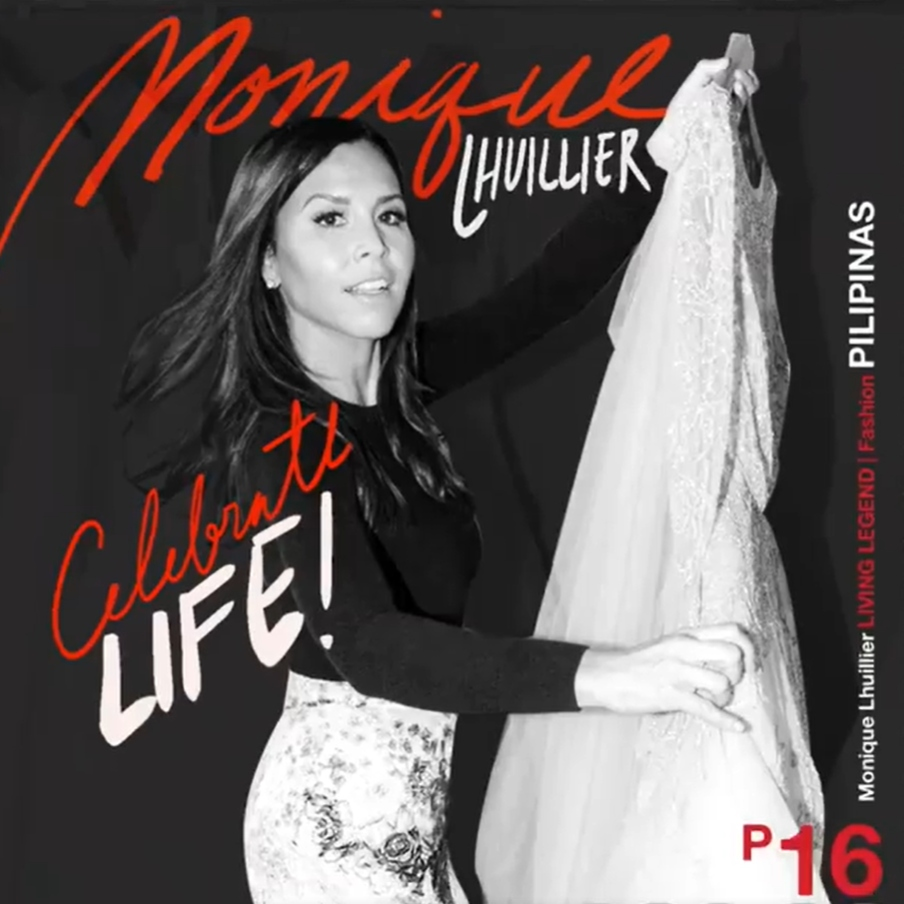
- Lhuillier on a 2021 stamp of her birth country, the Philippines
- Born: September 15, 1971 (age 55); Cebu City, Cebu, Philippines
- Known for: Fashion designer and creative director
- Spouse: Tom Bugbee (m. 1996)
- Children: 2
- Father: Michel Lhuillier
- Website: www.moniquelhuillier.com

Monique Lhuillier (born September 15, 1971) is a Filipino fashion designer and creative director known for her bridal, ready-to-wear and lifestyle brand. She launched her eponymous brand in 1996 and has since established fashion houses in Los Angeles, California, where she primarily works and lives, as well as in Manhattan's Upper East Side.

== Early life and education ==
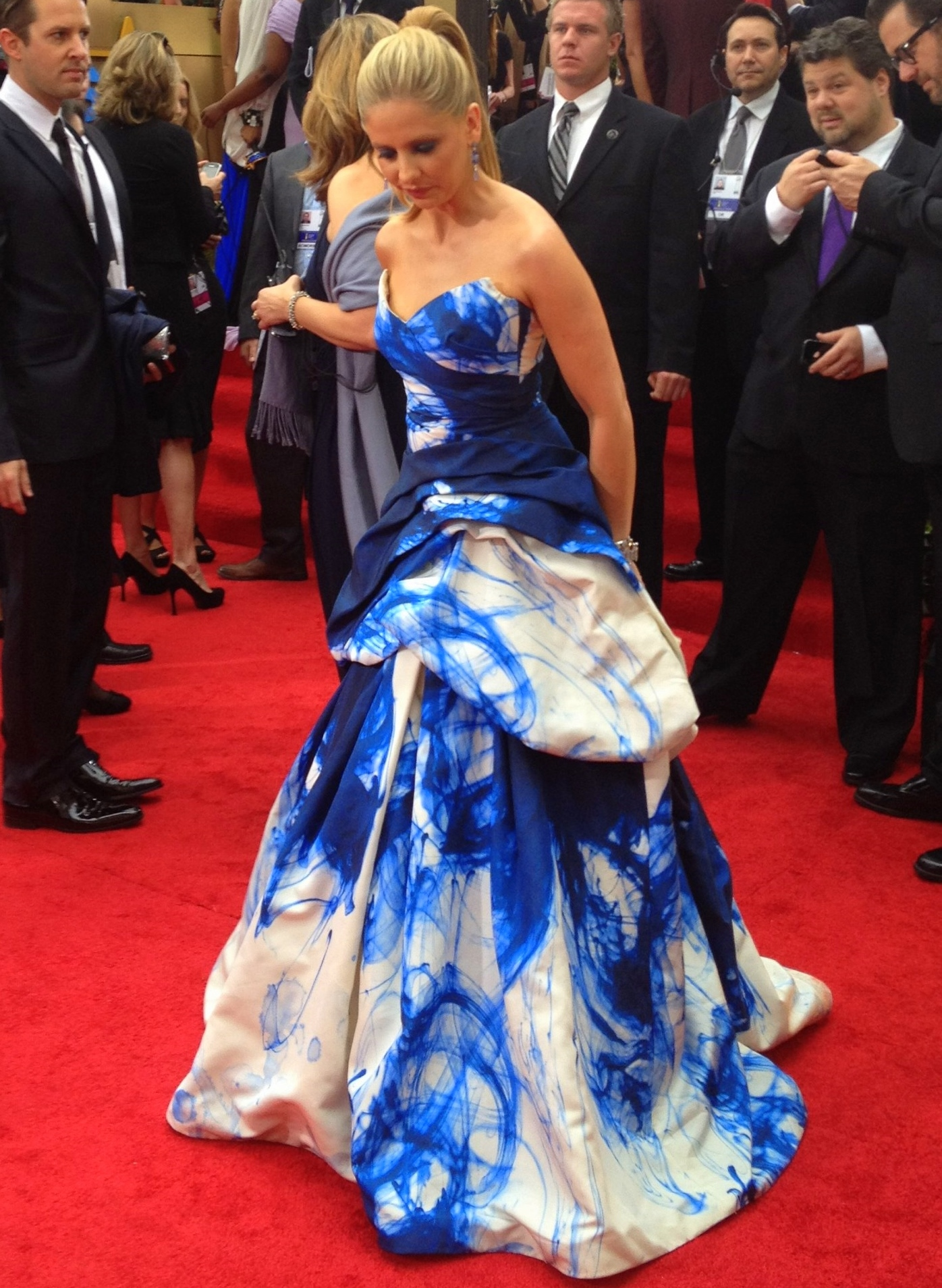
Sarah Michelle Gellar wearing Monique Lhuillier at the 69th Golden Globe Awards in 2012.

Lhuillier was born to Michel Lhuillier, a Filipino businessman and owner of the M Lhuillier chain of pawnshops, and Amparito Llamas, a Filipina society figure and former model. She grew up in Cebu City and studied at Saint Theresa's College, continuing on to the Chateau Mont-Choisi finishing school in Lausanne, Switzerland.

== Career ==
After meeting her husband Tom Bugbee, Lhuillier began planning her wedding, which was her first foray on the bridal market, and thought it needed updating. She could not find any modern dresses, and did not like the excess of lace. She used her fashion degree to create dresses for her relatives and bridal party. After the wedding, there were business cards left for her. It was then when she realized she could make a business out of her beautiful bridal designs. Her husband Tom joined the company as CEO. She opened her first retail store in 2001. In 2004, she drew wide notice for her wedding dresses for Britney Spears and Emmy Awards dresses for Jamie-Lynn DiScala and Allison Janney, among others. She opened a Los Angeles "flagship" store on Melrose Place in 2007, and added a New York store in 2012. Her collections now include ready-to-wear, evening gowns, bridal, bridesmaids, linens, tableware, fine paper, and home fragrances. In 2016, in collaboration with Pottery Barn Kids, Lhuillier launched a line for babies and kids. The collection featured over 120 items of home furnishings for the nursery, bedroom, and playroom.

Lhuillier has become especially known for her celebrity wedding and red carpet gowns. Her list of clientele includes Blake Lively, Demi Lovato, Gwyneth Paltrow, Reese Witherspoon, Michelle Obama, Emma Stone, Jennifer Lopez, Lea Salonga, Taylor Swift, Melania Trump, and Katy Perry.

== Personal life ==
Lhuillier moved to Los Angeles to study design at the Fashion Institute of Design & Merchandising (FIDM). In Los Angeles, she met Tom Bugbee, whom she married in 1995.

== Awards and honors ==
Lhuillier was invited to be a member of the Council of Fashion Designers of America in 2003. She received the Presidential Medal of Merit from the Philippine president Gloria Macapagal Arroyo in 2006.

In 2021, Lhuillier along with nine others were featured in a Philippine postage stamp collection called Living Legends: World-Renowned Filipinos by Philippine Postal Corporation. Other personalities included in the collection are Lea Salonga, Kenneth Cobonpue, Diosdado Banatao, Efren "Bata" Reyes, Rafael "Paeng" Nepomuceno, Eugene Torre, Josie Natori, Jordan Clarkson, and Jollibee.

Exhibition and Bridal Collection: Monique Lhuillier creates wedding gowns for brides looking for a statement-making gown. Monique Lhuillier's gowns are known for their bold ruffles, romantic florals, and clean, simple silhouettes.

Monique Lhuilier's Grace Charity Events: Lhuillier has been associated with Baby2Baby, a nonprofit organization that provides basic essentials to children living in poverty. At one of the organization's fundraising events, Baby2Baby raised over $12 million, with the evening honoring Kim Kardashian. Among those in attendance were actresses Maria Menounos, Alexandra Daddario, and Alessandra Ambrosio, several of whom wore Lhuillier designs.

The Brand: Her signature design sensibility has resulted in the launch of numerous licensed collections, including Monique Lhuillier & Pottery Barn, Monique Lhuillier & Pottery Barn Kids, and Monique Lhuillier & Pottery Barn Teen. Monique Lhuillier's contemporary collection, fine jewelry, lingerie, wedding invitations, signature and home fragrance, and signature and home fragrance have transformed the company into a luxury lifestyle brand. Monique Lhuillier products are sold in Monique Lhuillier stores, premium department stores, and specialty stores worldwide. Monique and Tom live in Los Angeles with their two children, Jack and Sophia. Monique's career in fashion is enriched by her strong dedication to family and commitment to philanthropic efforts such as Baby2Baby and BCRF, to name a few.
