= Bea Lucero =

Filipino gymnast and taekwondo practitioner (born 1972)

Personal information
- Full name: Beatriz Lucero-Lhuillier
- Nationality: Filipino
- Born: December 2, 1972 (age 53)
- Spouse: Jean Henri Lhuillier
- Children: 4

Sport
- Country: Philippines
- Sport: Artistic gymnastics (until 1987); Taekwondo (from 1989)
Medal record
Women's artistic gymnastics
Representing Philippines
| Event | 1st | 2nd | 3rd |
|---|---|---|---|
| SEA Games | 3 | 4 | 0 |
| Total | 3 | 4 | 0 |
Women's taekwondo
Representing Philippines
Asian Championships
| Bronze medal – third place | 1992 Kuala Lumpur | Featherweight |

Beatriz Lucero-Lhuillier is a Filipino former gymnast and taekwondo practitioner. She won a bronze medal at the 1992 Summer Olympics in taekwondo, a demonstration sport at the Games.

== Early life and education ==
Beatriz Lucero was born on December 2, 1972, to Tony and Leana Lucero. Her father is a lawyer while her mother is a teacher. Bea Lucero has a brother and a sister. Lucero studied at the International School Manila. After taking part in the 1992 Oylmpics, Lucero went on to focus on her studies at the University of the Philippines earning a communications degree.

== Career ==
=== Gymnastics ===
Bea Lucero took up gymnastics when she was six years old, after witnessing other girls at the gymnasium at her school.

She later became a competitive artistic gymnast representing the Philippines internationally. She won a gold and a silver at the 1985 SEA Games in Bangkok. This was followed by two golds and three silver in the 1987 edition in 1987 edition in Jakarta.

Lucero failed to qualify for the 1988 Summer Olympics in Seoul, attributed to a leadership dispute within the Gymnastics Association of the Philippines. Her non-participation at the 1987 World Artistic Gymnastics Championships was a factor, although Philippine Olympic Committee president Jose Sering petitioned for a wild card. Lucero retired from competitive gymnastics at age 15.

=== Taekwondo ===
Lucero switched from gymnastics to taekwondo and trained under the tutulege of Hong Sung-chon, the vice president of the Philippine Taekwondo Association at the time since 1989.

She garnered the featherweight bronze at the 1992 Asian Taekwondo Championships in Kuala Lumpur. Later at the 1992 Summer Olympics in Barcelona, she won a bronze medal in the featherweight division in taekwondo after losing to Ayşegül Ergin of Turkey in the semifinals. Her medal was not included in the official tally because it was a demonstration sport.

=== Wushu ===
Lucero also took up wushu. She joined the national trials for the 2005 SEA Games in Manila where she and a teammate was eliminated.

== In television ==
Lucero appeared in various television commercials as a young teenage athlete. This include Milo, doing her first commercial for the chocolate malt drink brand at age 12. She is also part of the cast of The Children's Hour in the late 1980s at ABS-CBN. At the 1988 Summer Olympics, she covered the gymnastics event for the People's Television Network.

She also hosted a talk show Teen Talk which aired on GMA Network from 1993 - 1995; her co-host was RJ Ledesma.

== Personal life ==
Bea Lucero is married to Jean Henri Lhuillier, the president and CEO of Cebuana Lhuillier. She is a mother of three boys and a girl. Bea was among the audience in gymnast Carlos Yulo's campaign in the Paris Olympics in 1987.

== Honors ==
Lucero was inducted to the Philippine Sports Hall of Fame in May 2026 for her achievements in gymnastics and taekwondo.
