= Jean Henri Lhuillier =

Filipino businessman

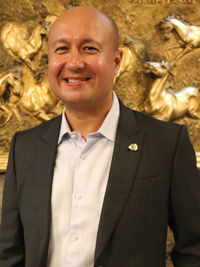
- Born: Jean Henri Diago Lhuillier; 1969 (age 56–57)
- Occupation: Businessman
- Known for: President and CEO of PJ Lhuillier
- Spouse: Bea Lucero (m. 1998)
- Children: 4
- Father: Philippe Lhuillier

Jean Henri Diago Lhuillier (Tagalog pronunciation: [ˈluljɪɾ], born 1969) is a Filipino businessman, diplomat and sports patron. He is the president and CEO of the PJ Lhuillier Group of Companies, which operates and manages Cebuana Lhuillier.

== Education ==
Jean Henri Lhuillier was born to Philippe Lhuillier and Edna Diago. He has six other siblings.

He attended Colegio de San Agustin and later, at the PAREF Southridge School in Muntinlupa. He later went to the United States to attend a boarding school in Palo Alto, California, the Woodside Priory School. He then went on to study at the Saint Mary’s College in Moraga obtaining a degree in economics and business administration. He was part of the Saint Mary's Gaels tennis team until his junior year. In 1992, Lhuillier took up studies in gemology in Los Angeles in preparation for managing the family business. He resided in the United States for 12 years.

== Career ==
=== Business ===
==== Lhuillier Stoneworks ====
While still studying in Moraga, Lhuillier ran the 40-employee Lhuillier Stoneworks a marble fabrication business which served Northern California and had a showroom in San Francisco. He was not able to adequetly supervised the business, having to frequently travel from Manila and the United States and back and communicating primarily through fax.

==== PJ Lhuillier ====
Lhuillier returned to the Philippines to work at the family business, PJ Lhuillier Inc. which operated the pawnshop chain Cebuana Lhuillier after being convinced by his father. He did not start with an executive position. When Philippe Lhuillier took the role as the Philippine ambassador to Italy in 1998, the younger Lhuillier took over the company.

=== Diplomacy ===
Lhuillier was appointed as the inaugural honorary consul of San Marino's general consulate to the Philippines which was established in 2007.

== Personal life ==
Lhuillier married Bea Lucero in 1998, a gymnast and taekwondo athlete who won a bronze medal at the 1992 Summer Olympics in Barcelona when taekwondo was held as a demonstration event. They have four children. He has roots in Cebu although he was not born in the province.
