= Mayoral Gallery =

Art gallery in Barcelona, Spain

Coordinates: 41.3895°N 2.16391°E

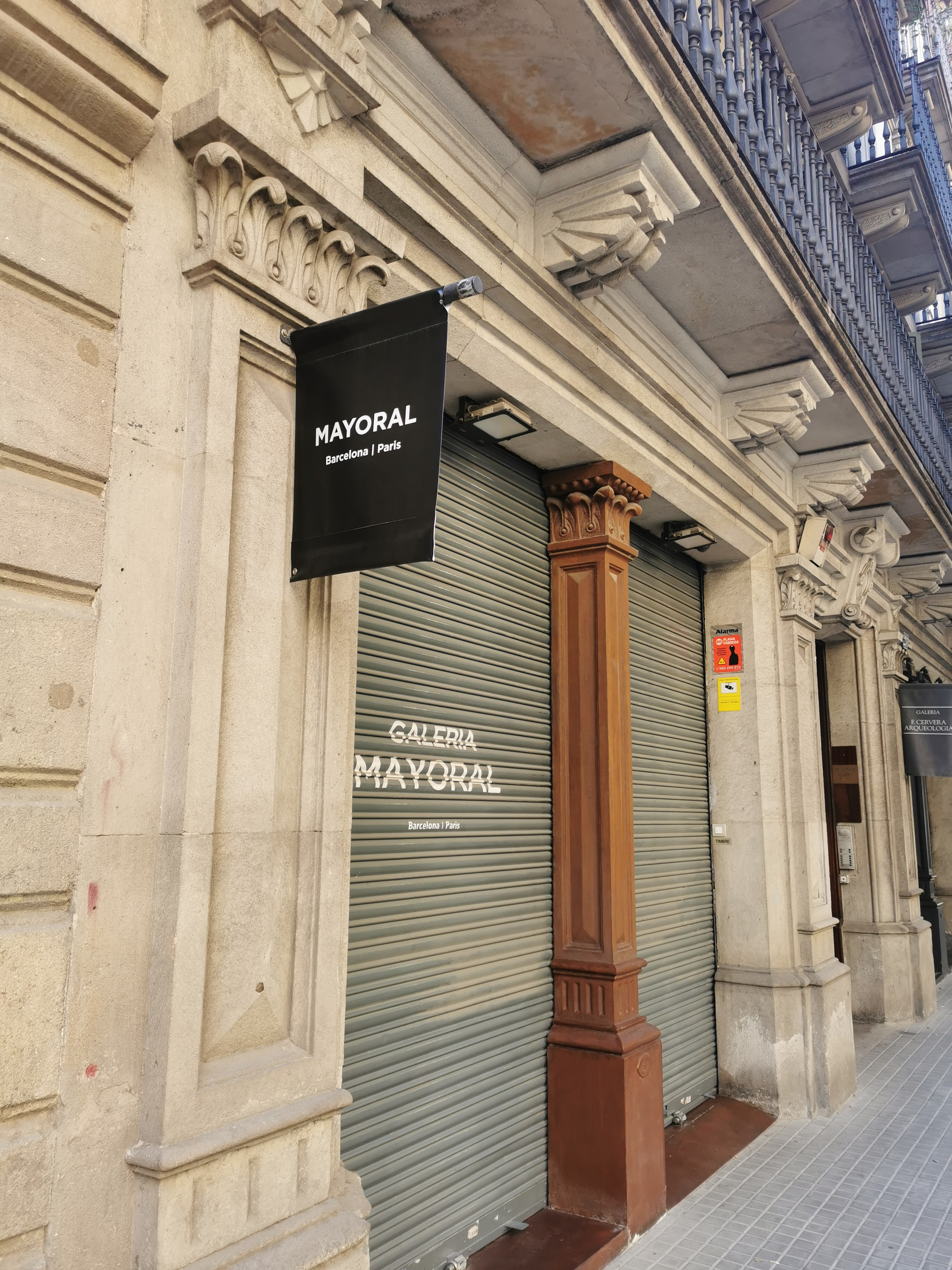
Exterior of the Galeria Mayoral in Barcelona

The Galeria Mayoral (English: Mayoral Gallery) was launched in Barcelona, Spain in 1989. The gallery has two types of exhibitions: collective shows based on a specific theme and solo exhibitions of the work of artists that are especially relevant to the history of twentieth-century and early twenty-first century.

The gallery has done exhibitions of Miró, Dalí and Picasso's work and has been exposed to Botero, Calder, Chagall, Chillida, Léger, Tàpies, and Barceló, Plensa.

The gallery participates in worldwide art fairs in Basel Hong Kong, The Armory Show New York, Art Miami, PAD London, Masterpiece London, Biennale des Antiquaires.
