= José Manuel Stilianopoulos =

José Manuel Stilianopoulos y Estela (sometimes known as Mike Stilianopoulos) (22 September 1930 – 4 November 2016) was a Philippine ambassador to Britain. He was appointed by President Ferdinand Marcos as the seventh Ambassador to the United Kingdom of Great Britain and Northern Ireland, a position he held from 1977 to 1982.

== Biography ==
Stilianopoulos was born in Manila, Philippines, on September 22, 1930, to Doña Ana Estela and Don Carlos Stilianopoulos, a Greek businessman. He was the grandson of a Spanish businessman, Don Miguel Estela. Stilianopoulos was also the uncle of Mystique model Hilda Estela Garchitorena.

He was married, on June 24, 1957, to Doña Esperanza Ridruejo (17 December 1930 – 6 May 2019), also known as Pitita. During his tenure as Ambassador, the couple owned a secluded villa near the resort of Marbella, Spain, which saw them come under the media spotlight in 1979, when Princess Margaret stayed at the villa with Roddy Llewellyn, as she renewed the relationship that had earlier ceased during her marriage to Antony Armstrong-Jones. Within their social circle, including Princess Margaret, they were known simply as Mike and Pitita.

After a very long time being Ambassador in several countries in Europe he settled down in Spain. Mike and Pitita lived in downtown Madrid since the 80s. They were the parents of the Spanish artist Claudia Stilianopoulos.

After suffering from chronic obstructive pulmonary disease, he died on November 4, 2016, in Madrid.
