= M Lhuillier =

Philippine non-banking financial services company

M Lhuillier Financial Services

- MLhuillier Cebu Office
- Type: Private
- Founded: 1992 (incorporation)
- Founder: Michel Lhuillier
- Headquarters: Cebu City, Philippines
- Key people: Michel Lhuillier (Chairman); Michael Lhuillier (President & CEO)
- Website: mlhuillier.com

Michel J. Lhuillier Financial Services (Pawnshops), Inc., also known as M Lhuillier or MLhuillier, is a Philippine non-banking financial services company. The company is headquartered in Cebu City, Philippines with the M Lhuillier Group of companies as the parent company.

== History ==
M. Lhuillier was established by Michel Lhuillier in the early 1980s as an offshoot of the financial services of Michel's father, Henry Lhuillier a French emigrant to the Philippines. The company, Michel J. Lhuillier Financial Services (Pawnshops), Inc., was incorporated by the younger Lhuillier in 1992.

Since then, the M Lhuillier Group of Companies expanded to include real estate, construction, restaurants, and retail.
