= Cebuana Lhuillier =

Filipino pawnshop brand

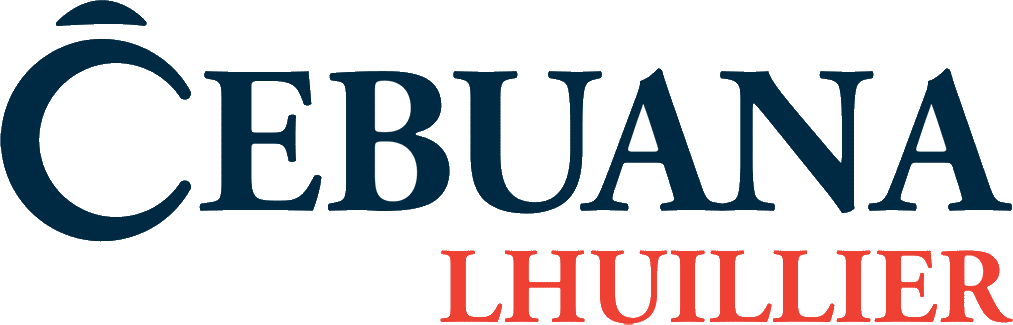
- Type: Private
- Founded: 1953 (as Agencia); 1987 (as Lhuillier)
- Headquarters: Makati, Metro Manila, Philippines
- Key people: Philippe Jones Lhullier (Chairman); Jean Henri D. Lhuillier (President & CEO)
- Website: www.cebuanalhuillier.com

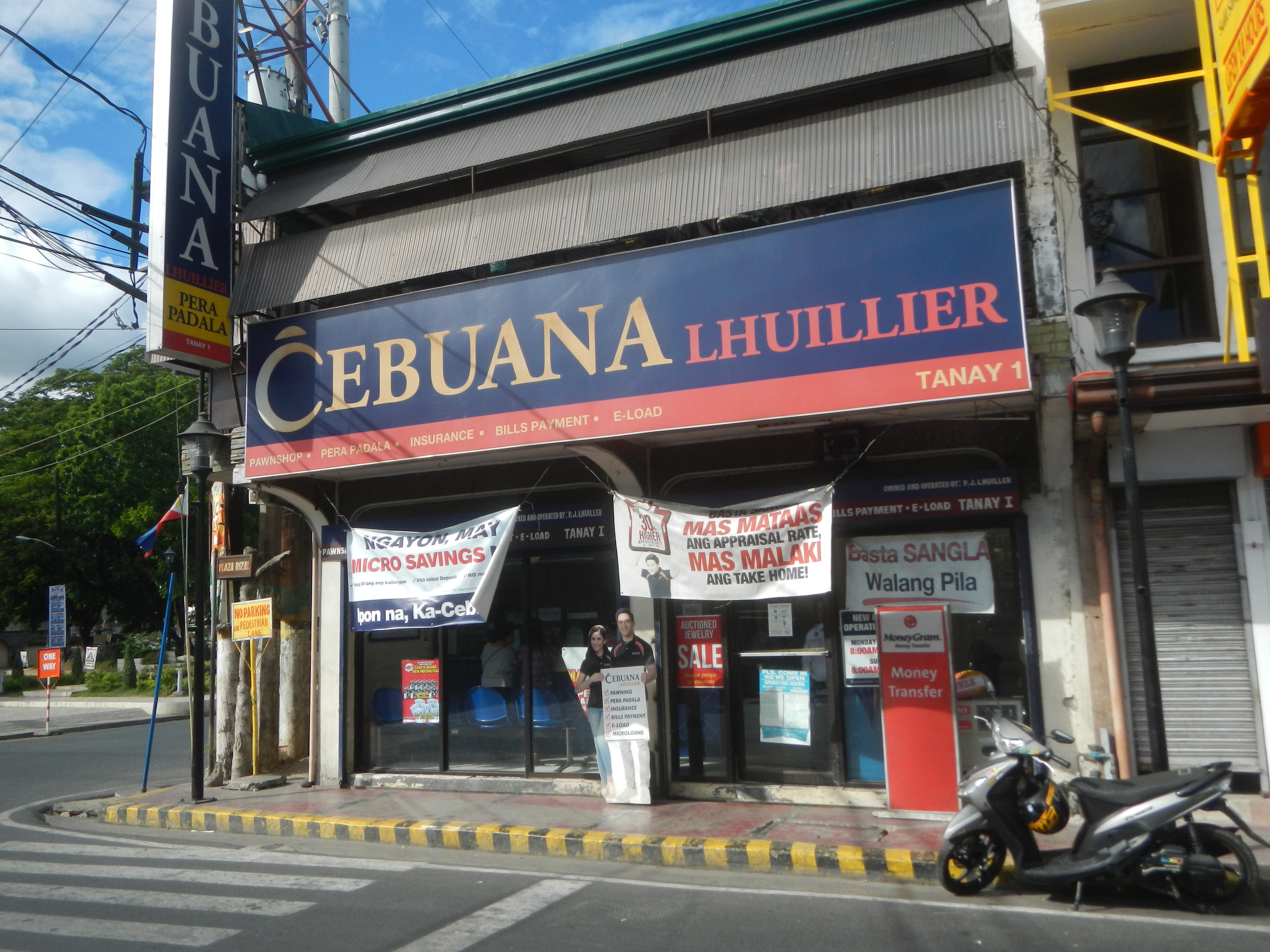
A Cebuana Lhuillier branch in Tanay, Rizal

Cebuana Lhuillier Pawnshop (formerly known as Agencia Cebuana), commonly known as Cebuana, is a Philippine-based pawnshop and the flagship brand of PJ Lhuillier Group of Companies. Jean Henri Lhuillier is the current President and CEO of Cebuana.

Cebuana Lhuillier is a banking financial institution offering services such as pawn-broking, money remittance, insurance, bills payment, remit-to-account, corporate payout, collections, and e-loading. It is headquartered in Makati.

== History ==
Cebuana Lhuillier was established under the trade name Agencia Cebuana in 1953 by French emigrant Henry Lhuillier. The first outlet was set up in Cebu. His son Philippe later opened his first Lhuillier pawnshop at Libertad Street in Pasay.

The chain adopted the name "Cebuana Lhuillier" in 1987 and pursued further nationwide expansion starting in 1990.

When Philippe Lhuillier took the role as the Philippine ambassador to Italy in 1998, his son Jean Henri took over the company. Within the same year, the Cebuana Lhuillier (CL) Bank was established as the rural bank under the PJ Lhuillier Group.

== Involvement in sports ==
The firm owns several teams in the PBA D-League (Cebuana Lhuillier Gems), Metropolitan Basketball Association (Cebu Gems) & Philippine Basketball League (Lhuillier Jewelers). CL has also organised tennis tournaments such as Cebuana Lhuillier Age Group Tennis.
