= Philippe Lhuillier =

Filipino diplomat, businessman and philanthropist

Philippe Jones Lhuillier
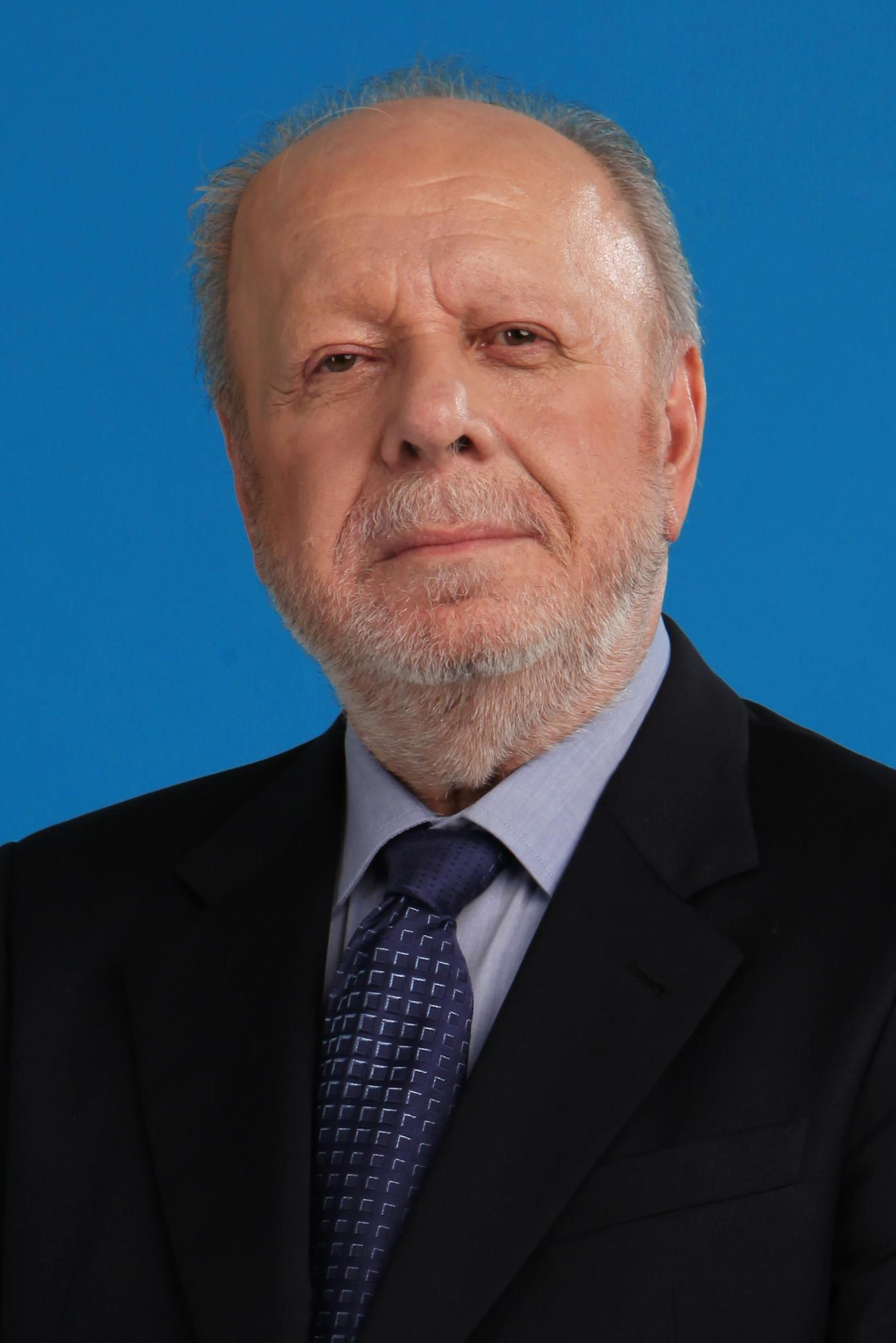
- Official portrait, 2017

Ambassador of the Philippines to Spain
- Incumbent
- Assumed office April 7, 2017
- President: Rodrigo Duterte; Bongbong Marcos
- Preceded by: Carlos C. Salinas

Personal details
- Born: Philippe Jones Lhuillier; July 23, 1945 (age 81) Cebu City
- Spouse: Edna Villanueva Diago
- Children: 7 including Jean
- Education: De La Salle University (B.S.)
- Occupation: Businessman
- Profession: Diplomat

Philippe Jones Lhuillier KCR (born July 23, 1945) is a Filipino diplomat, businessman and philanthropist. He is the current Philippine ambassador to Spain. From 1999 to 2010, he was the ambassador to Italy and the chairman of the Philippines' largest pawnshop chain, Cebuana Lhuillier. He was born to the late Henry Lhuillier and the late Angelita Escaño Jones.

== Education ==
Philippe graduated with a bachelor of science degree in management from De La Salle University, Manila and received a diploma in gemology from the International Gemological Institute of Antwerp in 1970 and the Gemological Institute of America in 1971.

== Career ==
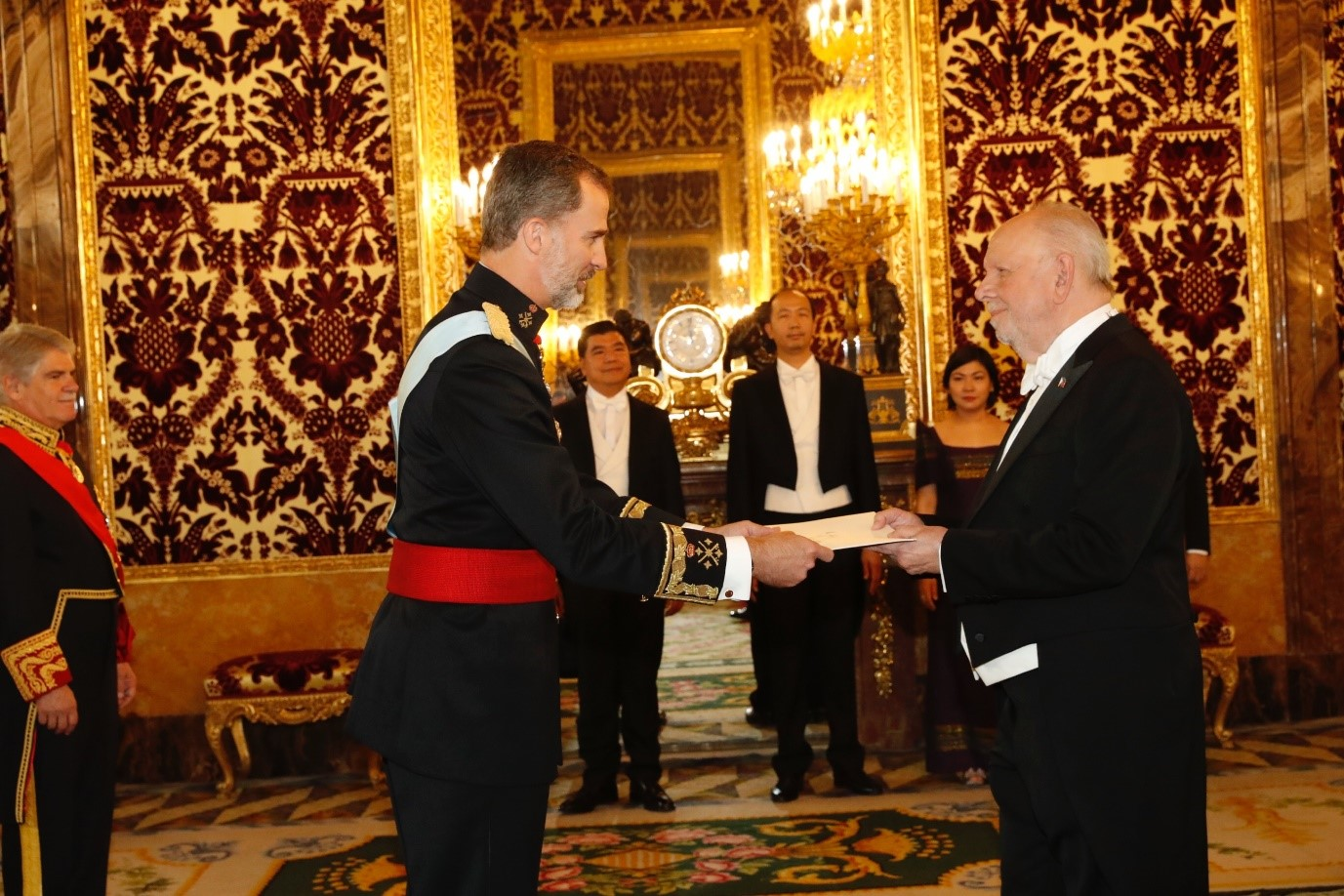
Philippe Lhuillier presented his credentials to King Felipe VI in Royal Palace of Madrid, Spain, 2017

Before being assigned to Spain in 2017, Philippe Lhuillier was the Philippine ambassador to Italy in 1999, Albania in 2000, San Marino in 2003 (where he was the first Philippine ambassador to that country), and to Portugal from 2012 to 2016.

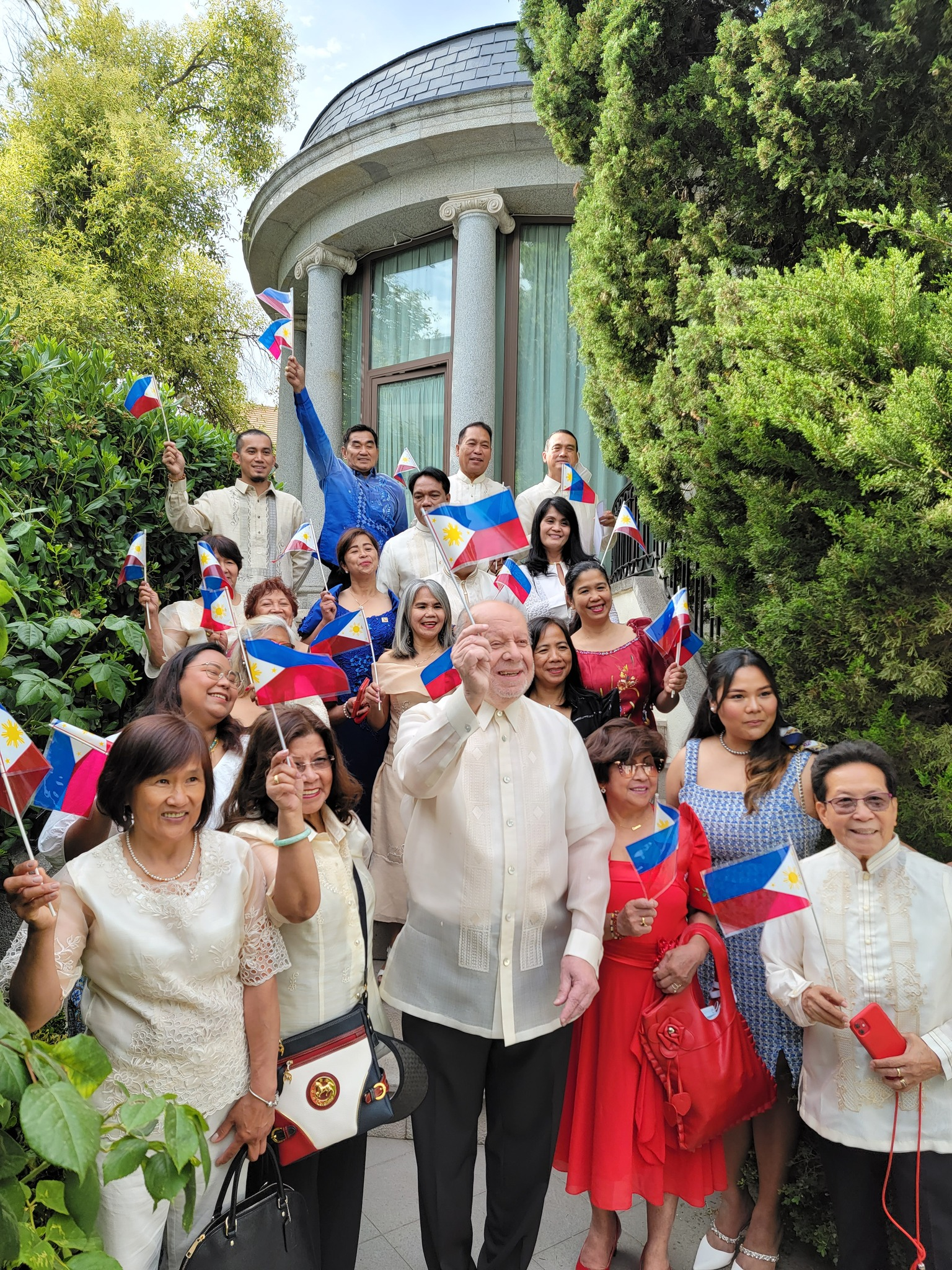
Ambassador Philippe Lhuillier with the Filipino community in Spain celebrating Independence Day, 2022

== Awards and recognition ==
Lhuillier receive numerous awards for his work. He was awarded by the government of the Republic of Italy with the Order of the Star of Italian Solidarity Award for his significant achievement in fostering goodwill between Italy and the Philippines. The order is bestowed through a decree by Italy’s President through the recommendation of the Ministry of Foreign Affairs. It is the highest Italian award given to foreigners as well as Italians living abroad. Amb. Lhuillier was conferred the Order of Rajah Humabon by Cebu City on its 73rd Charter Anniversary on February 24, 2010 for promoting economic development and tourism. In 2008, he was unanimously selected as one of the Twenty Outstanding Filipinos Abroad (TOFA) for his promoting the image of Filipinos while serving his post as Philippine ambassador to Italy, Albania and San Marino. De la Salle University awarded him the Distinguished La Sallian Award for his record as Ambassador to Italy and his assistance to the Filipino OFWs. The University of the Philippines also honored him by naming one of its lecture rooms as Ambassador Philippe J. Lhuillier Lecture Room. On April 16, 2010, Saint Louis University conferred on Ambassador Philippe J. Lhuillier the degree of Doctor of Humanities, honoris causa. On November 24, 2018, Lhillier was conferred the Order of the Knights of Rizal with the rank of Knight Commander of Rizal (KCR) at the Embassy of the Philippines in Madrid, Spain.

== Personal life ==
Philippe is married to Edna Villanueva Diago, daughter of sugar planter from Bais, Negros Oriental. They have seven children including, Jean Henri Lhuillier.

Outside of his career as a diplomat and a businessman, Ambassador Lhuillier is an art collector and philanthropist.
