= Embassy of the Philippines, The Hague =

Diplomatic mission of the Philippines in the Netherlands

Embassy of the Philippines, The Hague Pasuguan ng Pilipinas sa La Haya Ambassade van de Filipijnen in Den Haag

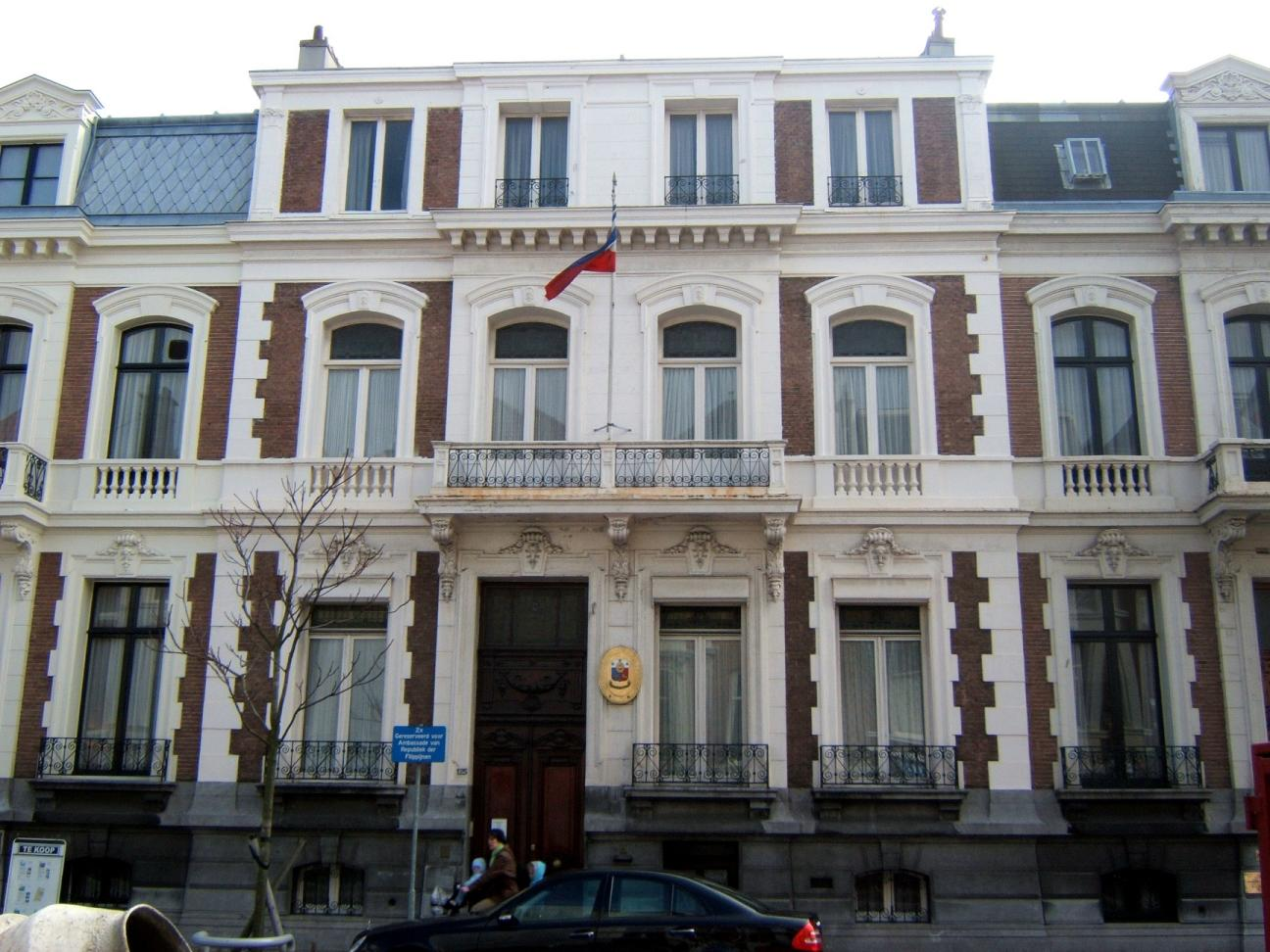
- Location: The Hague
- Address: Laan Copes van Cattenburch 125
- Coordinates: 52°05′29.7″N 4°18′27.6″E
- Ambassador: Jose Eduardo E. Malaya III
- Website: Official website

Rijksmonument
- Designated: July 22, 1994
- Reference no.: 476043

The Embassy of the Philippines in The Hague is the diplomatic mission of the Republic of the Philippines to the Kingdom of the Netherlands. First opened in 1959, it is located in the Archipelbuurt neighborhood of The Hague's city center, where it has been since 1968.

== History ==
Although the Philippines and the Netherlands established diplomatic relations on May 17, 1951, a diplomatic mission was not immediately opened in The Hague. Relations between the two countries were initially conducted through the Philippine Legation in Paris, which was ultimately under the jurisdiction of the Philippine Embassy in Madrid, and with former Senator Proceso Sebastián serving as the Philippines' first diplomat to be accredited to the Netherlands.

A resident legation would not open until 1959, during the presidency of Carlos P. Garcia, with Nicanor Roxas, who previously served in various executive posts in government, becoming the mission's first resident minister. The following year, the mission was elevated to a full embassy with the promotion of Roxas to ambassador, and he presented his credentials to Queen Juliana on May 27, 1960.

During the run-up to the People Power Revolution in 1986, staff members of the Embassy announced that they would support Corazon Aquino as president following the results of that year's presidential election, although Consul General Aladin Villacorte, who was the mission's second-in-command at the time, declined to state the position of Ambassador Jose Plana on the matter.

== Chancery ==
The chancery of the Philippine Embassy in The Hague was designed by architect Jan Hendrik van Sluijters, and built between 1871 and 1872.

Purchased by the Philippine government in 1968 during the ambassadorship of Delfin R. Garcia, the three-story French eclectic-style townhouse along Laan Copes van Cattenburch has 13 rooms, a basement and a parking area in the rear. The building is particularly known for its façade, with large windows across all three floors and well-preserved eclectic-era architectural features, and its richly decorated original interiors.

Regarded as a representative example of a residence in the eclectic style, the property was declared a historical landmark by the city government of The Hague in May 1990 due to its historical value, and was later listed as a rijksmonument on July 22, 1994, alongside two neighboring adjacent townhouses which were similarly built, one of which is also in current use as a chancery—specifically that of the Royal Thai Embassy.

A comprehensive renovation of the Chancery was undertaken in late 2021 to early 2022 during the term of Ambassador Malaya, following the guidelines of The Hague’s heritage building office Monumentenzorg Den Haag. It preserved the building’s numerous heritage elements which included a front facade made of brick with a high panel door with stained glass windows, and a main entrance featuring rich neo-Louis XVI style carvings and brass knobs.

The renovated building chancery was inaugurated on 7 June 2022 in ceremonies led by Bishop Johannes Hendriks of the Roman Catholic Diocese of Haarlem-Amsterdam, with Director Dominique Kuhling, Chief of Protocol of The Netherlands’ Ministry of Foreign Affairs, Ms. Irene Flotman, Chief Operating Officer of the contractor CBRE, and Ambassador Malaya.

The renovation involved a major re-layout of the ground floor which now features a large reception hall, which has a 60-person sitting capacity. It has been used as venue for meetings and conferences as well as for trade, tourism and art exhibits and cultural performances. The consular section has also been allotted a larger reception and staff working areas.

On 19 July 2022, the Embassy dedicated a sitting room at the ground floor of the Chancery as ICJ Judge Cesar Bengzon Hall in honor of the Filipino Judge who served in the International Court of Justice (ICJ) from 1967 to 1976. Also honored at said hall are two other prominent Filipino jurists in international law—Justice Florentino Feliciano, founding Member and then President of the Appellate Body of the World Trade Organization; and Raul C. Pangalangan, Judge of the International Criminal Court.

A bust monument of the Philippines’ national hero, Jose Rizal, was unveiled at the courtyard of the Embassy on 4 July 2023. The Rizal Bust was donated by the Knights of Rizal-The Hague Chapter, which was sculpted by an artist in Angeles, Pampanga.

The Embassy celebrated the chancery's 50th anniversary on October 19, 2018, by meeting with leaders of various Filipino community organizations in the Netherlands.

== Staff and activities ==
The Philippine Embassy in The Hague is headed by Ambassador Jose Eduardo E. Malaya III, who was appointed to the position by President Rodrigo Duterte on September 18, 2020. Prior to his current post, Malaya, a career diplomat, served as Undersecretary for Administration of the Department of Foreign Affairs (DFA), and prior to that headed the Philippine Embassy in Kuala Lumpur as ambassador to Malaysia, where he and two other officials were awarded the Gawad Mabini in 2016 for setting up alternative learning centers for Filipinos and other migrant children in Sabah. His appointment was confirmed by the Commission on Appointments on December 9, 2020, and he presented his credentials to King Willem-Alexander on April 7, 2021.

Many of the embassy's activities involve promoting and strengthening the deep economic and cultural ties that exist between the Philippines and the Netherlands. These include organizing a festival promoting Filipino cuisine as a way to promote Filipino products in the Netherlands, facilitating the translation of José Rizal's and F. Sionil José's novels into Dutch, and promoting the deep maritime relations that exist between the two countries. In addition to those activities, the Embassy is also responsible for ensuring the welfare of the thousands of Filipinos in the Netherlands, which it also does through its honorary consulates in Amsterdam and Rotterdam, and in the Dutch Caribbean, which it assumed jurisdiction over in April 2017 from the Philippine Embassy in Mexico City, and where there is an honorary consulate in Oranjestad, the capital of Aruba.

A famous Filipino who lived within the Embassy's jurisdiction was Jose Maria Sison, leader of the Communist Party of the Philippines. During Malaya's confirmation hearing, Foreign Affairs Secretary Teodoro Locsin Jr. said that the DFA would not enforce an outstanding arrest warrant against Sison should he had chosen to visit the Embassy as it would be an embarrassment to the dignity and honor of the Philippine foreign service, also citing existing United States Department of State policy against the practice.

== See also ==
- Netherlands–Philippines relations
- Filipinos in the Netherlands
- List of diplomatic missions of the Philippines
