= Filipinos in Belgium =

Total population
- 12,224 (2012 est.)

Regions with significant populations
- Brussels, Flanders

Languages
- English, Filipino, other languages of the Philippines, Dutch, French

Religion
- Roman Catholicism

Related ethnic groups
- Filipino people, Overseas Filipino

Filipinos in Belgium comprise migrants from the Philippines to Belgium and their descendants living there. While the Belgian National Institute of Statistics has 3,067 Filipinos officially registered, the Commission on Filipinos Overseas (CFO) estimated that there are 12,224 Filipinos in Belgium in December 2013.

== Demographics ==
Filipinos in Belgium work primarily as tradesmen, in the hospitality industry, as domestic workers, or as seamen on Belgian-flagged ships. A number of Filipino international students also attend Belgian institutions of higher education, but are considered "temporary migrants." Gender-wise, most Filipinos in Belgium are female, amounting to roughly 60% of the population.

The Philippine Embassy in Belgium considers "limited employment opportunities, illegal residency status and fraudulent documentation" to be the largest issues facing the Filipino community in Belgium. Of the 12,224 Filipinos estimated to be living in Belgium, the CFO estimates that 5,000 (40.9%) are "irregular" or living without legal residency status, while 6,840 (56.0%) and 384 (3.1%) Filipinos have "permanent" and "temporary" status, respectively.

== Economics ==
In 2012, Filipinos in Belgium officially sent a total of approximately US$62.0 million in remittances back to the Philippines (US$32.3 land-based and US$19.8 sea-based), after a peak of US$63.4 million in remittances in 2010. This figure accounts for 0.28% of all remittances sent to the Philippines. Three Filipino banks have correspondent accounts with banks in Norway to allow for remittance transfers.

== Society and culture ==
In addition to the Philippine Embassy in Brussels and a consulate in Antwerp, there are about seventy Filipino associations in Belgium to serve different needs of the Filipino-Belgian community, many of which are coordinated by the Council of Filipino Associations in Belgium (COFAB) or the Council of Filipino Associations in Flanders (COFAF). There are general regional-based, sporting, service-oriented, and cultural organizations, as well as organizations for native Belgians married to Filipino spouses. In addition, there are four chapters of the Knights of Rizal, a fraternal organization.

The Philippine Embassy in Brussels organizes events around major Filipino holidays, including the Philippine Independence Day and Christmas, that attract thousands of Filipinos from Belgium and neighboring nations such as Luxembourg.

== Notable people ==
- José Alejandrino, Filipino general; studied at the University of Ghent
- Jeffrey Christiaens, footballer
- Angeline Flor Pua, Miss Belgium 2018
- Racso Jugarap, Wire artist
- José Rizal, Filipino revolutionary; lived for a period in Belgium, where he published El filibusterismo
- Roxanne Allison Baeyens, actress, model and Miss Philippines Earth 2020
- Pauline Cucharo Amelinckx, model and Miss Supranational Philippines 2023

== See also ==
- Belgium–Philippines relations
- Filipino diaspora
- Immigration to Belgium
- Filipinos in France
- Filipinos in Germany
- Filipinos in the Netherlands
