= Baloise Art Prize =

Annual art prize

- Awarded for: Outstanding artwork by a young artist at Art Basel
- Country: Switzerland
- Presented by: Baloise Group
- First award: 1999
- Website: baloiseart.com

The Baloise Art Prize is a prize awarded to two people each year at "Art Statements" sector of the international Art Basel fair.

The prize is awarded by the Bâloise group (insurance and banking), a company that works to promote contemporary, emerging art. The Prize has been in existence since 1999. Each winner receives CHF 30,000. The winners' acquired works are then donated to a museum in Germany – either the Hamburger Bahnhof – Museum für Gegenwart in Berlin or the Museum für Moderne Kunst in Frankfurt – and the Mudam (Musée d’Art Moderne Grand-Duc Jean), Luxembourg.

== Prizewinners ==
- 1999 – Laura Owens, Matthew Ritchie
- 2000 – Jeroen de Rijke/Willem de Rooij, Navin Rawanchaikul
- 2001 – Ross Sinclair, Annika Larsson
- 2002 – Cathy Wilkes, John Pilson
- 2003 – Monika Sosnowska, Saskia Olde Wolbers
- 2004 – Aleksandra Mir, Tino Sehgal
- 2005 – Jim Drain, Ryan Gander
- 2006 – Keren Cytter, Peter Piller
- 2007 – Haegue Yang, Andreas Eriksson
- 2008 – Duncan Campbell, Tris Vonna-Michell
- 2009 – Nina Canell, Geert Goiris
- 2010 – Claire Hooper, Simon Fujiwara
- 2011 – Ben Rivers, Alejandro Cesarco
- 2012 – Karsten Födinger, Simon Denny
- 2013 – Jenni Tischer, Kemang Wa Lehulere
- 2014 – John Skoog
- 2015 – Beatrice Gibson, Mathieu Kleyebe Abonnenc
- 2016 – Sara Cwynar, Mary Reid Kelley
- 2017 – Martha Atienza, Sam Pulitzer
- 2018 – Lawrence Abu Hamdan, Suki Seokyeong Kang
- 2019 – Giulia Cenci, Xinyi Cheng
- 2021 – Hana Miletić, Cameron Clayborn
- 2022 – Tourmaline, Helena Uambembe
- 2023 – Sky Hopinka, Sin Wai Kin
- 2024 – Tiffany Sia, Ahmed Umar
- 2025 – Rhea Dillon, Joyce Joumaa

== See also ==
- List of European art awards
