= François Blamont =

French businessman (27 October 1944 – 6 February 2026)

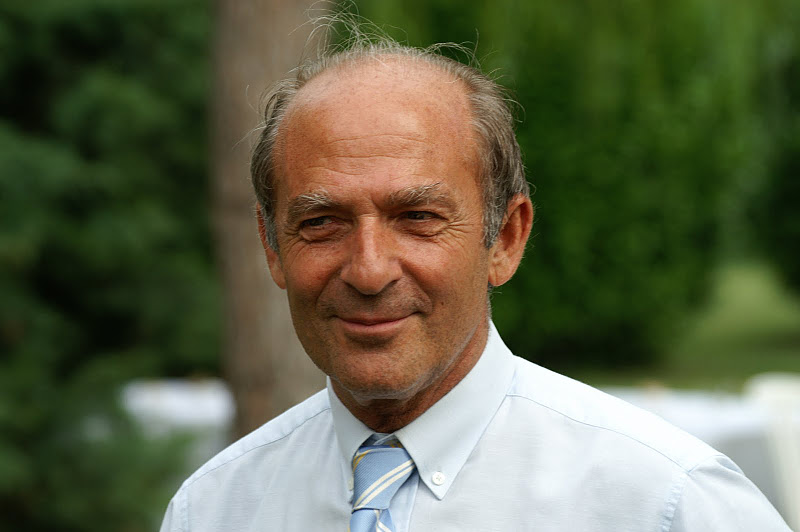
- Blamont in 2014
- Born: 27 October 1944; Mazamet, France
- Died: 6 February 2026 (aged 81); Paris, France
- Occupation: Businessman
- Relatives: Jacques Blamont (brother)
- Awards: Knight of the Legion of Honour (1995); Commander of the National Order of Merit (1991)

François Blamont (French: [fʁɑ̃swˈa blamˈɔ̃]; 27 October 1944 – 6 February 2026) was a French businessman.

Blamont held several high-level roles in both the public and private sector, including as director general of NANE Éditions.

== Life and career ==
Born in Mazamet on 27 October 1944, Blamont was the son of lawyer Émile Katz and the brother of astrophysicist Jacques Blamont.

=== Business ===
==== Hydroponic cultivation center in Kourou ====
In 1966, Blamont developed a hydroponic cultivation center with the cooperation of the Institut de Recherches Agronomiques Tropicales (IRAT) to supply fresh vegetables to the population of the Guiana Space Center in Kourou.

==== Medical industry ====
In 1975, Blamont specialised Sopha Médical, one of the SMEs of the Sopha Développement group of which he was the founder and CEO, in medical technological innovations. This SME was created in 1983 from the acquisition of the company Informatek, a manufacturer of computer systems for interpreting information provided by a gamma-ray-sensitive camera. Sopha Médical was, for some time, the only French company in its sector equipped with technological innovations in the medical industry sector before experiencing a decline. His group became a French leader in hospital engineering, moreover winning the Export Oscar prize in 1982.

==== President of the SODETEG Group ====
In May 1984, Blamont was appointed head of the Société d’Études Techniques et d’Entreprises Générales (SODETEG) by Alain Gomez, president of Thomson, and Noël Goutard, director of the group's Industry branch, in order to implement new industrial, commercial, and financial strategies.

=== Activities in the public sector ===
==== CampusFrance ====
On 6 November 1998, Blamont was appointed chief executive officer of the State agency EduFrance (now Campus France) by the Minister of National Education, Research and Technology, Claude Allègre, the Minister of Foreign Affairs, Hubert Védrine, and the Minister Delegate for Cooperation and Francophonie, Charles Josselin. This agency, in the legal form of a Public Interest Grouping (GIP), aimed to promote French higher-education offerings, in association with the higher-education institutions that wished to participate. His appointment was the subject of critical commentary.

==== Embassy of France in Iraq and the Philippines ====
In September 2002, Blamont was appointed to the post of Counselor for Cooperation and Cultural Action in Baghdad to the French Interests Section in Iraq by the Ministry of Foreign Affairs. He held this position until 2004. In September 2004, he was called to the French Embassy in the Philippines, also as Counselor for Cooperation and Cultural Action. He remained there until August 2006.

==== Conservatoire national des arts et métiers ====
Between 2009 and 2013, Blamont joined the Conservatoire national des arts et métiers (CNAM) chair of economics and management of health services directed by Jean de Kervasdoué.

=== Death ===
Blamont died in Paris on 6 February 2026, at the age of 81.

== Publications ==
Throughout his career, Blamont defended ideas in the fields of business, health and medical technologies, and education by publishing his reflections in books and national weeklies. Les Aventures d'un Entrepreneur is a book of experiences and reflections on exports, research, education, training, and industrial policy through a personal journey. As president of exporting companies, beginning in the 1985s, Blamont became involved in supporting SMEs with strong economic potential, as evidenced by his presidency of Sopha Développement. He defended new exporters who support globalism, those whose activity is international trade and whose market is the entire world. He therefore called for a genuine change in administrative procedures to allow these companies to carry out their activities more easily. Drawing on his experience in the medical technology sector, Blamont believed that the biomedical equipment industry must become an important technological and economic partner for the other actors in the world of health. At the time when the Thomson group sold its medical sector (CGR) to General Electric, Blamont proposed the creation of a French medical holding company, which could prove to be a major stake for France like space, aeronautics, and the military. Following his experience as head of the Campus France agency (then EduFrance), he considered that genuine campuses should be created on national soil associated with the countries of the Mediterranean and the BRICS.

== Distinctions ==
- Knight of the Legion of Honour (1995)
- Commander of the Ordre national du Mérite (1991)

== Works ==
- L’ exportation des technologies médicales, un scénario pour réussir : rapport au ministre délégué chargé du commerce extérieu (1988)
- Les aventures d’un entrepreneur (1993)
- Ce que j’ai vu et entendu à Bagdad (2006)
- Entreprendre Autrement (2015)
