= Andreas Eriksson =

Andreas Eriksson may refer to:

- Andreas Eriksson (footballer) (born 1981), Swedish footballer
- Andreas Eriksson (visual artist) (born 1975), Swedish visual artist
