= Chen Xiaodong =

Chen Xiaodong may refer to:

- Chen Xiaodong (fencer)
- Chen Xiaodong (diplomat)
- Daniel Chan, Hong Kong actor and singer with the same Chinese name

== See also ==
- Xiaodong Chen (disambiguation)
