= List of ambassadors of the Philippines to France =

Ambassador of the Republic of the Philippines to the French Republic
- Sugo ng Republika ng Pilipinas sa Republika ng Pransiya; Ambassadeur de la République des Philippines auprès de la République française
- Seal of the Department of Foreign Affairs of the Philippines
- Incumbent; Eduardo Jose A. de Vega since September 1, 2025
- Department of Foreign Affairs; Embassy of the Philippines, Paris
- Style: His Excellency
- Reports to: Department of Foreign Affairs
- Seat: 4, Hameau de Boulainvilliers/45, Rue Du Ranelagh; 75016 Paris, France
- Nominator: Secretary of Foreign Affairs
- Appointer: President of the Philippines; with the advice and consent of the Commission on Appointments
- Term length: No fixed term
- Inaugural holder: Octavio Leopoldo Maloles
- Formation: 1951
- Website: Philippine Embassy, Paris, France

The ambassador of the Republic of the Philippines to the French Republic (Filipino: Sugo ng Republika ng Pilipinas sa Republika ng Pransiya; French: Ambassadeur de la République des Philippines auprès de la République française) is the Republic of the Philippines' foremost diplomatic representative in the French Republic. As head of the Philippines' diplomatic mission there, the ambassador is the official representative of the president and the government of the Philippines to the president and government of France. The position has the rank and status of an ambassador extraordinary and plenipotentiary and is based at the embassy located in Paris' 16th arrondissement. The Philippine ambassador to France is also accredited as non-resident ambassador to the Principality of Monaco, with whom it established formal ties in 2016.

== Head of mission ==
Image	Head of mission	Tenure begins	Tenure ends	French president	French prime minister	Philippine president	Note(s)
	Octavio Leopoldo Maloles	1951	1954	Vincent Auriol; René Coty; Charles de Gaulle	René Pleven; Henri Queuille; Edgar Faure; Antoine Pinay; René Mayer; Joseph Laniel; Pierre Mendès France	Manuel Roxas; Elpidio Quirino; Ramon Magsaysay; Carlos P. Garcia; Diosdado Macapagal	
	Salvador P. Lopez	1955	1962	Vincent Auriol; René Coty; Charles de Gaulle	Pierre Mendès France; Edgar Faure; Guy Mollet; Maurice Bourgès-Maunoury; Félix Gaillard; Pierre Pflimlin; Charles de Gaulle; Michel Debré	Manuel Roxas; Elpidio Quirino; Ramon Magsaysay; Carlos P. Garcia; Diosdado Macapagal	
	Jose Alejandrino	1963	1969	Charles de Gaulle; Alain Poher	Georges Pompidou; Maurice Couve de Murville; Jacques Chaban-Delmas	Diosdado Macapagal; Ferdinand Marcos; Corazon Aquino	
	Luis Salcedo Moreno	1969	1979	Georges Pompidou; Alain Poher; Valéry Giscard d'Estaing	Jacques Chaban-Delmas; Pierre Messmer; Jacques Chirac; Raymond Barre	Diosdado Macapagal; Ferdinand Marcos; Corazon Aquino	
	Felipe Hugo Mabilangan, Jr.	1979	1988	Valéry Giscard d'Estaing; François Mitterrand	Raymond Barre; Pierre Mauroy; Laurent Fabius; Jacques Chirac	Diosdado Macapagal; Ferdinand Marcos; Corazon Aquino	
	Felicidad B. Gonzales	1988	1990	François Mitterrand	Michel Rocard; Édith Cresson; Pierre Bérégovoy; Édouard Balladur	Corazon Aquino; Fidel V. Ramos	
	Rosario Gonzales Manalo	1990	1994	François Mitterrand	Michel Rocard; Édith Cresson; Pierre Bérégovoy; Édouard Balladur	Corazon Aquino; Fidel V. Ramos	
	Rora Navarro Tolentino	1994	1997	François Mitterrand; Jacques Chirac	Édouard Balladur; Alain Juppé; Lionel Jospin	Fidel V. Ramos; Joseph Estrada; Gloria Macapagal Arroyo	
	Hector Kantoy Villaroel	1997	2005	François Mitterrand; Jacques Chirac	Lionel Jospin; Jean-Pierre Raffarin; Dominique de Villepin	Fidel V. Ramos; Joseph Estrada; Gloria Macapagal Arroyo	
	Jose Abeto Zaide	2006	2008	Jacques Chirac; Nicolas Sarkozy	Dominique de Villepin; François Fillon	Gloria Macapagal Arroyo; Benigno Aquino III	
	Rora Navarro Tolentino	2008	2011	Nicolas Sarkozy; François Hollande	François Fillon; Jean-Marc Ayrault; Manuel Valls; Bernard Cazeneuve	Gloria Macapagal Arroyo; Benigno Aquino III	
	Cristina G. Ortega	2011	2014	Nicolas Sarkozy; François Hollande	François Fillon; Jean-Marc Ayrault; Manuel Valls; Bernard Cazeneuve	Benigno Aquino III; Rodrigo Duterte	
	Ma. Theresa P. Lazaro	2014	2020	François Hollande; Emmanuel Macron	Bernard Cazeneuve; Édouard Philippe; Jean Castex; Élisabeth Borne; Gabriel Attal; Michel Barnier; François Bayrou	Benigno Aquino III; Rodrigo Duterte	First Philippine ambassador to present her credentials to the Prince of Monaco. She would later be appointed as the Secretary of Foreign Affairs on July 1, 2025.
	Junever M. Mahilum-West	2021	2025	François Hollande; Emmanuel Macron	Bernard Cazeneuve; Édouard Philippe; Jean Castex; Élisabeth Borne; Gabriel Attal; Michel Barnier; François Bayrou	Rodrigo Duterte; Bongbong Marcos	Credentials were presented to President Macron on November 2, 2021.
	Eduardo Jose A. de Vega	2025	present	Emmanuel Macron	François Bayrou; Sébastien Lecornu	Bongbong Marcos	Appointed by Pres. Bongbong Marcos on November 14, 2024, and confirmed by the Commission of Appointments on February 4, 2025. Credentials were presented to President Macron on September 1, 2025.
Source: Embassy of the Republic of the Philippines, Paris

== See also ==
- France–Philippines relations
- List of ambassadors of France to the Philippines
