= France–Philippines relations =

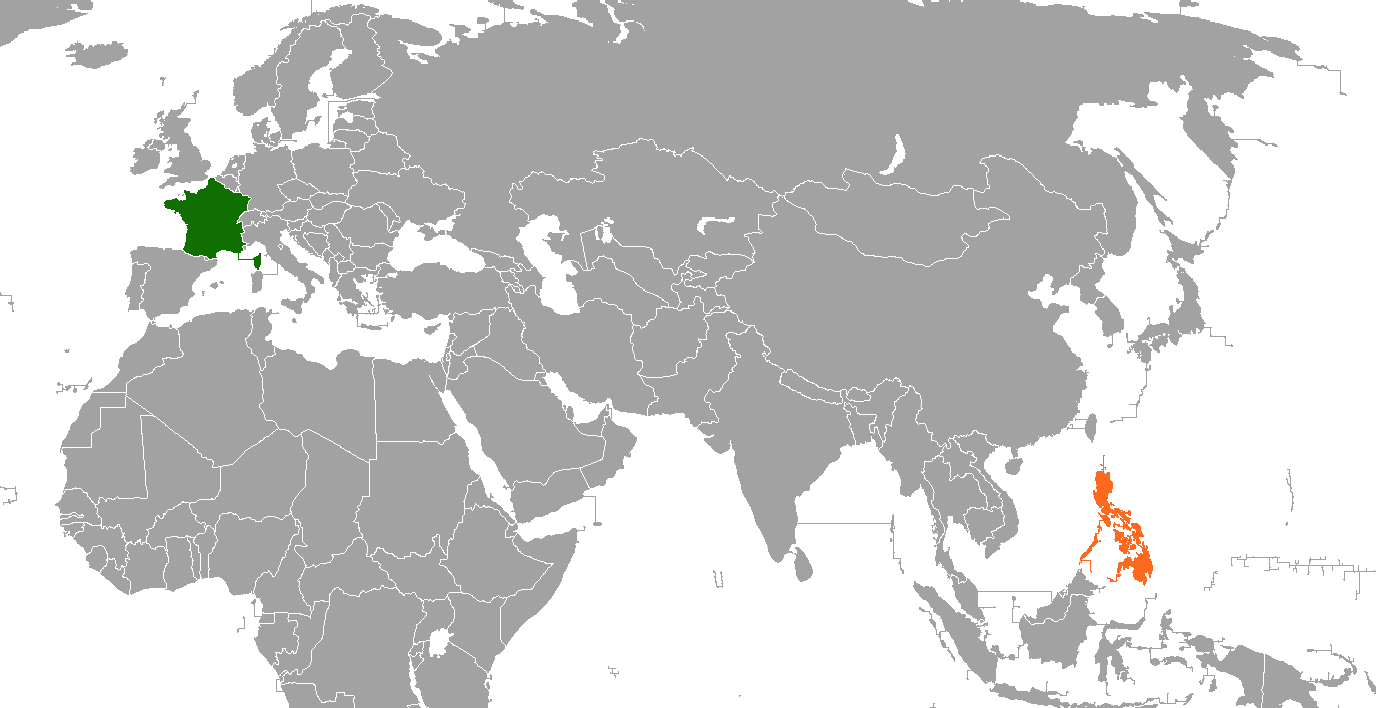

- France: Philippines

Diplomatic mission
- Embassy of France, Manila: Embassy of the Philippines, Paris

Envoy
- Ambassador Marie Fontanel: Ambassador Junever M. Mahilum-West

France–Philippines relations are the foreign relations between France and the Philippines. In 1947, France and the Philippines signed a Treaty of Amity which established diplomatic relations between the two countries. France has an embassy in Makati. The Philippines has an embassy in Paris. Since 2026, the two countries have had a visiting forces agreement in effect.

== History ==
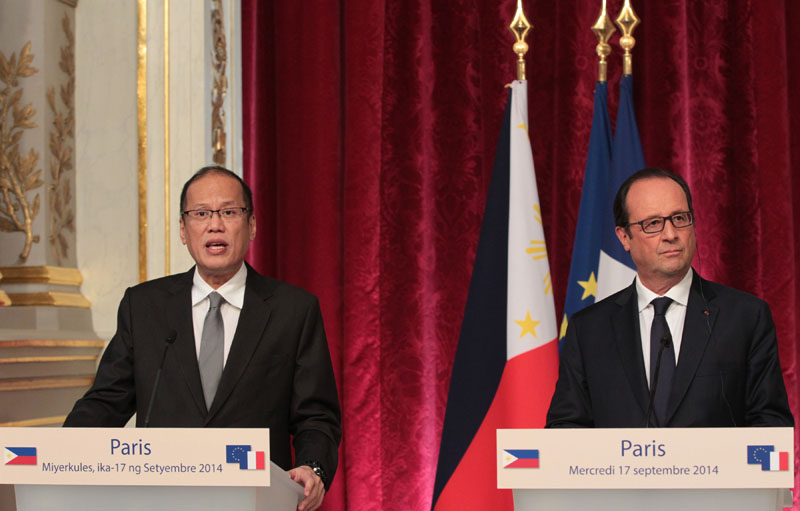
Philippine President Benigno Aquino III and French President François Hollande at the Élysée Palace in Paris, 2014

Indirect interactions between Philippines and France had been present since antiquity. The national symbol of France, the Gallic rooster (French Male Chicken), connects to the Philippines, as the Chicken was domesticated in Southeast Asia, which the Philippines is a part of. However, formal direct relations between France and the Philippines had its roots since the Age of Exploration. When the Spanish expedition under Magellan reached the Philippines, 15 Frenchmen were among its crew. This includes Jean Petit of Angers, Lieutenant of Trinidad and Bernard Calmette, chaplain of San Antonio.

French missionaries also contributed to the spread of Christianity in the Philippines. The first diocesan seminary in the Philippines, the seminary of St. Clement in Manila, was set up with the aid of French Monsignor Charles-Thomas Maillard de Tournon in 1704. French traders, technicians, soldiers, and officers and crews under the Manila galleon trade also came to the Philippines. The French recognized the potentials of the Philippines in the trading sector by the 17th century. France discovered the potential use of abaca in the manufacture of naval supplies, particularly ropes. Despite the Spanish colonial government's restrictions of against foreign trade, French and other foreign traders were already in Manila before it was formally opened for foreign trade. Paris fashion became the standard in Manila. Foreign traders imported French products such as stockings, muslin and linen cloth, umbrellas, gloves and coats in the Philippines while the Filipinos exported most of its indigo to France.

During the war between the United States of America and the Empire of Great Britain called the War of 1812, of which, France supported the Americans; the French pirate Jean Lafitte allied with Filipinos who had escaped slavery from the Manila Galleons and were living in New Orleans. They joined the war against the British Empire. The Filipinos played a decisive role in securing the American victory in the Battle of New Orleans, firing barrage after barrage of well-aimed artillery fire.

In 1859, during the French conquest of Indochina, the French requested the assistance of Spain, which promptly sent soldiers of Spanish, Mexican, and Filipino origin living in the Philippines, to assist France in conquering the Vietnamese city of Saigon.

France became the first country to establish a consul in Spanish Philippines, followed by Belgium, the United States and Great Britain in November 1844. France established its consul in Manila in March 1824.

Upon the opening of the Suez Canal, relations between the Philippines and European countries, including France, became more significant. Some rich and intellectual Filipinos came to France, which includes Jose Rizal, Felix Hidalgo and Juan Luna. French congregations founded colleges in the Philippines, among these colleges were the Assumption College, Saint Paul College, Notre Dame, and De La Salle University. French liberalism also found its way to the Philippines which influenced the Filipino colonial government opposition, the reformists and the revolutionaries. The ideals of the French Revolution inspired the Philippine Revolution as the Constitution of the First Philippine Republic was based on the Second Constitution of France's First Republic.

During the centennial of the French Revolution in 1889, José Rizal sought to organize a conference called the International Association of Filipinologists which was to be launched with Ferdinand Blumentritt, the President, and Edmond Plauchut, the Vice President. The French also permitted Rizal to live in exile in France where he wrote the books Noli Me Tangere and El Filibusterismo.

The revolutionaries of the Philippines sought support from France. In January 1897, the Philippine Commission in Hong Kong sent a petition to M. Henry Hannoteaux, Minister of Foreign Affairs, enumerating 50 points concerning the Philippine grievance against Spain and calling for France's assistance. In 1898, Emilio Aguinaldo also sent his delegate to Paris for the negotiation of an agreement, which concerned the fate of the Philippines in the aftermath of the Spanish–American War. Lastly, Filipino residents in Paris, urged by the Philippine government in exile in Hong Kong, made a commission calling for the recognition of the Republic. The commission was led by Pedro Roxas and Juan Luna.

However the Filipino revolutionaries failed to garner French support. France remained neutral and distanced itself from the Filipino revolutionaries as France respected Spain's sovereignty over the Philippines as a fellow colonial power. Ironically, the decision to destroy the First Philippine Republic was solidified in France with 1898 Treaty of Paris which preluded the Philippine-American War.

Before these poetic historical opposites occurred, a previous serendipity also occurred, as when the originally French family of the Bourbon Dynasty which ruled both France and the Spanish Empire and thus the Philippines were subjected to the crucible of Revolution and Regicide, as During the French Revolution, the Diocese of Luçon which is also called the region Vendée, mustered a failed Catholic and Royalist Counter-Revolution to restore the Bourbon Dynasty to power in France. In contrast, the island of Luzon in the Philippines which is pronounced the same in French as the "Luçon", in the Diocese of Luçon of France, that is, Luzon (Luçon) Island, Philippines; the island produced Military Officers and a Prime-Minister of Spain, Marcelo Azcárraga, who warred against the Spanish Revolution of 1854 and enacted the restoration to the throne of the Spanish Bourbons who were otherwise unseated in France.

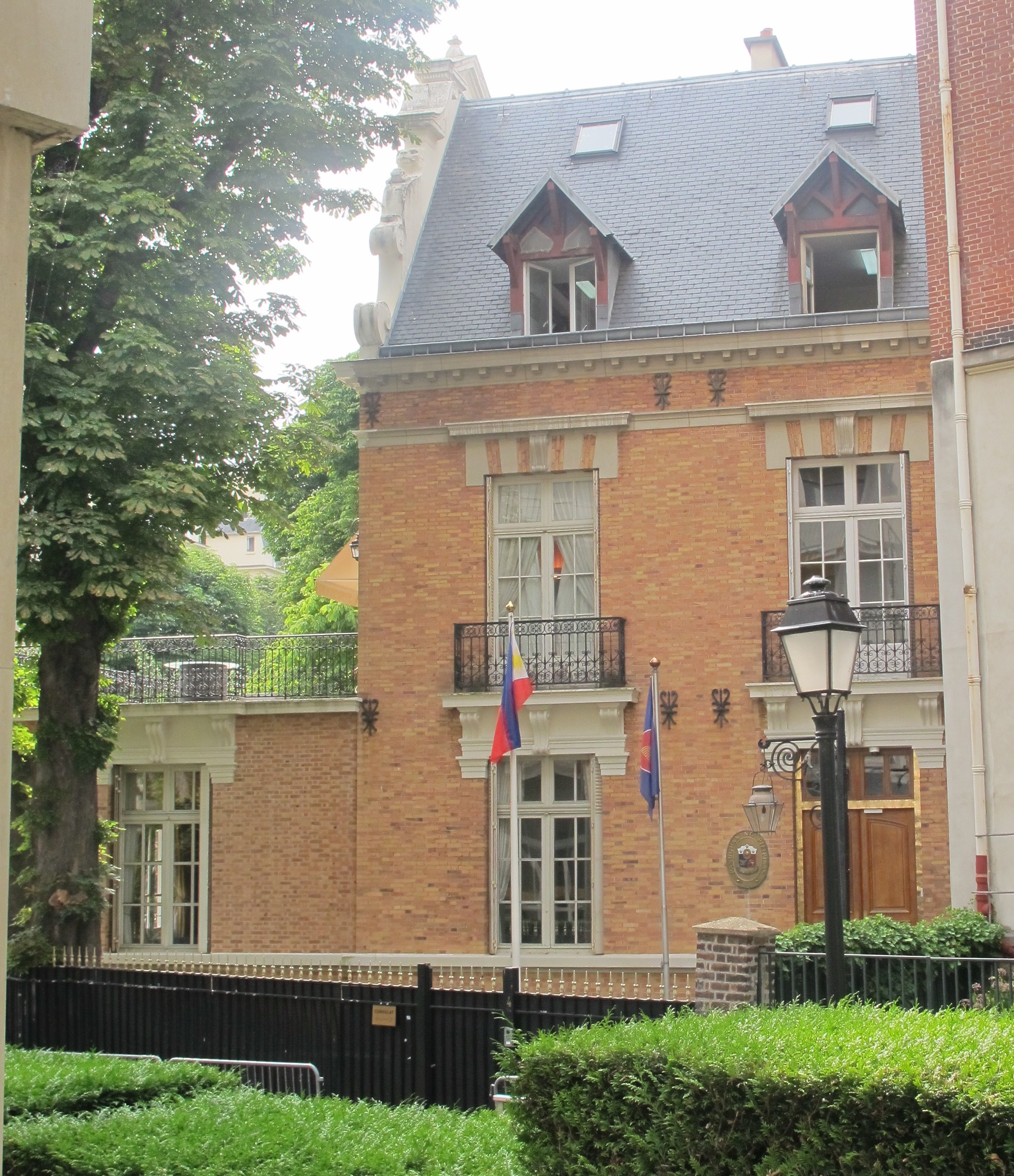
Embassy of the Philippines in Paris

Diplomatic relations between France and the Philippines was officially established on June 26, 1947, with the signing of the Treaty of Amity by French Foreign Minister Georges Bidault and Philippine Vice President and Foreign Secretary Elpidio Quirino.

In 1986, France became the first nation globally to formally acknowledge President Corazon Aquino's government after the People Power Revolution.

In 2008, the French Legion of Honour Association, led by French Ambassador Gérard Chesnel and former Philippine House Speaker Jose de Venecia Jr., announced plans to restore the Philippines' first mosque, the Sheikh Karimul Makhdum Mosque in Tawi-Tawi. They collaborated with the National Historical Institute, local leaders, and civil society to refurbish the mosque and the tomb of Sheikh Karimul Makhdum, with plans to complete the project by mid-2009.

== Economic relations ==
France is the Philippines' fourth largest trading partner in the European Union after Germany, the Netherlands and the United Kingdom. Trade reached US$2.39 billion as of October 2014. This represented an increase of 24% from the same period in 2013.

France–Philippines trade relations have experienced notable fluctuations, particularly in recent years. In 2022, total bilateral trade reached $1.8 billion, a 23% increase from $1.5 billion in 2021. In 2022, the Philippine' exports to France rose by nearly 50%, from $514 million to $945 million, driven by integrated circuits, electric heaters, desiccated coconuts, corrective lenses, and home appliances, but marking a decline from $1.38 billion in 2017. Conversely, France's exports to the Philippines grew by 9% to $1.01 billion in 2022, led by planes, helicopters, packaged medicaments, and pork. However, trade activity in September 2024 revealed a sharp decline in both exports and imports compared to the same period in 2023. Philippine exports to France dropped by 61.1% to $27.9 million, led by decreases in integrated circuits, aircraft parts, and semiconductor devices, while imports fell by 18.3% to $68.2 million, driven by reductions in planes, helicopters, vaccines, and centrifuges.

The September 2024 trade balance reflected a $40.4 million deficit for the Philippines, with top exports including optical fibers, industrial printers, and aircraft parts, and key imports such as packaged medicaments, animal meal, and trunks and cases. This decline highlights shifting dynamics in bilateral trade, with France maintaining a growing trade surplus over the years due to its strong exports of transportation equipment, chemicals, and animal products. While France's services exports to the Philippines in 2020 amounted to $276 million, the Philippines did not record any services exports to France in 2022, further emphasizing the imbalance in trade relations.

In 2020, the trade volume between France and the Philippines reached $1.03 billion, with Philippine exports accounting for $472.33 million. That same year, it was reported that Filipinos living in France sent a total of $47.53 million in remittances.

On the investment front, France ranked as a leading EU investor in the Philippines from 2017 to 2022, contributing $130 million across manufacturing, energy, trade, and communication sectors.

On 7 June 2024, Philippine Finance Secretary Ralph Recto and French Ambassador to the Philippines Marie Fontanel signed the Agreement on Financial and Development Cooperation for the Philippines to facilitate concessional official development assistance and blended financing from France. The agreement aimed to support the Philippines' key projects in sectors such as agriculture, infrastructure, renewable energy, and water sanitation to promote poverty reduction and inclusive growth. It also highlighted France's interest in strengthening collaboration with the Philippines in areas like defense, security, maritime, and climate change. This initiative aligned with the Bongbong Marcos administration's infrastructure program, which prioritizes transformative projects across transportation, energy, and social infrastructure.

=== Transportation and connectivity ===
In September 2024, French shipping company CNC, a subsidiary of CMA CGM, became the first fully foreign-owned firm to offer domestic shipping services in the Philippines, launching its Luzon Visayas Mindanao Express (LVMX) route. The weekly service connects Manila, Cebu, and Cagayan de Oro, aiming to lower transport costs and improve the efficiency of goods distribution within the archipelago. This development followed amendments to the Public Service Act, which lifted foreign ownership restrictions in the shipping industry, allowing CNC to expand its Philippine operations. The initiative highlighted the growing demand for domestic and international logistics in the country.

In December 2024, after 20 years, France's flag carrier, Air France, relaunched regular non-stop flights from Paris' Charles de Gaulle Airport to Manila's Ninoy Aquino International Airport (and back), offering three weekly flights to enhance trade and tourism between France and the Philippines. The French Embassy prepared for an anticipated increase in visa applications, with Ambassador Fontanel expressing strong support for the initiative as a long-standing goal for both countries. To strengthen aviation ties further, the Civil Aviation Authority of the Philippines signed a memorandum of understanding with its French counterpart to improve safety, efficiency, and capacity building in preparation for a 2025 audit.

== Military relations ==
=== 2025 ===
In February, the French aircraft carrier Charles de Gaulle and its strike group conducted combat drills with the Philippine Navy and Air Force in the South China Sea, including anti-submarine and aerial combat exercises. The Charles de Gaulle docked at Subic Bay, a former U.S. naval base, after over two months of deployment in the Indo-Pacific. French Ambassador Marie Fontanel reaffirmed France's commitment to regional security and freedom of navigation. In March 2026, the two countries signed a visiting forces agreement.

== High-level visits ==
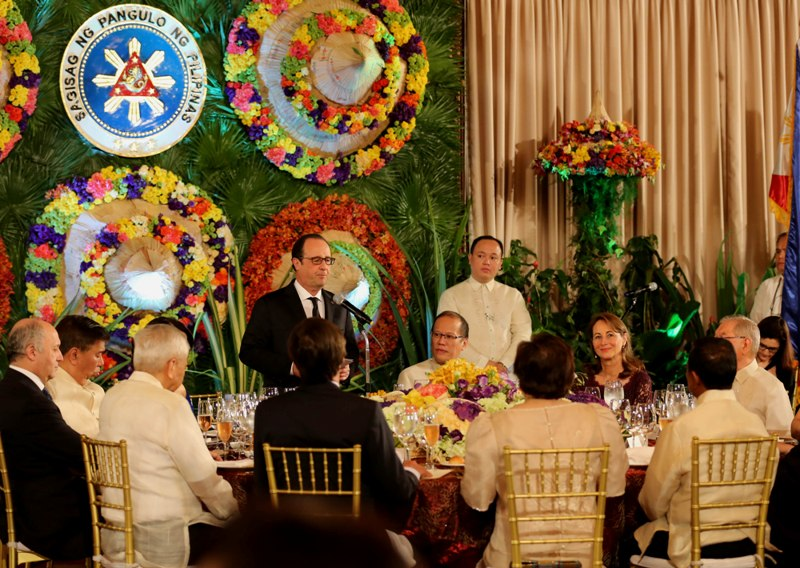
French President François Hollande delivers remarks during a state dinner hosted by Philippine President Benigno Aquino III at the Malacañang Palace in Manila, 26 February 2015

Several Philippine presidents have undertaken official visits to France. In 1937, as the Philippines approached its independence from the United States, President Manuel L. Quezon established high-level connections through an official visit to France. In 1989, President Corazon Aquino became the first (and so far, only) Philippine president to pay a state visit to France when she, along with more than 30 heads of state or government, commemorated the 200th anniversary of the French Revolution. In 1994, President Fidel V. Ramos paid an official visit to France. President Gloria Macapagal Arroyo paid an informal working visit to France in 2003 to attend a UNESCO summit in Paris. The most recent Philippine president to visit France, to date, is Benigno Aquino III in 2014.

In 2012, French Prime Minister Jean-Marc Ayrault became the first sitting French head of state or government to visit the Philippines in 65 years when he paid an official visit to the country. In 2015, French President François Hollande paid a two-day state visit to the Philippines, becoming the first French president to do so. Hollande attended a climate change forum in Manila and visited Guiuan, Eastern Samar, which was heavily devastated by Typhoon Haiyan in November 2013. There, Hollande announced a €1.5 million aid to help communities prone to typhoon devastation through the Agency for Technical Cooperation and Development.

== Filipinos in France ==
More than 200,000 Filipinos are currently residing in France. Eighty per cent of Filipinos in France have lived in the nation for less than seven years, and 95% have lived in France for less than 15 years. Paris is home to a small Filipino community.

== Resident diplomatic missions ==
- France has an embassy in Manila.
- the Philippines has an embassy in Paris.

== See also ==
- Foreign relations of France
- Foreign relations of the Philippines
