= Monika Sosnowska =

Polish installation artist

- Born: 5 May 1972 (age 53); Ryki, Poland
- Education: University of Fine Arts in Poznań; Rijksakademie van Beeldende Kunsten in Amsterdam
- Known for: installation art
- Awards: Bâloise Prize (2003); Paszport Polityki (2003)

Monika Sosnowska (born 7 May 1972 in Ryki) is a Polish installation artist. In 2003, she received the Bâloise Prize at Art Basel as well as the Polityka's Passport award given by Poland's most prestigious weekly.

== Life and career ==
Sosnowska studied at the Painting Department of the University of Fine Arts in Poznań (1993–1998), and the Rijksakademie van beeldende kunsten in Amsterdam (1999–2000). During her final years at the Poznań academy, she found that the "painting started to escape her canvas." She began to create works that played with both two-dimensional painting and three-dimensional space, finally giving up on canvas altogether and instead using space itself as a sort of three-dimensional painting.

Sosnowska treats space as a medium for her works, always designing projects to fit into a specific space. Often she modifies pre-existent architecture, transforming physical space into mental space and playing with the viewer's perceptions. She explained: "I am especially interested in the moments when architectural space begins to take on the characteristics of mental space." In 2004, she received the Ernst Schering Foundation academic scholarship. In 2012, she was nominated for the Hugo Boss Prize.

She currently lives in Warsaw.

== Key works ==
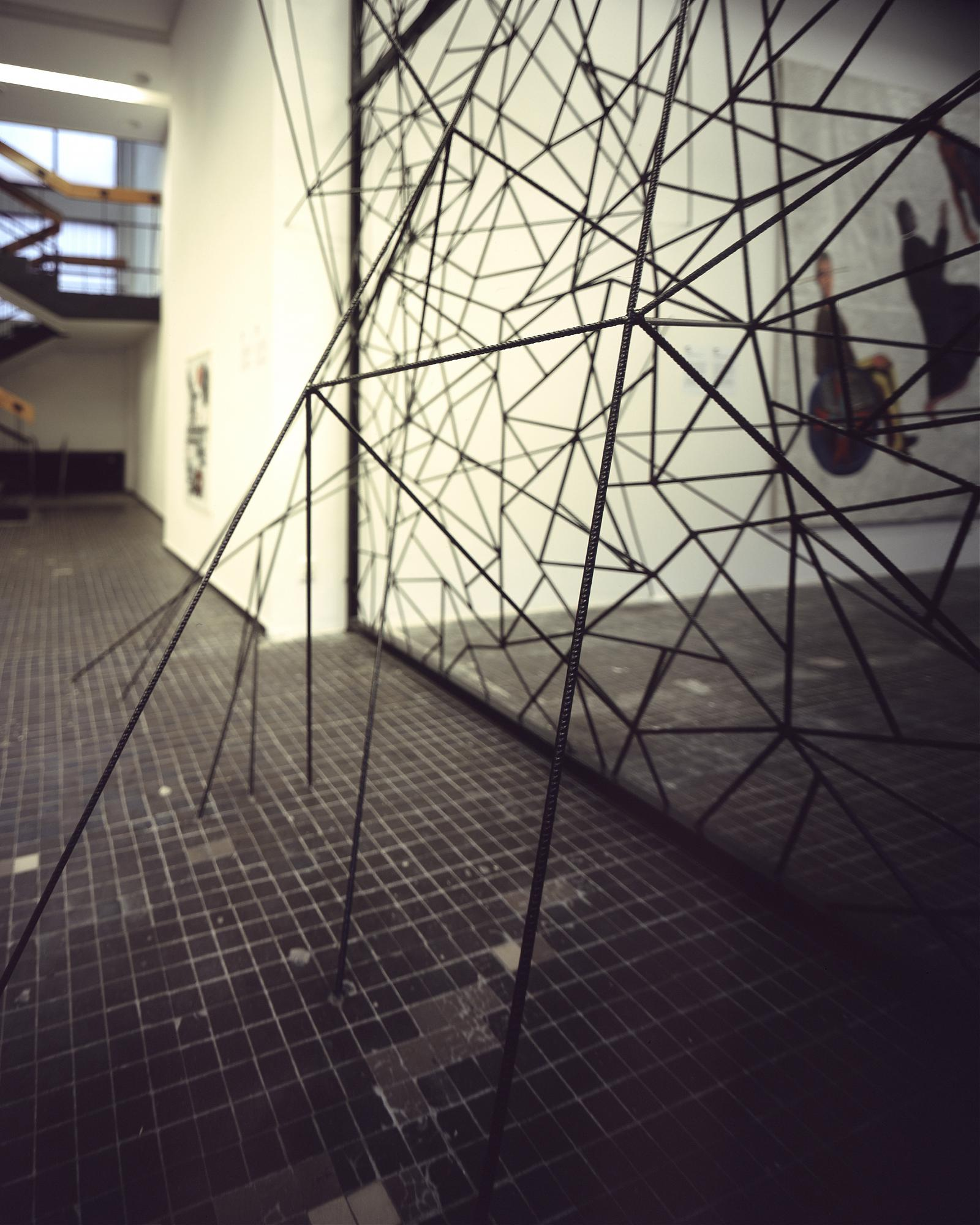
Monika Sosnowska – Krata (Grate), 2009. Installed at the entrance to the Museum of Modern Art, Warsaw

In 2003 she took part in the 50th Venice Biennale, contributing The Corridor to the Arsenale exhibition "Clandestine", curated by Francesco Bonami. Sosnowska created an architectural intervention that was also an optical illusion. Her institutional-looking corridor appeared to stretch far into the distance and it was only upon entering it that the viewer realized that the space became narrower and lower, making it impossible to reach the doors at the end and remain upright.

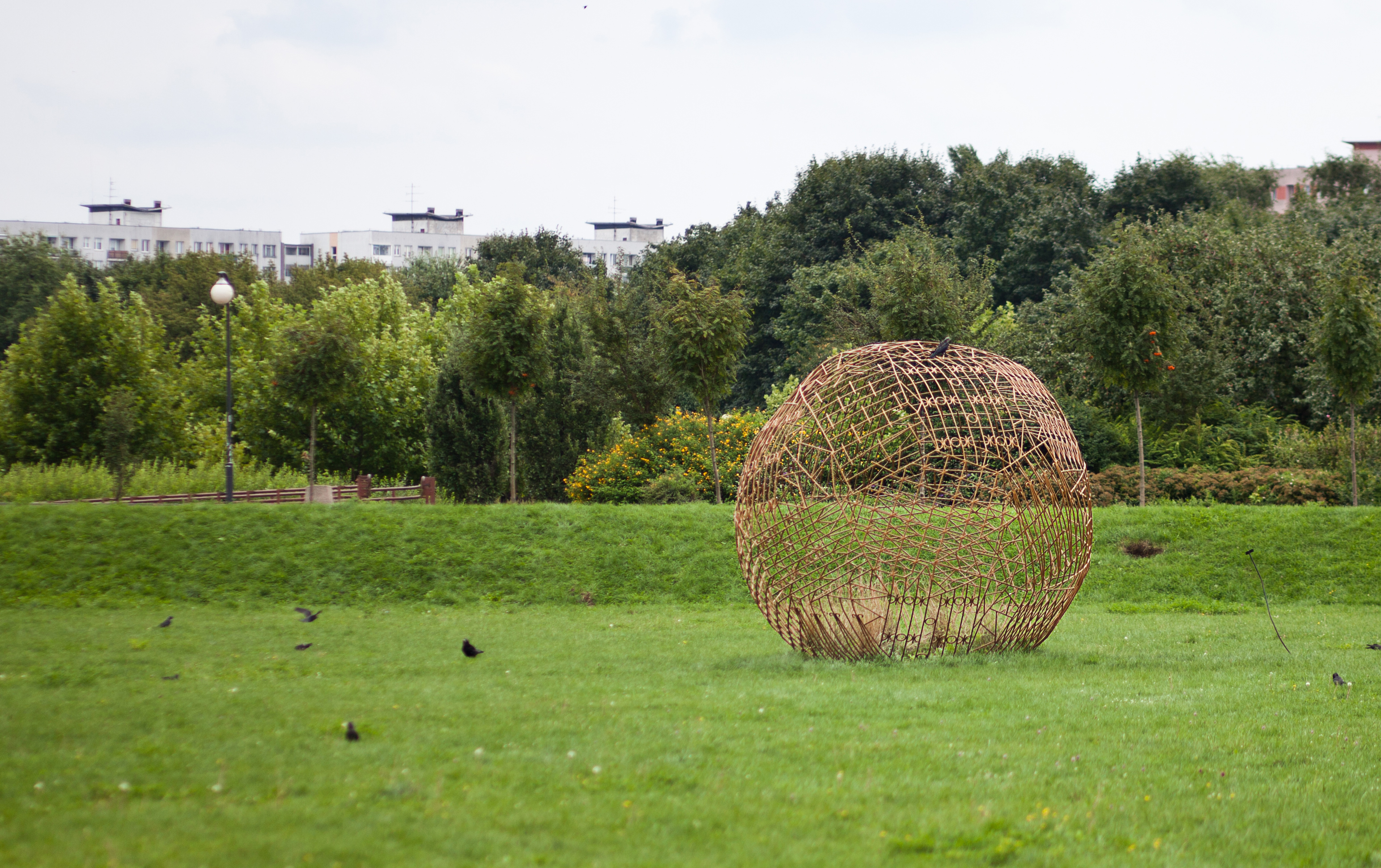
Monika Sosnowska – Krata, 2009

In 2007 Sosnowska represented Poland at the 52nd Venice Biennale. Her "1:1" crammed a bent fragment of modern architecture into the Polonia Pavilion, a 1930s building. Sosnowska wrote: "It should look as if two buildings have been constructed in the same space and have to live in symbiosis, or rather to parasite on each other. To fight, or rather to wrestle with each other. In reality my intention is to create a surreal and impossible situation."

Other major international exhibitions by Sosnowska include a solo show at New York City's Museum of Modern Art in 2006, for which she used the existing space to create a three-dimensional sculpture of geometric forms; ‘Loop’ at Kunstmuseum Liechtenstein in 2007, a Moebius strip-like architectural intervention; "Monika Sosnowska, Andrea Zittel. 1:1" at Schaulager, Basel, in 2008; and 'Untitled' for K21 Ständehaus, Kunstsammlung Nordrhein-Westfalen, Düsseldorf, a de Chirico-esque response to the extraordinary architecture and history of the museum, on display until 15 April 2012.

== See also ==
- Art of Poland
- List of Poles
- Magdalena Abakanowicz
