= Claire Hooper (artist) =

British artist

Claire Hooper (born 1978 in London) is a British artist based in London, England.

== Exhibitions ==
Hooper has shown in Europe and elsewhere, including shows at Lothringer 13, Munich; MUMOK, Vienna; Sketch, London; IT Park Taipei; Kunstwerke, Berlin, and various Serpentine gallery events. Hooper is known for her work with video, including Nyx (2010), Aoide (2011) and Eris (2012), Hooper has also made large scale watercolour paintings including Clay as Bread and Dust as Wine (2016), a 1:1 scale ‘copy’ of an imagined archaeological site in ancient Mesopotamia. She is represented by Hollybush Gardens London and her work is distributed by LUX.

== Awards ==
Hooper was the 2010 winner of the Baloise Art Prize Art Statements, Art Basel.
