= Xinyi Cheng =

Chinese figurative painter

- 程心怡
- Born: 1989 (age 35–36); Wuhan, China
- Education: Tsinghua University (BA); Maryland Institute College of Art (MFA)
- Style: Figurativism
- Awards: Baloise Art Prize

Xinyi Cheng (Chinese: 程心怡; born 1989) is a Chinese figurative painter based in Paris, France. Her works primarily consist of portraits of people in everyday situations, based on interactions and memories she has with friends and acquaintances in her social circle.

== Education and career ==
Cheng was born in Wuhan, China. She received a Bachelor of Arts in sculpture at Tsinghua University in 2012 before completing a multidisciplinary Master of Fine Arts at the Maryland Institute College of Art in 2014. Cheng moved to the Netherlands in 2016 for a two-year residency program at Rijksakademie van beeldende kunsten, where she produced a series of paintings inspired by her friendships with gay Dutch men. Following her residency, she relocated to Paris, where she has continued to paint figurative and sometimes surreal works based on her encounters with friends and strangers, with a focus on human desire and intimacy.

== Exhibition and recognition ==
Cheng received the Baloise Art Prize in 2019. Her work was exhibited at the 2018 Art Basel in Hong Kong and the 13th Shanghai Biennale. Other solo and group exhibitions include shows at the Hamburger Bahnhof in Berlin, the Renaissance Society in Chicago, the Bourse de Commerce and Palais de Tokyo in Paris, and Frans Hals Museum in the Netherlands. Her work is included in the collections of the German Nationalgalerie and the Pinault Collection, and she has been a featured speaker in a lecture series at the Courtauld Institute of Art, London.
