= List of ambassadors of the Philippines to Switzerland =

Ambassador of the Republic of the Philippines to the Swiss Confederation
- Sugo ng Republika ng Pilipinas sa Konpederasyong Suwiso; Ambassadeur de la République des Philippines auprès de la Confédération suisse Botschafter der Republik der Philippinen in der Schweizerische Eidgenossenschaft; Ambasciatore della Repubblica delle Filippine presso la Confederazione Svizzera
- Seal of the Department of Foreign Affairs of the Philippines
- Incumbent; Bernard F. Dy since 27 June 2023
- Department of Foreign Affairs; Embassy of the Philippines, Bern
- Style: His Excellency
- Reports to: Department of Foreign Affairs
- Seat: Bern, Switzerland
- Nominator: Secretary of Foreign Affairs
- Appointer: President of the Philippines; with the advice and consent of the Commission on Appointments
- Term length: No fixed term
- Inaugural holder: Tomas G. De Castro
- Formation: 21 June 1957
- Website: Philippine Embassy, Bern

The ambassador of the Republic of the Philippines to the Swiss Confederation (Filipino: Sugo ng Republika ng Pilipinas sa Konpederasyong Suwiso; French: Ambassadeur de la République des Philippines auprès de la Confédération Suisse; German: Botschafter der Republik der Philippinen in der Schweizerische Eidgenossenschaft; Italian: Ambasciatore della Repubblica delle Filippine presso la Confederazione Svizzera) is the Republic of the Philippines' foremost diplomatic representative in Switzerland. As head of the Philippines' diplomatic mission there, the ambassador is the official representative of the president and the government of the Philippines to the president and government of Switzerland. The position has the rank and status of an ambassador extraordinary and plenipotentiary and is based at the embassy located in Bern.

This diplomatic post also serves as a non-resident ambassador to the Principality of Liechtenstein.

== List of representatives ==
=== Ambassadors ===
Head of mission	Tenure	Remark(s)
Tomas G. De Castro	1959–1964	
Modesto Farolan	1966–1968	
Bartolome Umayam	1969–1972	
Hortencio C. Brilliantes	1973–1977	
Rolando A. Garcia	1978–1981	
Armando D. Manalo	1985–1986	
Luis V. Ascalon	1987–1992	
Tomas T. Syquia	1993–2000	
Rora Navarro-Tolentino	2000–2006	
Minerva Jean A. Falcon	2007–2008	
Maria Theresa P. Lazaro	2008–2011	
Leslie J. Baja	2011–2015	
Joselito A. Jimeno	2015–2018	
Denis Y. Lepatan	2018–2021	Credentials were presented on 10 April 2018 (Switzerland) and 20 June 2018 (Liechtenstein).
Bernard F. Dy	2023–present	Appointment confirmed by the Commission on Appointments on 15 December 2022. Credentials were presented on 27 June 2023 (Switzerland) and 4 March 2024 (Liechtenstein).
Source: Embassy of the Republic of the Philippines, Bern

=== Chargé d'affaires ===
Head of mission	Tenure(s)	Remark(s)
Tomas G. de Castro	1958–1959	
Rolando A. Garcia	1969–1972	
Domingo L. Siazon Jr.	1973	
Teresita V. Prado	1978	
Luis V. Ascalon	1982–1985 and 1986–1987	
Ma. Fe Pangilinan-Klingert	1992–1993	
Marilyn J. Alarilla	2000	
Lamberto Monsanto	2006–2007	
Margarita S. Ibayan	2011	
Josephine M. Reynante	2022–2023	
Source: Embassy of the Republic of the Philippines, Bern
