= Suki Seokyeong Kang =

South Korean multimedia artist (1977–2025)

- 강서경
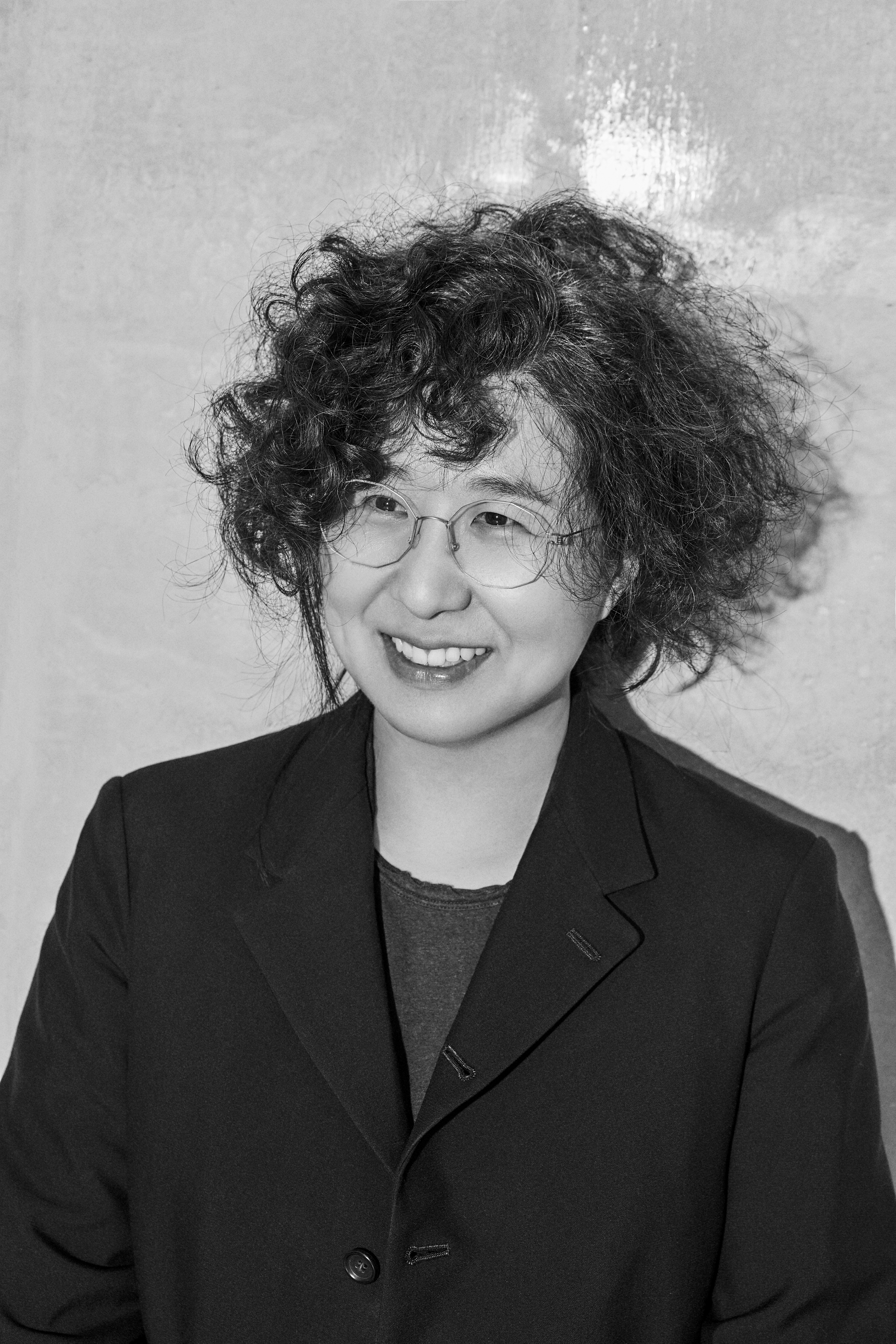
- Kang in 2019
- Born: 1977; Seoul, South Korea
- Died: April 27, 2025 (aged 47–48)
- Education: Ewha Woman's University, Seoul; Royal College of Art, London
- Known for: Installation art
- Awards: Baloise Art Prize (2018)

Suki Seokyeong Kang (강서경; 1977 – April 27, 2025) was a Korean visual artist. Kang's practice traversed painting, sculpture, performance, video, and installation. Inspired by cultural traditions of Korea as well as contemporary artistic and literary discourses. Kang decoded rules and values that govern these disciplines, turning to artistic languages of the past to construct a contextual lens through which she explored the notion of individuality and freedom in the present moment.

== Background ==
Kang was born in Seoul, South Korea in 1977. She studied Oriental painting at Ewha Woman's University and painting at the Royal College of Art, London. She was a professor of Korean painting at Ewha Woman's University.

Kang died on April 27, 2025.

== Work and themes ==
Kang's practice drew on her early training in traditional Korean painting. In her works, she espoused the philosophical disposition of Chosun-era painters, who aimed to convey their own observations and interpretations of history through poetry, writing, and visual art.

Kang's multimedia work often took the form of immersive installations. Her 2017 project Black Mat Oriole incorporates sculpture, painting, and video. The colors of the objects in the installation are based on colors from her paintings. The work also included performers who carry and arrange objects, and sit and drag their bodies on the floor.

Kang's installations all include objects that are liftable by the artist and any performers, and have sizes and weights that are at most as large as a standard human body. This technique was a catalyst to convey themes relating to the subjects of her work. For example, the shape of the sculpture Grandmother Tower was inspired by the posture of her grandmother. She also incorporated traditional hand-woven reed mats that she had commissioned.

Among the themes of Kang's work are the coming together of individuals, and how they both form community and experience their own histories. She was also inspired by classical Korean poetry and dance. Her installation work explores concepts relating to grids and their aesthetics, and how objects are arranged within a room. Her style was influenced by Jeongganbo, a form of Korean musical notation.

Kang had a studio in Seochon. She painted a gouache painting every day as part of her work.

== Exhibition history ==
Selected solo and group exhibitions by Suki Seokyeong Kang included "The Shape of Time: Korean Art after 1989" at the Philadelphia Museum of Art (2023), Art Basel (2023), the 58th Venice Biennale (2019); MUDAM Luxembourg (2019); Seoul Museum of Art (2019); Liverpool Biennial (2018); 12th Shanghai Biennale (2018); San José Museum of Art (2018); Institute of Contemporary Art, Philadelphia (2018); MAK Center for Art and Architecture, Los Angeles (2018); Gwangju Biennale (2018, 2016); Museum of Modern and Contemporary Art, Seoul (2017); Villa Vassilieff, Paris (2016); National Museum of Modern and Contemporary Art, Gwacheon (2016); Audio Visual Pavilion, Seoul (2015); Seoul Museum of Art (2014); Gallery Factory, Seoul (2013); Old House, Seoul (2013); and Bloomberg New Contemporaries, London (2012). She was the recipient of the Baloise Art Prize (2018) and Songeun Art Award (2013).

In March 2022, Kang had two solo exhibitions at the Leeum Museum of Art. Her piece "Hear We Hear" is publicly displayed in Doha.

In 2023, she had another solo exhibition at the Leeum Museum.

In 2026, she was featured in the Rituals of Perception exhibit as part of Singapore Art Week.

== Awards ==
Kang was a recipient of a 2018 Baloise Art Prize. She was also shortlisted for the SongEun Art Award in 2013–2014.

== Collections ==
The work of Suki Seokyeong Kang is included in the permanent collections of Los Angeles County Museum of Art, Los Angeles; MMCA (National Museum of Modern and Contemporary Art), Seoul; Walker Art Center, Minneapolis; Leeum Museum of Art, Seoul; Princeton University Art Museum, Princeton; MUDAM Luxembourg; Seoul Museum of Art, Seoul; Arario Museum, Seoul; Booth Collection-University of Chicago, Chicago; and National Art Bank, Korea, among others.

== Publications ==
- Suki Seokyeong Kang (2019). Suki Seokyeong Kang: Black Mat Oriole. Institute of Contemporary Art, University of Pennsylvania & Roma Publications. p. 240. ISBN 978-94-92811-54-7.
