= Duncan Campbell (artist) =

Irish video artist (born 1972)

- Born: 1972 (age 53–54); Dublin, Ireland
- Occupation: Video artist
- Children: 2
- Awards: Baloise Art Prize (2009); Turner Prize (2014)

Duncan Campbell (born 1972) is an Irish video artist, based in Glasgow. He was the winner of the 2014 Turner Prize.

== Early life and education ==
Campbell was born in Dublin, one of the five children of Paddy and Veronica Campbell, entrepreneurs who founded a catering business, Campbell Catering, later sold to Aramark. Paddy Campbell is a noted sculptor, having been, he said, inspired when in his 50s by his son, and three of Duncan's siblings are also active in the arts, as a film producer, a screenwriter and an actress.

Campbell grew up in Swords, County Dublin, and studied at the private secondary Sutton Park School. He took a BA at the University of Ulster (1996) and a Masters in Fine Arts at the Glasgow School of Art (1998), remaining resident in Glasgow afterwards.

== Career ==
In 2008, he was awarded the Baloise Art Prize. In 2013, Campbell was one of the three artists chosen to represent Scotland at the Venice Biennale.

On 1 December 2014, it was announced that he had won the 2014 Turner Prize. Campbell took the prize for his video work "It for Others" – a 50-minute video work that reflects on African art and includes a dance sequence inspired by Karl Marx.

In 2018 Duncan Campbell was supported by the A. M. Qattan Foundation's A Flourishing Field project funded by the Swedish government.

== Personal life ==
As of 2014, Campbell, at 42, was a father of two.
