= Racso Jugarap =

Filipino-Belgian Wire artist

- Born: 15 January 1989 (age 37); General Santos

Racso Jugarap

Racso Jugarap (born January 15, 1989) is a Filipino Belgian wire artist from General Santos, Philippines.

== Early life ==
Racso Jugarap, born in 1989, had a head start in art – he was the youngest son of a jewelry designer. As a result, he grew up with not only an inextricable connection with art crafting and creative design, him playing and freely experimenting with the tools in his father's workshop cultivated creative ideas in his mind. During that particular time of higher education endeavor, he had already been commissioned to do design pieces for hotels and business establishments. That experience sharpened then duly broadened his creativity, allowed him to explore a wide range of materials to craft art pieces, and showed him that there are endless and exciting possibilities for art crafting, art creating, and art designing.

== Works ==
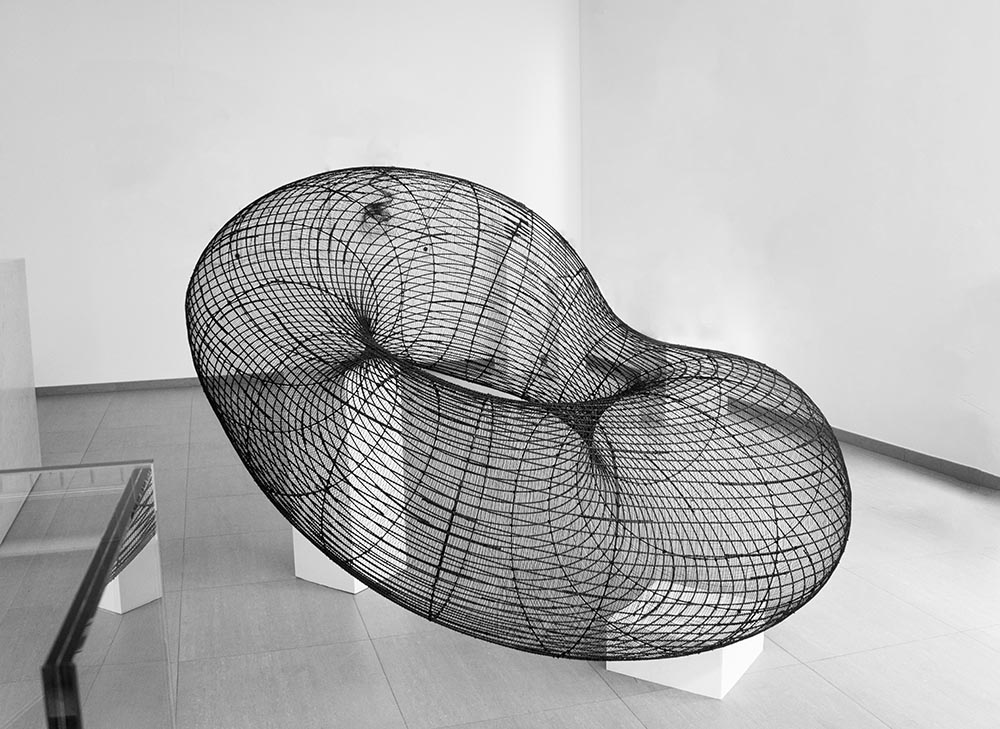
It Will Come Back To You by Racso Jugarap

Racso Jugarap is mainly self-taught with extensive experimentations with the material, the artist in Racso understood how materials behave—weaving each strand of various wires into organic and asymmetric shapes using the most minimal tool available to him. Curves have always been a crucial element in the artist's works, biomorphic and organic shapes. In 2024, Racso was selected as one of the 30 finalist for Loewe Foundation Craft Prize for his work Echinoid.

== Wearable arts and collaborations ==
The artist also shows a fascination with the fashion world as he created his series Icarus, which are different types of wearable pieces made from metal wires.Wearable art He also collaborated with brands such as Guerlain, Rémy Martin and Tomorrowland Festival in his career.

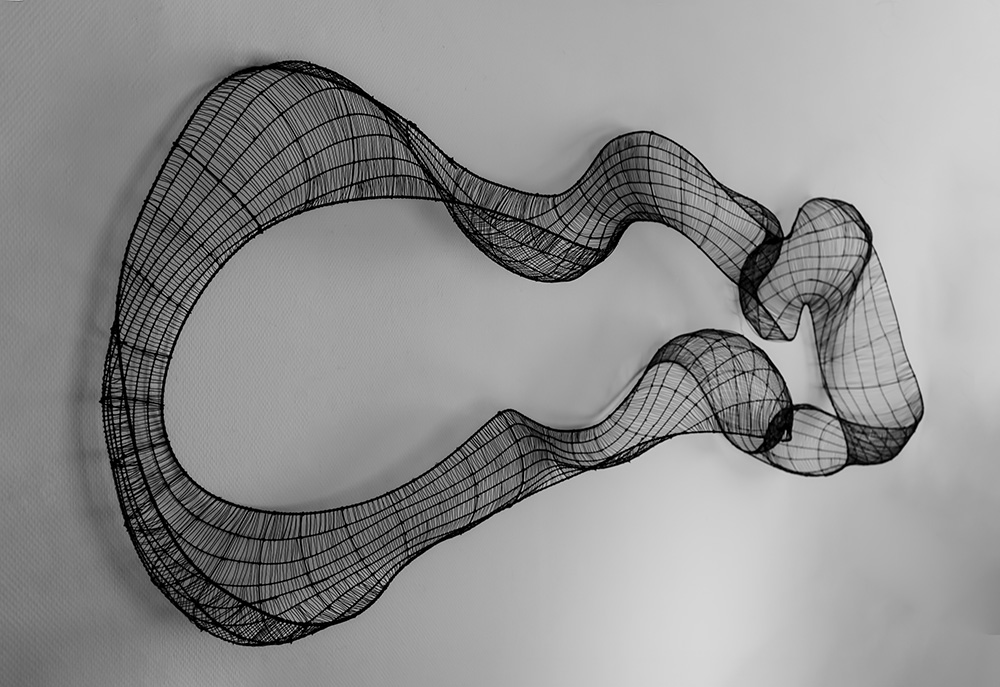
Aurora by Racso Jugarap

== Book ==
Black and White Reasons For My Carpal Tunnel Syndrome- A Photobook (2020)

== TV shows ==
Snack Masters Season 1 Episode 4 With Sofie Dumont, Patrick Aubrion Hosted by Koen Wauters.

Work seen at Extended Family, NBC channel

== Exhibitions ==
=== Solo exhibitions ===
- 2023 Puttenaers Gallery, Diest, Belgium
- 2022 European Commission (Lobby Show) Brussels, Belgium
- 2021 Frederick Mouraux Gallery, Brussels, Belgium (Duo)
- 2020 Art Forum, Antwerp, Belgium
- 2019 Noon Gallery, Evere, Belgium
- 2016 Les Expos du 130, Brussels, Belgium

=== Group exhibitions ===
- 2024 Palais De Tokyo Museum, Paris, France
- 2022 S.M.A.K. Museum, Gent Belgium. The Plinth
- 2021 Gallerie 208, Paris, France
- 2021 Expo Bonheiden, Bonheiden, Belgium
- 2021 GURU Fair, Paris, France
- 2021 Chausee des Arts, Auderghem, Belgium
- 2021 Affordable Art Fair, Hamburg, Germany
- 2021 Art Muc, Munich, Germany
- 2020 Balthasar, Brussels, Belgium
- 2017 Soirée à la Rue de l'Abattoir, Tamines, Belgium
- 2019 Chausee des Arts, Auderghem, Belgium
- 2019 Ten Gallery, Knokke, Belgium
- 2019 Akademy, Kortrijk, Belgium
- 2019 Memojacqs Gallerym, Brussels, Belgium
- 2018 Luna Rosa Gallery, Brussels, Belgium
- 2018 Modern Shapes, Antwerp, Belgium
- 2018 Art Rotterdam, Rotterdam, Netherlands
- 2017 Cocoon, Brussels, Belgium
- 2017 Palais 12 All4Home, Brussels, Belgium
- 2017 Intirio, Gent, Belgium
- 2017 Maison et Objet, Paris, France
- 2016 Les Memoire des Jacqmottes, Belgium

== Notable collector ==
The Weeknd, Abel Makkonen Tesfaye, a Canadian singer, songwriter, and actor.

Galila Berzalai Hollander, a prominent Belgian socialite with a reputable discernment and taste for the arts.

Reinout Oerlemans and Danielle Overgraag, celebrity Dutch couple.
