= Filipinos in France =

Filipinos in France Mga Pilipino sa France Philippins en France
- (Philippines) (France)

Total population
- 50,000

Regions with significant populations
- Paris, French Riviera

Languages
- Filipino, French, English, other Philippine languages

Religion
- Catholicism

Related ethnic groups
- Filipinos, Overseas Filipinos

Filipinos in France (Filipino: Mga Pilipino sa Pransiya; French: Philippins en France) consist of migrants from the Philippines and their descendants living and working in France. About 50,000 Filipinos resided in France in 2020, with a large share of the population consisting of those who arrived illegally. 80% of Filipinos in France have lived in the nation for less than seven years, and 95% have lived in France for less than 15 years. Paris is home to a small Filipino community.

== History ==
During the centennial of the French Revolution in 1889, José Rizal sought to organize a conference called the Association Internationale des Philippinistes which was to be launched with Ferdinand Blumentritt, the President and Edmond Plauchut, the Vice President. The French also permitted Rizal to live in exile in France where he wrote the books Noli Me Tangere and El Filibusterismo.

On June 26, 1947, the Philippines and France signed a Treaty of Amity which established diplomatic relations with the 2 countries.

== Filipinos today ==
Filipinos living in France work as artists, domestic servants, professionals, students, and writers, or in the health care, information technology, and electronics sectors. The French government encouraged Filipinos to work in France, as long as they eventually returned to the Philippines, by instituting new migration laws. Brice Hortefeux, French Minister for Immigration, Integration, National Identity and Development Solidarity, said, "I’ve already put in place, for particularly skilled workers, a specific procedure allowing them a three-year, once-renewable, permit to stay in France. This shows that by encouraging the movement of skilled workers, we are rejecting the brain drain ... We hope it will be useful to both countries."

10% of Filipinos living in France have married French citizens. By 2000, 5,823 French citizens had been born in the Philippines, including both French nationals and naturalized Filipinos. Only one school in France, the EFI Langue Institut Linguistique Européen in Saint-Germain-en-Laye, offers classes about the Filipino language. 16% of Filipinos in France are between 16 and 25 years of age, 50% are between 26 and 35, 29% are between 36 and 45, and 6% are older than 46.

Every year since 1980, a festival embracing Philippine culture has been held in Paris, called the Pista sa Paris. The event is sponsored by the Philippine embassy in Paris, and features singers, dancers, and Philippine cuisine.

== See also ==
- Filipinos in the French military
- France–Philippines relations
