= Martha Atienza =

Dutch-Filipino video artist

Martha Atienza (Philippines, b. 1981) is a Dutch-Filipino video artist born in Manila. Born to a Dutch mother and Filipino sea-captain father in a family of seafarers, she works with video, sound and installation to explore histories of migration, labour, identity and environmental degradation.

She was awarded the Afield Fellowship in 2024, won the Baloise Art Prize in Art Basel in 2017, was twice awarded the Ateneo Art Awards in Manila in 2012 and 2016, and received the Cultural Center of the Philippines Thirteen Artist Award in 2015. She has participated in international biennales and triennials including the 2nd Diriyah Contemporary Art Biennale, Riyadh (2024), 17th Istanbul Biennial, Istanbul (2022), Bangkok Art Biennale: Escape Routes, BACC, Bangkok (2020), Honolulu Biennial: To Make Wrong / Right / Now, Oahu, Hawaii (2019); and the 9th Asia Pacific Triennial of Contemporary Art, QAGOMA, Brisbane (2018). She exhibited her work at New York's Times Square's electronic billboard in July 2024.

In addition to her art practice, Atienza is the president and co-founder with her brother Jake Atienza of GoodLand, a community-centered platform on Bantayan Island which has evolved from Atienza's interest in art as a tool for social change.
