= Tess Lazaro =

Filipino diplomat (born 1959)

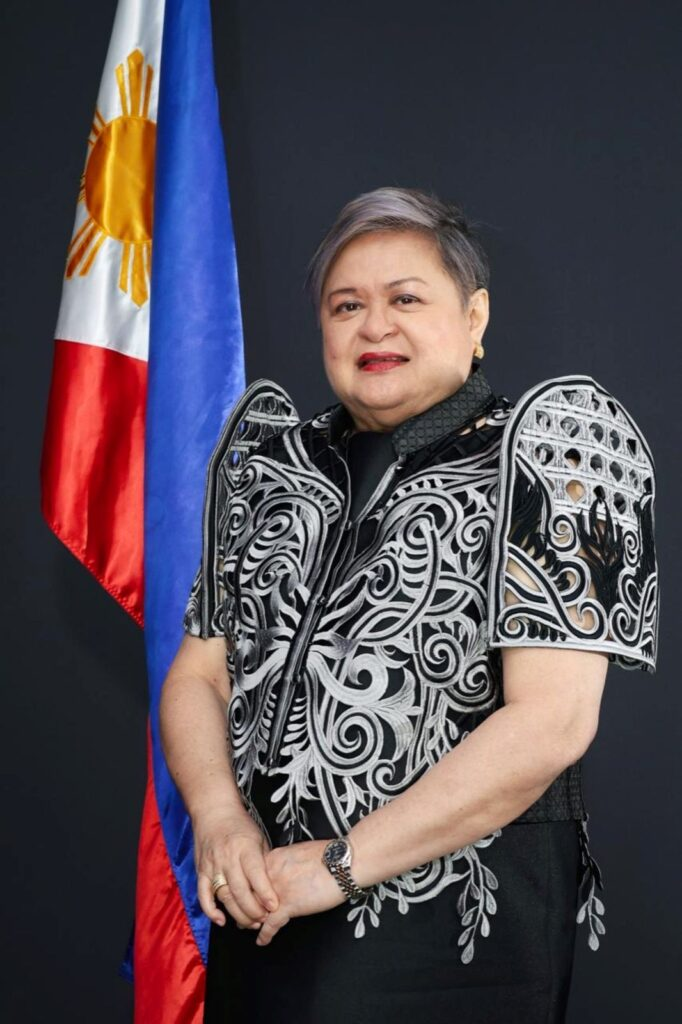
- Official portrait, 2025

29th Secretary of Foreign Affairs
- Incumbent
- Assumed office July 1, 2025
- President: Bongbong Marcos
- Preceded by: Enrique Manalo

Undersecretary for Bilateral Relations and ASEAN Affairs
- In office July 28, 2022 – June 30, 2025
- President: Bongbong Marcos
Prior ambassadorships
Ambassador of the Philippines to France and Monaco
In office April 23, 2014 – 2020
President	Benigno Aquino III; Rodrigo Duterte
Preceded by	Cristina Ortega
Succeeded by	Junever Mahilum-West
Ambassador of the Philippines to Switzerland
In office December 13, 2008 – March 31, 2011
President	Gloria Macapagal Arroyo; Benigno Aquino III
Preceded by	Minerva Jean Falcon
Succeeded by	Leslie Baja

Personal details
- Born: Maria Theresa Parreño Lazaro; May 8, 1959 (age 67)
- Education: Miriam College (BA); University of the Philippines Diliman (LLB)
- Profession: Diplomat; lawyer
- Awards: Order of Sikatuna

Maria Theresa "Tess" Parreño Lazaro OS (born May 8, 1959) is a Filipino diplomat and lawyer who has served as the 29th secretary of foreign affairs since 2025. She previously served as the undersecretary for bilateral relations and ASEAN affairs from 2022 to 2025 and held various diplomatic posts under multiple Philippine administrations.

A graduate of Maryknoll College (now Miriam College), Lazaro pursued legal studies at the University of the Philippines Diliman. She joined the Department of Foreign Affairs in 1984 and has since served in several administrative and diplomatic roles. She served as the Philippine ambassador to Switzerland from 2008 to 2011 and as ambassador to France and Monaco from 2014 to 2020.

In 2022, Lazaro was appointed as undersecretary for bilateral relations and ASEAN affairs. During her tenure, she was involved with discussions concerning the possible acceptance of Afghan refugees into the country and served as a top negotiator in maritime disputes in the South China Sea. In 2025, she was appointed foreign affairs secretary as part of a cabinet reshuffle, and by 2026 was appointed ASEAN Special Envoy to Myanmar amidst ASEAN's efforts to address the ongoing Myanmar civil war that has caused instability and a humanitarian crisis.

== Life and career ==
Lazaro obtained her Bachelor of Arts in International Studies from Maryknoll College (now Miriam College) and completed her Bachelor of Laws at the University of the Philippines Diliman in 1983. Lazaro entered the home office of the Department of Foreign Affairs (then a ministry under the fourth republic) in October 1984 as an assistant director for the law division, office of inspection, intelligence, and legal services, a position she would hold until May 1985. She would continue to hold administrative roles until July 1988, when she became the second secretary and consul at the Philippine Embassy in Bangkok, Thailand, from July 1988 to December 1993. During her tenure as second secretary, she also held the role of Deputy Permanent Representative to the United Nations Economic and Social Commission for Asia and the Pacific (ESCAP) and the Coordinating Committee for Geoscience Programmes in East and Southeast Asia (CCOP).

She went on to serve European assignments, including serving as First Secretary and Consul at the Philippine Mission to the United Nations in Geneva, Switzerland, from 1996 to 1998, followed by her appointment as Minister and Consul General at the Philippine Embassy in Madrid, Spain, from 1998 to 1999.

Lazaro's experience in the Americas began with her role as Deputy Consul General at the Philippine Consulate General in New York City, United States, from 1999 to 2002. She then moved to Australia, serving as Consul General at the Philippine Consulate General in Sydney from 2005 to 2008. Her ambassadorial appointments included her tenure as Ambassador Extraordinary and Plenipotentiary to Switzerland from December 13, 2008, to March 31, 2011, and subsequently as ambassador extraordinary and plenipotentiary to France and Monaco, while simultaneously serving as Permanent Delegate to UNESCO, a position she had held from April 23, 2014.

== Undersecretary for Bilateral Relations and ASEAN Affairs (2022–2025) ==
On July 28, 2022, Secretary Enrique Manalo appointed Lazaro as acting undersecretary for bilateral relations and ASEAN affairs. In this capacity, she became the Philippines' representative to ASEAN senior official meetings and led negotiations for communiques within the regional bloc.

Lazaro was involved in discussions regarding the Philippines' potential acceptance of Afghan refugees. She indicated that the initial US proposal involved flying Afghan refugees directly from Kabul to the Philippines, though she noted this presented logistical concerns due to the country's visa policy.

=== South China Sea negotiations ===
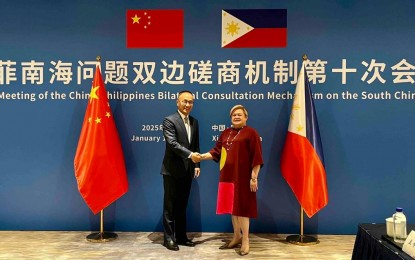
Lazaro (right) with China's vice foreign minister Chen Xiaodong (left) in Xiamen, January 2025

As undersecretary, Lazaro served as the Philippines' top negotiator with China, particularly regarding disputes in the South China Sea. She has described her diplomacy as being "frank and constructive", an attribute praised by her fellow diplomats, including Chinese ambassador to the Philippines Huang Xilian.

During her tenure, she successfully negotiated a landmark provisional arrangement with China for the Philippine delivery of supplies to Filipino forces at Ayungin Shoal, aimed at preventing future confrontations. In 2024, she led the negotiations for the Code of Conduct in the West Philippine Sea, an agreement aimed at preventing major conflicts in the disputed waters. Lazaro hoped to have pragmatic dialogue with China while raising Philippine concerns over Chinese vessels in Philippine waters. However, Chinese vice foreign minister Chen Xiaodong, whom Lazaro met on negotiations, warned her that the Philippines should act cautiously since both Philippine and China relations were at a crossroads.

== Secretary of Foreign Affairs (since 2025) ==
=== Appointment and confirmation ===
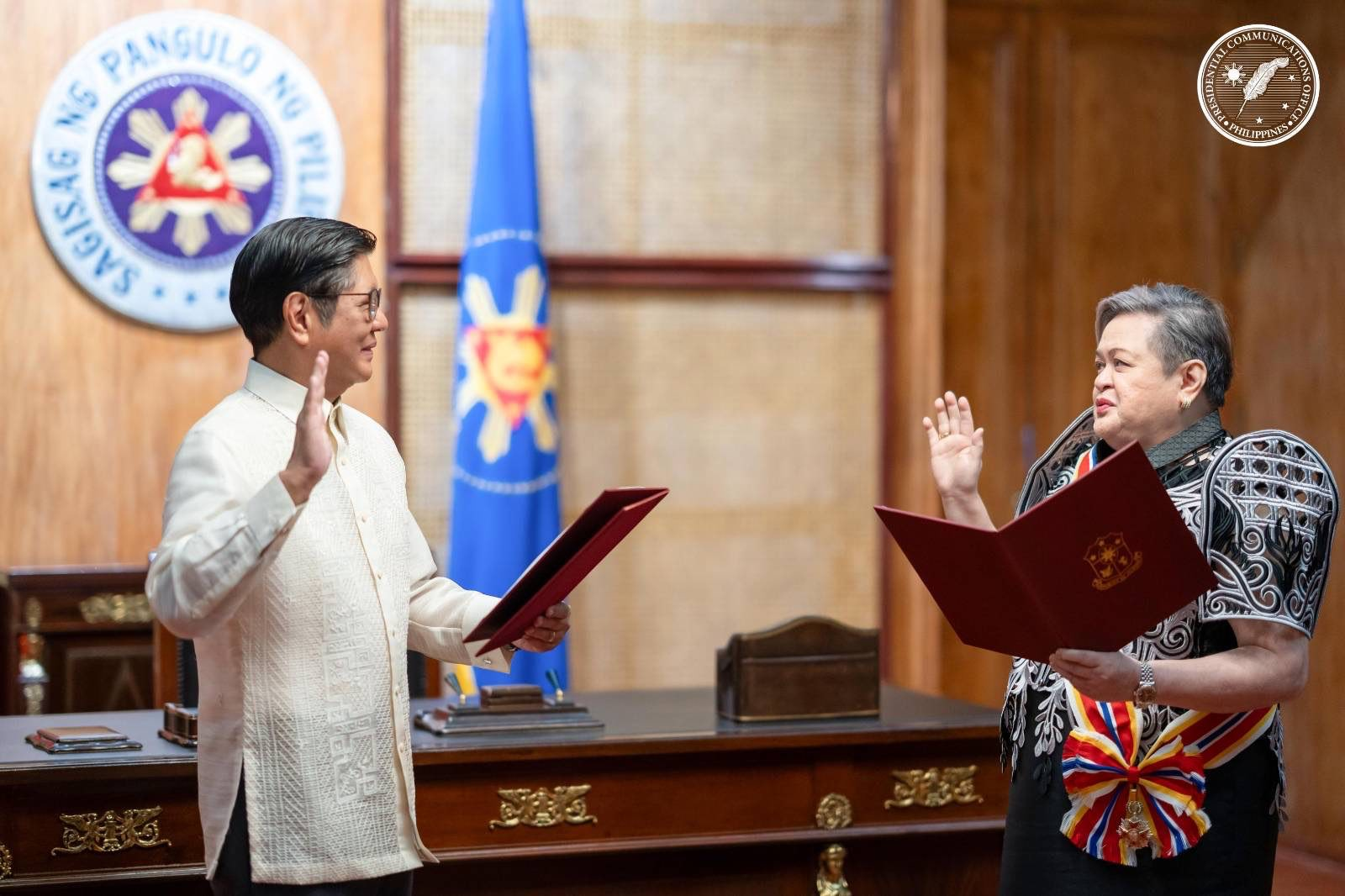
Lazaro being sworn in as foreign affairs secretary by President Bongbong Marcos at Malacañang Palace, Manila, July 1, 2025

President Bongbong Marcos appointed Lazaro as secretary of foreign affairs on May 23, 2025, as part of a major Cabinet reshuffle, with her formal installation scheduled for July 31. Observers regarded Lazaro's appointment as a continuation of the Manalo secretariat, owing to her extensive experience in the department and her role during his time in office. Lazaro herself stated that she would continue the foreign policy implemented by her predecessor.

Ahead of her installation, Lazaro pledged her support for the accession of Timor-Leste to ASEAN. During the hearing the proceedings for her confirmation, she affirmed her support for upholding ASEAN centrality in the Indo-Pacific and pursuing the two-state solution for the Israeli–Palestinian conflict supported by the United Nations. The Commission on Appointments confirmed her appointment on June 11, without major debate.

President Marcos swore in Lazaro as secretary on July 1, nearly a month ahead of schedule, after Manalo's early departure from the secretariat the previous day. Upon taking office, Marcos conferred her the Order of Sikatuna with the rank of Grand Cross. Lazaro became the second woman to serve as foreign affairs secretary, following Delia Albert, who held the position from 2003 to 2004.

=== Early tenure ===
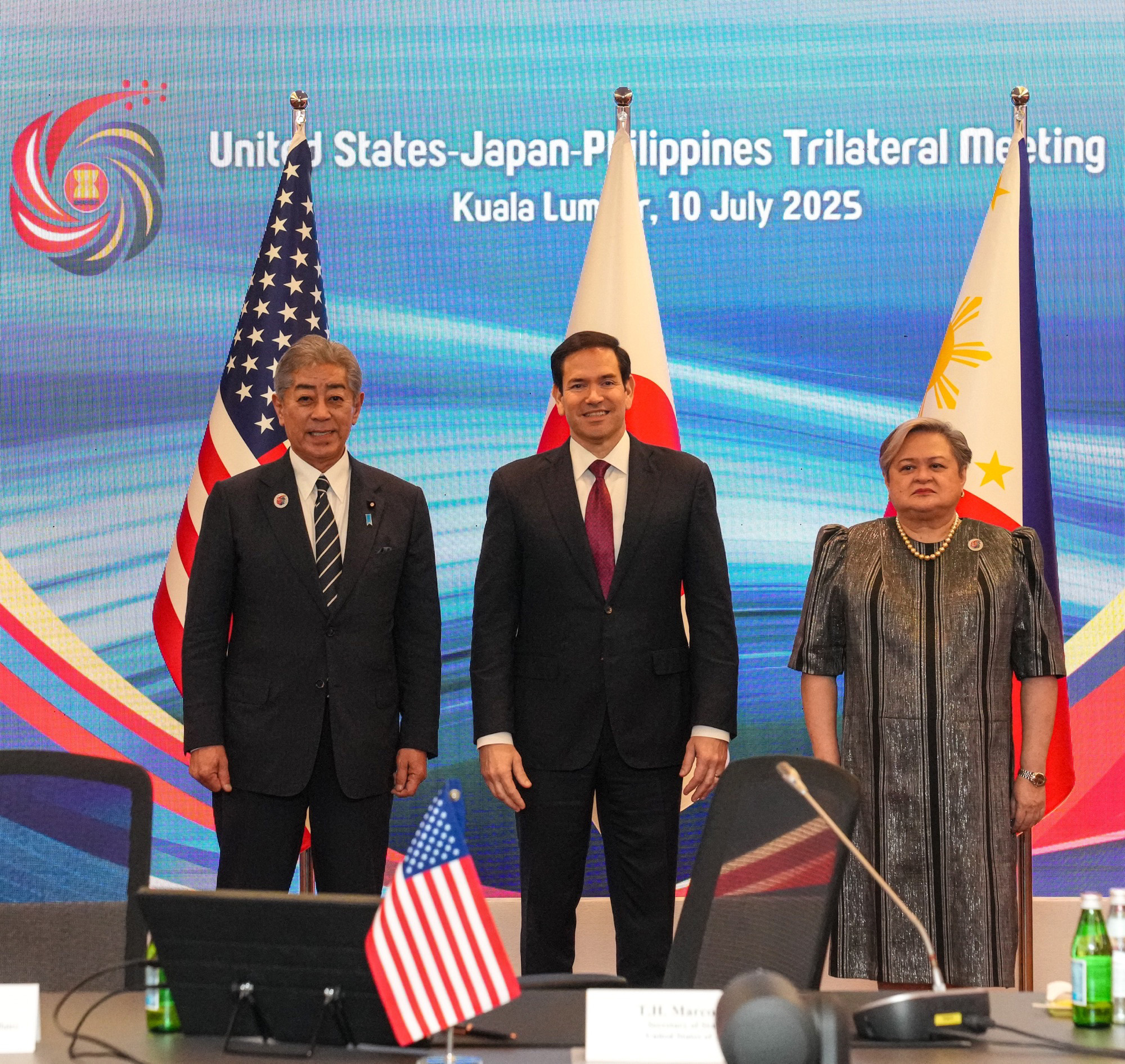
Lazaro (right) with Japanese then-foreign minister Takeshi Iwaya (left) and U.S. secretary of state Marco Rubio (center) in Kuala Lumpur, July 2025

Lazaro gave her inaugural speech as secretary on July 3, at a celebration for the 127th founding anniversary of the Department of Foreign Affairs. In her address, she emphasized the department's role in "asserting the Philippines as an independent, sovereign nation". Her tenure is expected to coincide with the Philippine chairmanship of the ASEAN in 2026. She vowed to prioritize maritime protection and other maritime concerns in the agenda of the ASEAN Summits in 2026.

In July 2025, Lazaro made her first official international trip as secretary to Kuala Lumpur, Malaysia, to attend the ASEAN Ministerial Meeting.

=== West Philippine Sea dispute ===
On the ninth anniversary of the South China Sea Arbitration award, Lazaro reaffirmed the Philippines' commitment to the award as the foundation of its maritime policy and criticized China's ongoing rejection of the ruling, describing it as a revisionist and self-serving interpretation of international law. She emphasized the Philippines' intention to uphold a rules-based international order and highlighted the award's significance in safeguarding national maritime interests and regional stability. Lazaro stated that the Philippines would continue to reject attempts to undermine the award and would pursue diplomatic engagement, capacity-building, and partnerships with other nations to strengthen maritime domain awareness and defense capabilities. She also underscored the importance of adherence to the United Nations Convention on the Law of the Sea, calling for international solidarity in promoting legal norms and resisting unlawful maritime claims.

=== One China policy ===
Amid cross-strait tensions, Lazaro has affirmed the Marcos government's commitment to defending the country's interests while maintaining its adherence to the "One China" policy. She expressed openness to initiating discussions with China regarding contingency plans for the safety and potential evacuation of approximately 200,000 Filipinos residing in Taiwan in the event of conflict. Lazaro emphasized that diplomatic mechanisms remain active, including coordination with security agencies and ongoing bilateral dialogues through established consultation frameworks. She underscored the importance of diplomacy in safeguarding national interests, complementing the Philippines' efforts to strengthen defense capabilities and regional partnerships. While upholding its non-recognition of Taiwan as a sovereign state, the Philippines has eased restrictions on official engagements with Taiwan related to trade and investment.

== Honors ==
=== National honors ===
- Philippines:
  - Order of Sikatuna Grand Cross (Datu) – July 1, 2025

Political offices
Preceded by Enrique Manalo	Secretary of Foreign Affairs; 2025–present	Incumbent
Diplomatic posts
Preceded by Minerva Jean Falcon	Philippine Ambassador to Switzerland; 2008–2011	Succeeded by Leslie Baja
Preceded by Cristina Ortega	Philippine Ambassador to France and Monaco; 2014–2020	Succeeded by Junever Mahilum-West
Order of precedence
Preceded by Alexander Gesmundo as Chief Justice of the Supreme Court of the Philippines	Order of Precedence of the Philippines as Secretary of Foreign Affairs	Succeeded by Ambassadors to the Philippines (in order of tenure)
Preceded by Alexander Gesmundo as Chief Justice of the Supreme Court of the Philippines	Order of Precedence of the Philippines as Secretary of Foreign Affairs	Succeeded by Charles John Brown as Dean of the diplomatic corps
