= Chen Xiaodong (diplomat) =

Chinese ambassador

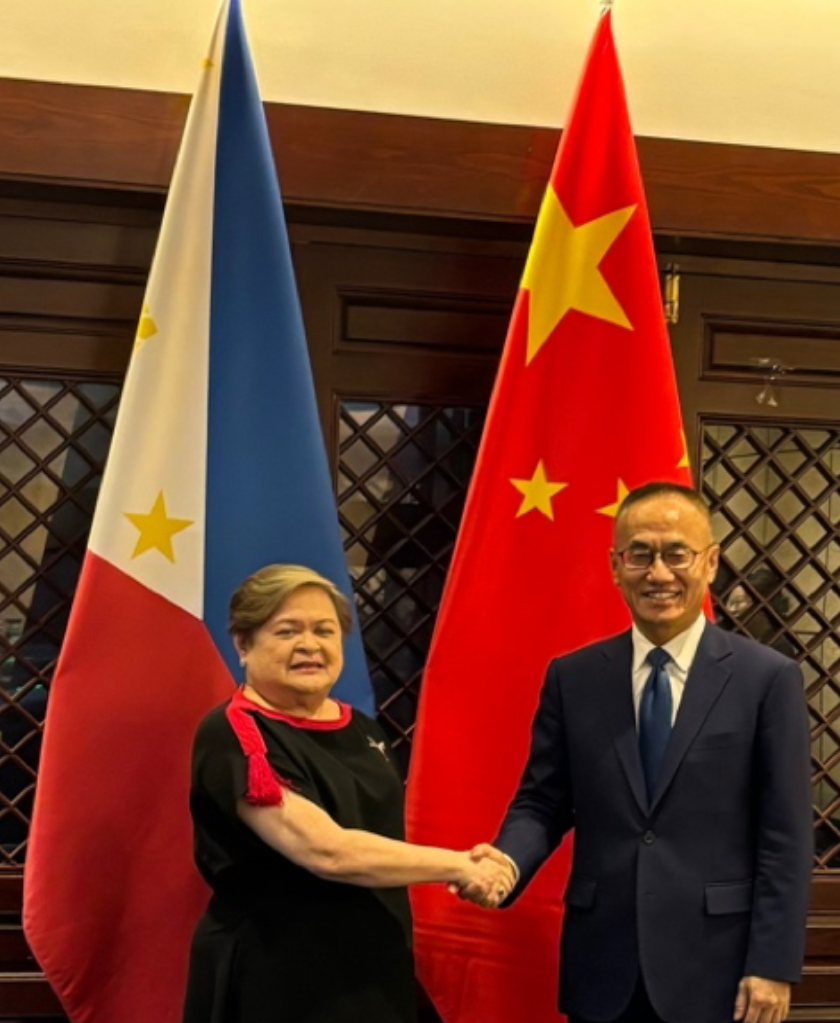
Chen (right) with Philippine Foreign Affairs Undersecretary Ma. Theresa Lazaro, September 2024

Chen Xiaodong (born December 1965) was a Chinese diplomat who became the Vice Minister of China's Foreign Ministry in March 2024. He previously served as a Chinese ambassador to Singapore and South Africa.

== Biography ==
Chen was born in December 1965 in Anhui, China. After graduating from the Beijing International Studies University with a major in Arabic, he entered foreign service for the Chinese government in 1987. In his early career, he spent different diplomatic roles in Middle East. In 2002 to 2007, he was counselor and deputy director-general of the West Asian and North African affairs department of the Chinese foreign ministry. In 2007, Chen became the Chinese ambassador to Iraq. In 2008, he then left that position and was assigned in London where he served as minister of the Chinese mission there. He then later became the Head of the West Asian and North African affairs of the Chinese foreign ministry in 2010. He was then ambasador to Singapore in 2015 until 2017 after he became assistant minister in the Chinese foreign ministry. He was then posted to Pretoria as ambassador to South Africa in 2020 at the height of the COVID-19 pandemic.

=== Vice Minister of the Foreign Ministry ===
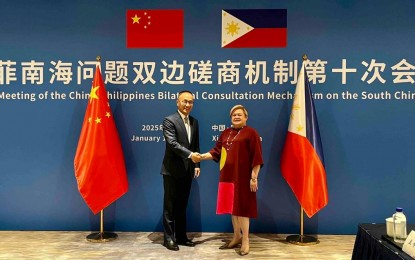
Chen (left) with Philippine Foreign Affairs Undersecretary Ma. Theresa Lazaro (right) in Xiamen, China, January 2025

In March 2024, he was promoted as foreign vice minister in China. As vice foreign minister, he opposed US intervention in the South China Sea dispute. He described the relationship of the Philippines with the United States as a pawn that "will be inevitably discarded."

In 2024, Chen and Philippine Department of Foreign Affairs (DFA) Undersecretary Ma. Theresa Lazaro had a phone call regarding the South China Sea issue. In January 2025, a bilateral meeting in Xiamen, China was held, led by Chen and Lazaro. Although the DFA agreed to deescalate tensions with China, Lazaro raised concerns over incidents involving the Chinese Coast Guard's presence in the South China Sea. Chen warned the Philippines to act cautiously as both China and Philippine relations were at a crossroads.
