= Filipinos in the Netherlands =

Filipinos in the Netherlands Filipijnen in Nederland Mga Pilipino sa Olanda
Total population
- 16,719 (2011)

Languages
- Filipino, other languages of the Philippines, Dutch, English

Religion
- Roman Catholicism

Related ethnic groups
- Filipino people, Overseas Filipino

Filipinos in the Netherlands (Dutch: Filipijnen in Nederland; Filipino: Mga Pilipino sa Olanda) comprise migrants from the Philippines to the Netherlands and their descendants living there. According to Dutch government statistics, 16,719 persons of first or second-generation Philippine background lived in the Netherlands in 2011. Though Filipinos live throughout the country, Amsterdam and Rotterdam are homes to the largest Filipino communities.

== Migration history and motivations ==
The first Filipina to marry and settle came in 1947 to work in a hospital. In the 1960s, a larger number of Filipinos arrived to work in hospitals in Leiden and Utrecht, as well as a clothing factory in Achterhoek. Since then, most Filipinos went to the Netherlands as contract workers, higher-education students, or medical workers. Partly because of the large number of Filipinos living in the Netherlands, in 2009 KLM increased the number of direct flights to Ninoy Aquino International Airport (in Manila) to seven per week, and seven per week amongst other Filipino airports.

Every day, roughly 300–500 Filipino seamen pass through Dutch ports. One-third of the au pairs in the Netherlands (1,500) are Filipinas. In addition, about 500 Filipinos work on oil rigs in the North Sea. More than 80 Filipino students attend Dutch universities pursuing Masters or Doctorate degrees.

== Community organisations ==
The first Filipino organisation in the Netherlands, Philippine Nurses Association of the Academisch Ziekenhuis in Leiden, was created in 1965. After this, other organisations such as the Dutch-Philippine Association and Dutch-Philippine Club were formed. In 1999, there were more than 20 such organisations in the Netherlands.

There are two major Philippine publications in the Netherlands, the Philippine Digest and the Munting Nayon.

== Notable individuals ==
- Antonio Zumel (1932–2001), journalist and political activist
- Luis Jalandoni (1935–2025), priest and political activist
- Jose Maria Sison (1939–2022), writer and political activist
- Fidel Agcaoili (1944–2020), political activist
- Laidback Luke (born 1976), DJ and music producer
- Paul Mulders (born 1981), football player
- Martha Atienza (born 1981), video artist
- Roxy Dorlas (born 1987), football player and coach
- Jonathan de Guzmán (born 1987), football player
- Jason de Jong (born 1990), football player
- Costello van Steenis (born 1992), mixed martial artist
- Justin Baas (born 2000), football player
- Quincy Kammeraad (born 2001), football player
- Rhino Goutier (born 2003), football player
- Jaden de Guzmán (born 2007), football player

== See also ==
- Netherlands–Philippines relations
- Filipino diaspora
- Immigration to the Netherlands
