= List of ambassadors of France to the Philippines =

Ambassador of the French Republic to the Republic of the Philippines
- Sugo ng Republika ng Pransiya sa Republika ng Pilipinas; Ambassadeur de la République française auprès de la République des Philippines
- Arms of the French Republic
- Incumbent; Donatienne Hissard since 2 October 2026
- Style: Her Excellency
- Seat: Makati, Metro Manila, Philippines
- Nominator: Minister of Europe and Foreign Affairs
- Appointer: President of France; with Council of Ministers meeting
- Term length: 3-4 years
- Inaugural holder: Gaston Willoquet
- Formation: 9 November 1946
- Website: English website of the French Embassy, Manila

The ambassador of the French Republic to the Republic of the Philippines (Filipino: Sugo ng Republika ng Pransiya sa Republika ng Pilipinas, French: Ambassadeur de la République française auprès de la République des Philippines) is France's foremost diplomatic representative in the Philippines. As head of France's diplomatic mission there, the ambassador is the official representative of the president and the government of France to the president and government of the Philippines. The position has the rank and status of an ambassador extraordinary and plenipotentiary, which was elevated in 1956, and is based at the embassy located in Makati, Metro Manila.

The French ambassador to the Philippines is also accredited as a non-resident ambassador to the countries of Federated States of Micronesia, Republic of Palau, and the Republic of the Marshall Islands.

== List of French heads of mission ==
Ambassador	Tenure	Remarks
Gaston Willoquet	9 November 1946 – 16 March 1949	Envoy
Lucien Colin	16 March 1949 – 21 July 1953	Envoy
Jean Brionval	22 July 1953 – 5 May 1956	Envoy
Jean Brionval	5 May 1956 – 23 August 1956	Elevated to the rank of "ambassador".
Georges Cattand	24 August 1956 – 14 July 1960	
François Brière	15 July 1960 – 1 April 1963	
Émile de Curton	2 April 1963 – 29 October 1964	
Ghislain Clauzel	30 October 1964 – 20 April 1967	
Olivier Lange	21 April 1967 – 24 August 1969	
Pierre Revol	25 August 1969 – 26 March 1973	
Charles de Lestrange	27 March 1973 – 28 November 1976	
Raphaël Touze	29 November 1976 – 5 August 1980	
Albert Treca	6 August 1980 – 9 February 1983	
Philippe Olivier	10 February 1983 – 12 July 1984	
Jacques Leclerc	13 July 1984 – 30 May 1987	
Jacques Le Blanc	1 June 1987 – 3 February 1991	
Olivier Gaussot	4 February 1991 – 13 November 1994	
Samuel Le Caruyer de Beauvais	14 November 1994 – 16 September 1998	
Gilles Chouraqui	17 September 1998 – 23 April 2002	
Renée Sillon-Veyret	24 April 2002 – 25 September 2005	First female ambassador.
Gérard Chesnel	26 September 2005 – 14 January 2009	
Thierry Borja de Mozota	15 January 2009 – 24 February 2012	
Gilles Garachon	25 February 2012 – 16 September 2015	
Thierry Mathou	17 September 2015 – 30 November 2017	Appointed on 20 August 2015.
Nicolas Galey	1 December 2017 – November 2020	Appointed on 26 October 2017.
Michèle Boccoz	November 2020 – 9 August 2023	Appointed on 30 October 2020.
Marie Fontanel	10 August 2023 – 10 August 2026	Appointed on 31 July 2023. Presentation of credentials on 20 September 2023.
Donatienne Hissard	2 October 2026 – present	Appointed on 10 August 2026. Presentation of credentials on 2 October 2026.
Source: Embassy of the French Republic, Manila

== See also ==
- France–Philippines relations
- List of ambassadors of the Philippines to France
