= Embassy of the Philippines, Paris =

Diplomatic mission of the Philippines in France

Embassy of the Philippines, Paris Pasuguan ng Pilipinas sa Paris Ambassade des Philippines à Paris

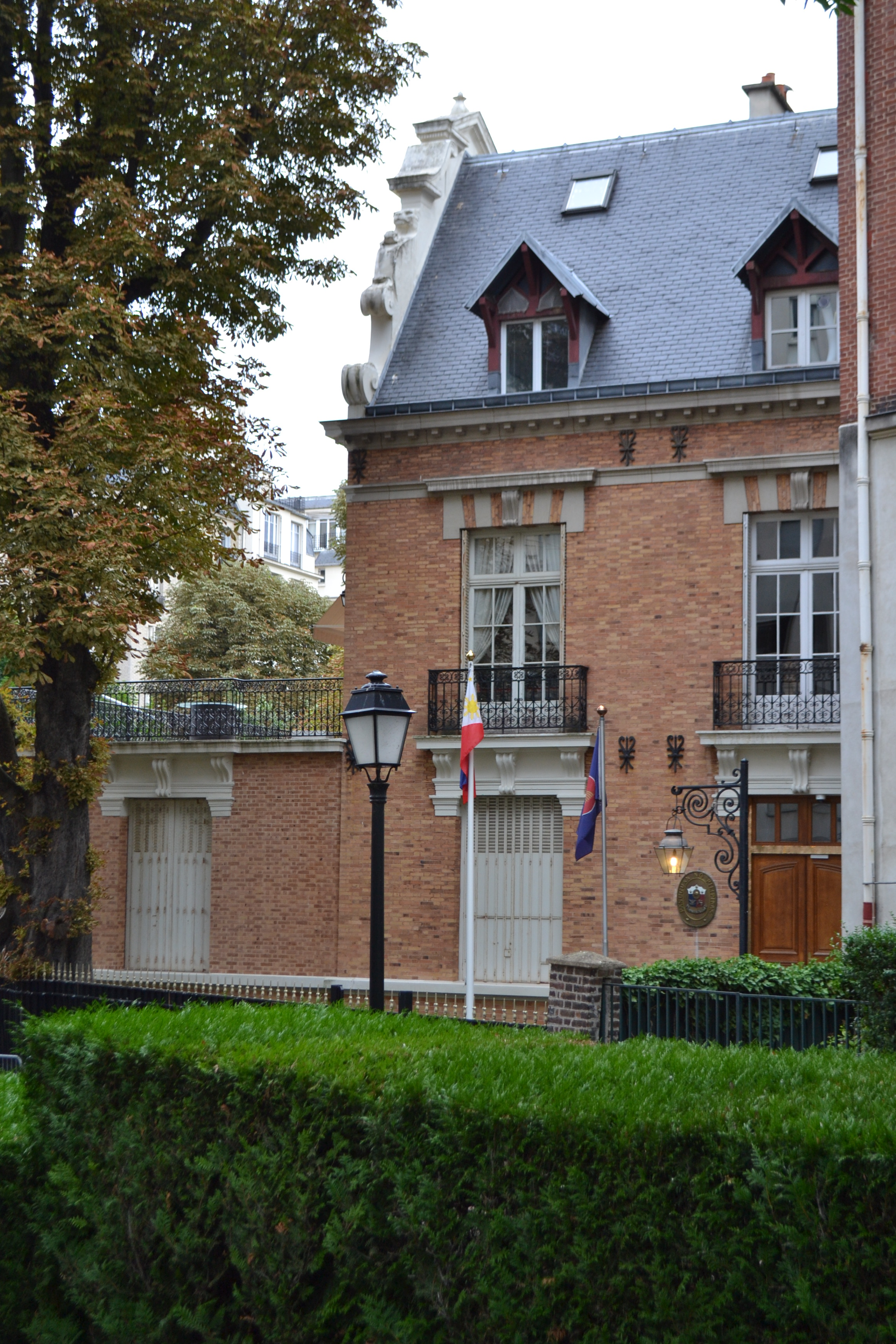
- Location: Paris
- Address: 4 Hameau de Boulainvilliers
- Coordinates: 48°51′14.5″N 2°16′30.1″E
- Ambassador: Eduardo Jose A. de Vega
- Website: parispe.dfa.gov.ph

The Embassy of the Philippines in Paris (Filipino: Pasaguan ng Pilipinas sa Paris, French: Ambassade des Philippines à Paris) is the diplomatic mission of the Republic of the Philippines to the French Republic. Opened in 1954, it is located in western Paris in the city's 16th arrondissement.

== History ==
Diplomatic relations between the Philippines and France were established on June 26, 1947, nearly a year after the Philippines obtained its independence from the United States. Plans for opening a diplomatic mission in France were discussed as early as 1949, when the cabinet of President Elpidio Quirino discussed its feasibility, although funds had already been allocated for this purpose over the previous two years. On January 5, 1951, Quirino signed Executive Order No. 351, opening a legation in Paris under the ultimate jurisdiction of the Philippine Embassy in Madrid, and headed by former Senator Proceso Sebastián.

The legation was upgraded to a full embassy in 1955, with Salvador P. Lopez, who would later become the secretary of the Department of Foreign Affairs (DFA), becoming the mission's first ambassador. Lopez would present his credentials to president René Coty on May 9, 1955, and later in his tenure the embassy's jurisdiction would expand to include UNESCO, with Lopez being named as the Philippines' first permanent representative to the agency on May 29, 1958.

== Building ==
The chancery of the Philippine Embassy in Paris is in a 19th-century pleasure house (maison d'agrément) on Hameau de Boulainvilliers, which also has an adjacent entrance on Rue de Ranelagh. Originally part of the former Château de Boulainvilliers, the chancery is beside the birthplace of tennis player Suzanne Lenglen.

The building's age means that the chancery requires regular maintenance: in 2005, Preciosa Soliven, wife of Philippine Star publisher Max Soliven, wrote in a column that the chancery's basement regularly suffered from flooding due to a lack of funds. A four-part renovation program was later effected during the ambassadorship of Cristina G. Ortega, with the DFA entering into an agreement with local construction company ABR-Vici Bâtiment on October 18, 2013, to renovate the chancery's public-facing areas. The newly renovated consular section was later inaugurated by Ortega, alongside Embassy staff and members of the local community, on January 26, 2014. A second renovation, costing the Philippine government ₱10.5 million, would be effected in 2019 under Ortega's successor, Ma. Theresa P. Lazaro, with the chancery being retrofitted to better accommodate women and persons with disabilities.

Before occupying the present-day chancery, in the 1980s the embassy was on the Place Vendôme in the 1st arrondissement, occupying the former Hôtel de Nocé. The ambassadorial residence, meanwhile, was a leased apartment on Avenue Foch selected by then-First Lady Imelda Marcos.

== Staff and activities ==
The Philippine Embassy in Paris is headed by Ambassador Eduardo Jose A. de Vega, who was appointed to the position by President Bongbong Marcos on November 14, 2024. Prior to his appointment as ambassador, de Vega, a career diplomat, served as the DFA's undersecretary for migrant workers' affairs, and prior to that headed the Philippine Embassy in Brussels as ambassador to Belgium. His appointment was confirmed by the Commission on Appointments on February 4, 2025, and he presented his credentials to French President Emmanuel Macron on September 1, 2025.

Notable diplomats who had been deployed to the embassy as ambassadors to France include Luis Moreno Salcedo, who was ambassador from 1969 to 1979, and Rosario G. Manalo, who would serve from 1990 to 1994. Before her death due to COVID-19 amid a pandemic of the disease, Foreign Affairs Secretary Teodoro Locsin Jr. had promised Bernardita Catalla, at the time serving at the Philippine embassy in Beirut, that he would lobby for her to be appointed as ambassador to France for her next assignment as an incentive to stay on as ambassador to Lebanon.

The embassy is one of the Philippines' largest missions, and many of its activities are connected to deepening and strengthening the deep cultural and economic ties between the Philippines and France. Among its activities include celebrating the Fête de la Musique with Filipino musicians, showcasing Philippine industrial design, promoting Filipino animated short films, and organizing an exhibit of pre-Hispanic artifacts at the Musée du Quai Branly – Jacques Chirac. In addition to these activities, the embassy also conducts activities for and promoting the large community of Filipinos in France, such as organizing a retrospective on the art and career of France-based Filipino artist Macario Vitalis.

In addition to France, the embassy has jurisdiction over Monaco, where it maintains an honorary consulate.

== See also ==
- France–Philippines relations
- Filipinos in France
- List of diplomatic missions of the Philippines
