= Andreas Eriksson (visual artist) =

Swedish contemporary artist

Andreas Eriksson is a Swedish contemporary visual artist. He is living in Medelplana, Sweden.

== Biography ==
Eriksson was born 1975 in Björsäter, Västergötland, Sweden.

Eriksson works mainly with painting, which is inspired by the nature surrounding his studio. He also works with sculpture, photography and weaving. Eriksson represented Sweden at the 2011 Venice Bienniale. In 2020, he had a major solo exhibition titled From Sketch to Tapestry at the Nordic Watercolour Museum on the island of Tjörn in Sweden.
