= Netherlands–Philippines relations =

- Netherlands: Philippines

The Netherlands–Philippines relations refers to the bilateral relations between the Netherlands and the Philippines.

== History ==
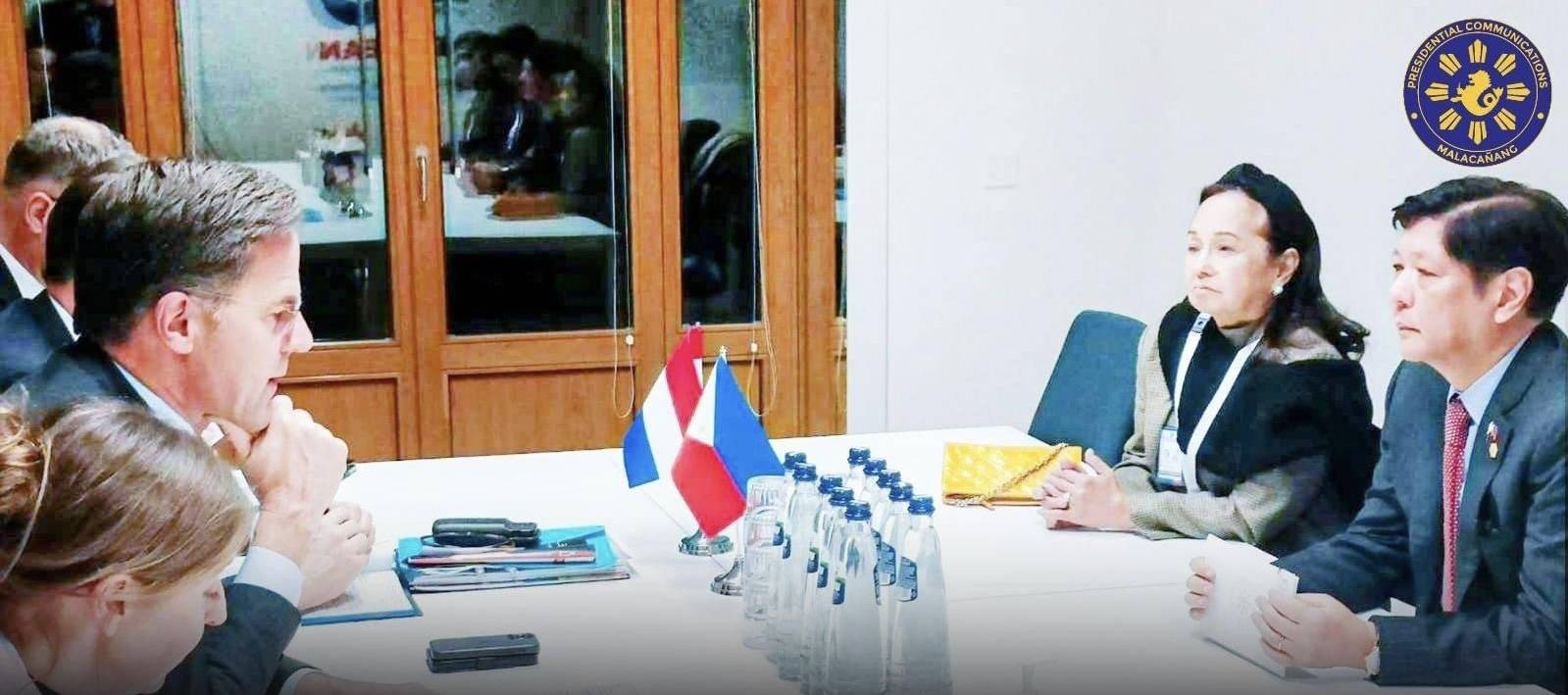
Then-Dutch prime minister Mark Rutte (left), Philippine president Bongbong Marcos (right), and former Philippine president Gloria Macapagal Arroyo (center) during a bilateral meeting in 2022

Early relations between the Netherlands and the Philippines can be traced as early as the 17th century when a Dutch warship raided Spanish outpost in the Philippines, until the independence of the Netherlands was acknowledged in the mid-17th century. Underground trade between the Dutch East Indies and the Philippines was mostly tolerated until the formalization of economic trade in 1866, with the establishment of a Dutch honorary consulate in Manila, van Polanen Petel as the first honorary consul.

The Philippines established its embassy in the Hague in May 1960, with the first Philippine ambassador presenting credentials to Queen Juliana.

== Economic relations ==
As of 2014, the Netherlands is the 3rd biggest investor in the Philippines and the 10th largest export partner of the Southeast Asian country.

== Security ties ==
The Dutch Foreign Ministry stated in their website that the only irritant in the relations between the Netherlands and the Philippines is the presence of what they called the said Philippine Communist leadership in Utrecht.

== Resident diplomatic missions ==
- the Netherlands has an embassy in Manila.
- Philippines has an embassy in The Hague.
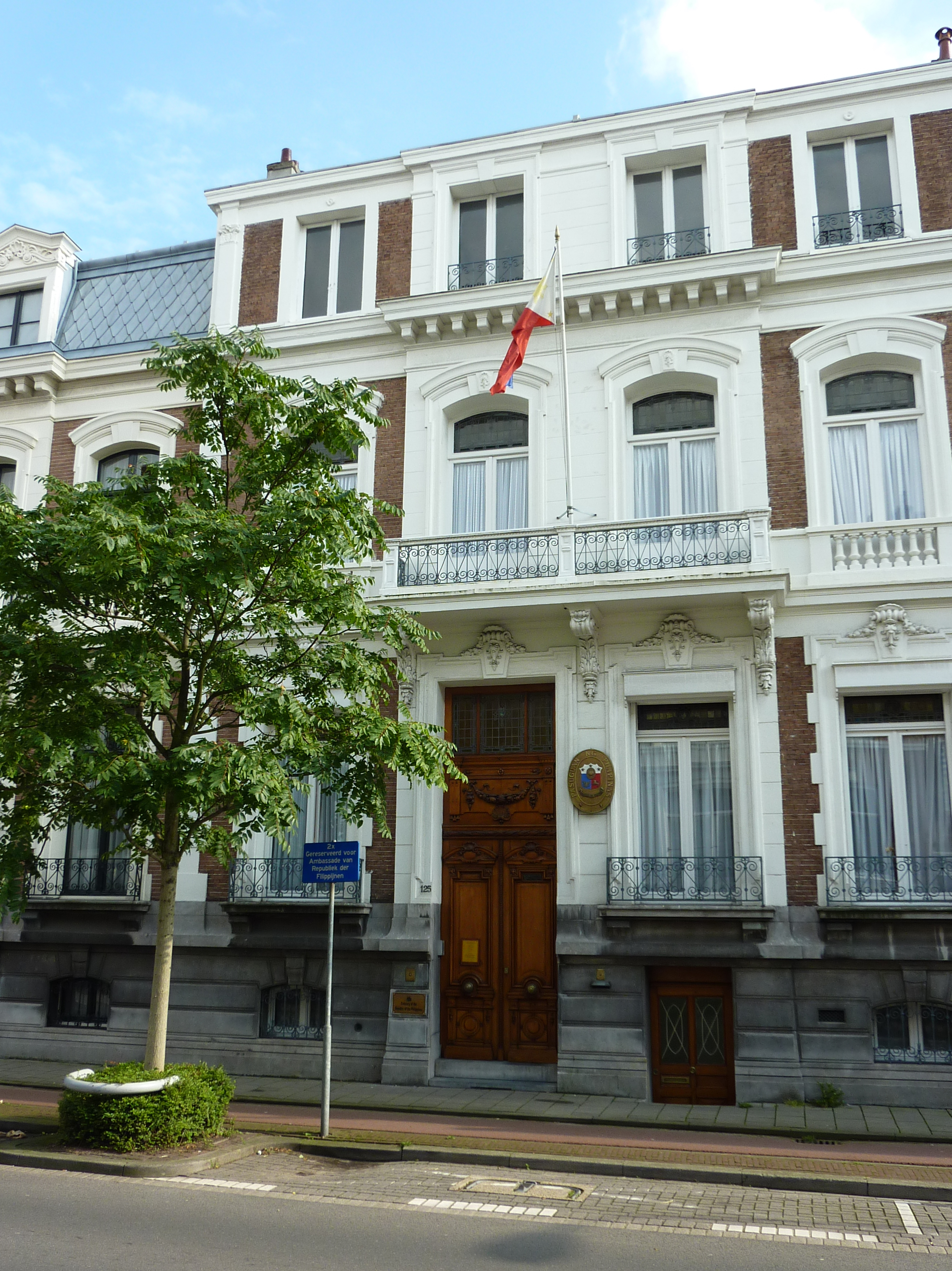
Embassy of the Philippines in The Hague

== See also ==
- Foreign relations of the Netherlands
- Foreign relations of the Philippines
- Filipinos in the Netherlands
