= Filipinos =

People of the Philippines

Mga Pilipino

Total population
- 117.7 million (c. 10 million in Filipino diaspora)

Regions with significant populations
- Philippines 100 million figures below are for various years
- United States: 2,922,680 (2022)
- Canada: 957,355 (2021)
- Saudi Arabia: 938,490 (2014)
- United Arab Emirates: 679,819
- Australia: 410,000
- Japan: 341,518 (2024)
- Malaysia: 325,089
- Kuwait: 241,999
- Qatar: 236,000
- Spain: 200,000 (2018)
- Singapore: 200,000
- United Kingdom: 164,000 (according to the 2021 UK census)
- Taiwan: 152,529 (2023)
- Hong Kong: 201,300
- New Zealand: 108,297 (2023)
- Italy: 100,859
- South Korea: 63,464
- Germany: 60,000
- France: 50,000 (2020)
- Bahrain: 40,000
- Brazil: 33,483 (2025)
- Norway: 31,982 (2025)
- Israel: 31,000
- Netherlands: 25,365 (2021)
- Papua New Guinea: 25,000
- Belgium: 19,772 (2019)
- Macau: 14,544
- Denmark: 13,844 (2025)
- Sweden: 13,000
- Ireland: 12,791
- Austria: 12,474
- China: 12,254
- Croatia: 12,000 (2025)
- Switzerland: 10,000
- Cayman Islands: 8,032
- Indonesia: 7,400 (2022)
- Kazakhstan: 7,000
- Palau: 7,000
- Greece: 6,500
- Finland: 5,665
- Turkey: 5,500
- Russia: 5,000
- Nigeria: 4,500
- Morocco: 3,000
- Iceland: 2,900
- Finland: 2,114
- Aruba: 754

Languages
- English, Filipino, and indigenous languages

Religion
- Predominantly Roman Catholicism; Minority others are: Protestantism; Islam; Iglesia ni Cristo; Mga Saksi ni Jehova; Members Church of God International; Iglesia Filipina Independiente; Indigenous Philippine folk religions; Buddhism; Taoism; Hinduism; Sikhism; Atheism

Related ethnic groups
- Taiwanese indigenous peoples, Austronesian peoples

Filipinos (Filipino: Mga Pilipino) are citizens or people identified and related with the country or sovereign state of the Philippines. Filipinos come from various Austronesian peoples, all typically speaking Filipino, English, or other Philippine languages. Despite formerly being subject to Spanish administration, less than 1% of Filipinos are fluent in Spanish. Currently, there are more than 185 ethnolinguistic groups in the Philippines each with its own language, identity, culture, tradition, and history.

== Names ==
The name Filipino, as a demonym, was derived from the term las Islas Filipinas 'the Philippine Islands', the name given to the archipelago in 1543 by the Spanish explorer and Dominican priest Ruy López de Villalobos, in honor of Philip II of Spain. During the Spanish period, natives of the Philippine islands were usually known in the Philippines itself by the generic terms indio ("Indian (native of the East Indies)") or indigena 'indigenous', while the generic term chino ("Chinese"), short for "indio chino" was used in Spanish America to differentiate from the Native American indios of the Spanish territories in the Americas and the West Indies. The term Filipino was sometimes added by Spanish writers to distinguish the indio chino native of the Philippine archipelago from the indio of the Spanish territories in the Americas. The term Indio Filipino appears as a term of self-identification beginning in the 18th century.

In 1955, Agnes Newton Keith wrote that a 19th century edict prohibited the use of the word "Filipino" to refer to indios. This reflected popular belief, although no such edict has been found. The idea that the term Filipino was not used to refer to indios until the 19th century has also been mentioned by historians such as Salah Jubair and Renato Constantino. However, in a 1994 publication the historian William Henry Scott identified instances in Spanish writing where "Filipino" did refer to "indio" natives. Instances of such usage include the Relación de las Islas Filipinas (1604) of Pedro Chirino, in which he wrote chapters entitled "Of the civilities, terms of courtesy, and good breeding among the Filipinos" (Chapter XVI), "Of the Letters of the Filipinos" (Chapter XVII), "Concerning the false heathen religion, idolatries, and superstitions of the Filipinos" (Chapter XXI), "Of marriages, dowries, and divorces among the Filipinos" (Chapter XXX), while also using the term "Filipino" to refer unequivocally to the non-Spaniard natives of the archipelago like in the following sentence:

The first and last concern of the Filipinos in cases of sickness was, as we have stated, to offer some sacrifice to their anitos or diwatas, which were their gods.

— Pedro Chirino, Relación de las Islas Filipinas

In the Crónicas (1738) of Juan Francisco de San Antonio, the author devoted a chapter to "The Letters, languages and politeness of the Philippinos", while Francisco Antolín argued in 1789 that "the ancient wealth of the Philippinos is much like that which the Igorots have at present". These examples prompted the historian William Henry Scott to conclude that during the Spanish period:

[...]the people of the Philippines were called Filipinos when they were practicing their own culture—or, to put it another way, before they became indios.

— William Henry Scott, Barangay- Sixteenth Century Philippine Culture and Society

While the Philippine-born Spaniards during the 19th century began to be called españoles Filipinos, logically contracted to just Filipino, to distinguish them from the Spaniards born in Spain, they themselves resented the term, preferring to identify themselves as "hijo/s del país" ("sons of the country").

In the latter half of the 19th century, ilustrados, an educated class of mestizos (both Spanish mestizos and Sangley Chinese mestizos, especially Chinese mestizos) and indios arose whose writings are credited with building Philippine nationalism. These writings are also credited with transforming the term Filipino to one which refers to everyone born in the Philippines, especially during the Philippine Revolution and American Colonial Era and the term shifting from a geographic designation to a national one as a citizenship nationality by law. Historian Ambeth Ocampo has suggested that the first documented use of the word Filipino to refer to Indios was the Spanish-language poem A la juventud filipina, published in 1879 by José Rizal. Writer and publisher Nick Joaquin has asserted that Luis Rodríguez Varela was the first to describe himself as Filipino in print. Apolinario Mabini (1896) used the term Filipino to refer to all inhabitants of the Philippines. Father Jose Burgos earlier called all natives of the archipelago as Filipinos. In Wenceslao Retaña's Diccionario de filipinismos, he defined Filipinos as follows,

todos los nacidos en Filipinas sin distincion de origen ni de raza.
All those born in the Philippines without distinction of origin or race.

— Wenceslao E. Retaña, Diccionario De Filipinismos: Con La Revisión De Lo Que Al Respecto Lleva Publicado La Real Academia Española

American authorities during the American colonial era also started to colloquially use the term Filipino to refer to the native inhabitants of the archipelago, but despite this, it became the official term for all citizens of the sovereign independent Republic of the Philippines, including non-native inhabitants of the country as per the Philippine nationality law. However, the term has been rejected as an identification in some instances by minorities who did not come under Spanish control, such as the Igorot and Muslim Moros.

The lack of the letter "F" in the 1940–1987 standardized Tagalog alphabet (Abakada) caused the letter "P" to be substituted for "F", though the alphabets or writing scripts of some non-Tagalog ethnic groups included the letter "F". Upon official adoption of the modern, 28-letter Filipino alphabet in 1987, the term Filipino was preferred over Pilipino. Locally, some still use "Filipino" to refer to the people and "Pilipino" to refer to the language, but in international use "Filipino" is the usual form for both.

A number of Filipinos refer to themselves colloquially as "Pinoy" (feminine: "Pinay"), which is a slang word formed by taking the last four letters of "Filipino" and adding the diminutive suffix "-y". Or the non-gender or gender fluid form Pinxy (seldom used in the country but used amongst Filipino-American communities).

In 2020, the neologism Filipinx appeared; a demonym applied only to those of Filipino heritage in the diaspora and specifically referring to and coined by Filipino Americans imitating Latinx, itself a recently coined gender-inclusive alternative to Latino or Latina. An online dictionary made an entry of the term, applying it to all Filipinos within the Philippines or in the diaspora. In actual practice, however, the term is unknown among and not applied to Filipinos living in the Philippines, and Filipino itself is already treated as gender-neutral. The dictionary entry resulted in confusion, backlash and ridicule from Filipinos residing in the Philippines who never identified themselves with the foreign term.

Native Filipinos were also called Manilamen (or Manila men) by English-speaking regions or Tagalas by Spanish-speakers during the colonial era. They were mostly sailors and pearl-divers and established communities in various ports around the world. One of the notable settlements of Manilamen is the community of Saint Malo, Louisiana, founded at around 1763 to 1765 by escaped slaves and deserters from the Spanish Navy. There were also significant numbers of Manilamen in Northern Australia and the Torres Strait Islands in the late 1800s who were employed in the pearl hunting industries.

In Mexico (especially in the Mexican states of Guerrero and Colima), Filipino immigrants arriving to New Spain during the 16th and 17th centuries via the Manila galleons were called chino, which led to the confusion of early Filipino immigrants with that of the much later Chinese immigrants to Mexico from the 1880s to the 1940s. A genetic study in 2018 has also revealed that around one-third of the population of Guerrero have 10% Filipino ancestry.

== History ==
=== Prehistory ===
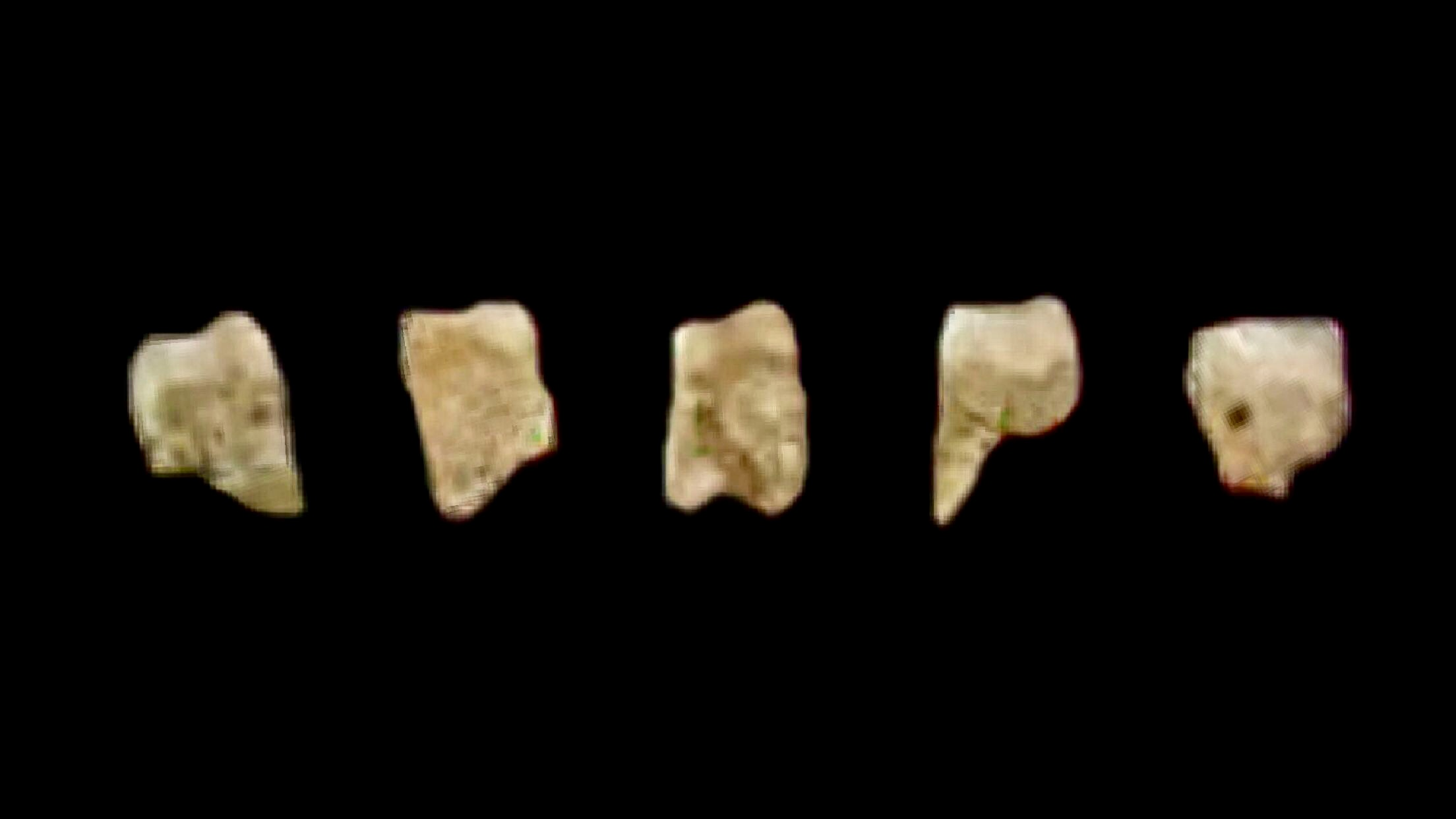
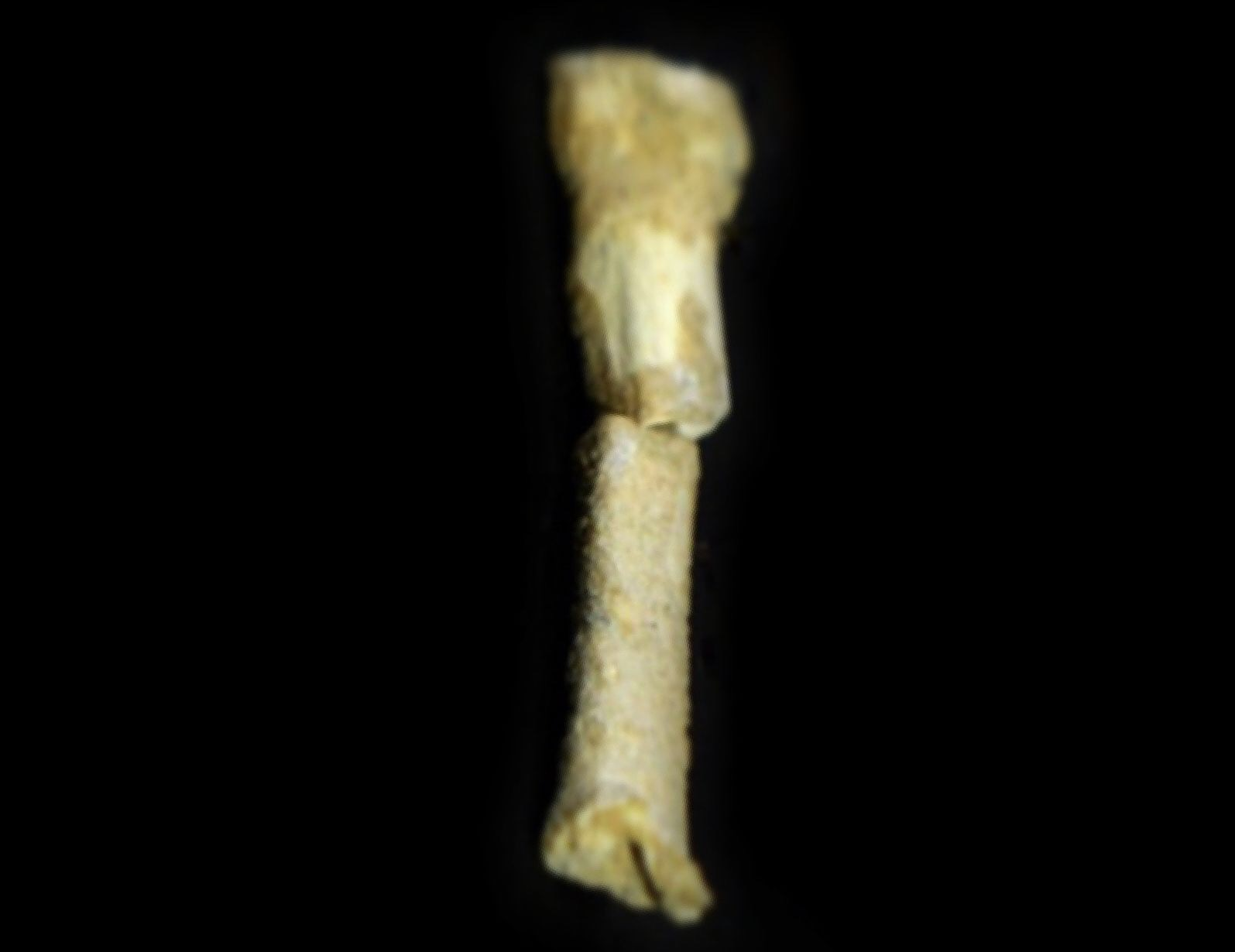
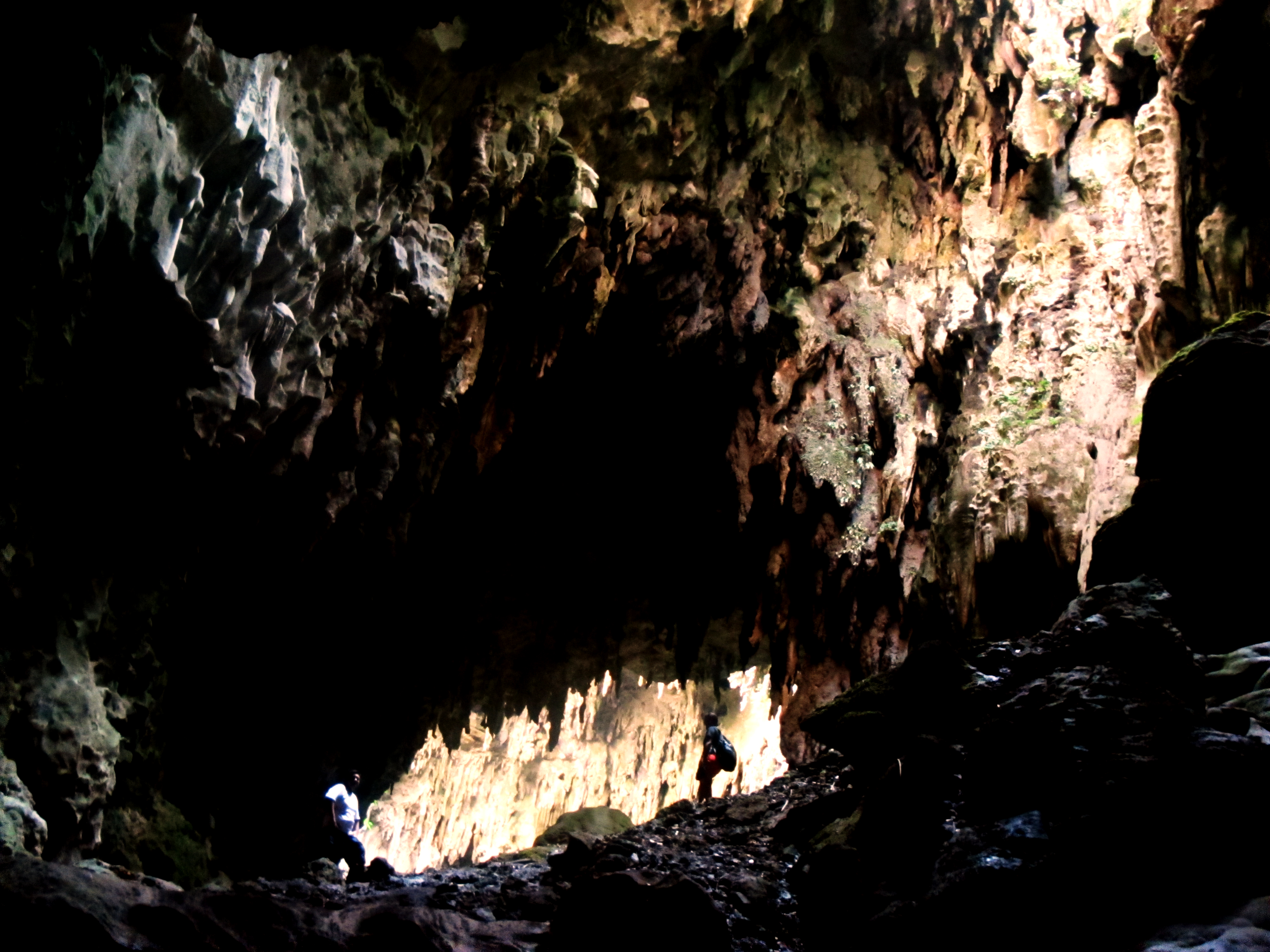
Left to right: [1] Five teeth attributed to Homo luzonensis; [2] CCH1, a third metatarsal bone (MT3) discovered on May 5, 2007, in Callao Cave, belonging to Homo luzonensis, a species of archaic human; [3] Callao Cave .

The oldest archaic human remains in the Philippines are the "Callao Man" specimens discovered in 2007 in the Callao Cave in Northern Luzon. They were dated in 2010 through uranium-series dating to the Late Pleistocene, c. 67,000 years old. The remains were initially identified as modern human, but after the discovery of more specimens in 2019, they have been reclassified as being members of a new species – Homo luzonensis.

The oldest indisputable modern human (Homo sapiens) remains in the Philippines are the "Tabon Man" fossils discovered in the Tabon Caves in the 1960s by Robert B. Fox, an anthropologist from the National Museum. These were dated to the Paleolithic, at around 26,000 to 24,000 years ago. The Tabon Cave complex also indicates that the caves were inhabited by humans continuously from at least 47,000 ± 11,000 years ago to around 9,000 years ago. The caves were also later used as a burial site by unrelated Neolithic and Metal Age cultures in the area.

Migration of the sea-faring Austronesian peoples and their languages.

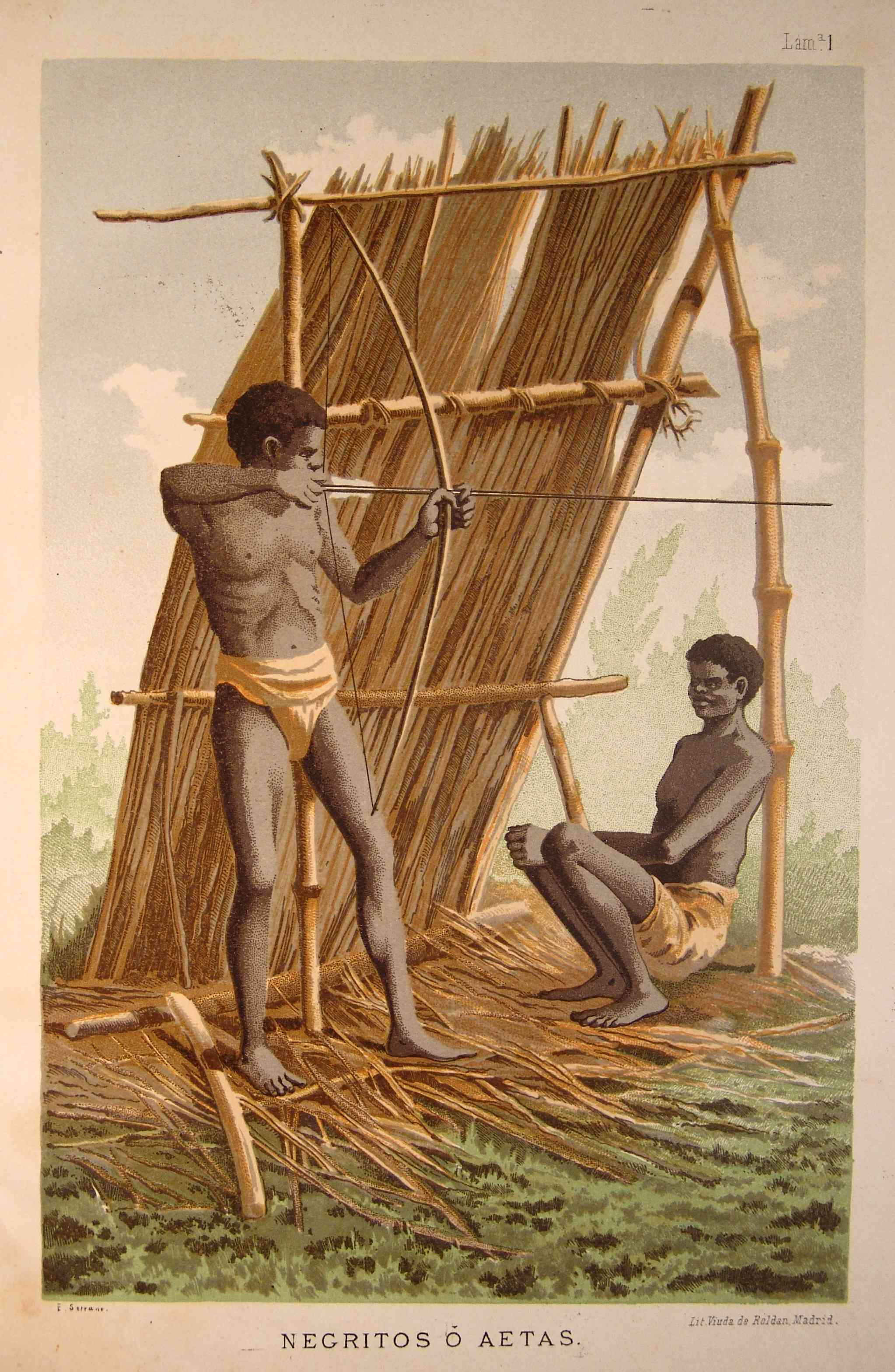
The Negritos are descendants of one of the earliest groups of modern humans to reach the Philippines

The Tabon Cave remains (along with the Niah Cave remains of Borneo and the Tam Pa Ling remains of Laos) are part of the "First Sundaland People", the earliest branch of anatomically modern humans to reach Island Southeast Asia at the time of lowered sea levels of Sundaland, with only one 3 km sea crossing. They entered the Philippines from Borneo via Palawan at around 50,000 to 40,000 years ago. Their descendants are collectively known as the Negrito people, although they are highly genetically divergent from each other. Philippine Negritos show a high degree of Denisovan Admixture, similar to Papuans and Indigenous Australians, in contrast to Malaysian and Andamanese Negritos (the Orang Asli). This indicates that Philippine Negritos, Papuans, and Indigenous Australians share a common ancestor that admixed with Denisovans at around 44,000 years ago. Negritos include ethnic groups like the Aeta (including the Agta, Arta, Dumagat, etc.) of Luzon, the Ati of Western Visayas, the Batak of Palawan, and the Mamanwa of Mindanao. Today they comprise just 0.03% of the total Philippine population.

After the Negritos, were two early Paleolithic migrations from East Asian (basal Austric, an ethnic group which includes Austroasiatics) people, they entered the Philippines at around 15,000 and 12,000 years ago, respectively. Like the Negritos, they entered the Philippines during the lowered sea levels during the last ice age, when the only water crossings required were less than 3 km wide (such as the Sibutu strait). (Note: Larena, Maximilian; Sanchez-Quinto, Federico; Sjödin, Per; McKenna, James; Ebeo, Carlo; Reyes, Rebecca; Casel, Ophelia; Huang, Jin-Yuan; Hagada, Kim Pullupul; Guilay, Dennis; Reyes, Jennelyn; Allian, Fatima Pir; Mori, Virgilio; Azarcon, Lahaina Sue; Manera, Alma; Terando, Celito; Jamero, Lucio; Sireg, Gauden; Manginsay-Tremedal, Renefe; Labos, Maria Shiela; Vilar, Richard Dian; Latiph, Acram; Saway, Rodelio Linsahay; Marte, Erwin; Magbanua, Pablito; Morales, Amor; Java, Ismael; Reveche, Rudy; Barrios, Becky; Burton, Erlinda; Salon, Jesus Christopher; Kels, Ma. Junaliah Tuazon; Albano, Adrian; Cruz-Angeles, Rose Beatrix; Molanida, Edison; Granehäll, Lena; Vicente, Mário; Edlund, Hanna; Loo, Jun-Hun; Trejaut, Jean; Ho, Simon Y. W.; Reid, Lawrence; Malmström, Helena; Schlebusch, Carina; Lambeck, Kurt; Endicott, Phillip; Jakobsson, Mattias (March 30, 2021). "Multiple migrations to the Philippines during the last 50,000 years". Proceedings of the National Academy of Sciences. 118 (13) e2026132118. Bibcode:2021PNAS..11826132L. doi:10.1073/pnas.2026132118. hdl:1885/293505. ISSN 0027-8424. PMC 8020671. PMID 33753512. p. 24. "Supplementary Information for Multiple migrations to the Philippines during the last 50,000 years" (PDF). Archived from the original (PDF) on July 1, 2021.) They retain partial genetic signals among the Manobo people and the Sama-Bajau people of Mindanao.

The last wave of prehistoric migrations to reach the Philippines was the Austronesian expansion which started in the Neolithic at around 4,500 to 3,500 years ago, when a branch of Austronesians from Taiwan (the ancestral Malayo-Polynesian-speakers) migrated to the Batanes Islands and Luzon. They spread quickly throughout the rest of the islands of the Philippines and became the dominant ethnolinguistic group. They admixed with the earlier settlers, resulting in the modern Filipinos – which though predominantly genetically Austronesian still show varying genetic admixture with Negritos (and vice versa for Negrito ethnic groups which show significant Austronesian admixture). Austronesians possessed advanced sailing technologies and colonized the Philippines via sea-borne migration, in contrast to earlier groups.

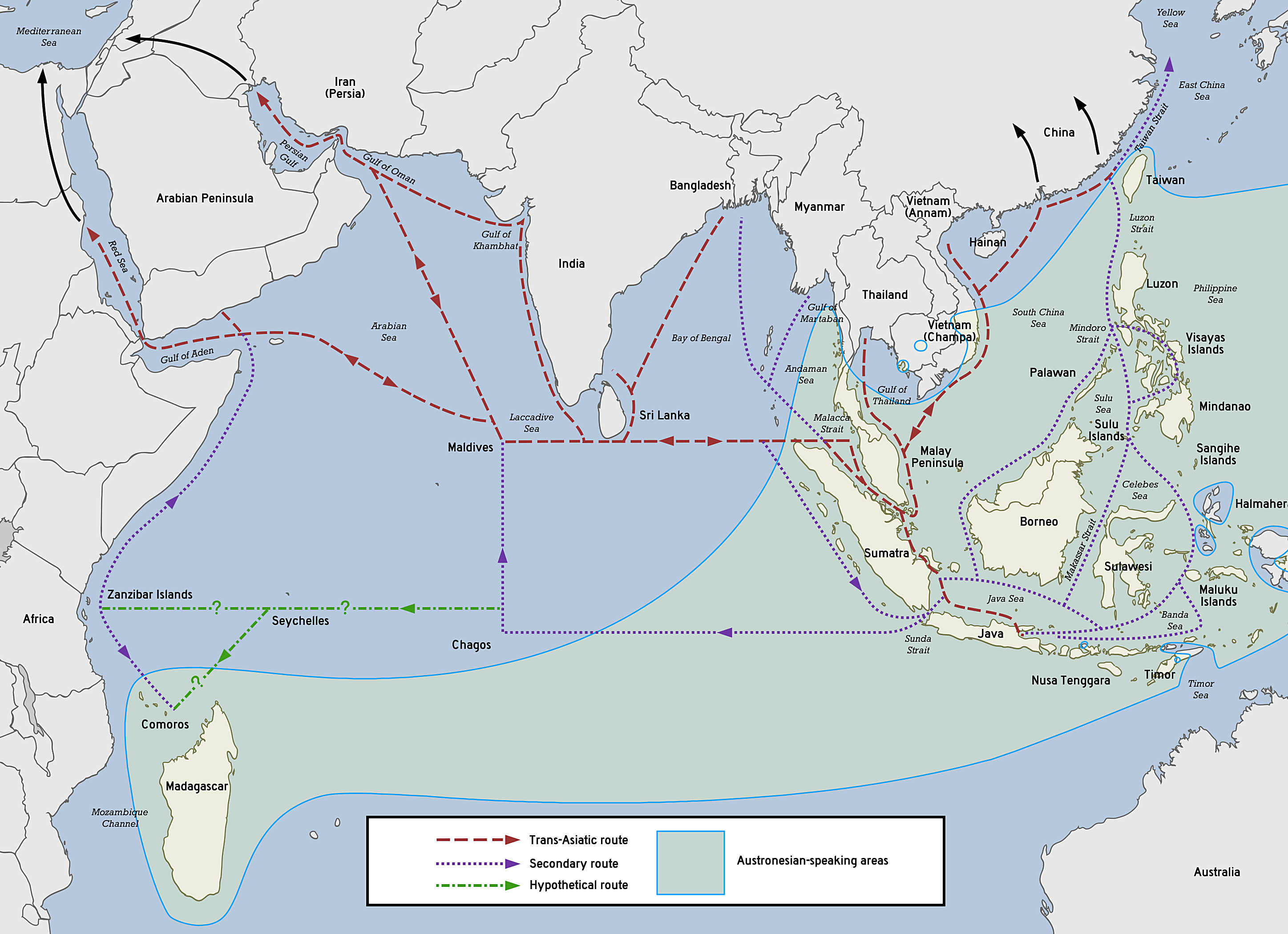
Austronesian trade networks

Austronesians from the Philippines also later settled Guam and the other islands of Maritime Southeast Asia, and parts of Mainland Southeast Asia. From there, they colonized the rest of Austronesia, which in modern times include Micronesia, coastal New Guinea, Island Melanesia, Polynesia, and Madagascar, in addition to Maritime Southeast Asia and Taiwan.

The connections between the various Austronesian peoples have also been known since the colonial era due to shared material culture and linguistic similarities of various peoples of the islands of the Indo-Pacific, leading to the designation of Austronesians as the "Malay race" (or the "Brown race") during the age of scientific racism by Johann Friedrich Blumenbach. Due to the colonial American education system in the early 20th century, the term "Malay race" is still used incorrectly in the Philippines to refer to the Austronesian peoples, leading to confusion with the non-indigenous Melayu people.

=== Archaic epoch (to 1565) ===
Since at least the 3rd century, various ethnic groups established several communities. These were formed by the assimilation of various native Philippine kingdoms. South Asian and East Asian people together with the people of the Indonesian archipelago and the Malay Peninsula, traded with Filipinos and introduced Hinduism and Buddhism to the native tribes of the Philippines. Most of these people stayed in the Philippines where they were slowly absorbed into local societies.

Many of the barangay (tribal municipalities) were, to a varying extent, under the de jure jurisprudence of one of several neighboring empires, among them the Malay Srivijaya, Javanese Majapahit, Brunei, Malacca, Tamil Chola, Champa and Khmer empires, although de facto had established their own independent system of rule. Trading links with Sumatra, Borneo, Java, Cambodia, Malay Peninsula, Indochina, China, Japan, India and Arabia. A thalassocracy had thus emerged based on international trade.

Even scattered barangays, through the development of inter-island and international trade, became more culturally homogeneous by the 4th century. Hindu-Buddhist culture and religion flourished among the noblemen in this era.

In the period between the 7th to the beginning of the 15th centuries, numerous prosperous centers of trade had emerged, including the Kingdom of Namayan which flourished alongside Manila Bay, Cebu, Iloilo, Butuan, the Kingdom of Sanfotsi situated in Pangasinan, the Kingdom of Luzon now known as Pampanga which specialized in trade with most of what is now known as Southeast Asia and with China, Japan and the Kingdom of Ryukyu in Okinawa.

From the 9th century onwards, a large number of Arab traders from the Middle East settled in the Malay Archipelago and intermarried with the local Malay, Bruneian, Malaysian, Indonesian and Luzon and Visayas indigenous populations.

In the years leading up to 1000 AD, there were already several maritime societies existing in the islands but there was no unifying political state encompassing the entire Philippine archipelago. Instead, the region was dotted by numerous semi-autonomous barangays (settlements ranging in size from villages to city-states) under the sovereignty of competing thalassocracies ruled by datus, rajahs or sultans or by upland agricultural societies ruled by "petty plutocrats". Nations such as the Wangdoms of Pangasinan and Ma-i as well as Ma-i's subordinates, the Barangay states of Pulilu and Sandao; the Kingdoms of Maynila, Namayan, and Tondo; the Kedatuans of Madja-as, Dapitan, and Cainta; the Rajahnates of Cebu, Butuan and Sanmalan; and the Sultanates of Buayan, Maguindanao, Lanao and Sulu; existed alongside the highland societies of the Ifugao and Mangyan. Some of these regions were part of the Malayan empires of Srivijaya, Majapahit and Brunei.

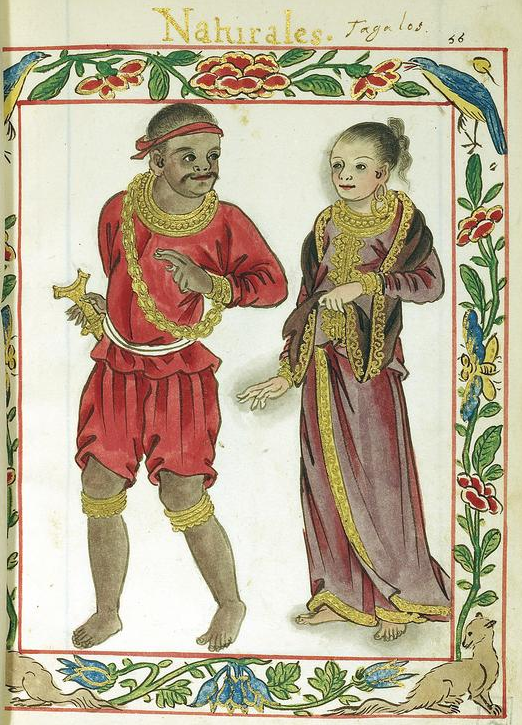
Tagalog maharlika, c.1590 Boxer Codex

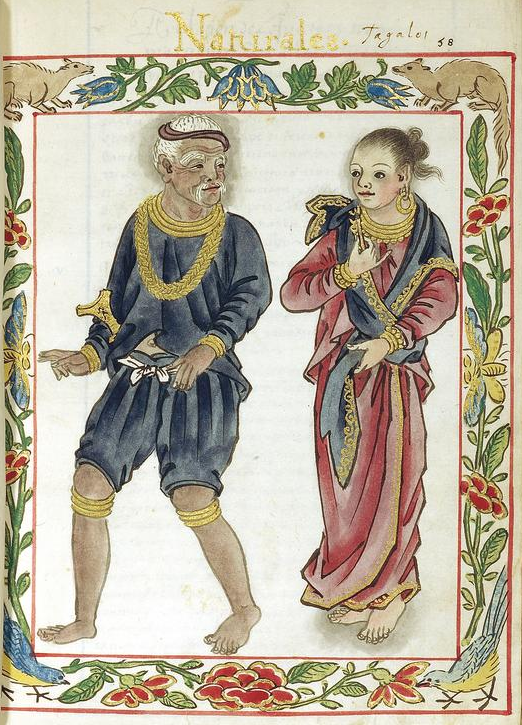
Tagalog maginoo, c.1590 Boxer Codex

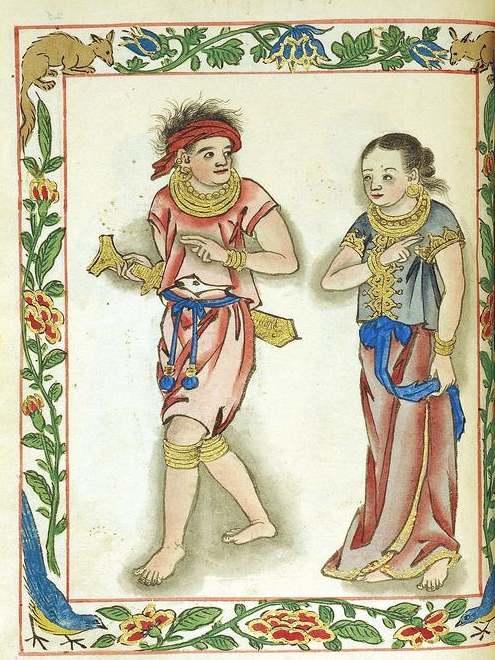
Visayan kadatuan, c.1590 Boxer Codex

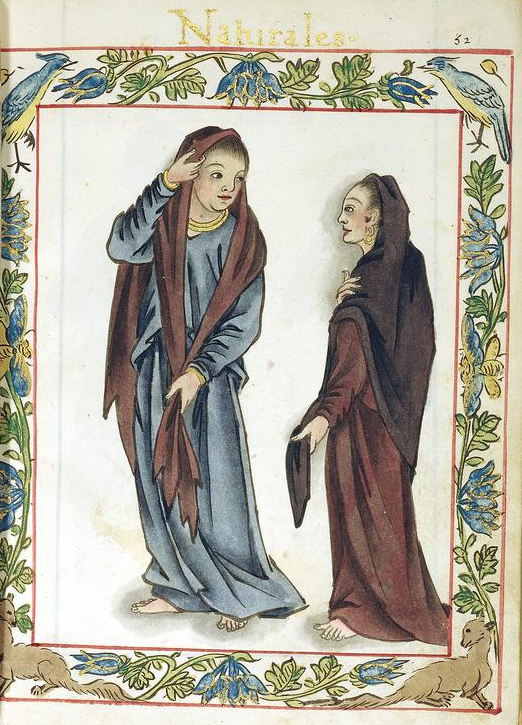
Native commoner women, c.1590 Boxer Codex

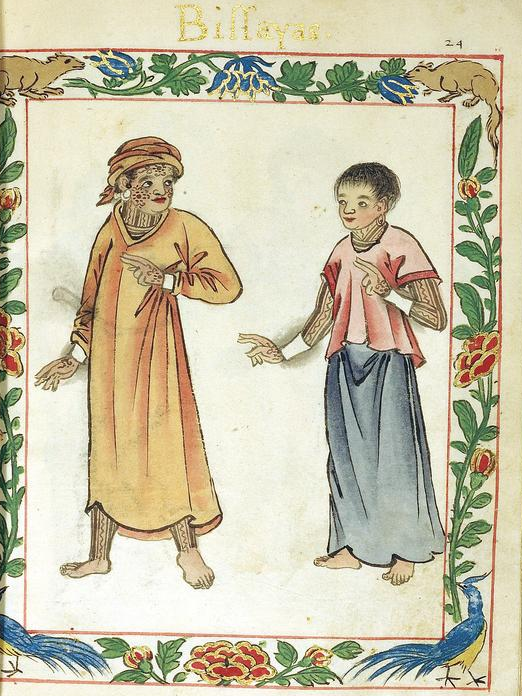
Visayan timawa, c.1590 Boxer Codex

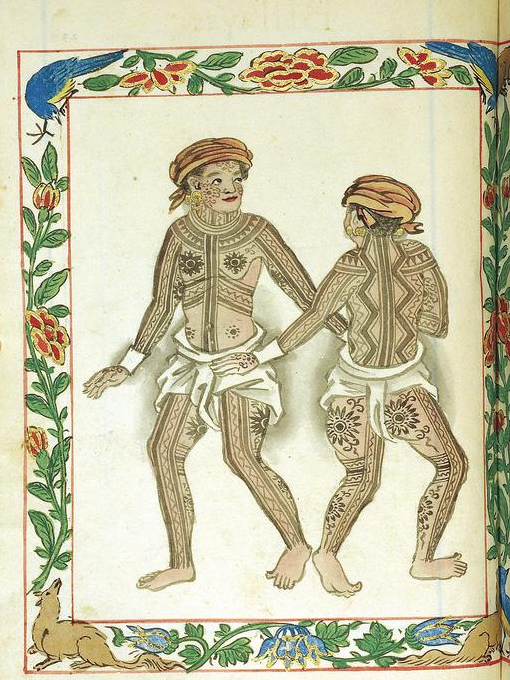
Visayan pintados (tattooed), c. 1590 Boxer Codex

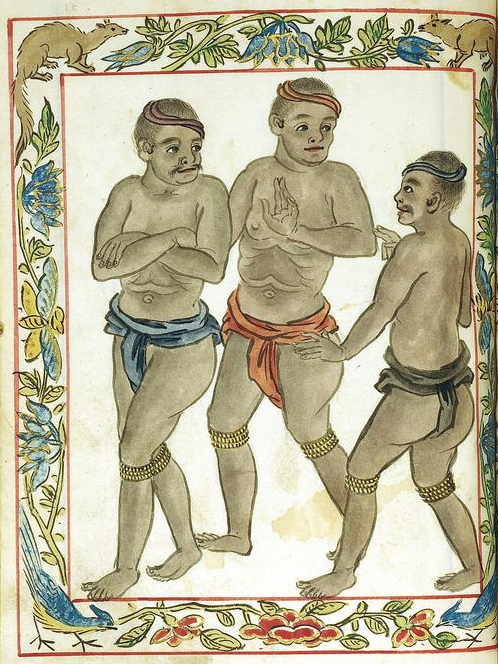
Visayan uripon (slaves), c. 1590 Boxer Codex

==== Historic caste systems ====
Datu – The Tagalog maginoo, the Kapampangan ginu and the Visayan tumao were the nobility social class among various cultures of the pre-colonial Philippines. Among the Visayans, the tumao were further distinguished from the immediate royal families or a ruling class.

Timawa – The timawa class were free commoners of Luzon and the Visayas who could own their own land and who did not have to pay a regular tribute to a maginoo, though they would, from time to time, be obliged to work on a datu's land and help in community projects and events. They were free to change their allegiance to another datu if they married into another community or if they decided to move.

Maharlika – Members of the Tagalog warrior class known as maharlika had the same rights and responsibilities as the timawa, but in times of war they were bound to serve their datu in battle. They had to arm themselves at their own expense, but they did get to keep the loot they took. Although they were partly related to the nobility, the maharlikas were technically less free than the timawas because they could not leave a datu's service without first hosting a large public feast and paying the datu between 6 and 18 pesos in gold – a large sum in those days.

Alipin – Commonly described as "servant" or "slave". However, this is inaccurate. The concept of the alipin relied on a complex system of obligation and repayment through labor in ancient Philippine society, rather than on the actual purchase of a person as in Western and Islamic slavery. Members of the alipin class who owned their own houses were more accurately equivalent to medieval European serfs and commoners.

By the 15th century, Arab and Indian missionaries and traders from Malaysia and Indonesia brought Islam to the Philippines, where it both replaced and was practiced together with indigenous religions. Before that, indigenous tribes of the Philippines practiced a mixture of Animism, Hinduism and Buddhism. Native villages, called barangays were populated by locals called Timawa (Middle Class/freemen) and Alipin (servants and slaves). They were ruled by Rajahs, Datus and Sultans, a class called Maginoo (royals) and defended by the Maharlika (Lesser nobles, royal warriors and aristocrats). These Royals and Nobles are descended from native Filipinos with varying degrees of Indo-Aryan and Dravidian, which is evident in today's DNA analysis among South East Asian Royals. This tradition continued among the Spanish and Portuguese traders who also intermarried with the local populations.

=== Spanish period (1521–1898) ===
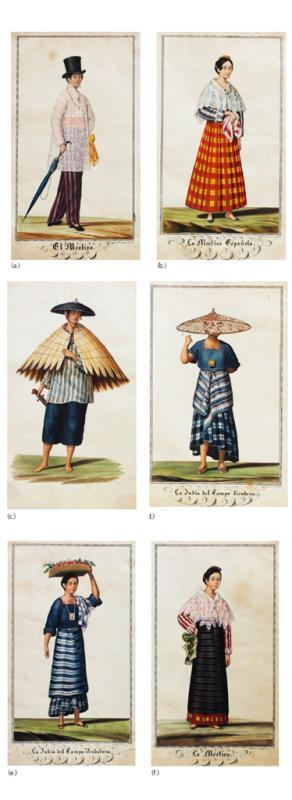
Tipos del País works by Justiniano Asuncion

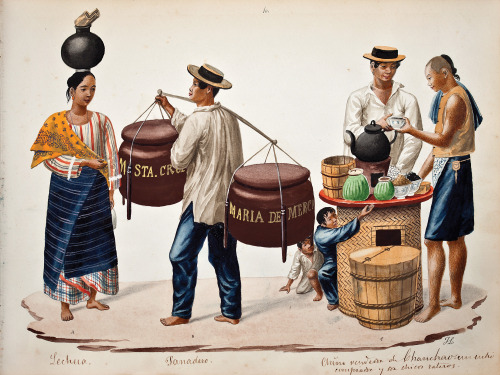
Economic life in the Spanish Philippines, with Native and Sangley Chinese traders

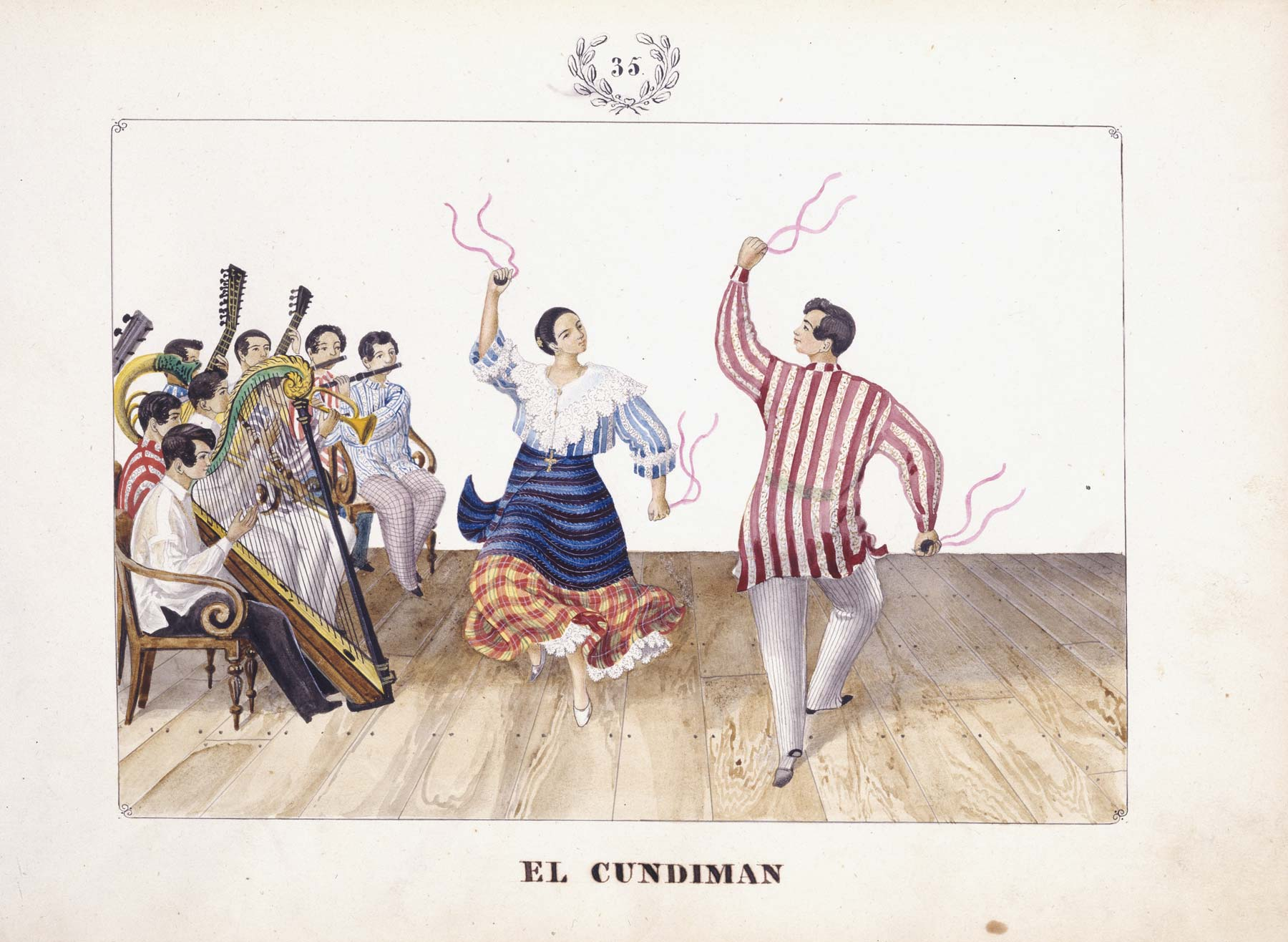
Depiction of Filipino celebration

The first census in the Philippines was in 1591, based on tributes collected. The tributes counted the total founding population of the Spanish Philippines as 667,612 people. 20,000 were Chinese migrant traders, at different times: around 15,600 individuals were Latino soldier-colonists who were cumulatively sent from Peru and Mexico and they were shipped to the Philippines annually, 3,000 were Japanese residents, and 600 were pure Spaniards from Europe. There was a large but unknown number of South Asian Filipinos, as the majority of the slaves imported into the archipelago were from Bengal and Southern India, adding Dravidian speaking South Indians and Indo-European speaking Bengalis into the ethnic mix.

The Philippines was governed by the Spaniards. The arrival of Portuguese explorer Ferdinand Magellan (Portuguese: Fernão de Magalhães) in 1521 began a period of European immigration. During the Spanish period, the Philippines was part of the Viceroyalty of New Spain, which was governed and administered from Mexico City. Early Spanish settlers were mostly explorers, soldiers, government officials and religious missionaries born in Spain and Mexico. Most Spaniards who settled were of Basque ancestry, but there were also settlers of Andalusian, Catalan, and Moorish descent. The Peninsulares (governors born in Spain), mostly of Castilian ancestry, settled in the islands to govern their territory. Most settlers married the daughters of rajahs, datus, and sultans to reinforce the alliances of the islands. The Ginoo and Maharlika castes (royals and nobles) in the Philippines prior to the arrival of the Spaniards formed the privileged Principalía (nobility) during the early Spanish period.

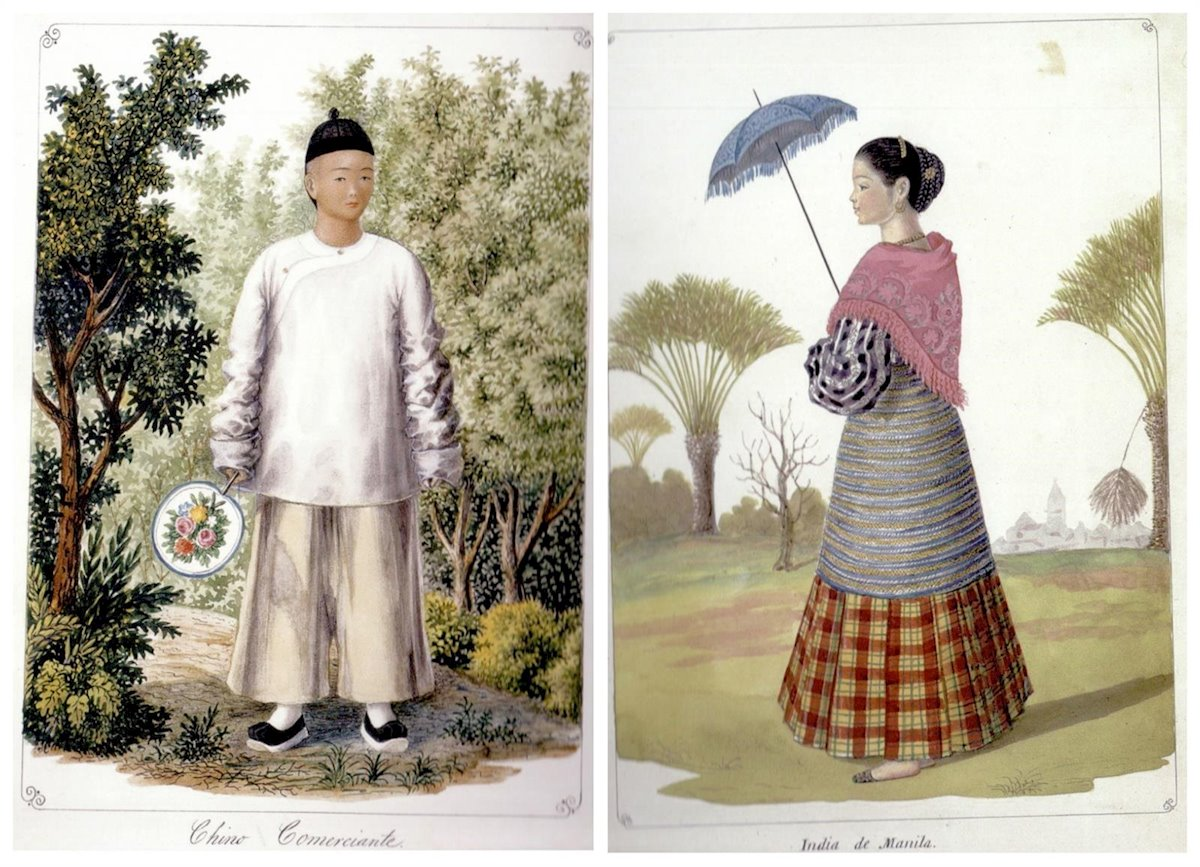
Sangley Chinese merchant and Native Filipina of Manila by José Honorato Lozano

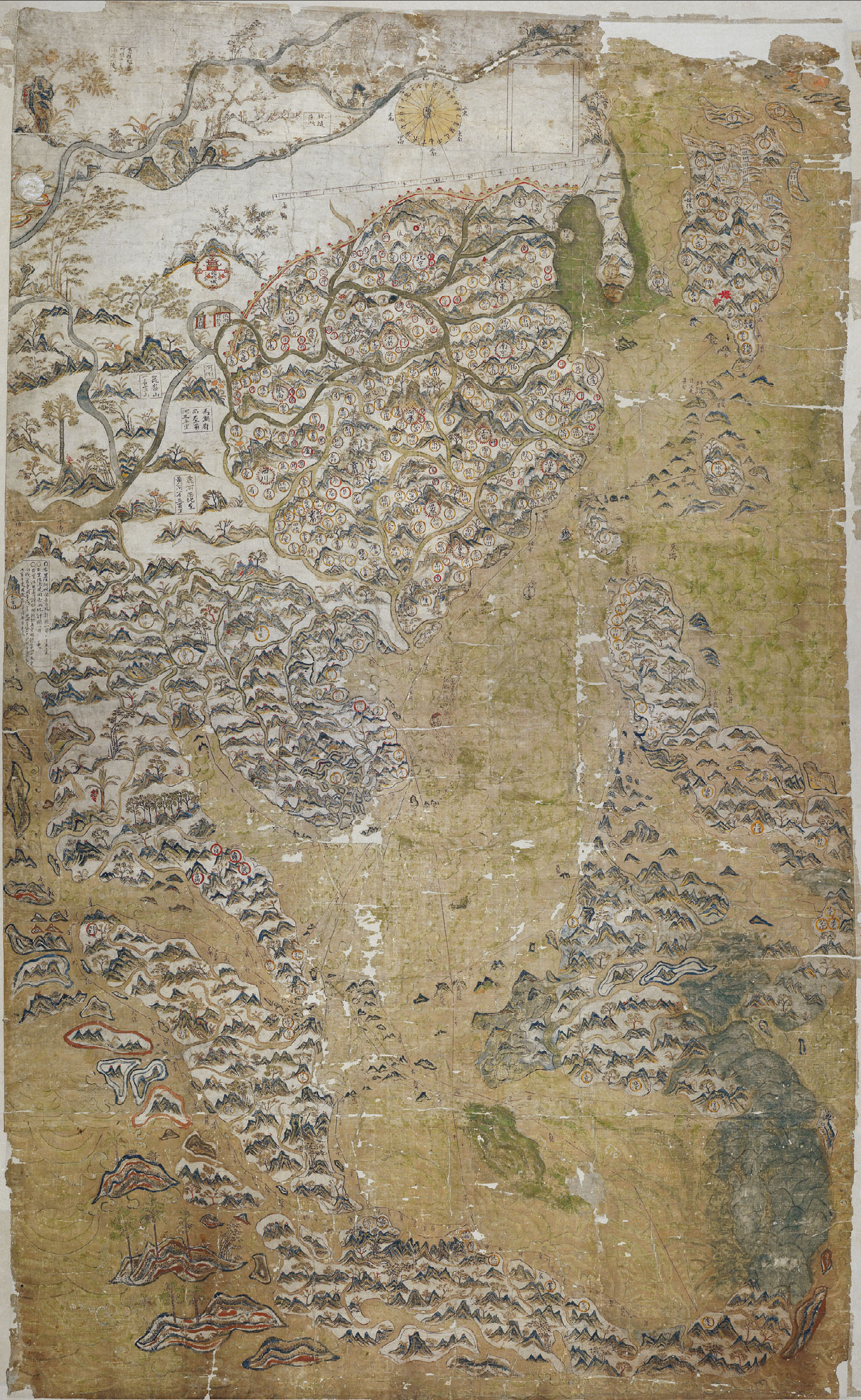
The Selden Map, connecting Quanzhou to Manila

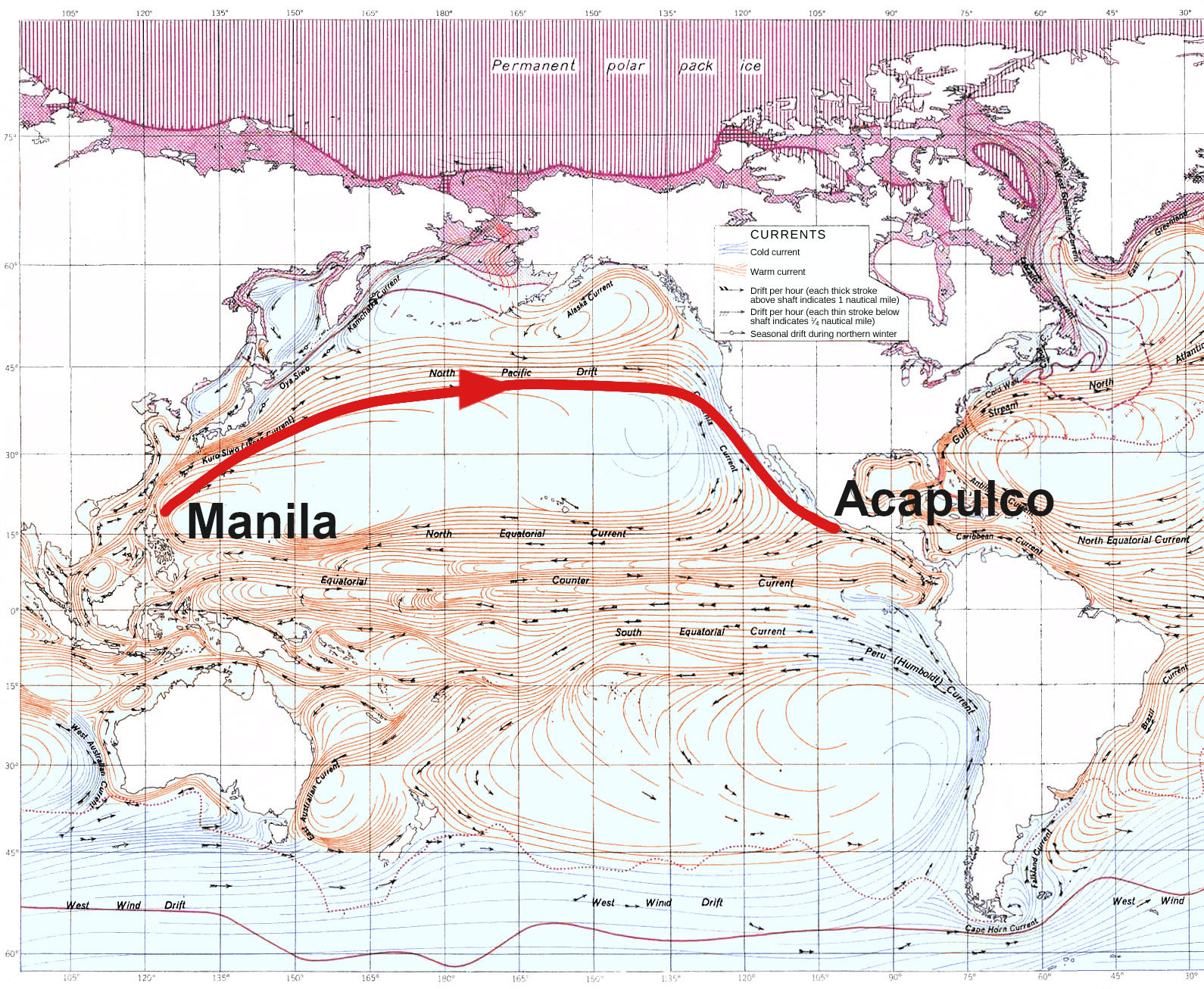
The Urdaneta return route of the Manila-Acapulco galleon trade, connecting the Philippines to the Americas

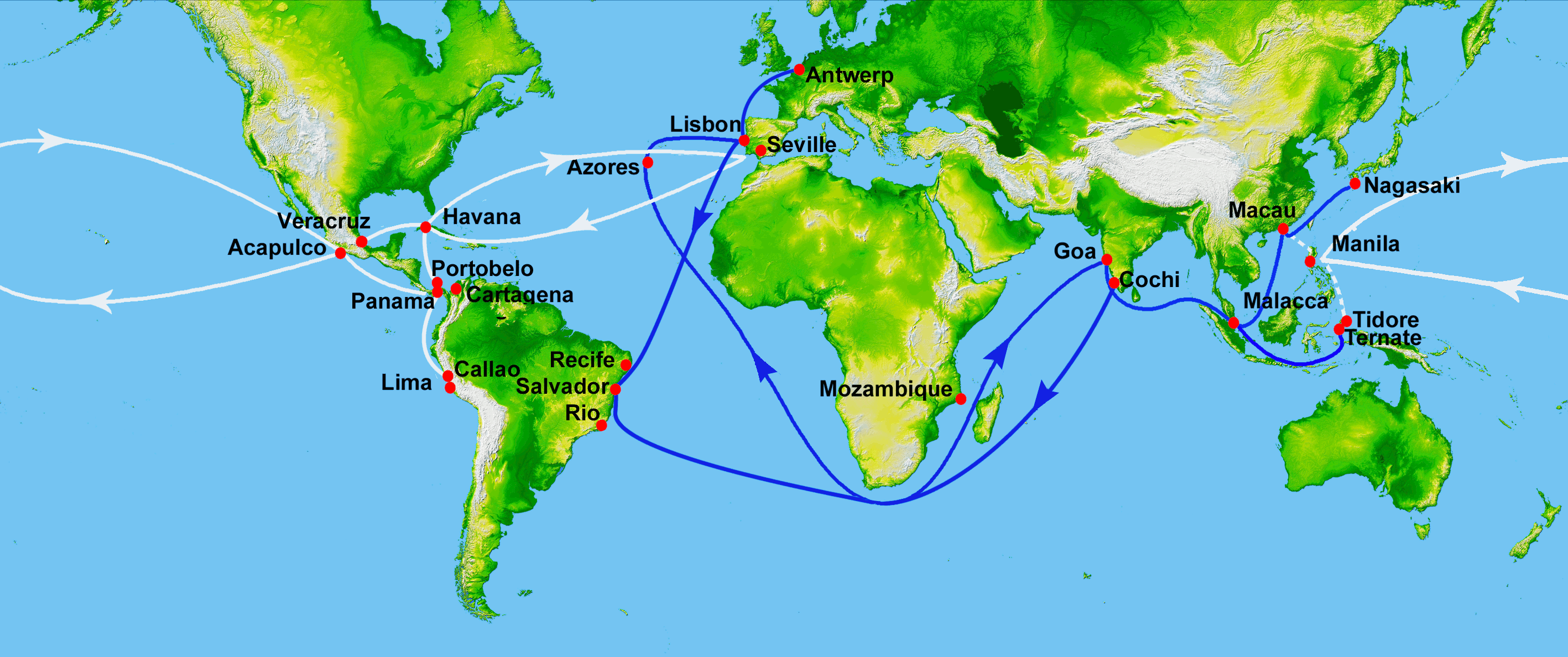
Global trade routes of the Spanish and Portuguese Empires

The arrival of the Spaniards to the Philippines, especially through the commencement of the Manila-Acapulco galleon trade that connected the Philippines through Manila to Acapulco in Mexico, attracted new waves of immigrants from China, as Manila was already previously connected to the Maritime Silk Road, as shown in the Selden Map, from Quanzhou and Zhangzhou in Southern Fujian to Manila, maritime trade flourished during the Spanish period, especially as Manila was connected to the ports of Southern Fujian, such as Yuegang (the old port of Haicheng in Zhangzhou, Fujian). The Spaniards recruited thousands of Chinese migrant workers from "Chinchew" (Quanzhou), "Chiõ Chiu" (Zhangzhou), "Canton" (Guangzhou), and Macau called sangleys (from Hokkien Chinese: 生理; Pe̍h-ōe-jī: Sng-lí; lit. 'business') to build the colonial infrastructure in the islands. Many Chinese immigrants converted to Christianity, intermarried with the locals, and adopted Hispanized names and customs and became assimilated, although the children of unions between Filipinos and Chinese that became assimilated continued to be designated in official records as mestizos de sangley. The Chinese mestizos were largely confined to the Binondo area until the 19th century. However, they eventually spread all over the islands and became traders, landowners and moneylenders. Today, their descendants still comprise a significant part of the Philippine population especially its bourgeois, who during the late Spanish Era in the late 19th century, produced a major part of the ilustrado intelligentsia of the late Spanish Philippines, that were very influential with the creation of Filipino nationalism and the sparking of the Philippine Revolution as part of the foundation of the First Philippine Republic and subsequent sovereign independent Philippines. Today, the bulk of the families in the list of the political families in the Philippines have such family background. Meanwhile, the Spanish-era Sangley's pure ethnic Chinese descendants of which, replenished by later migrants in the 20th century, that preserved at least some of their Chinese culture, integrated together with mainstream Filipino culture, are now in the form of the modern Chinese Filipino community, who currently play a leading role in the Philippine business sector and contribute a significant share of the Philippine economy today, where most in the current list of the Philippines' richest each year comprise Taipan billionaires of Chinese Filipino background, mostly of Hokkien descent, where most still trace their roots back to mostly Jinjiang or Nan'an within Quanzhou or sometimes Xiamen (Amoy) or Zhangzhou, all within Southern Fujian, the Philippines' historical trade partner with Mainland China.

In the 16th and 17th centuries, thousands of Japanese traders also migrated to the Philippines and assimilated into the local population. Many were assimilated throughout the centuries, especially through the tumultuous period of World War II. Today, there is a small growing Nikkei community of Japanese Filipinos in Davao with roots to the old Little Japan in Mintal or Calinan in Davao City during the American colonial period, where many had roots starting out in Abaca plantations or from workers of the Benguet Road (Kennon Road) to Baguio.

British forces occupied Manila between 1762 and 1764 as a part of the Seven Years' War. However, the only part of the Philippines which the British held was the Spanish capital of Manila and the principal naval port of Cavite, both of which are located by the Manila Bay. The war was ended by the Treaty of Paris (1763). At the end of the war the treaty signatories were not aware that Manila had been taken by the British and was being administered as a British colony. Consequently, no specific provision was made for the Philippines. Instead they fell under the general provision that all other lands not otherwise provided for be returned to the Spanish Empire. Many Indian Sepoy troops and their British captains mutinied and were left in Manila and some parts of the Ilocos and Cagayan. The Indian Filipinos in Manila settled at Cainta, Rizal and the ones in the north settled in Isabela. Most were assimilated into the local population. Even before the British invasion, there were already also a large but unknown number of Indian Filipinos as majority of the slaves imported into the archipelago were from Bengal or Southern India, adding Dravidian speaking South Indians and Indo-European speaking Bangladeshis into the ethnic mix.

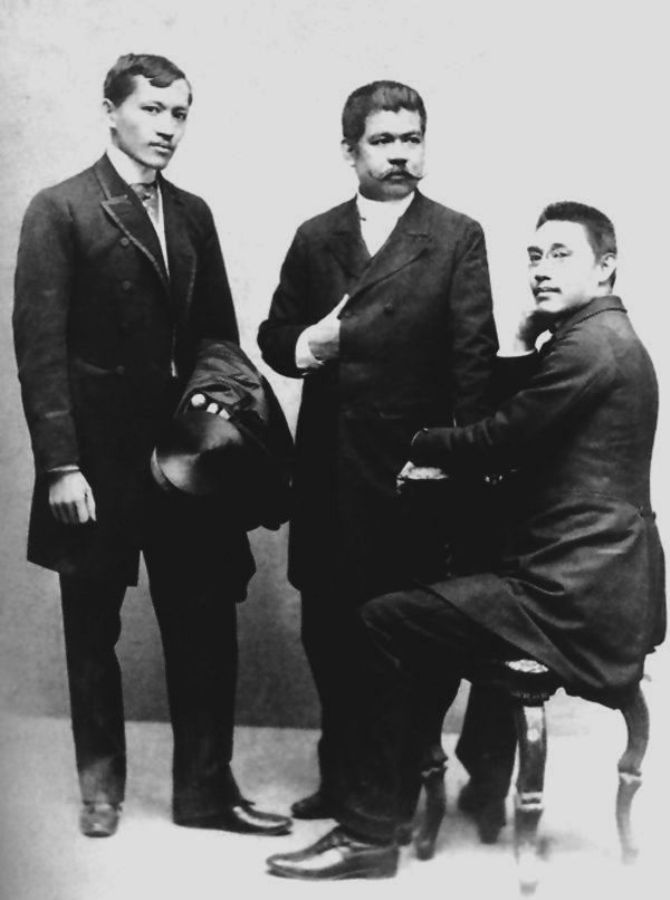
Leaders of the reform movement in Spain: left to right: José Rizal, Marcelo H. del Pilar, and Mariano Ponce (c. 1890)

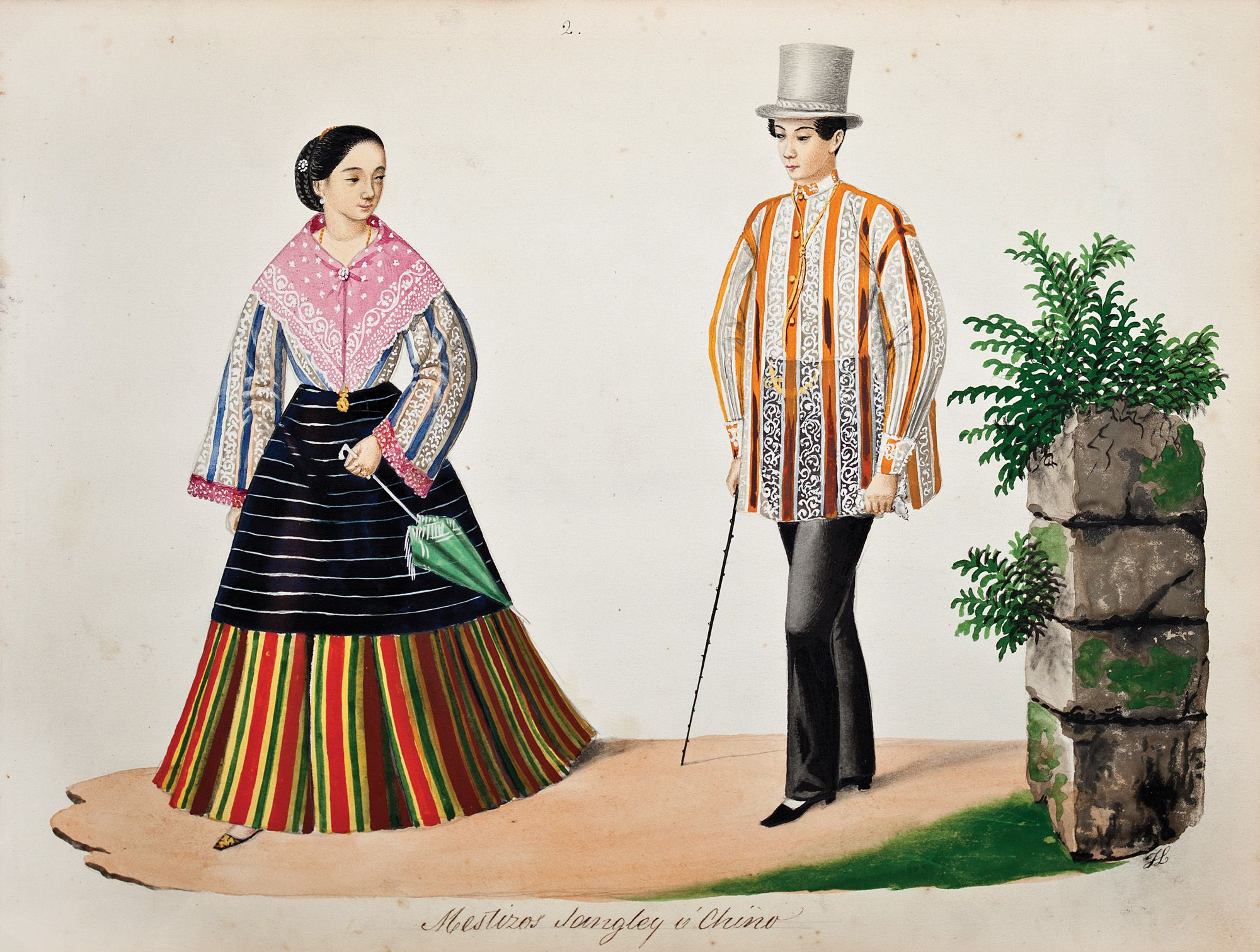
Mestizos Sangley y Chino (Sangley Chinese or Chinese Mestizos), c. 1841 Tipos del País, watercolor by Justiniano Asuncion

A total of 110 Manila-Acapulco galleons set sail between 1565 and 1815, during the Philippines trade with Mexico. Until 1593, three or more ships would set sail annually from each port bringing with them the riches of the archipelago to Spain. European criollos, mestizos and Portuguese, French and Mexican descent from the Americas, mostly from Latin America came in contact with the Filipinos. Japanese, Indian and Cambodian Christians who fled from religious persecutions and killing fields also settled in the Philippines during the 17th until the 19th centuries. The Mexicans especially were a major source of military migration to the Philippines and during the Spanish period they were referred to as guachinangos and they readily intermarried and mixed with native Filipinos. Bernal, the author of the book "Mexico en Filipinas" contends, that they were middlemen, the guachinangos in contrast to the Spanish and criollos, known as Castila, that had positions in power and were isolated, the guachinangos in the meantime, had interacted with the natives of the Philippines, while in contrast, the exchanges between Castila and native were negligent. Following Bernal, these two groups—native Filipinos and the Castila—had been two "mutually unfamiliar castes" that had "no real contact." Between them, he clarifies however, were the Chinese traders and the guachinangos (Mexicans). In the 1600s, Spain deployed thousands of Mexican and Peruvian soldiers across the many cities and presidios of the Philippines.

Geographic distribution and year of settlement of the Latin-American immigrant soldiers assigned to the Philippines in the 1600s.
Location	1603	1636	1642	1644	1654	1655	1670	1672
Manila	900	446	—	407	821	799	708	667
Fort Santiago	—	22	—	—	50	—	86	81
Cavite	—	70	—	—	89	—	225	211
Cagayan	46	80	—	—	—	—	155	155
Calamianes	—	—	—	—	—	—	73	73
Caraga	—	45	—	—	—	—	81	81
Cebu	86	50	—	—	—	—	135	135
Formosa	—	180	—	—	—	—	—	—
Moluccas	80	480	507	—	389	—	—	—
Otón	66	50	—	—	—	—	169	169
Zamboanga	—	210	—	—	184	—	—	—
Other	255	—	—	—	—	—	—	—
	—	—	—	—	—	—	—	—
Total Reinforcements	1,533	1,633	2,067	2,085	n/a	n/a	1,632	1,572

With the inauguration of the Suez Canal in 1867, Spain opened the Philippines for international trade. European investors of British, Dutch, German, Portuguese, Russian, Italian, and French nationality were among those who settled in the islands as business increased. More Spaniards and Chinese arrived during the next century. Many of these migrants intermarried with local mestizos and assimilated with the indigenous population.

In the late 1700s to early 1800s, Joaquín Martínez de Zúñiga, an Augustinian Friar, in his Two Volume Book: "Estadismo de las islas Filipinas" compiled a census of the Spanish-Philippines based on the tribute counts (Which represented an average family of seven to ten children and two parents, per tribute) and came upon the following statistics:

Data reported for the 1800 as divided by ethnicity and province
Province	Native Tributes	Spanish Mestizo Tributes	All Tributes (Note: Including others such as Latin-Americans and Chinese-Mestizos, pure Chinese paid tribute but were not Philippine citizens as they were transients who returned to China, and Spaniards were exempt)
Tondo	14,437-1/2	3,528	27,897-7
Cavite	5,724-1/2	859	9,132-4
Laguna	14,392-1/2	336	19,448-6
Batangas	15,014	451	21,579-7
Mindoro	3,165	3-1/2	4,000-8
Bulacan	16,586-1/2	2,007	25,760-5
Pampanga	16,604-1/2	2,641	27,358-1
Bataan	3,082	619	5,433
Zambales	1,136	73	4,389
Ilocos	44,852-1/2	631	68,856
Pangasinan	19,836	719-1/2	25,366
Cagayan	9,888	0	11,244-6
Camarines	19,686-1/2	154-1/2	24,994
Albay	12,339	146	16,093
Tayabas	7,396	12	9,228
Cebu	28,112-1/2	625	28,863
Samar	3,042	103	4,060
Leyte	7,678	37-1/2	10,011
Caraga	3,497	0	4,977
Misamis	1,278	0	1,674
Negros Island	5,741	0	7,176
Iloilo	29,723	166	37,760
Capiz	11,459	89	14,867
Antique	9,228	0	11,620
Calamianes	2,289	0	3,161
TOTAL	299,049	13,201	424,992-16

The Spanish-Filipino population as a proportion of the provinces widely varied; with as high as 19% of the population of Tondo province (The most populous province and former name of Manila), to Pampanga 13.7%, Cavite at 13%, Laguna 2.28%, Batangas 3%, Bulacan 10.79%, Bataan 16.72%, Ilocos 1.38%, Pangasinan 3.49%, Albay 1.16%, Cebu 2.17%, Samar 3.27%, Iloilo 1%, Capiz 1%, Bicol 20%, and Zamboanga 40%. According to the data, in the Archdiocese of Manila which administers much of Luzon under it, about 10% of the population was Spanish-Filipino. Across the whole Philippines, as estimated, the total ratio of Spanish Filipino tributes amount to 5% of the totality.

Felipe Bravo Census Demographics (Albay, 1818)
Provinces	Pueblos	Native Families	Spanish Filipino Families	Negrito Families	Chinese Filipino Families
Albay	Albay, Cabicera	5,515		2	2
	Manito	240	4		
	Bacon	2,119	45		
	Cuba	2,162	52		
	Casiguran	1,025	28		
	Juban	396	18		
	Sorsogon	1,783	149		
	Bulusan	1,777	19		
	Bulan	714	16		
	Donsol	241			
	Quipia	269			
	Lilog	821	33	23	
	Bacacay	1,295	77		
	Malilipot	981	53		
	Tabaco	3,347	225		
	Malitao	2,844	241		
	Tibi	2,069	157	110	
	Lagonoy y su anejo	1,669	18	521	
	San Jose	1,829	114	470	
	Caramoan	641		72	
Total		31,737	1,249	1,198	2

Felipe Bravo Census Demographics (Isla De Ticao, 1818)
Provinces	Pueblos	Native Families	Spanish Filipino Families	Negrito Families	Chinese Filipino Families
Isla de Ticao	San Jacinto	266	8		
Total		266	8		

Felipe Bravo Census Demographics (Isla De Masbate, 1818)
Provinces	Pueblos	Native Families	Spanish Filipino Families	Negrito Families	Chinese Filipino Families
Isla de Masbate	Mobo	912	1		
Total		912	1		

Felipe Bravo Census Demographics (Isla De Catanduanes, 1818)
Provinces	Pueblos	Native Families	Spanish Filipino Families	Negrito Families	Chinese Filipino Families
Isla De Catanduanes	Virac	1,581	91		
	Calolbon	847	3		
	Eiga	847	3		
	Payo y sus anejos Bagamanoc y Ooc	644	17		
	Pandan y Caramoan	489	2		
Total		4,408	116		

Felipe Bravo Census Demographics (Antique, 1818)
Provinces	Pueblos	Native Families	Spanish Filipino Families	Chinese Filipino Families
Antique	San José de Buenavista, cabecera	5,925	6	
	San Pedro de Balbalan	2,247		
	Sibalom	4,665	2	
	Patnongon y su visita Coritan	2,097	3	
	Bugason	3,060	1	
	San Antonio de Nalupa, su anejo Culari y visitas Tibiao, Bitad, Tun, Bacafan y Batunan	2,542	19	
	Pandan	300		
	Antique	2,304	12	
	Dao	1,296	7	
	Cagayan Chico en la isla del mismo nombre	527		
Total	(Across the Province)	24,963	50	40

Felipe Bravo Census Demographics (Bataan, 1818)
Provinces	Pueblos	Native Families	Spanish Filipino Families	Moreno Filipino Families	Negro (Black) Filipino Families	Chinese Filipino Families
Bataan	Balanga, cabecera	1,608	12		18	8
	Abucay	1,406	20		3	5
	Samar	1,000	4		1	
	Orani	1,000	25			8
	Llana-Hermosa	716	1			
	San Juan de Dinalupijan	451	19		7	3
	Pilar	899				
	Mariveles y su visita Morong	1,522	3	1	5	
	Orion ú Odiong	1,550	8	2	18	3
Total		10,152	92	3	52	27

Felipe Bravo Census Demographics (Batangas, 1818)
Provinces	Pueblos	Native Families	Spanish Filipino Families	Chinese Filipino Families
Batangas	Balayan, cabecera.	4,521	22	
	Lian.	629	7	
	Nasugbů.	866		2
	Rosario	1,758	4	
	Santo Tomas.	1,256		
	San Pablo de los Montes	1,948	7	
	Taal	8,312		
	Baoan ó Banang	5,813		
	Batangas	6,889		
	San José	2,427		
	Tanauan.	2,106		
	Lipa	4,104		
Total		40,629	40	2

Felipe Bravo Census Demographics (Bulacan, 1818)
Provinces	Pueblos	Native Families	Spanish Filipino Families	Converted Negro Families	Chinese Filipino Families
Bulacan	Bulacan, cabecera.	5,200			
	Bigáa.	1,876			
	Guiguinto.	1,291			
	Malolos.	8,110			
	Paombon.	1,058			
	Hagonoy.	4,572			
	Calumpít.	2,628			
	Quingua.	2,912			
	San Isidro.	2,560			
	Baliuag.	4,296			
	San Rafael.	1,650	10		
	Angat.	5,441			
	San José.	219			
	Santa María de Pandi.	1,588	17		
	Bocaue.	2,550	88		2
	Marilao.	881	28	5	1
	Meycauayan.	2,375	46		
	Polo.	3,160	44		4
	Obando.	2,493			
Total		54,360	233	5	7

Felipe Bravo Census Demographics (Cagayan, 1818)
Province	Pueblo	Native Families	Spanish Filipino Families
Cagayan	Lal-lo, cabecera.	975	313
	Camalaniugan.	1,156	
	Piat y su visita.	899	
	Tabang..	201	
	Cabagan.	3,543	
	Malaveg con su visita Mabanaug.	524	
	Tuao..	1,393	
	Iguig y su visita Amulong.	403	
	Tuguegarao.	5,072	
	Aparri..	1,715	
	Abulug.	1,162	1
	San Juan y su visita Masi.	913	
	Nasiping y su visita Gataran.	573	
	Ilagan..	1,150	
	Gamú y su visita Furao.	586	16
	Tumauini.	827	
	Bugay..	299	
	Aritao..	580	
	Dupax.	867	6
	Bambang..	893	
	Bayombong.	771	
	Lumabang.	332	
	Bagabag y su Fuerza.	508	
	Carig y su Fortaleza el Sto. Niño.	305	
	Camarag.	488	
	Angadanan.	320	
	Cauayan.	318	
	Calaniugan.	135	
TOTAL		26,726	336

Felipe Bravo Census Demographics (Calamianes, 1818)
Province	Pueblo	Native Families	Spanish Filipino Families
Islas de Calamianes
Calamianes	Culion en la de Calamianes, Isla de Linacapan, e Isla de Coron.	1,044	2
Isla de Paragua
	Taytay, Silanga, Meitejet, Pancol, Guinlo, y Barbacan.	1,424	4
Islas de Dumaran y Agutay
	Isla y pueblo de Dumaran e Isla y pueblo de Agutay.	632	
Islas de Cuyo
	Isla y pueblo de Cuyo y su anejo, Canipo, e Isla de Pagaguayan.	2,430	25
TOTAL		5,530	31

Felipe Bravo Census Demographics (Camarines, 1818)
Province	Pueblo	Native Families	Spanish Filipino Families	Lacandula Families	Negro Filipinos	Chinese Filipinos
Partido de Vicol (Ciudad de Nueva-Caceres)
Camarines	Tabaco y Santa Cruz.	3,593	301		4	3
	Naga.	956				
	Camaligan.	1,388				
	Canaman.	1,589				
	Magarao ó Mangarao.	1,862				
	Bombom ó Bonbon.	1,245				
	Quipayo.	784				
	Calabanga.	1,174				
	Libmanan ó Libnanan.	1,490	1			
	Milaor.	1,902	7			
	San Fernando.	688	2			
	Minalabag.	901				
Partido de la Rinconada
	Bula.	471				
	Bao ó Baao.	1,538	37		4	
	Nabua.	2,612	2		2	
	Iriga.	2,040	1			
	Buhi ó Buji.	1,979	10			
	Bato.	495				
Partido de la Iriga
	Libon.	410	4			
	Polangui.	2,903	15			
	Ors ú Oas.	3,614				
	Ligao.	2,968	24			
	Guinobatan.	2,605	1			
	Camalig.	2,330	39		9	
	Cagsava.	2,870				
Monte Isaroc
	Pueblo y Mision de Manguirin.	160			629	
	Goa, Tigabon y Tinambag.	1,123		2	625	
Partido de la Contra-Costa
	Sipocot, Lupi y Ragay.	406				
	Daet.	1,449	26		10	
	Talisay.	1,055	2			
	Indan.	675	6			
	Paracale.	697	34			
	Mambulao.	950				
	Capalonga.	137			4	
TOTAL		50,762	512	2	1,287	3

Felipe Bravo Census Demographics (Capiz, 1818)
Province	Pueblo	Native Families	Spanish Filipino Families	Lacandula Families	Negro Filipino families	Chinese Filipino families
Capiz	Capiz y su visita Ibisan.	2,650				
	Panay.	2,275				
	Panitan.	1,485				
	Dumalag y sus visitas Dao y Tapas.	3,158				
	Dumarao.	2,600				
	Mambusao y sus visitas Sigma y Jamindan.	1,924	13			
	Batan y su visita Sapiang.	2,255	56			
	Banga y su visita Madalag.	1,579	8			
	Malinao.	1,487	11			
	Calibo y su visita Macao.	2,700	167			
	Ibajay.	1,268	30			
Isla de Romblon
	Romblon.	1,514	15			
Isla de Sibuyan
	Cauit, Pagalar, y Cajidiocan.	1,114				
Isla de Banton
	Banton.					
Isla de Tablas
	Guintinguian, Aghagacay, Odiongan, Lanan, y Loog.					
Isla de Simara
	San José, Coloncolon.					
Isla del Maestre de Campo
	Sibali.					
TOTAL		26,009	285			

Felipe Bravo Census Demographics (Caraga, 1818)
Province	Pueblo	Native Families	Spanish Filipino Families	Lacandula Families	Negro Filipino families	Chinese Filipino families
Distrito de Surigao y Siargao
Caraga	Surigao (cabecera), Tagauan, Gigaquit ó Higaguit, Cabubungan, Isla y pueblo de Dinagat, Caco en la isla de Siargao, Dapa en dicha isla, Cabuntug en la misma isla, Sapao en la citada isla.	2,475	25			
Distrito de Butuan y Talacogon
	Butuan, Habungan, Tabay, Maynio, Talacogon.	1,593	10			
Distrito de Cantilan y Mision de San Juan
	Lutao, Hingoog, Cantilan, Tago, Tandac, Lianga y la Mision de San Juan.	1,155				
Distrito de Bislic y Mision de Caraga
	Jinatuan, Bislic, Catel, Bagangan y la Mision de Caraga.	955				
TOTAL		6,178	35			

Felipe Bravo Census Demographics (Cavite, 1818)
Province	Pueblo	Native Families	Spanish Filipino Families	Lacandula Families	Negro Filipino families	Morenos	Chinese Filipino families
Cavite	Plaza y puerto de Cavite.	221	153			5	100
	San Roque.	3,906	443			3	35
	Cavite viejo.	1,855	55				4
	Bacood ó Bacor.	1,729	19				4
	San Francisco de Malabon.	1,510	69				3
	Santa Cruz de Malabon.	2,090	3			1	2
	Pueblo y Hacienda de Nait.	942	3			4	2
	Marigondon.	2,043					3
	Indan.	2,759	36				2
	Silang.	2,255	6			1	4
	Imus.	2,015	125				5
TOTAL		21,325	912			14	164

Felipe Bravo Census Demographics (Cebu, 1818)
Province	Pueblo	Native Families	Spanish Filipino Families	Lacandula Families	Negro Filipino families	Chinese Filipino families
Isla de Cebu
Cebu	Cabecera, El Sto. Nombre de Jesus.	868	255			
	Parian, Yutaos y Sogod con la visita de este, Simugui.	1,795	109			
	San Nicolás y sus visits Talisay, Lipata, Tansan, y Pitao.	2,420				
	Opon y Talamban.	2,850				
	Mandave ó Mandaui.	2,729	20			
	Danao y Catmon.	2,656	57			
	Barili y sus visitas Duman, Jod, Malhual, Coston, Badian y Taiuran.	1,943	14			
	Samboan y sus visitas Jiratilan, Malabuyot, y Taburan.	2,496	69			
	Bolojon y sus visitas Tayon, Calob, Mambuji y Yunan.	2,420				
	Dalaguete.	2,556				
	Argao y Carcar.	3,250				
Isla de Bantayan
	Bantayan y sus visitas Octon y Davis, Daan, Bantayan y sus visits Sogod y Cavit.	2,169	75			
Isla de Siquijor
	Siquijor y su visita Canoan.	2,450	46			
Isla de Bohol
	Inabangan y sus visitas Pampan, Corte, Taoran, Canogon, Tubigon, Ipil, Talibon, Tabigui, Inbay, y Cabulao.	1,815	41			
	Gindulman y sus visitas Quimale y Cugton.	1,500	6			
	Jagna.	3,255				
	Dimiao.	2,016				
	Loay.	1,614	5			
	Lobog y su anejo S. Isidro.	3,852				
	Baclayon.	3,549	5			
	Tagbilaran.	2,370	2			
	Pimin-vitan.	1,414				
	Malabohoo.	2,269				
	Loon y su visita Catarbacan.	1,990				
	Calape y sus visitas Bintig y Mondoog.	1,932				
Isla de Davis
	Davis.	2,055	9			
	Panglao.	1,350				
Isla de Camotes
	Poro y sus visitas (administración de Mandave).					
TOTAL		60,305	638			

Felipe Bravo Census Demographics (Ilocos Norte, 1818)
Province	Pueblo	Native Families	Spanish Filipino Families	Lacandula Families	Negro Filipino families	Chinese Filipino families
Ilocos Norte	Bangui.	1,449	5			
	Nagpartian.	423				
	Pasuquin.	1,530				
	Bacarra.	4,901				
	Vintar.	2,064				
	Sarrat ó San Miguel de Cuning.	2,755				
	Pigdig y su visita Santiago.	4,015				
	Dingras.	4,559				
	Laoag.	12,055				
	San Nicolás.	3,498				
	Batac.	7,026				
	Paoay.	7,447				
	Badoc.	3,356				
TOTAL		55,078	5			

Felipe Bravo Census Demographics (Ilocos Sur, 1818)
Province	Pueblo	Native Families	Spanish Filipino Families	Lacandula Families	Negro Filipino families	Chinese Filipino families
Ilocos Sur	Sinait.	2,625				
	Cabugao.	3,595				
	Lapoc.	1,791				
	Masingal.	2,740				
	Bantay y su visita San Ildefonso.	5,535				
	Santo Domingo.	2,912	36			
	San Vicente Ferrer.	2,113	10			
	Santa Catalina.	4,292				
	Vigan.	6,849	421			14
	Santa Catalina V. y M.	1,750				
	Narvacan.	4,185				
	Santa Maria.	2,985				
	San Esteban.	819				
	Santiago.	1,023				
	Candong.	5,709				
	Santa Lucia y su visita Santa Cruz con la mision de Ronda.	3,690				
	Tagudin y Ous.	2,620				
	Mision llamada Sevilla.					
	Mision de Argaguinan.					
	Bangas y sus misiones.	2,582				
	Villa-Cruz y San Rafael.					
	Namacpacan.	2,564				
	Balaoan.	2,703				
Distrito del Abra
	Tayum en el Abra.	1,307	4			
	Bangued en idem.	1,836	9			
TOTAL		61,397	530			14

Felipe Bravo Census Demographics (Iloilo, 1818)
Province	Pueblo	Native Families	Spanish Filipino Families	Lacandula Families	Negro Filipino families	Chinese Filipino families
Iloilo	Iloilo (cabecera) y Guimaras.	1,594	103			
	Molo.	3,457	23			
	Mandurrio.	5,966				
	Barotac, Asuy y Batag.	1,200				
	Ooton.	5,395				
	Tigbauan.	3,248				
	Guimbal y Tabungan.	4,209				
	Miagao.	4,096				
	San Joaquin.	1,180				
	Igbaras.	3,329				
	Camando.	1,974				
	Alimodian y San Miguel.	4,230				
	Ma-asin.	2,880				
	Cabatuan.	6,470				
	Xaro.	6,871				
	Santa Bárbara.	3,600				
	Janiuay.	4,158				
	Lambuso.	1,040				
	Calinog.	960				
	Pasi y Abaca.	2,637				
	Laglag y Diale.	2,252				
	Pototan.	3,000				
	Dumangas, Anilao, Banate y Barotac.	3,200				
TOTALS		77,862	126			

Felipe Bravo Census Demographics (Laguna, 1818)
Province	Pueblo	Native Families	Spanish Filipino Families	Lacandula Families	Negro Filipino families	Morenos	Chinese Filipino families
Laguna	Pagsanjan, cabecera.	4,785	7				
	Lumban.	1,983					
	Paete.	1,088					
	Longos con su anejo San Antonio del Monte.	944					
	Paquil.	628					
	Panguil.	1,030					
	Siniloan.	1,911					
	Mavitac.	525					
	Santa Maria Caboan.	257					
	Cavioli.	854					
	Majayjay.	4,948					
	Lilio.	2,168					
	Nagcarlan.	2,557					
	Santa Cruz.	2,528					
	Bay.	668					
	Pueblo y hacienda de Calauang.	610	2				
	Pila.	1,117	3				
	Los Baños.	460					5
	Calamba.	959	4				15
	Cabuyao.	1,755			1		14
	Santa Rosa.	1,760					9
	Biñan.	2,598	8		2	2	
	San Pedro Tunasau.	1,112	2			1	
	Pililla.	1,096					
	Tanay.	1,352					
	Binangonan de Bay.	1,234					
	Moron.	1,747					
	Baras.	486	3				
	Pueblo y hacienda de Angono.	513	2		2	3	
TOTAL		40,239	34		5	6	41

Felipe Bravo Census Demographics (Leyte, 1818)
Province	Pueblo	Native Families	Spanish Filipino Families	Lacandula Families	Negro Filipino families	Chinese Filipino families
Leyte	Taclovan (cabecera) y Palo.	2,290	11			
	Tanauan.	2,155	29			
	Dulag y Abuyog.	2,229	14			
	Barayuen, Haro y Alang-alang.	864				
	Barugo y San Miguel.	626				
	Carigara y su visita Leyte.	2,253				
	Palompon, Ogmug y Baybay.	826				
	Hilongos, Bato, Matalom, y Cajanguaan.	1,231	2			
	Indan, Dagami, e Isla de Panamao.	1,978				
Islas de Biliran y Maripipi
	Biliran, Isla de Maripipi, y Maripipi.	538				
Isla de Panahon y Costa Sur
	Isla de Panahon, Ma-asin, Sogod, Cabalian, y Liloan.	1,450				
TOTALES		16,244	56			

Felipe Bravo Census Demographics (Mariana Islands, 1818)
Provinces	Pueblos	Native Citizens	Spanish Citizen
Marianas Islands	(Across the Province in General)	7,555	160

Felipe Bravo Census Demographics (Mindoro, 1818)
Province	Pueblo	Number of Native Families	Number of Spanish Filipino Families	Lacandula Families	Negro Filipino families	Morenos	Chinese Filipino families
Mindoro	Calapan (cabecera) y sus anejos Baco, Sabuan, Abra de Ilog y Dongon.	970	8				
	Naujan y sus anejos Pola, Pinamalayan, Mamalay, Manaol, Bulalacao, Bongabon, Manjao, Manguirin y la Isla de Ilin.	924	6				
Isla de Marinduque
	Santa Cruz de Napo.	1,600	1				
	Boac.	1,908	31		4		
	Gazan.	316	1		1		
Isla de Luban
	Luban.	1,699					
TOTAL		7,455	47		5		

Felipe Bravo Census Demographics (Misamis)
Province	Pueblo	Number of Native Families	Number of Spanish Filipino Families	Lacandula Families	Negro Filipino families	Morenos	Chinese Filipino families
Partido de Misamis
Misamis	Plaza y presidio de Misamis, y su anejo Loculan.	334					
	Presidio de Iligan, con su anejo Initao.	169					
Partido de Dapitan
	Dapitan, y su visita San Lorenzo de Ilaya.	666	2				
	Lobungan, y sus visitas Dipolog, Piao, Dohinog, y Dicayo.	701					
Partido de Cagayan
	Cagayan, y sus visitas Iponau, Mulingan, Agusan, Cagaloan, Lasaan, Balingasay, Salay, Quinoquitan ó Bacay, Mubijut, y la Mision de Pinangudan.	3,177	1				
Isla de Camiguin (Partido de Catarman)
	Catarman, y sus visitas Mambujao, Guinsiliban, y Sagay.	1,693	35				
TOTAL		6,740	38				

Felipe Bravo Census Demographics (Samar, 1818)
Provinces	Pueblos	Native Families	Spanish Filipino Families	Negrito Families	Chinese Filipino Families
Samar	Samar island, in general.	16,671	174		

Felipe Bravo Census Demographics (Zamboanga, 1818)
Provinces	Pueblos	Native Citizens	Spanish Filipino Soldiers	Kapampangan Soldiers	Spanish and Mexican Citizens
Zamboanga	Zamboanga-province and peninsula .	8,640	300	100	A very large but unknown amount of the civilian population, they are mostly employed in the navy and shipping.

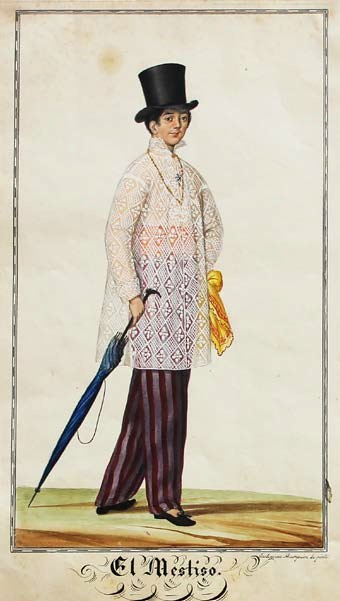
El Mestiso by Justiniano Asuncion

In the 1860s to 1890s, in the urban areas of the Philippines, especially at Manila, according to burial statistics, as much as 3.3% of the population were pure European Spaniards and the pure Chinese were as high as 9.9%. The Spanish Filipino and Chinese Filipino Mestizo populations also fluctuated. Eventually, many families belonging to the non-native categories from centuries ago beyond the late 19th century diminished because their descendants intermarried enough and were assimilated into and chose to self-identify as Filipinos while forgetting their ancestor's roots since during the Philippine Revolution to modern times, the term "Filipino" was expanded to include everyone born in the Philippines coming from any race, as per the Philippine nationality law. That would explain the abrupt drop of otherwise high Chinese, Spanish and mestizo, percentages across the country by the time of the first American census in 1903. By the 20th century, the remaining ethnic Spaniards and ethnic Chinese, replenished by further Chinese migrants in the 20th century, now later came to compose the modern Spanish Filipino community and Chinese Filipino community respectively, where families of such background contribute a significant share of the Philippine economy today, where most in the current list of the Philippines' richest each year comprise billionaires of either Chinese Filipino background or the old elite families of Spanish Filipino background.

=== Late modern ===
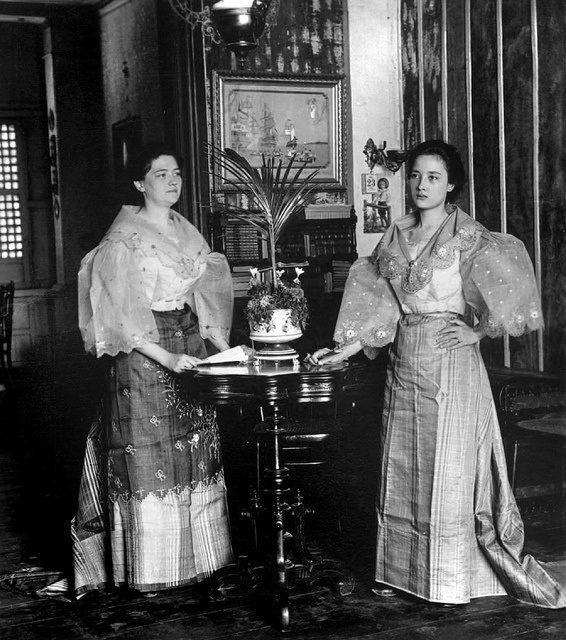
Filipina women in Filipiniana dress, (Manila, 1899).

After the defeat of Spain during the Spanish–American War in 1898, Filipino general, Emilio Aguinaldo declared independence on June 12 while General Wesley Merritt became the first American governor of the Philippines. On December 10, 1898, the Treaty of Paris formally ended the war, with Spain ceding the Philippines and other territories to the United States in exchange for $20 million.

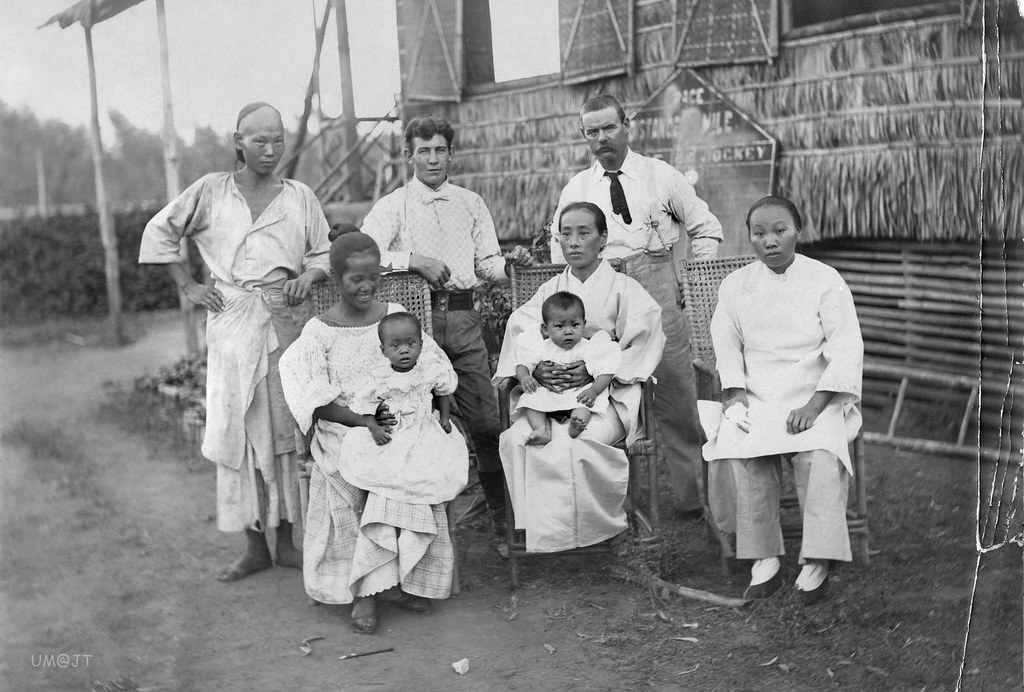
A native Filipina with Chinese, American / European and Japanese settlers in the Philippines, 1900

The Philippine–American War resulted in the deaths of at least 200,000 Filipino civilians. Some estimates for total civilian dead reach up to 1,000,000. After the Philippine–American War, the United States civil governance was established in 1901, with William Howard Taft as the first American Governor-General. A number of Americans settled in the islands and thousands of interracial marriages between Americans and Filipinos have taken place since then. Owing to the strategic location of the Philippines, as many as 21 bases and 100,000 military personnel were stationed there since the United States first colonized the islands in 1898. These bases were decommissioned in 1992 after the end of the Cold War, but left behind thousands of Amerasian children. The country gained independence from the United States in 1946. The Pearl S. Buck International Foundation estimates there are 52,000 Amerasians scattered throughout the Philippines. However, according to the center of Amerasian Research, there might be as many as 250,000 Amerasians scattered across the cities of Clark, Angeles City, Manila, and Olongapo. In addition, numerous Filipino men enlisted in the US Navy and made careers in it, often settling with their families in the United States. Some of their second- or third-generation families returned to the country.

Philippine nationality law is currently based upon the principle of jus sanguinis and, therefore, descent from a parent who is a citizen of the Republic of the Philippines is the primary method of acquiring national citizenship. Birth in the Philippines to foreign parents does not in itself confer Philippine citizenship, although RA9139, the Administrative Naturalization Law of 2000, does provide a path for administrative naturalization of certain aliens born in the Philippines. Since many of the above historical groups came to the Philippines before its establishment as an independent state, many have also gained citizenship before the founding of either the First Philippines Republic or Third Republic of the Philippines. For example, many Cold-War-era Chinese migrants who had relatives in the Philippines attain Filipino citizenship for their children through marriage with Chinese Filipino families that trace back to either the late Spanish Era or American Colonial Era. Likewise, many other modern expatriates from various countries, such as the US, often come to the Philippines to marry with a Filipino citizen, ensuring their future children attain Filipino citizenship and their Filipino spouses ensure property ownership.

=== Social classifications ===
During the Spanish period, Spaniards from Spain and Hispanic America mainly referred to Spaniards born in the Philippines (Spanish Filipinos) in Spanish: "Filipino/s" (m) or "Filipina/s" (f) in relation to those born in Hispanic America called in Spanish: "Americano/s" (m) / "Americana/s" (f) or "Criollo/s", whereas the Spaniards born in the Philippines themselves called the Spaniards from Spain as "Peninsular/es" with themselves also referred to as "Insular/es". Meanwhile, the caste system hierarchy and taxation system during the Spanish Times dictated that those of mixed descent were known as "Mestizo/s" (m) / "Mestiza/s" (f), specifically those of mixed Spanish and native Filipino descent were known as "Mestizo/s de Español" (Spanish Mestizos), whereas those of mixed Chinese and native Filipino descent were known as "Mestizo/s de Sangley" (Chinese Mestizos) and the mix of all of the above or a mix of Spanish and Chinese were known as "Tornatrás". Meanwhile, the ethnic Chinese migrants (Chinese Filipinos) were historically referred to as "Sangley/es" (from Hokkien Chinese: 生理; Pe̍h-ōe-jī: Sng-lí; lit. 'business'), while the natives of the Philippine islands were usually known by the generic term "Indio/s" (lit. "Indian, native of the East Indies").

Filipinos of mixed ethnic origins are still referred today as mestizos. However, in common popular parlance, mestizos usually refer to Filipinos mixed with Spanish or any other European ancestry. Filipinos mixed with any other foreign ethnicities are named depending on the non-Filipino part. Historically though, it was the Mestizo de Sangley (Chinese Mestizo) that numbered the most among mestizos, though the Mestizos de Español (Spanish Mestizos) carried more social prestige due to the caste system hierarchy that usually elevated Spanish blood and Christianized natives to the peak, while most descendants of the Mestizo de Sangley (Chinese Mestizo), despite assuming many of the important roles in the economic, social and political life of the nation, would readily assimilate into the fabric of Philippine society. Despite regional, linguistic, and cultural diversity, Filipinos are commonly linked by shared historical experiences, civic traditions, and national institutions that contribute to a collective sense of identity.

Term	Definition
Peninsulares	Person of pure Spanish descent born in Spain ("from the Iberian Peninsula").
Americano	Person of Criollo (pure or almost pure Spanish), Castizo (3/4 Spanish, 1/4 Native American) or Mestizo (1/2 Spanish, 1/2 Native American) descent born in Spanish America ("from the Americas").
Insulares / Criollos / Filipinos	Person of pure Spanish descent born in the Philippines ("from the Philippine Islands").
Mestizo de Español	Person of mixed Spanish and native Austronesian descent.
Tornatrás	Person of mixed Spanish and Chinese descent or mixed Spanish, Chinese and native Austronesian descent.
Mestizo de Sangley	Person of mixed Chinese or Japanese descent with native Austronesian descent.
Mestizo de Bombay	Person of mixed Indian and native Austronesian descent.
Indio (Christianized)	Person of pure native Austronesian descent who was Christianized, usually under the Spanish missionaries of the Catholic Church.
Sangley / Chino (Christianized)	Person of pure Chinese descent who was Christianized, usually by the Spanish missionaries of the Catholic Church.
Sangley / Chino (Unchristianized)	Person of pure Chinese descent who was not Christianized.
Moro	Person of Arab and native Austronesian descent who was Islamized.
Negrito	Person of pure indigenous pre-Austronesian descent, such as a member of the Aeta, Ati, Batak, Mamanwa, etc.

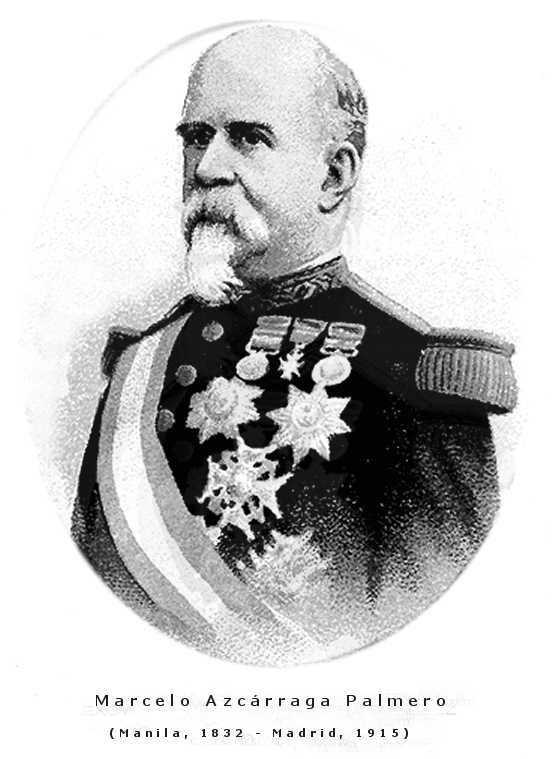
Marcelo Azcárraga Palmero, the only Spanish prime minister of mestizo (Filipino) descent

People classified as 'blancos' (whites) were the insulares or "Filipinos" (a person born in the Philippines of pure Spanish descent), peninsulares (a person born in Spain of pure Spanish descent), Español mestizos (a person born in the Philippines of mixed Austronesian and Spanish ancestry) and tornatrás (a person born in the Philippines of mixed Austronesian, Chinese and Spanish ancestry). Manila was racially segregated, with blancos living in the walled city of Intramuros, un-Christianized sangleys in Parían, Christianized sangleys and mestizos de sangley in Binondo and the rest of the 7,000 islands for the indios, with the exception of Cebu and several other Spanish posts. Only mestizos de sangley were allowed to enter Intramuros to work for whites (including mestizos de español) as servants and various occupations needed for the colony. Indio were native Austronesians, but as a legal classification, Indio were those who embraced Roman Catholicism and Austronesians who lived in proximity to the Spanish colonies.

People who lived outside Manila, Cebu and the major Spanish posts were classified as such: 'Naturales' were Catholic Austronesians of the lowland and coastal towns. The un-Catholic Negritos and Austronesians who lived in the towns were classified as 'salvajes' (savages) or 'infieles' (the unfaithful). 'Remontados' (Spanish for 'situated in the mountains') and 'tulisanes' (bandits) were indigenous Austronesians and Negritos who refused to live in towns and took to the hills, all of whom were considered to live outside the social order as Catholicism was a driving force in Spanish everyday life, as well as determining social class in the territory. People of pure Spanish descent living in the Philippines who were born in Spanish America were classified as 'americanos'. Mestizos and africanos born in Spanish America living in the Philippines kept their legal classification as such and usually came as indentured servants to the 'americanos'. The Philippine-born children of 'americanos' were classified as 'Ins'. The Philippine-born children of mestizos and Africanos from Spanish America were classified based on patrilineal descent.

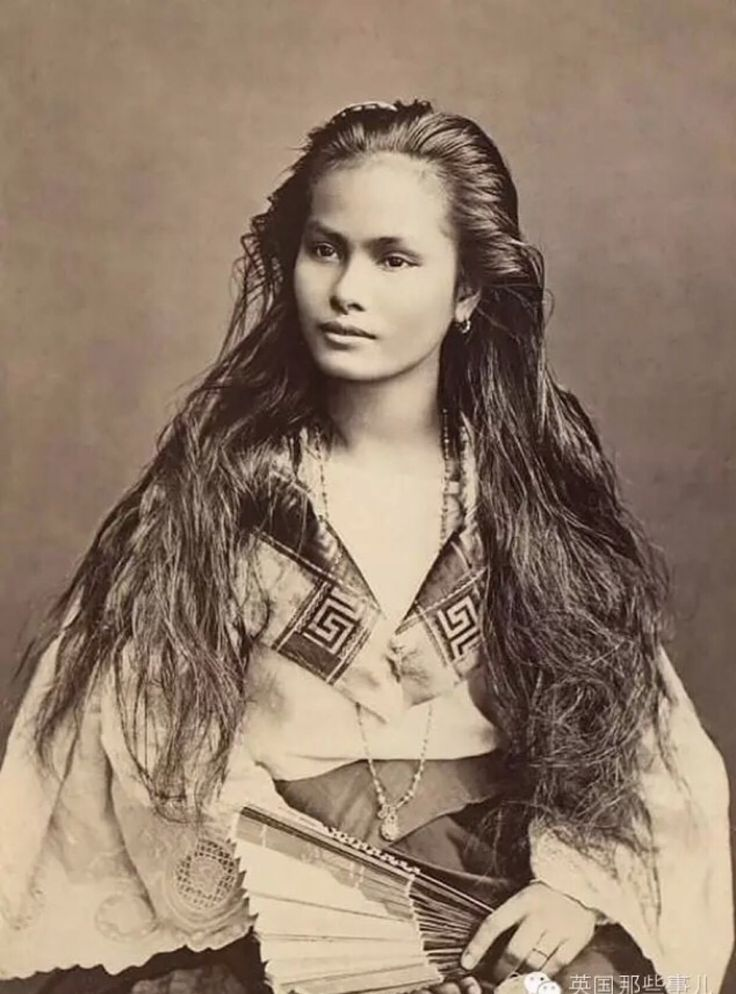
A mestiza de sangley woman in a photograph by Francisco Van Camp, c. 1875

The term negrito was coined by the Spaniards based on their appearance. The word 'negrito' would be misinterpreted and used by future European scholars as an ethnoracial term in and of itself. Both Christianized negritos who lived in the archipelago and un-Christianized negritos who lived in tribes outside were classified as 'negritos'. Christianized negritos who lived in Manila were not allowed to enter Intramuros and lived in areas designated for indios.

A person of mixed Negrito and Austronesian ancestry were classified based on patrilineal descent; the father's ancestry determined a child's legal classification. If the father was 'negrito' and the mother was 'India' (Austronesian), the child was classified as 'negrito'. If the father was 'indio' and the mother was 'negrita', the child was classified as 'indio'. Persons of Negrito descent were viewed as being outside the social order as they usually lived in tribes outside and resisted conversion to Christianity.

This legal system of racial classification based on patrilineal descent had no parallel anywhere in the Spanish-ruled territories in the Americas. In general, a son born of a sangley male and an indio or mestizo de sangley female was classified as mestizo de sangley; all subsequent male descendants were mestizos de sangley regardless of whether they married an India or a mestiza de sangley. A daughter born in such a manner, however, acquired the legal classification of her husband, i.e., she became an India if she married an indio but remained a mestiza de sangley if she married a mestizo de sangley or a sangley. In this way, a chino mestizo male descendant of a paternal sangley ancestor never lost his legal status as a mestizo de sangley no matter how little percentage of Chinese blood he had in his veins or how many generations had passed since his first Chinese ancestor; he was thus a mestizo de sangley in perpetuity.

However, a 'mestiza de sangley' who married a blanco ('Filipino', 'mestizo de español', 'peninsular' or 'americano') kept her status as 'mestiza de sangley'. But her children were classified as tornatrás. An 'India' who married a blanco also kept her status as India, but her children were classified as mestizo de español. A mestiza de español who married another blanco would keep her status as mestiza, but her status will never change from mestiza de español if she married a mestizo de español, Filipino or peninsular. In contrast, a mestizo (de sangley or español) man's status stayed the same regardless of whom he married. If a mestizo (de sangley or español) married a filipina (woman of pure Spanish descent), she would lose her status as a 'filipina' and would acquire the legal status of her husband and become a mestiza de español or sangley. If a 'filipina' married an 'indio', her legal status would change to 'India', despite being of pure Spanish descent.

The de facto social stratification system based on class that continues to this day in the country had its beginnings in the Spanish area with a discriminating caste system.

The Insulares, who already saw their distinct identity from the peninsulares adopted the term Filipino to refer to themselves. And among these Insulares Luis Rodriguez y Varela was the first to use it. The use of the term was later adopted by the Spanish and Chinese mestizos or those born of mixed Chinese-indio or Spanish-indio descent. Late in the 19th century, José Rizal popularized the use of the term Filipino to refer to all those born in the Philippines, including the Indios. When ordered to sign the notification of his death sentence, which described him as a Chinese mestizo, Rizal refused. He went to his death saying that he was indio puro.

After the Philippines' independence from Spain in 1898 and the word Filipino "officially" became a nationality that includes the entire population of the Philippines regardless of racial ancestry, as per the Philippine nationality law and as described by Wenceslao Retana's Diccionario de filipinismos, where he defined Filipinos as follows,

todos los nacidos en Filipinas sin distincion de origen ni de raza.
All those born in the Philippines without distinction of origin or race.

— Wenceslao E. Retaña, Diccionario De Filipinismos: Con La Revisión De Lo Que Al Respecto Lleva Publicado La Real Academia Española

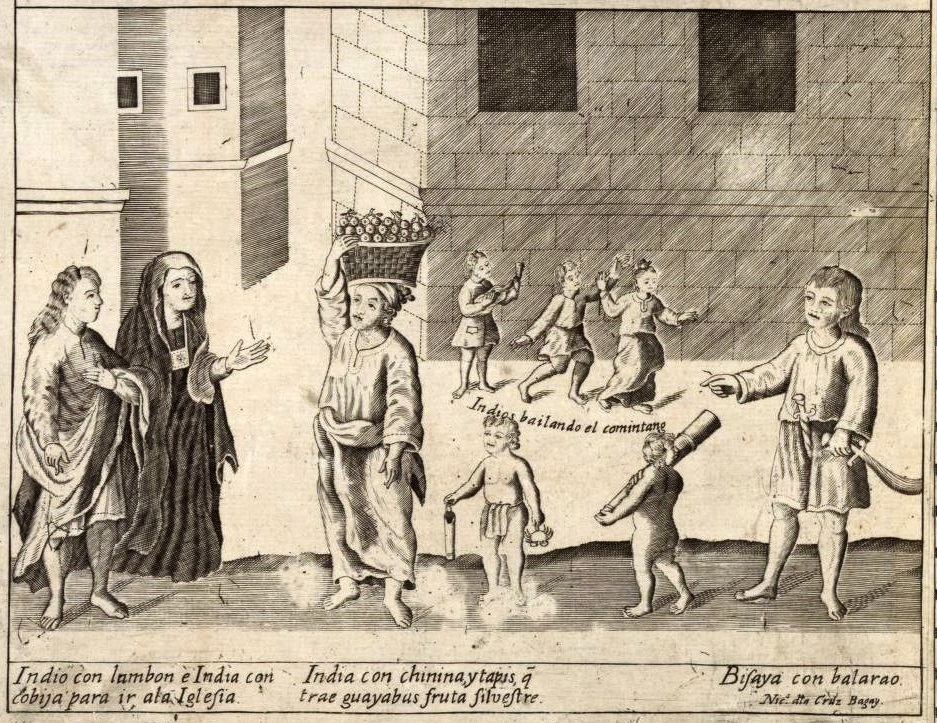
Native Visayan Filipinos as illustrated in the Carta Hydrographica y Chorographica de las Yslas Filipinas (1734)

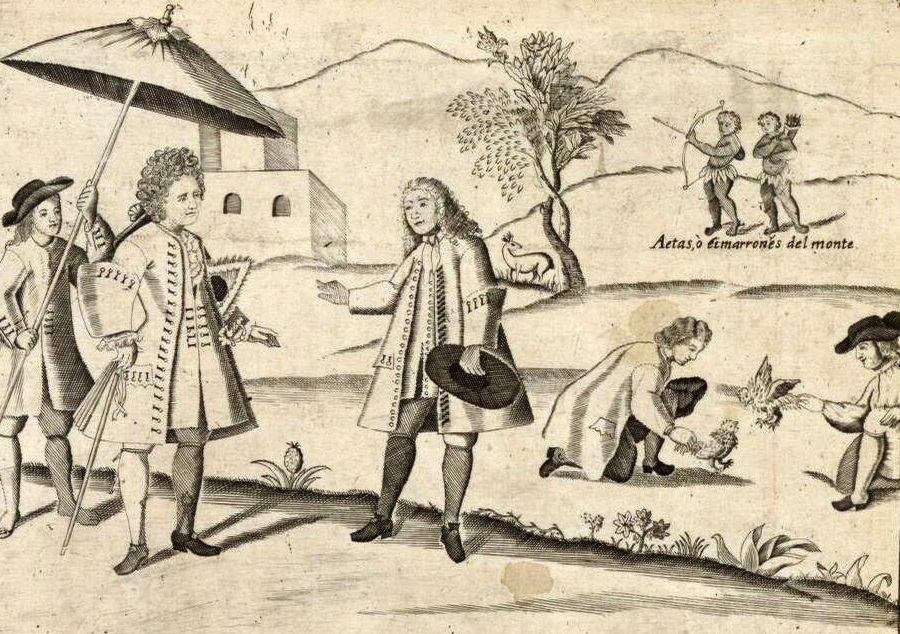
A Spaniard and Criollo talking, while Natives are cockfight. Aetas also in the background. detail from Carta Hydrographica y Chorographica de las Yslas Filipinas(1734).

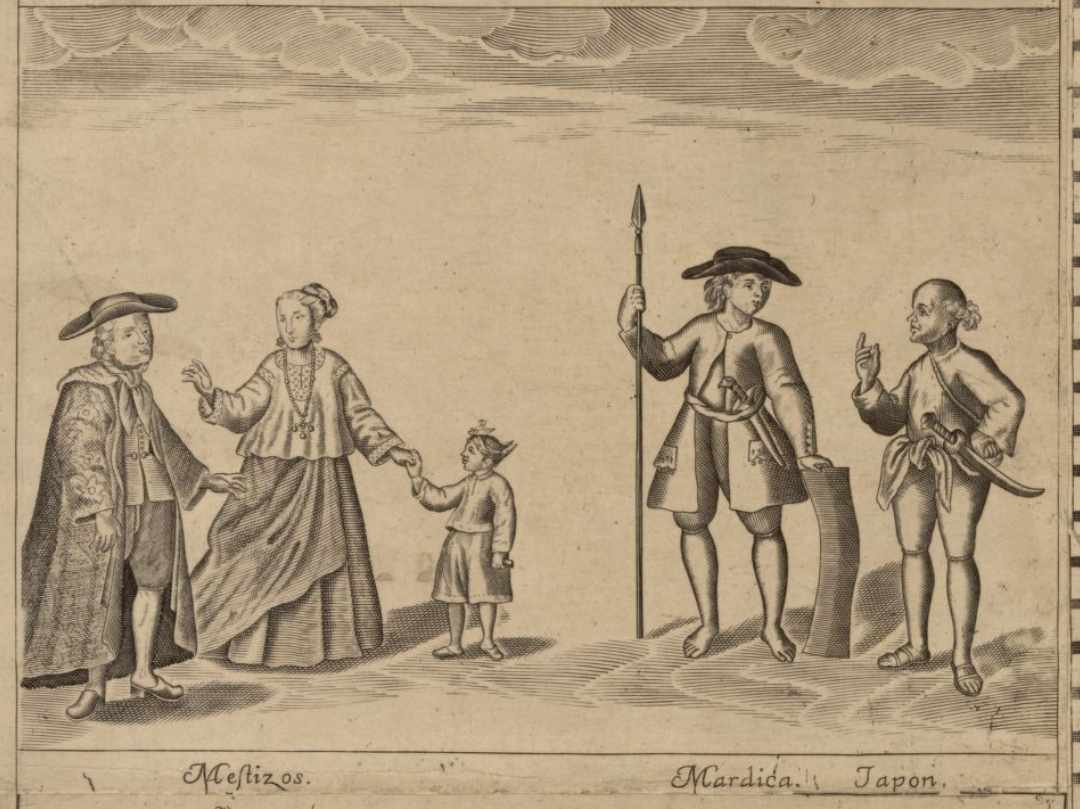
Mestizos (Left), Mardicans and Japanese (Right) inhabitants of the Philippines. from Carta Hydrographica y Chorographica de las Yslas Filipinas(1734)

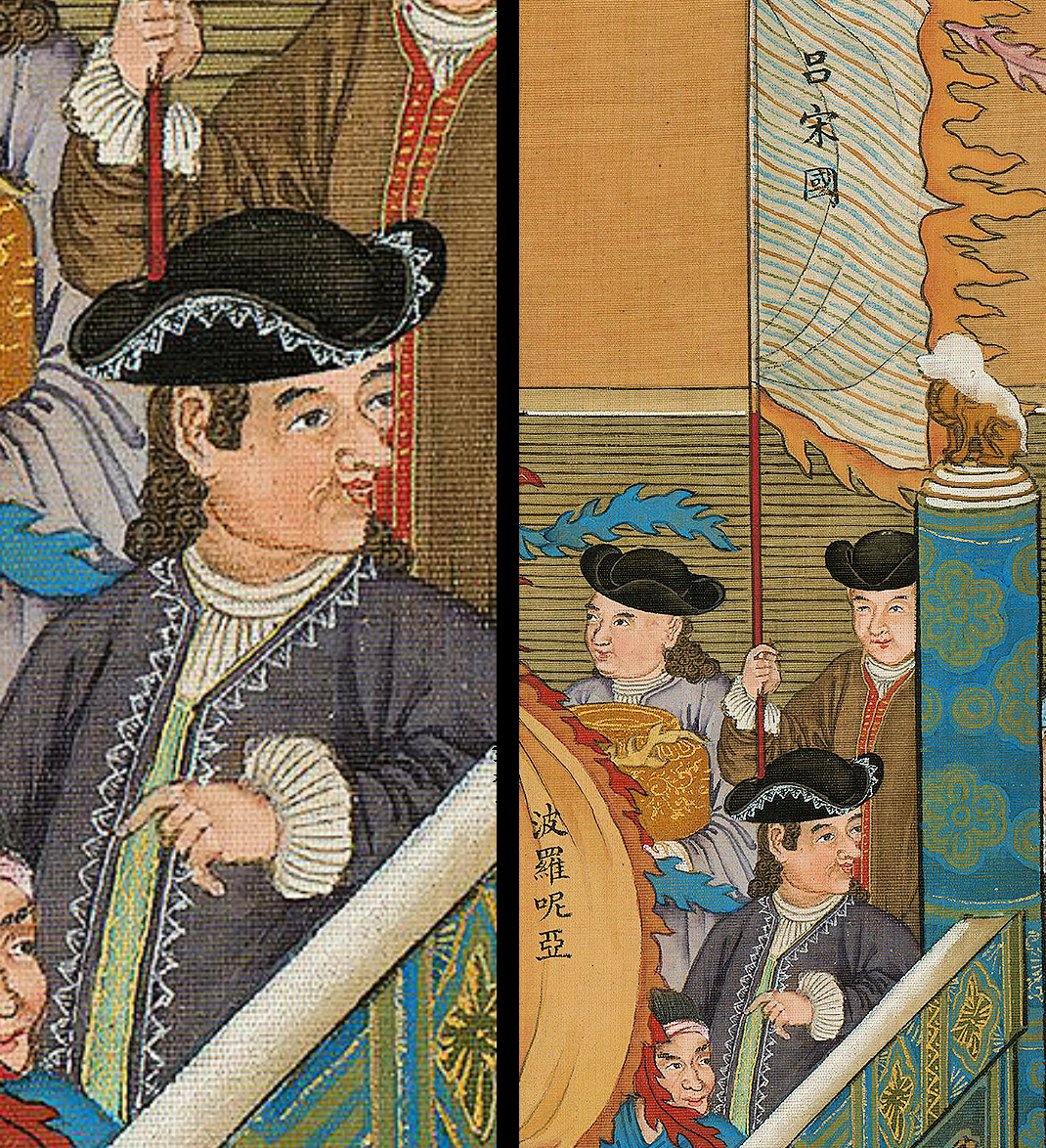
Qing dynasty painting. Depicting Luzon delegates from the late 1750s, visiting the Qianlong Emperor in the Forbidden city in Beijing.

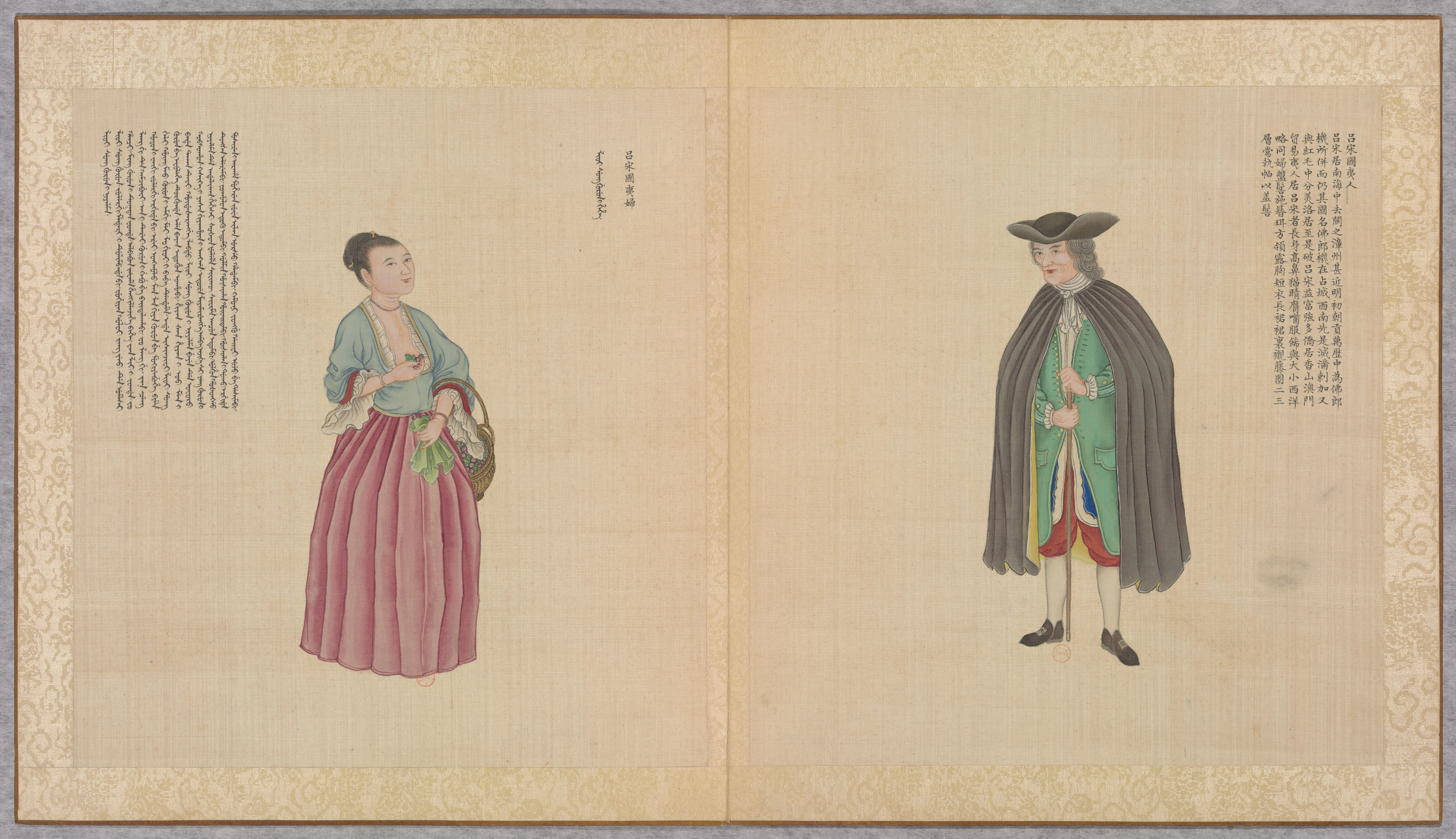
Depiction of the Luzon Filipinos in 1700s from the Chinese book Huang Qing Zhigong Tu 1769. The Chinese called them Lu Song whom they recognized as a prosperous and powerful "kingdom" under the Spanish Empire.

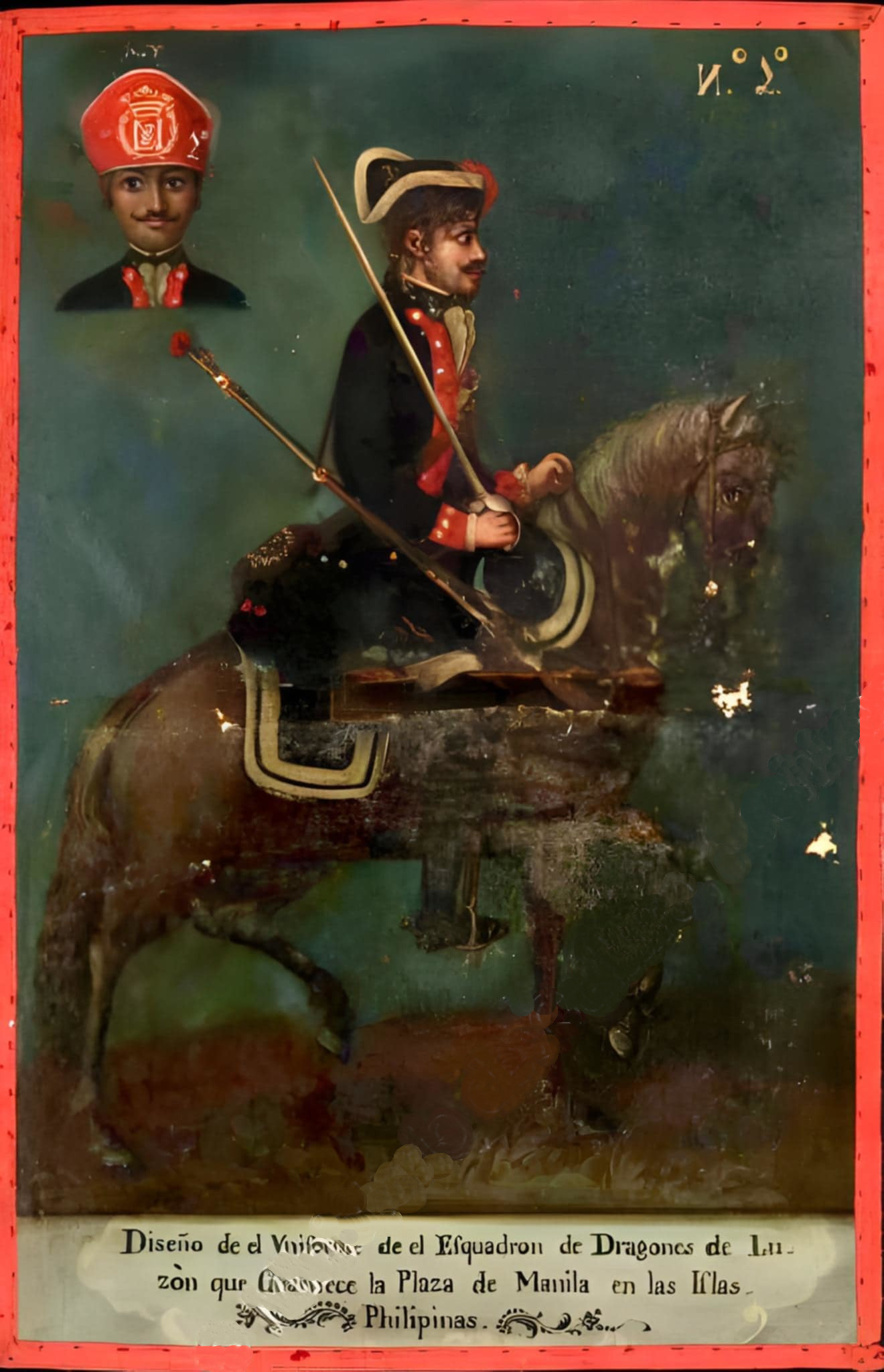
Filipino Dragoon horseback 1786

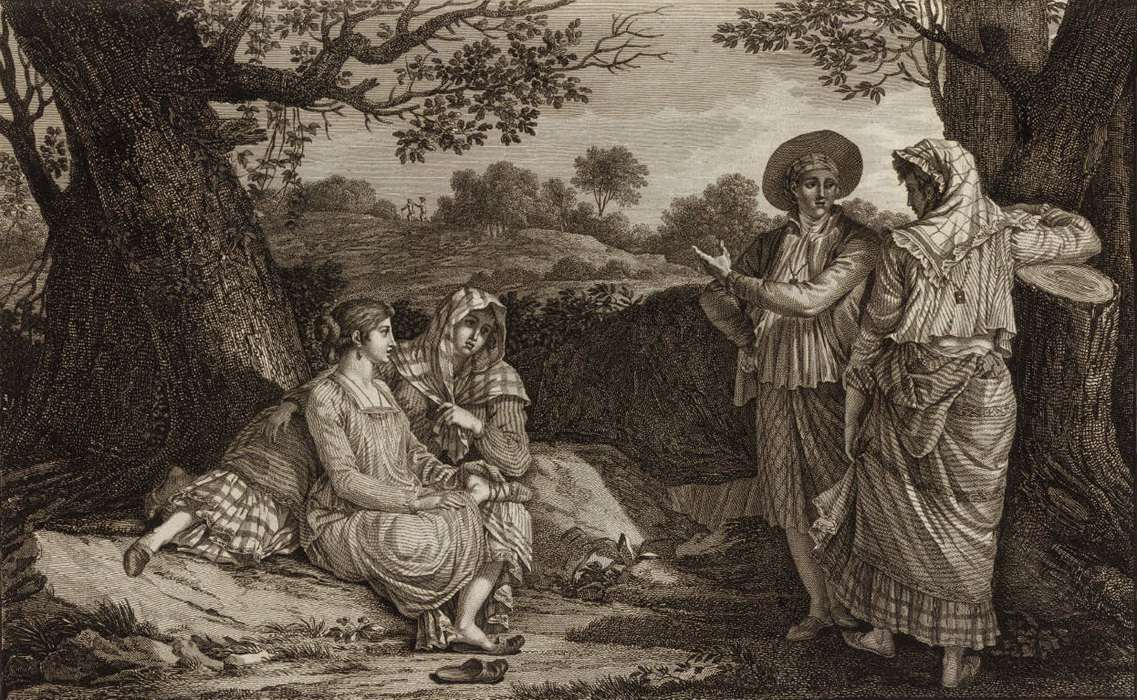
Inhabitants of Manila 1787 by Gaspard Duché de Vancy

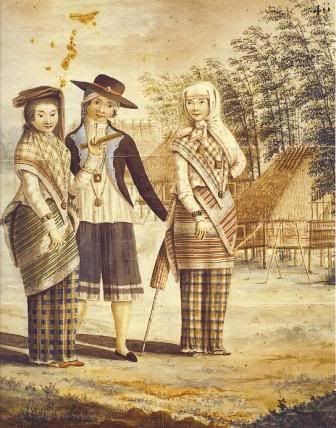
Mestizos of Manila circa 1790s

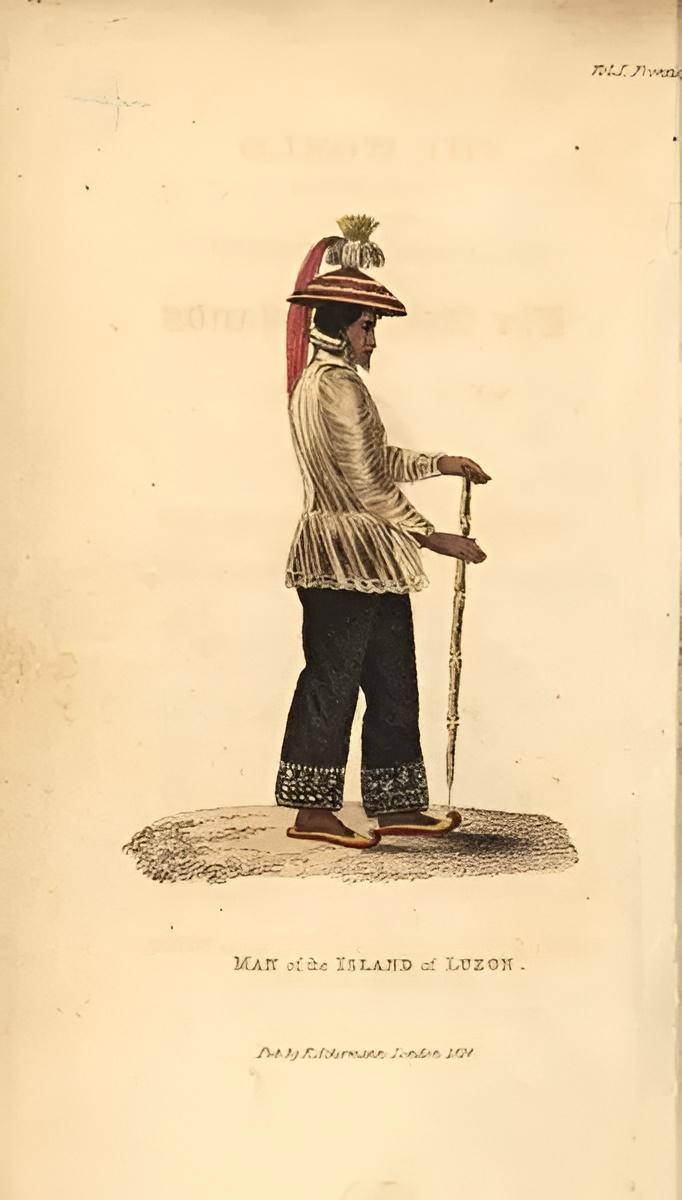
A Filipino in 1820 by John Crawfurd

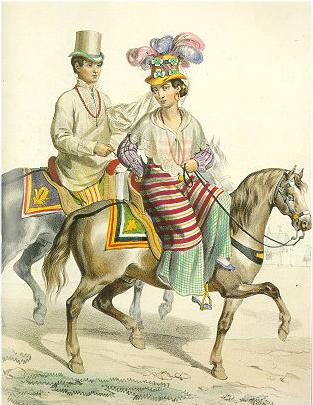
Spanish Mestizo Filipinos by Jean Mallat de Basilan 1800's

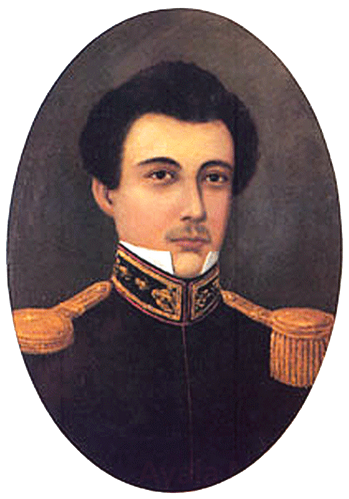
Damián Domingo, A mestizo de Sangley soldier and artist.

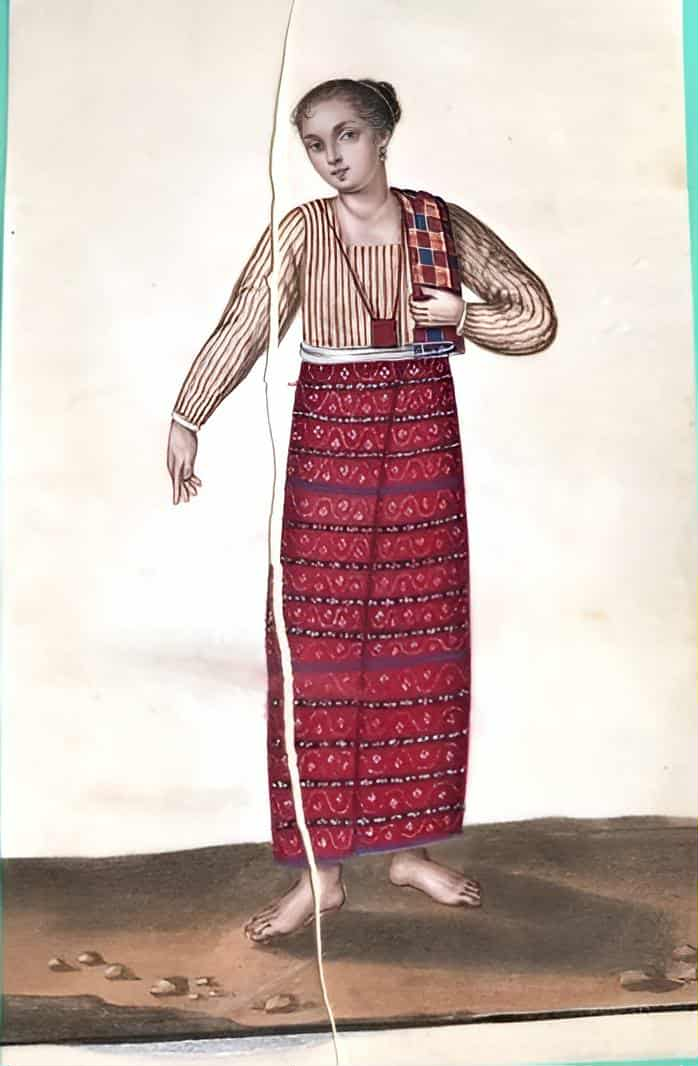
A Visayan native girl by Damian Domingo.

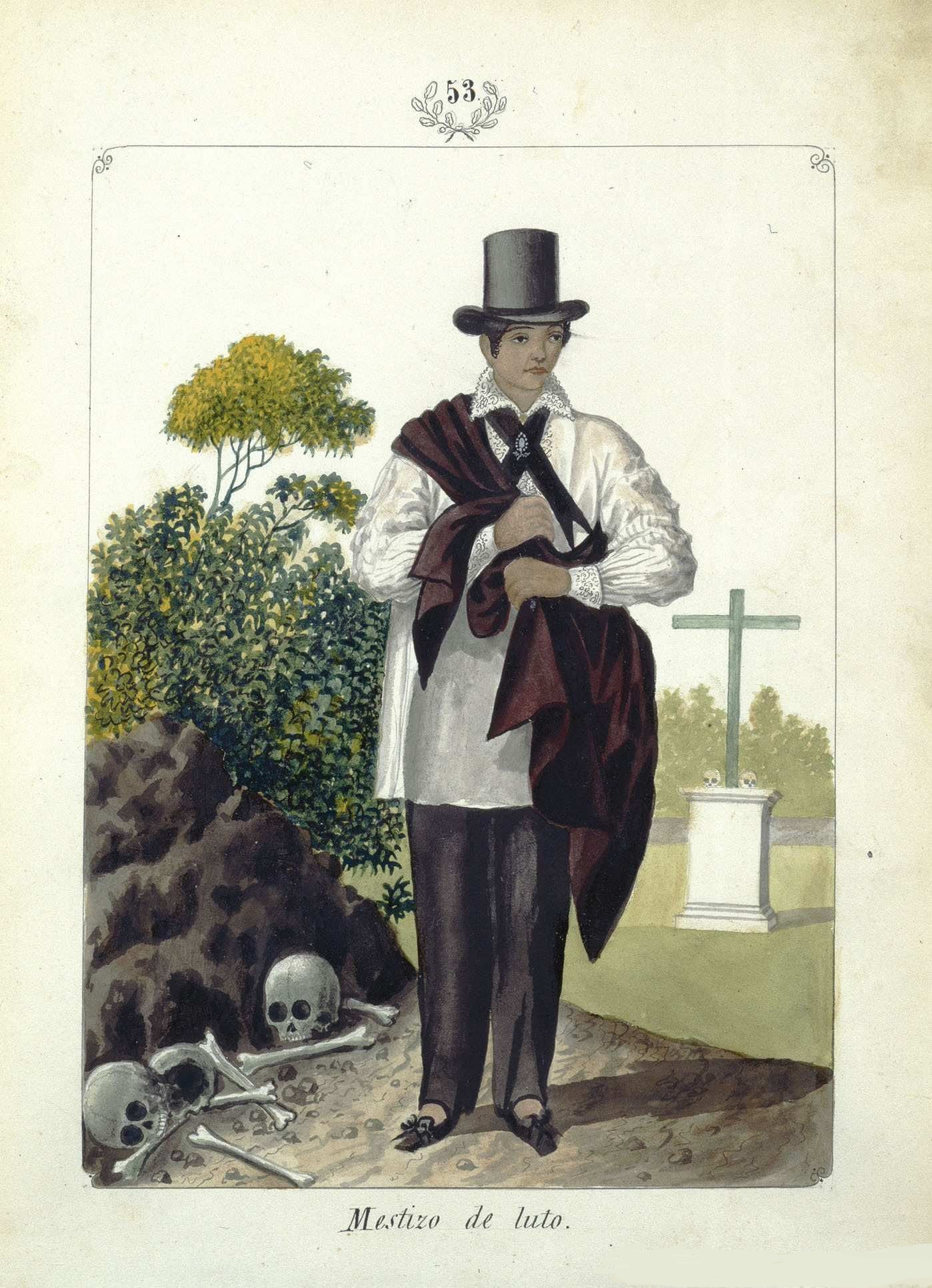
"Mestizo de luto" (A Native Filipino Mestizo) by José Honorato Lozano

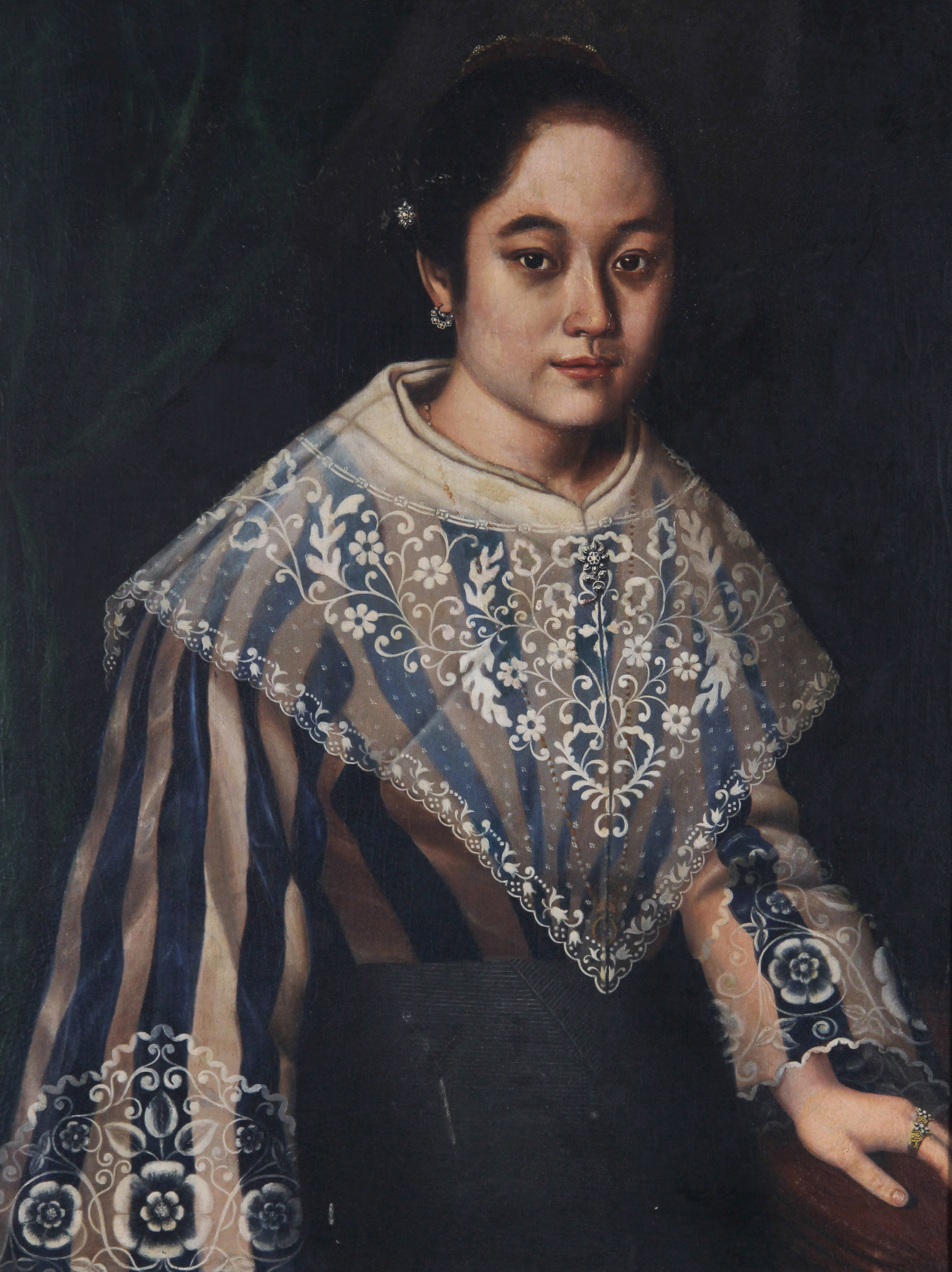
Filomena Asunción de Villafranca by Justiniano Asunción

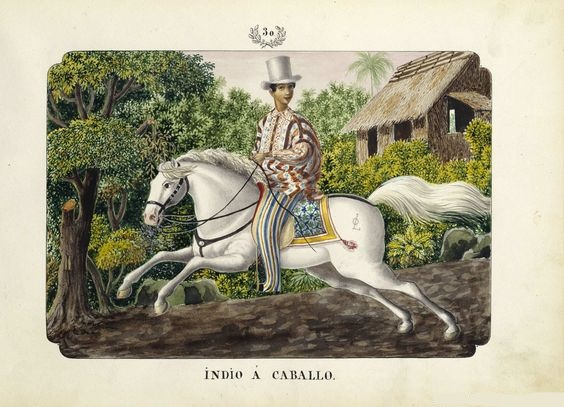
Native riding a horse by José Honorato Lozano

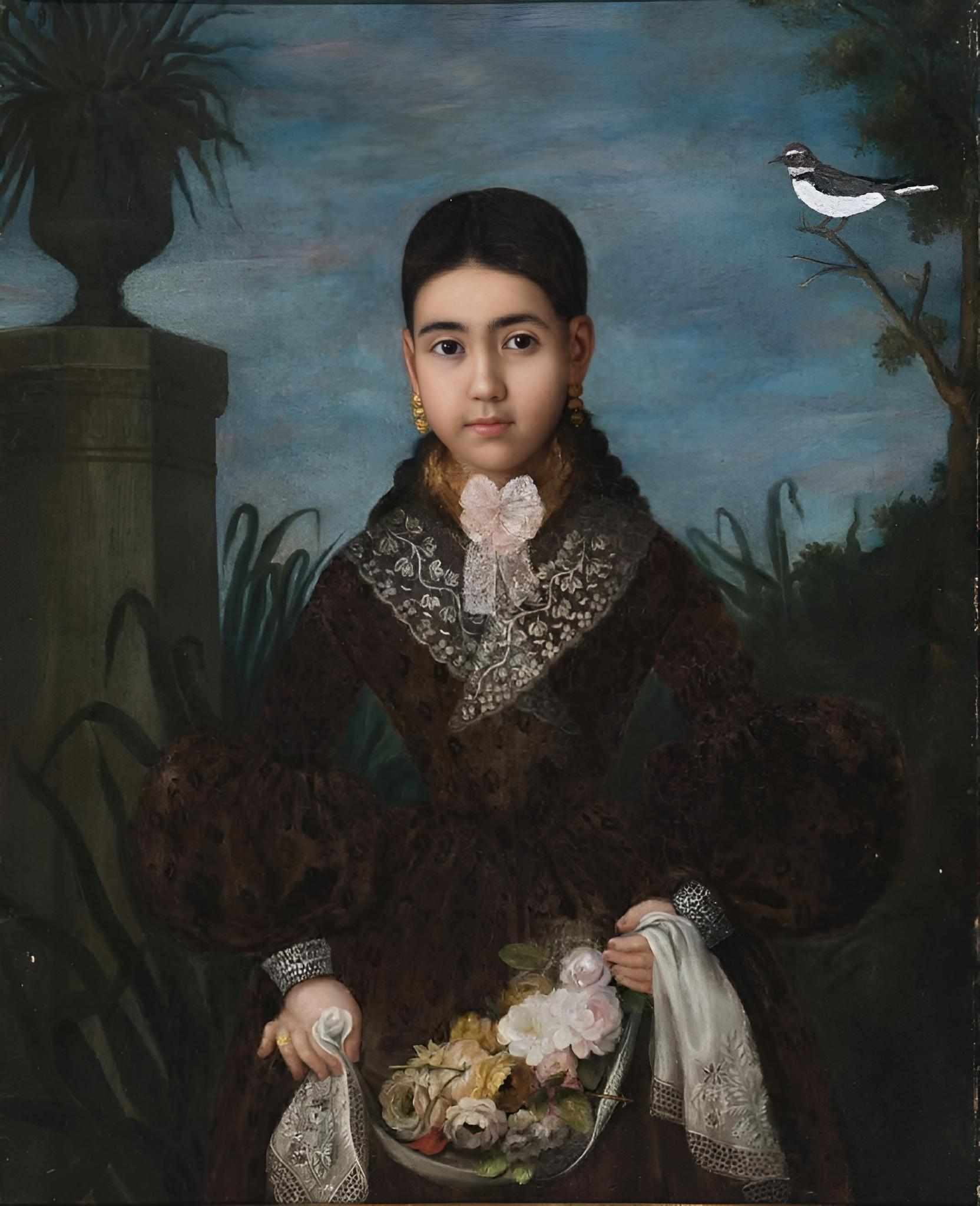
Filipina girl. 19th century

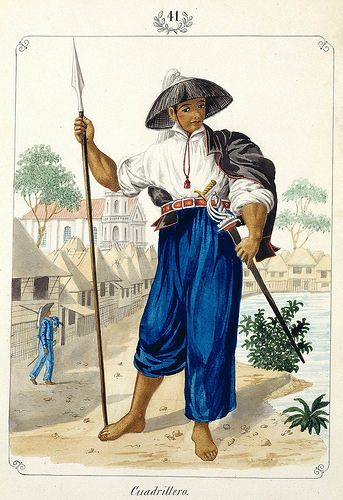
Cuadrillero by José Honorato Lozano

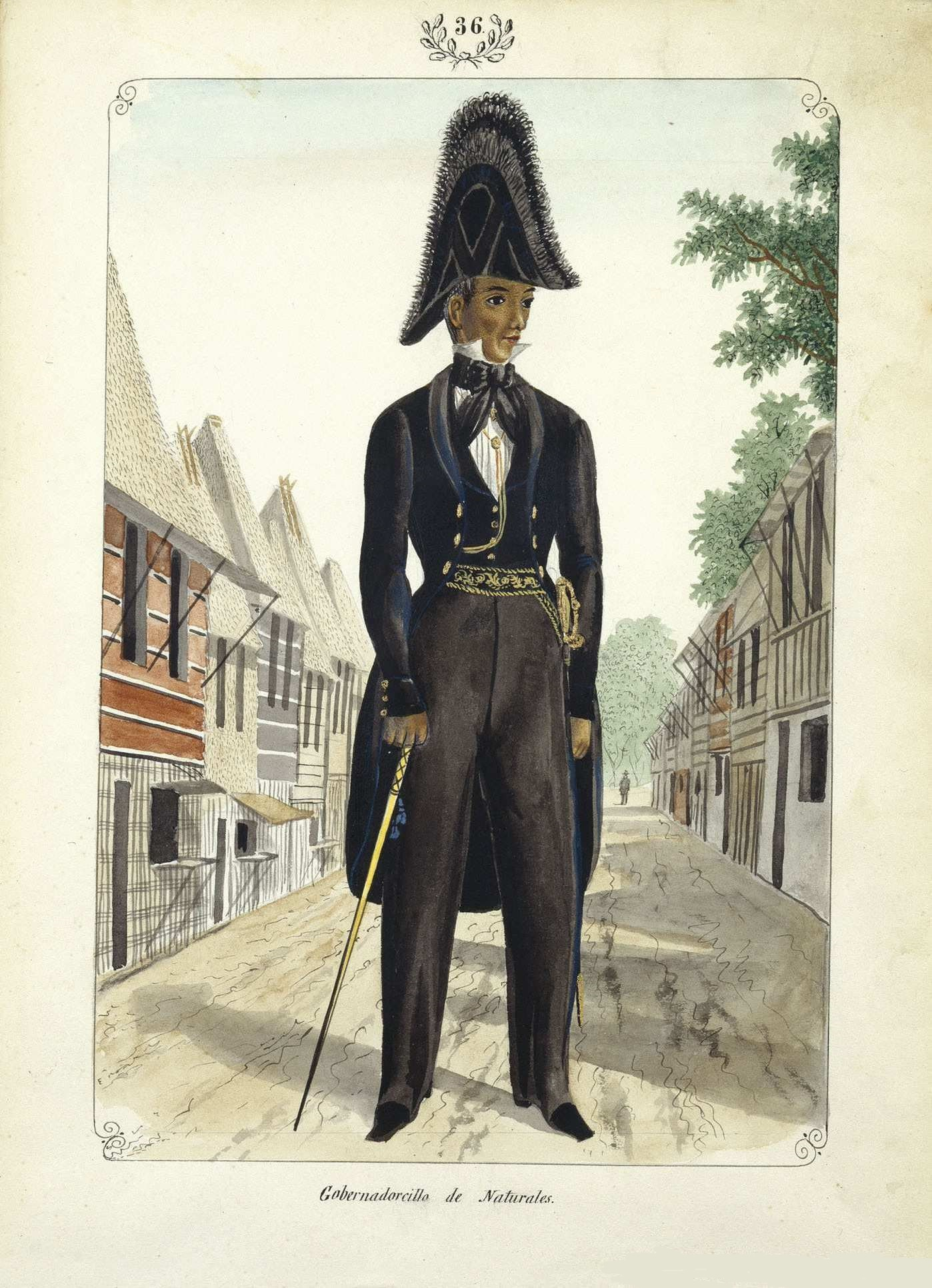
A Gobernadorcillo, mostly of Indio descent. Painting by José Honorato Lozano

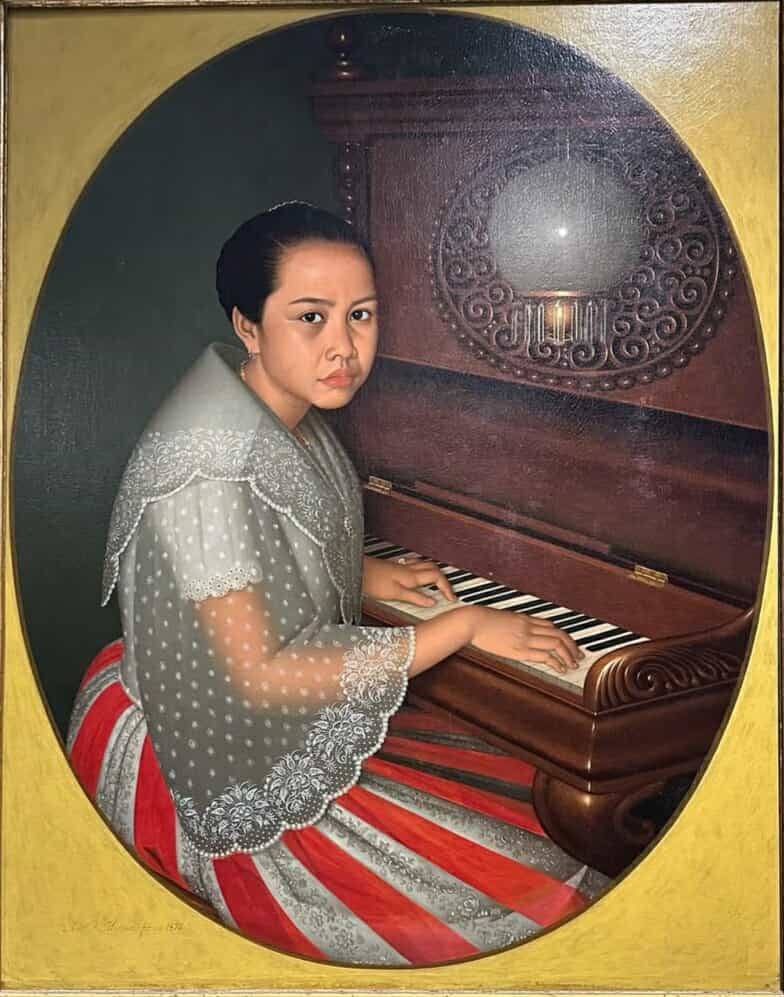
Soledad Francia by Antonio Malantic 1876 Philippines

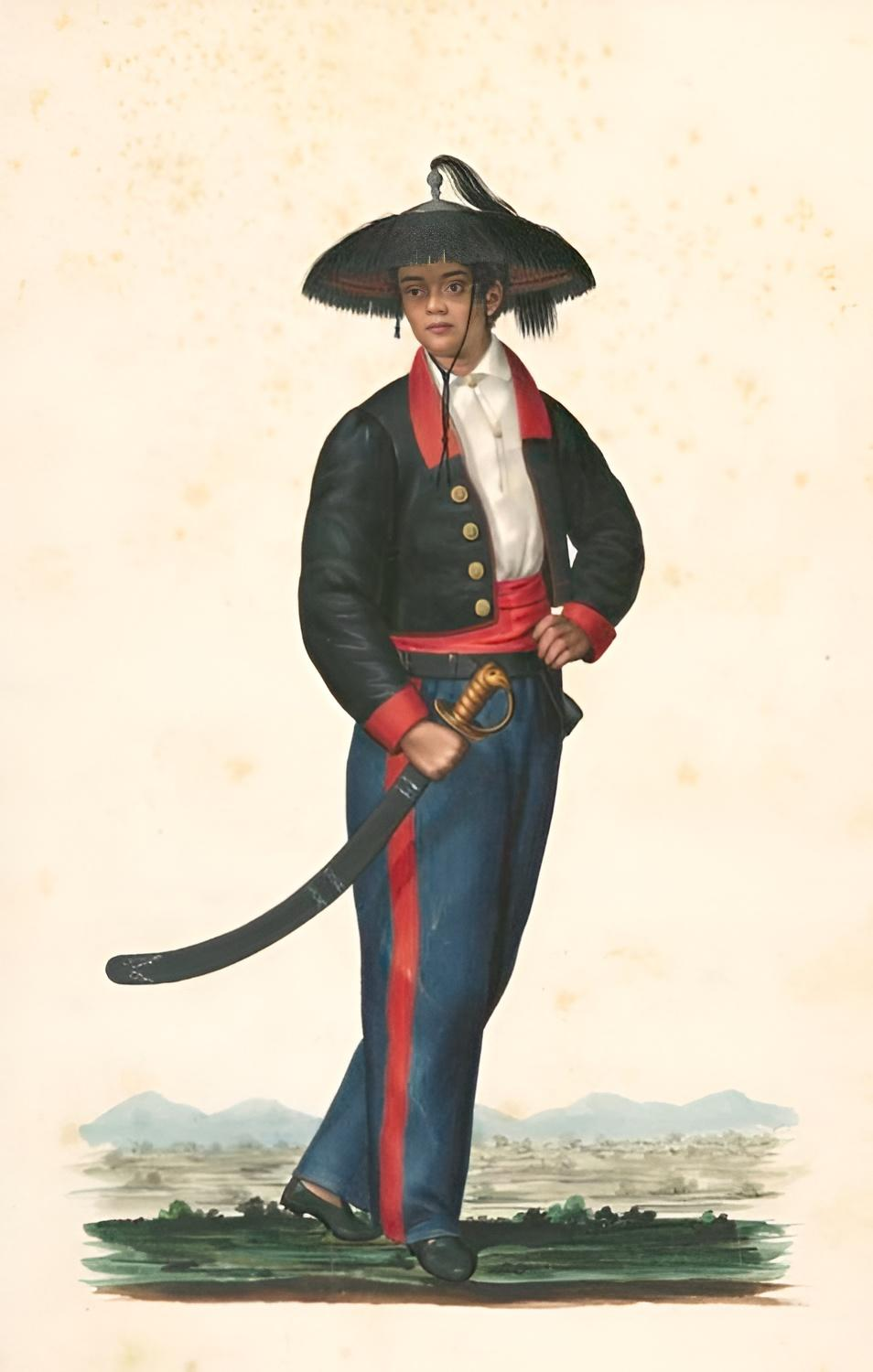
Vine Guard 1841

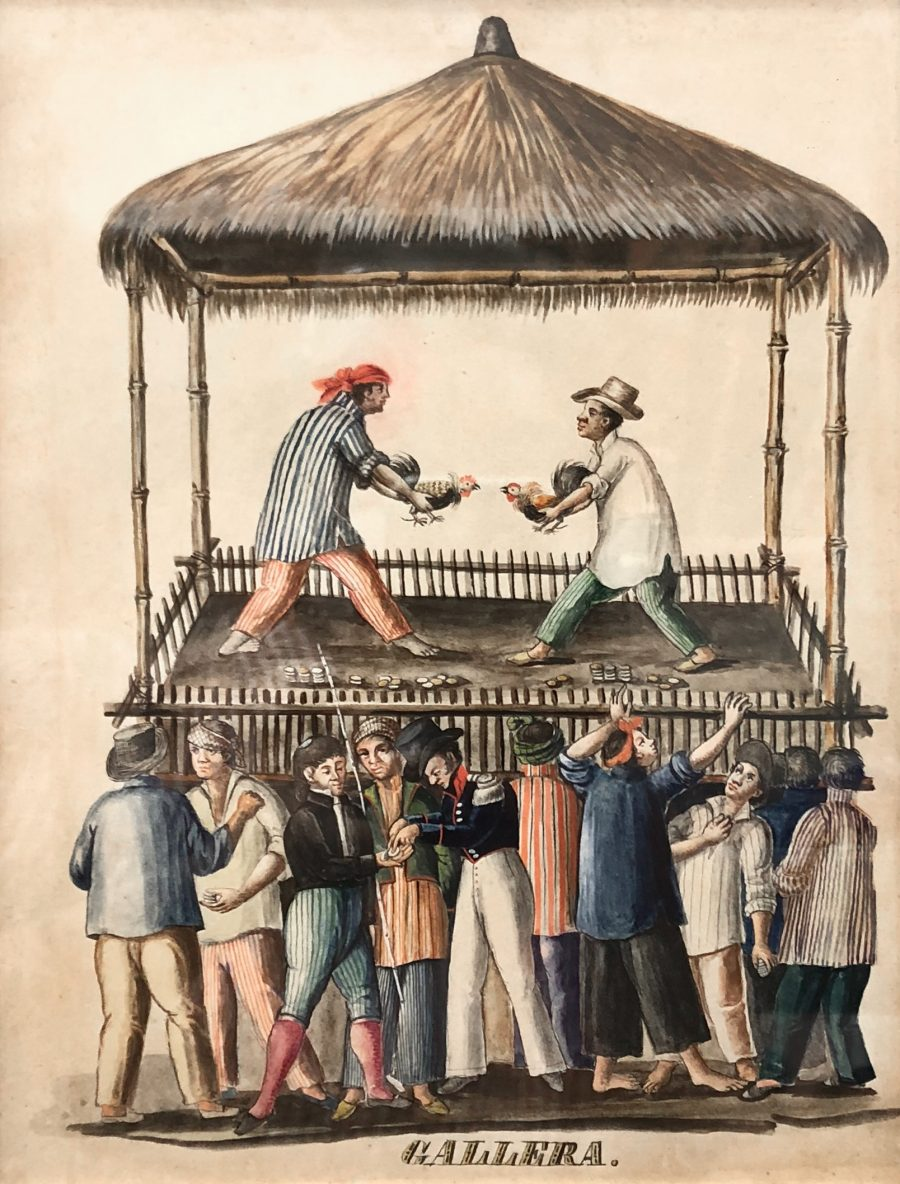
Filipinos cock fighting 19th century

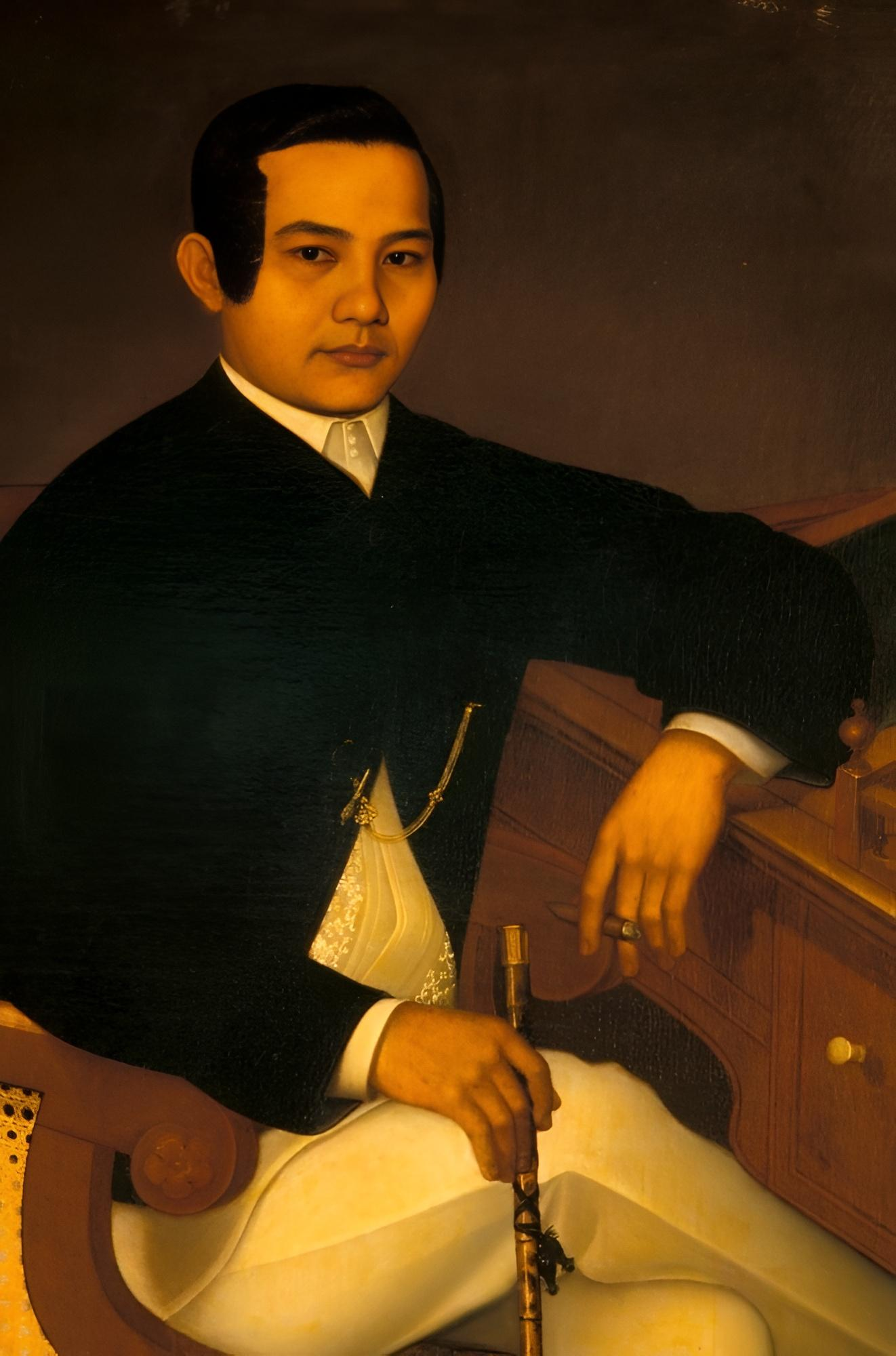
Native Principalía

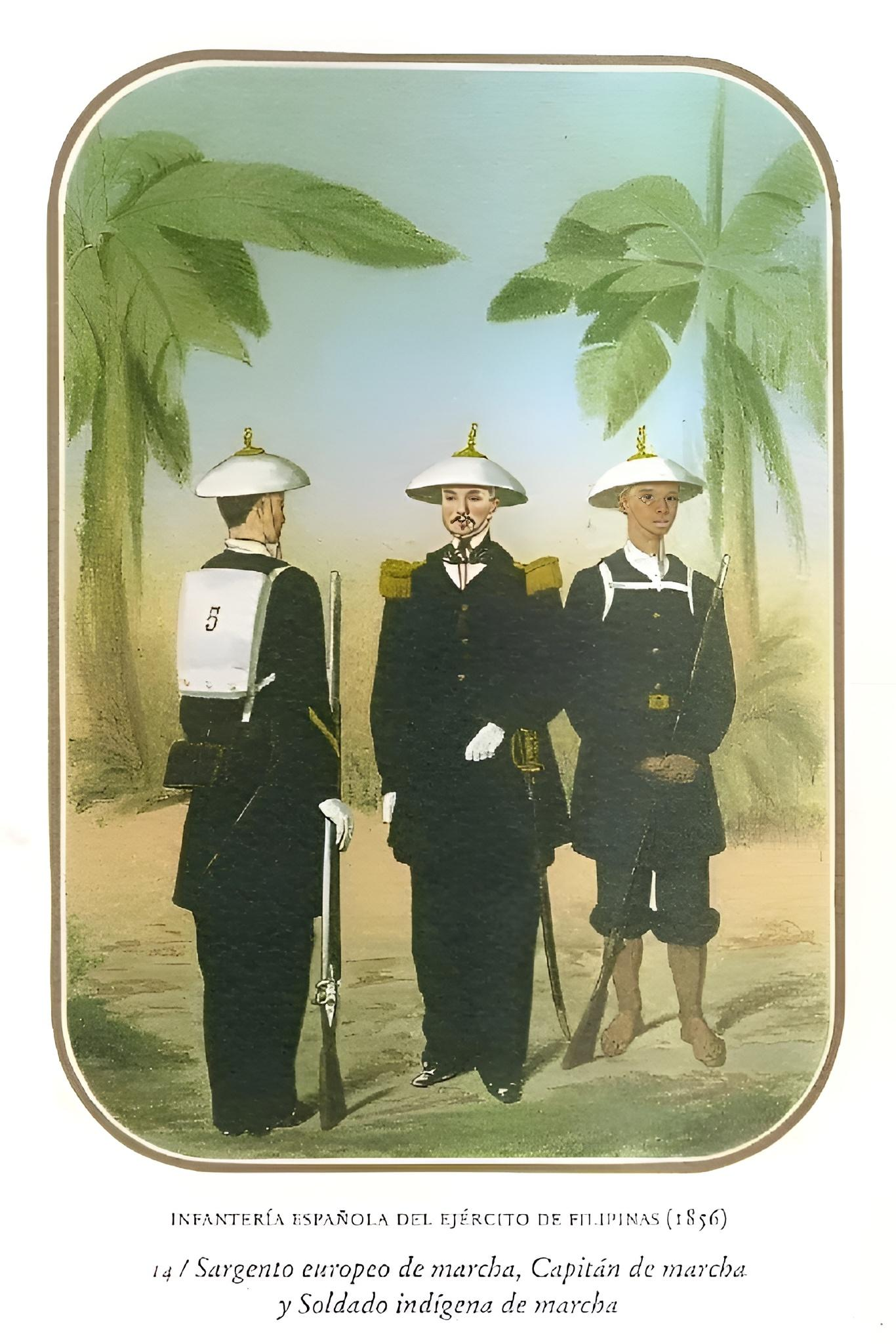
Infantry army unfiorm in the Philippines 1856

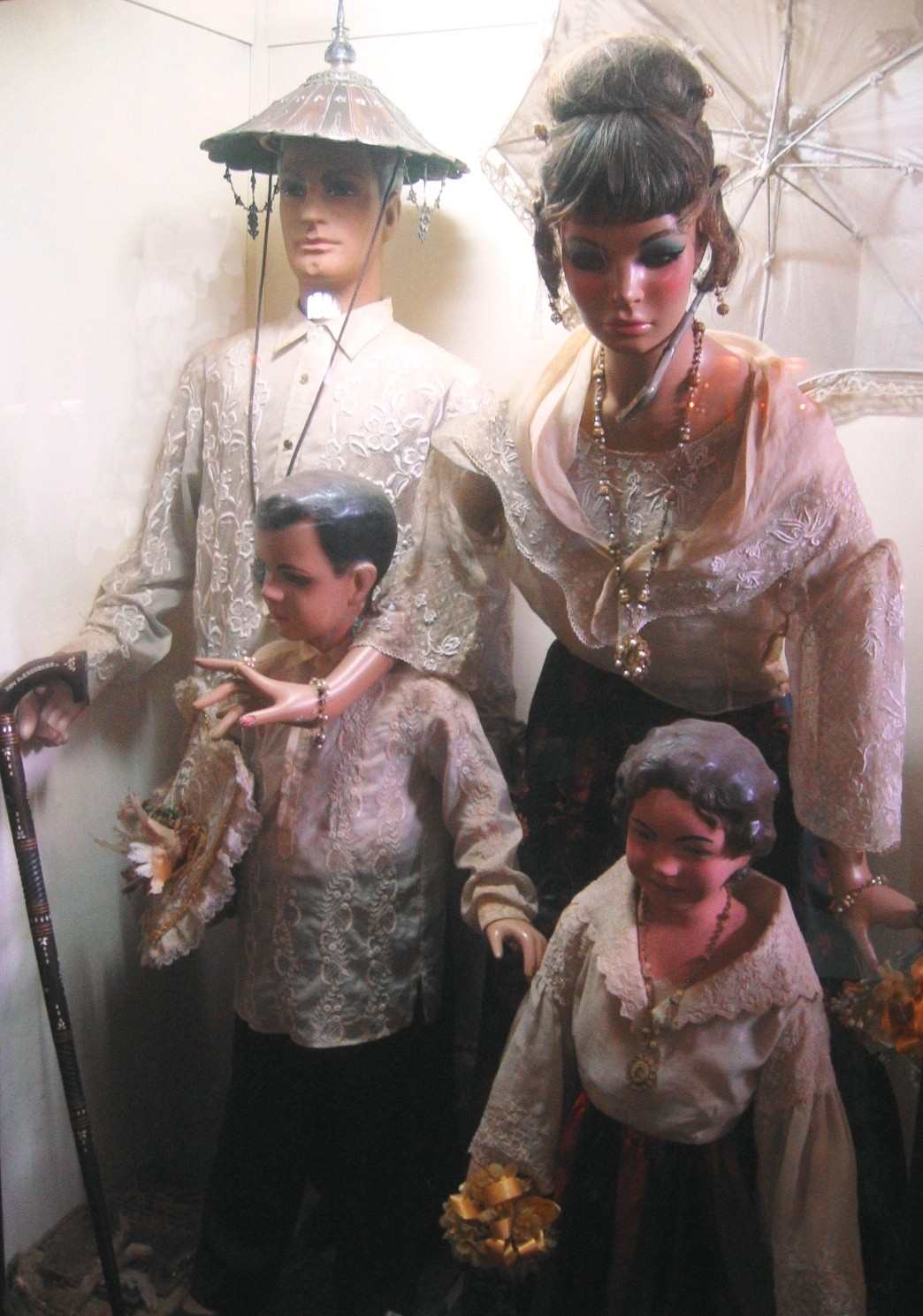
Typical costume of a Principalía family Barong tagalog and Baro't saya.

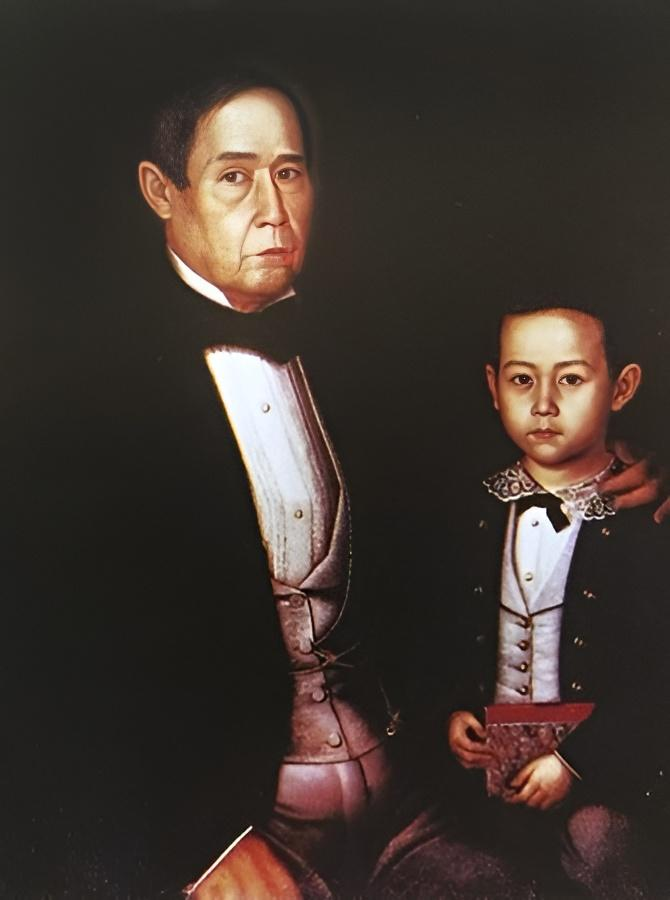
lawyer Don Narciso Padilla circa 1950s.

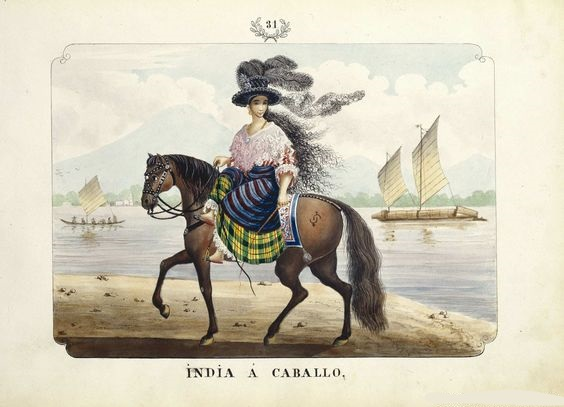
Native woman riding a horse.

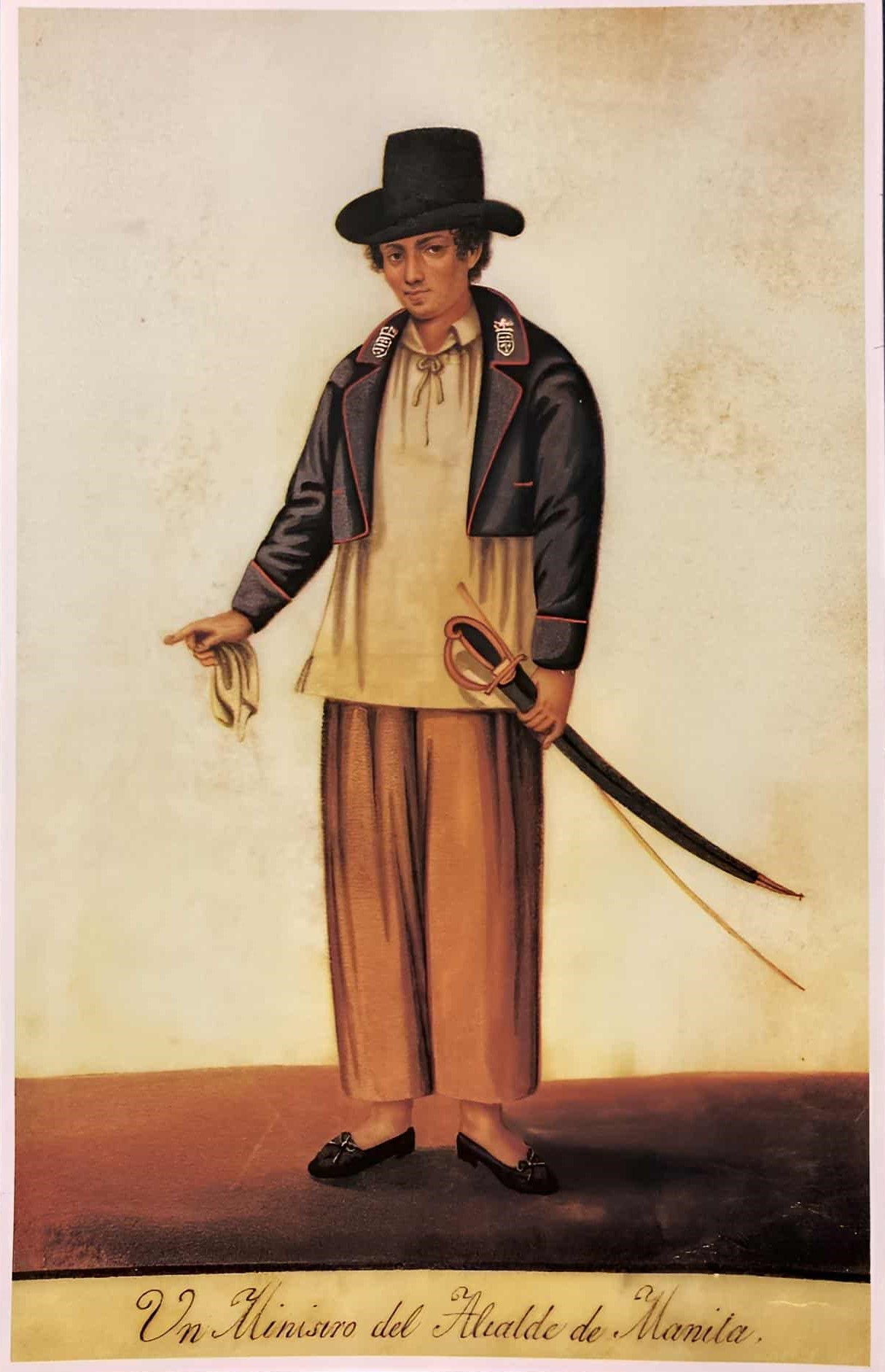
Minister of the Mayor of Manila 1830's

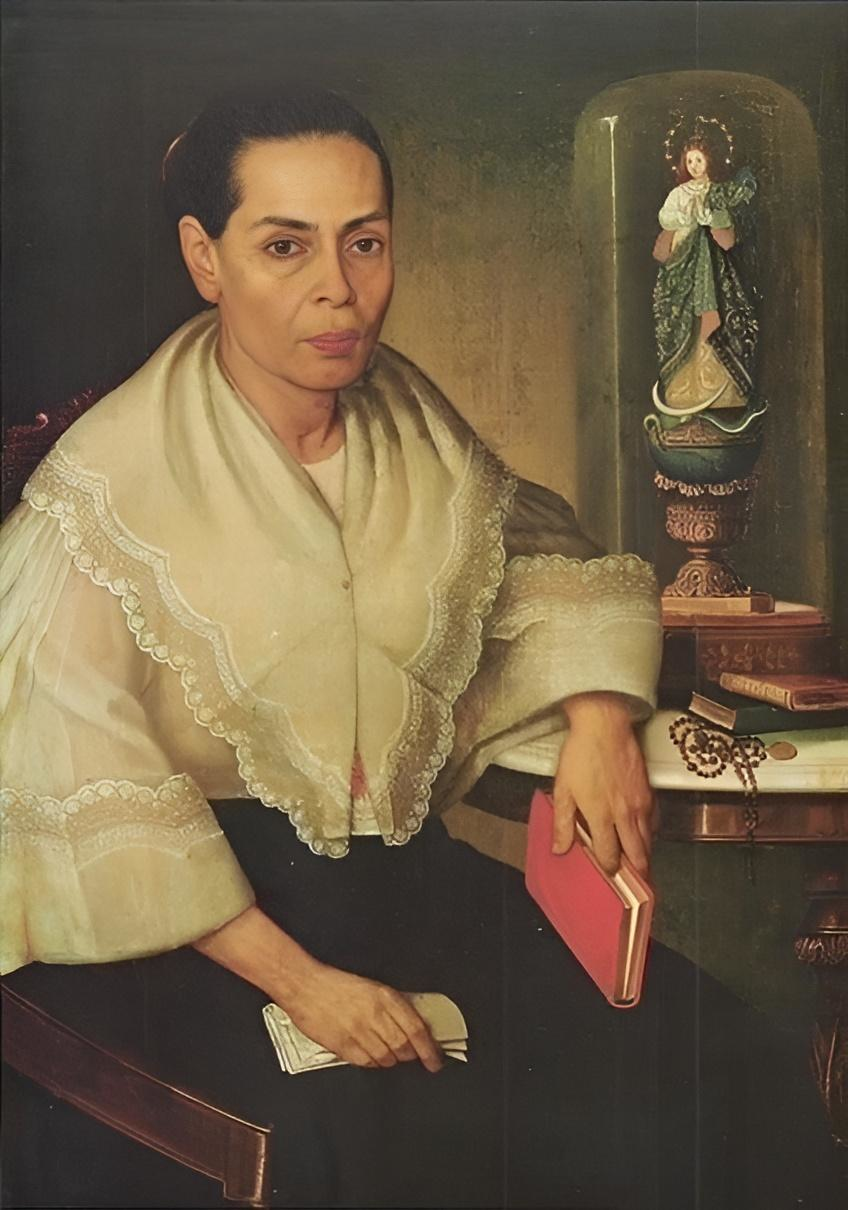
Severina Ocampo de Arroyo painting by Filipino painter Simon Flores y de la Rosa

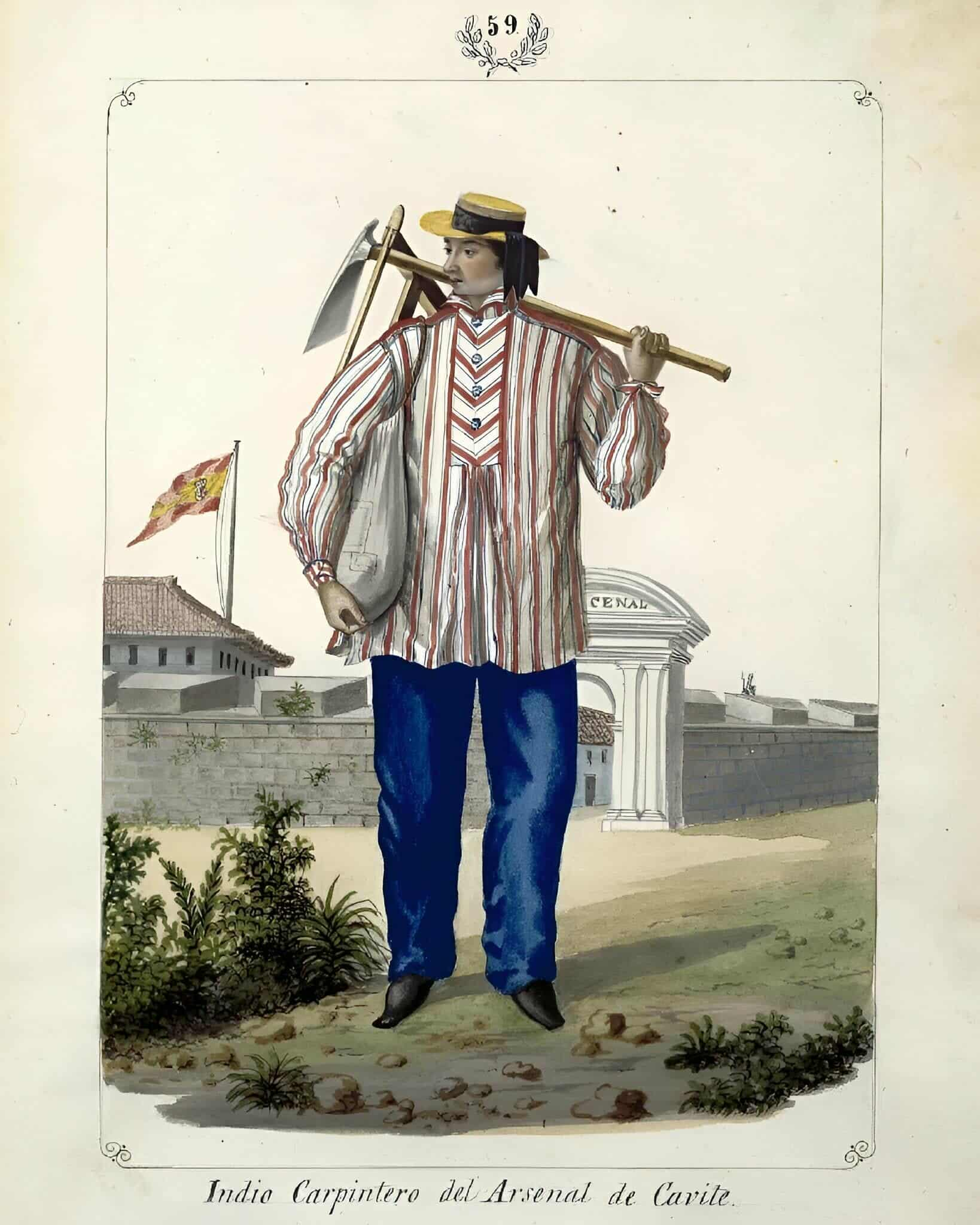
Native arsenal carpenter of Cavite

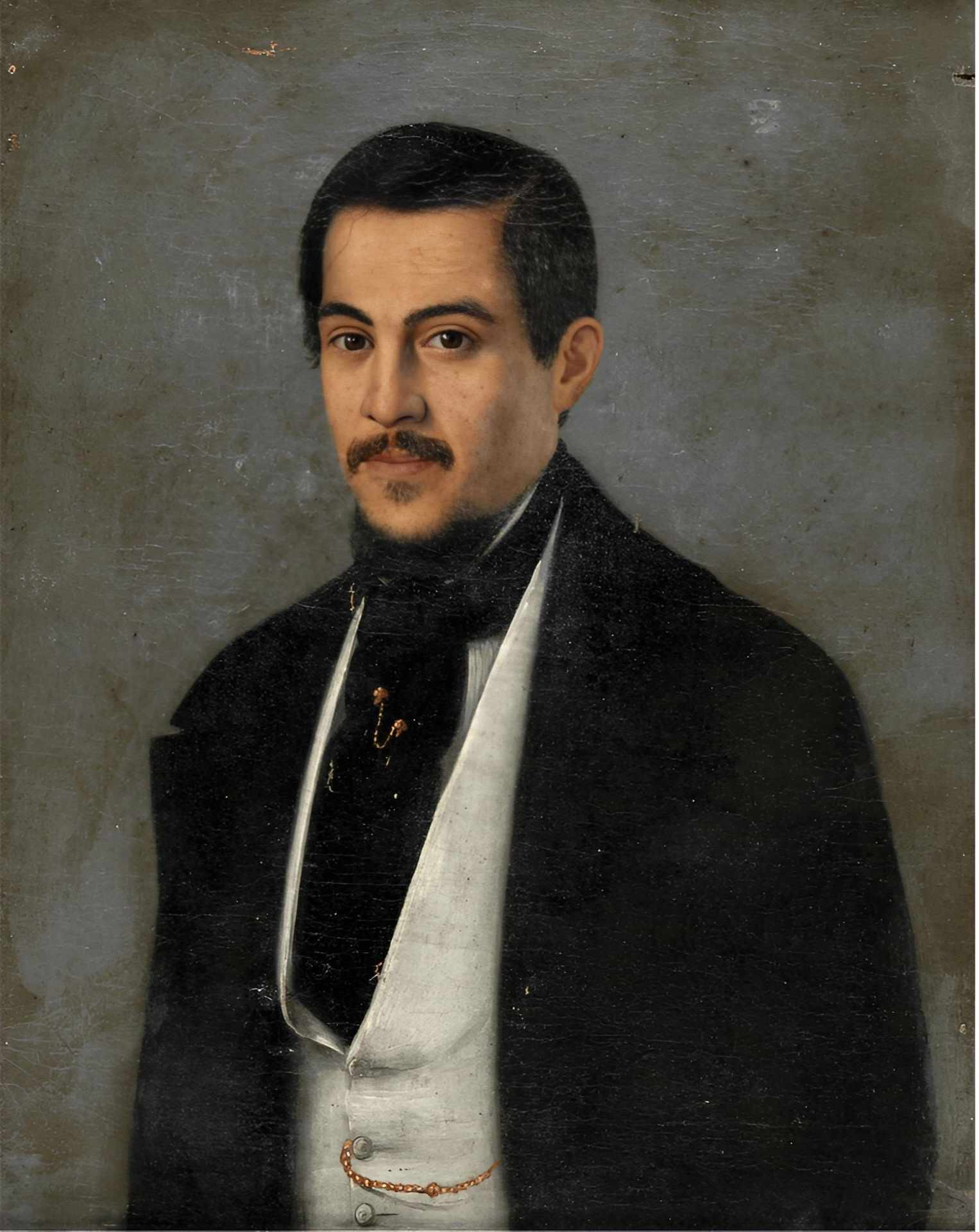
Don Felipe Campomanes 1871

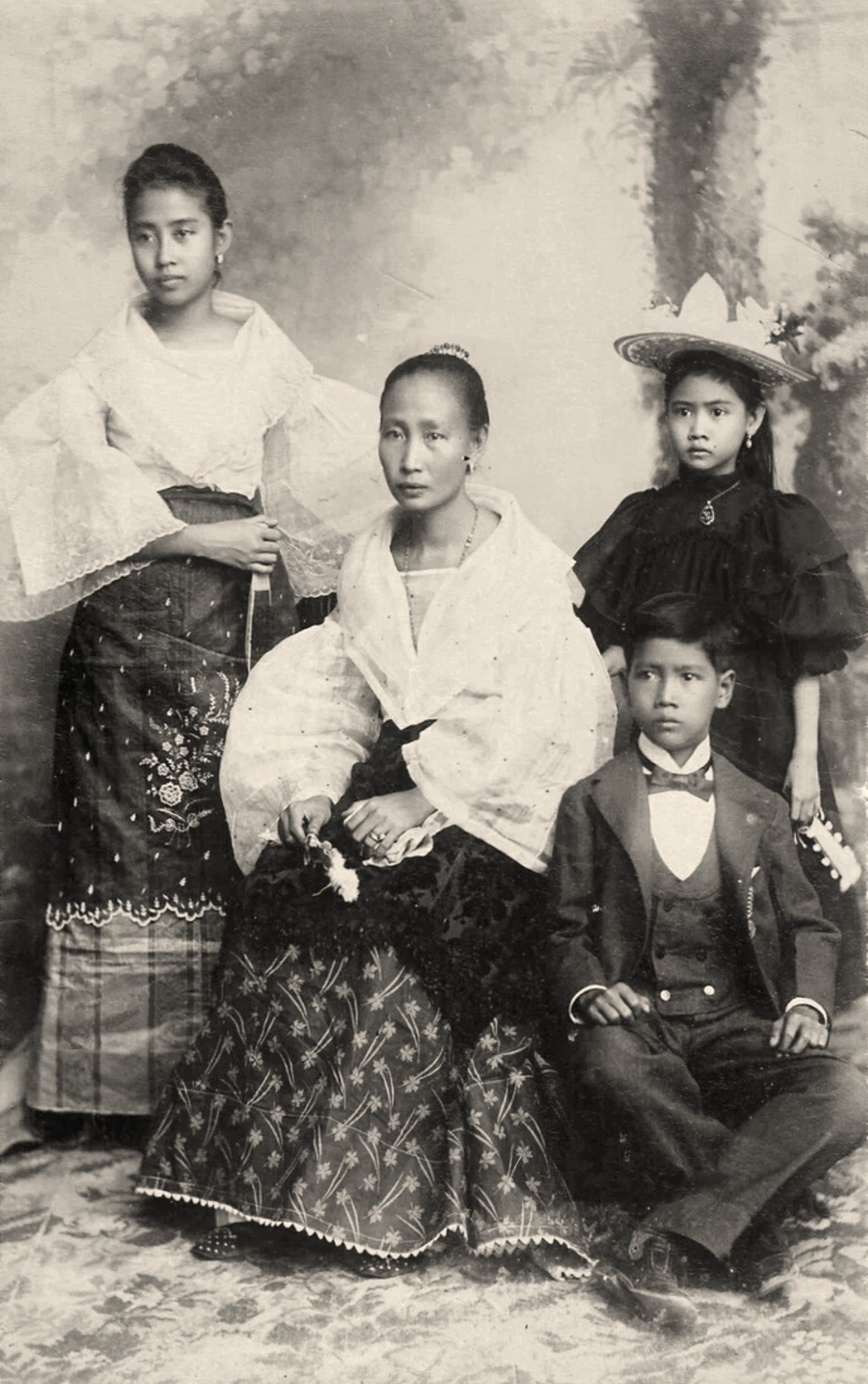
Native Filipino family

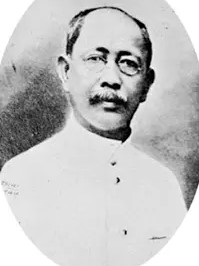
Isabelo Tampinco

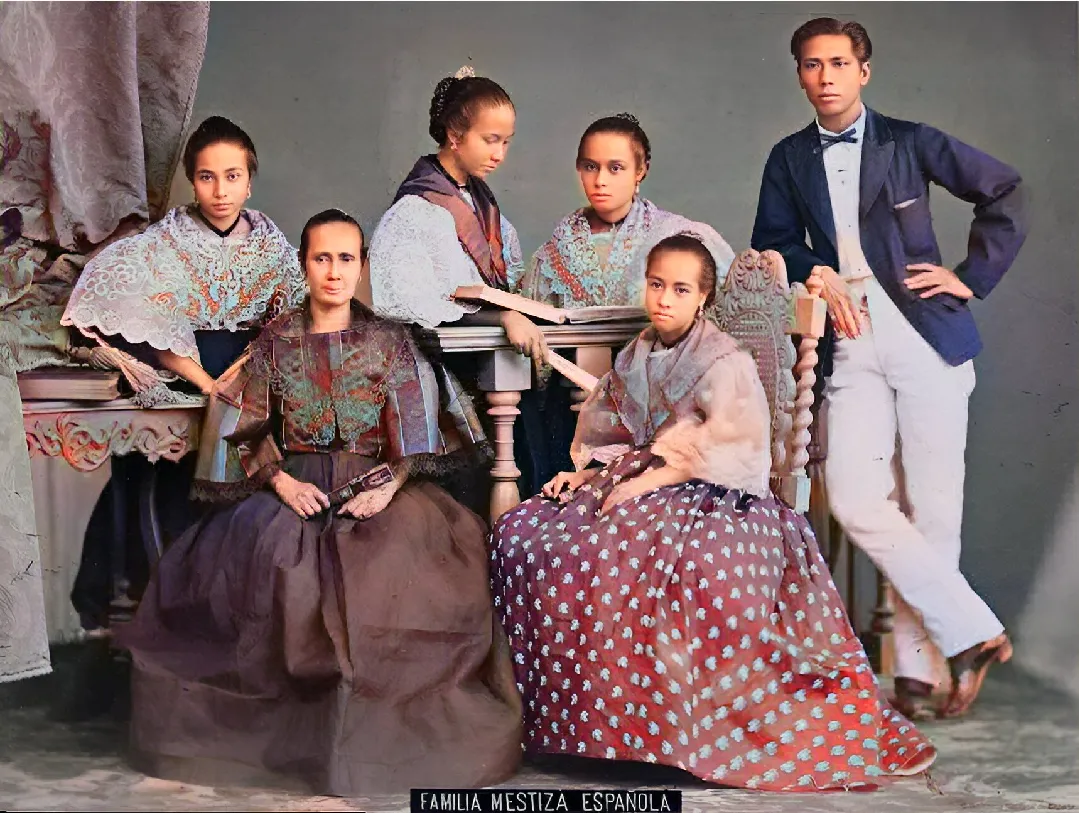
a Mestizo de Español family

== Origins and genetic studies ==
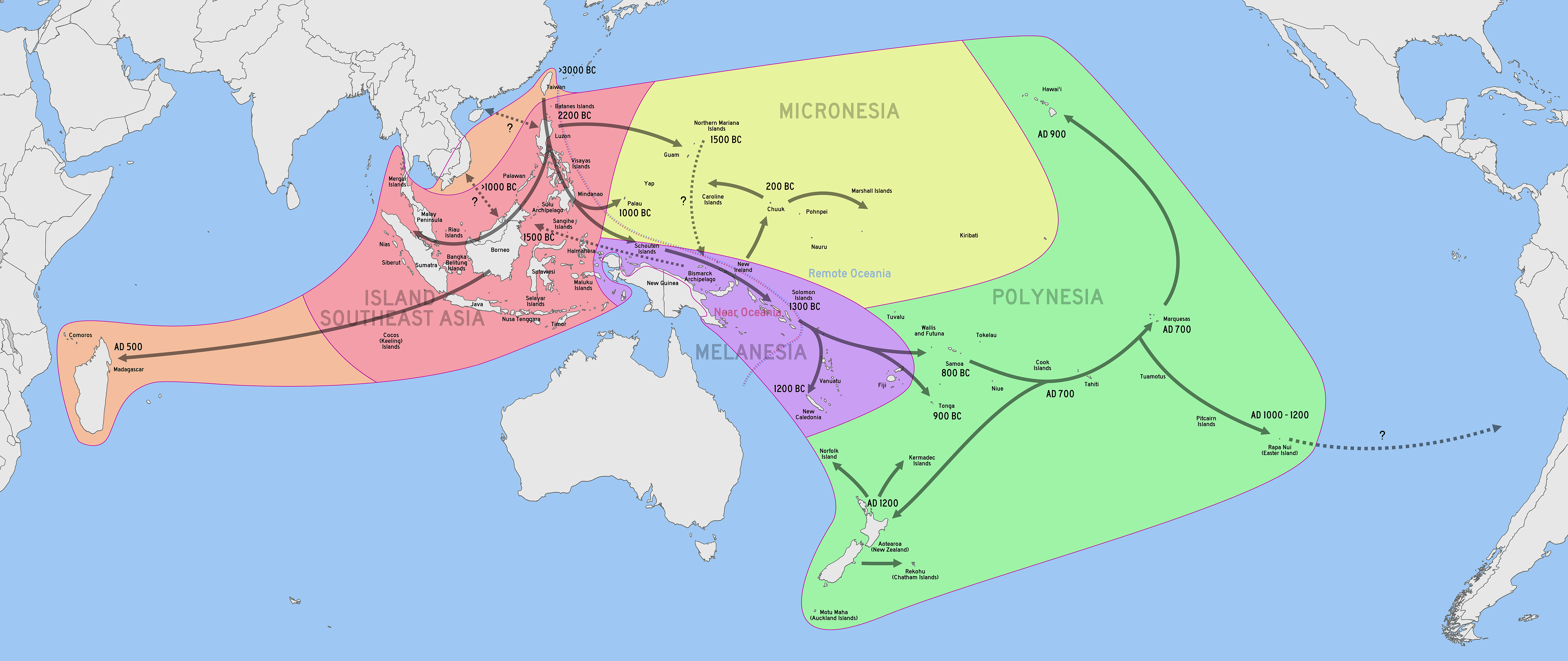
Migration of the Austronesian peoples and their languages.

The aboriginal settlers of the Philippines were primarily Negrito groups. Negritos today comprise a small minority of the nation's overall population, and received significant geneflow from Austronesian groups, as well as an even earlier "Basal-East Asian" group, while the modern Austronesian-speaking majority population does not, or only marginally show evidence for admixture, and cluster closely with other East/Southeast Asian people. There were also immigrations from Austroasiatic, Papuan, and South Asian peoples.

The majority population of Filipinos are Austronesians, a linguistic and genetic group whose historical ties lay in Maritime Southeast Asia and southern East Asia, but through ancient migrations can be found as indigenous peoples stretching as far east as the Pacific Islands and as far west as Madagascar off the coast of Africa. The current predominant theory on Austronesian expansion holds that Austronesians settled the Philippine islands through successive southward and eastward seaborne migrations from the Neolithic Austronesian populations of Taiwan.

Other hypotheses have also been put forward based on linguistic, archeological, and genetic studies. These include an origin from mainland southern China (linking them to the Liangzhu culture and the Tapengkeng culture, later displaced or assimilated by the expansion of speakers of Sino-Tibetan languages); an in situ origin from the Sundaland continental shelf prior to the sea level rise at the end of the last glacial period (c. 10,000 BC); or a combination of the two (the Nusantao Maritime Trading and Communication Network hypothesis) which advocates cultural diffusion rather than a series of linear migrations.

=== Genetics ===
According to a genetic study done by the Kaiser Permanente (KP) Research Program on Genes, Environment, and Health (RPGEH), most self-identified Filipinos sampled, have "modest" amounts of European ancestry consistent with older admixture.

=== Dental morphology ===
Dental morphology provides clues to prehistoric migration patterns of the Philippines, with Sinodont dental patterns occurring in East Asia, Central Asia, North Asia, and the Americas. Sundadont patterns occur in Southeast Asia as well as the bulk of Oceania. Filipinos exhibit Sundadonty, and are regarded as having a more generalised dental morphology and having a longer ancestry than its offspring, Sinodonty.

=== Historic reports ===
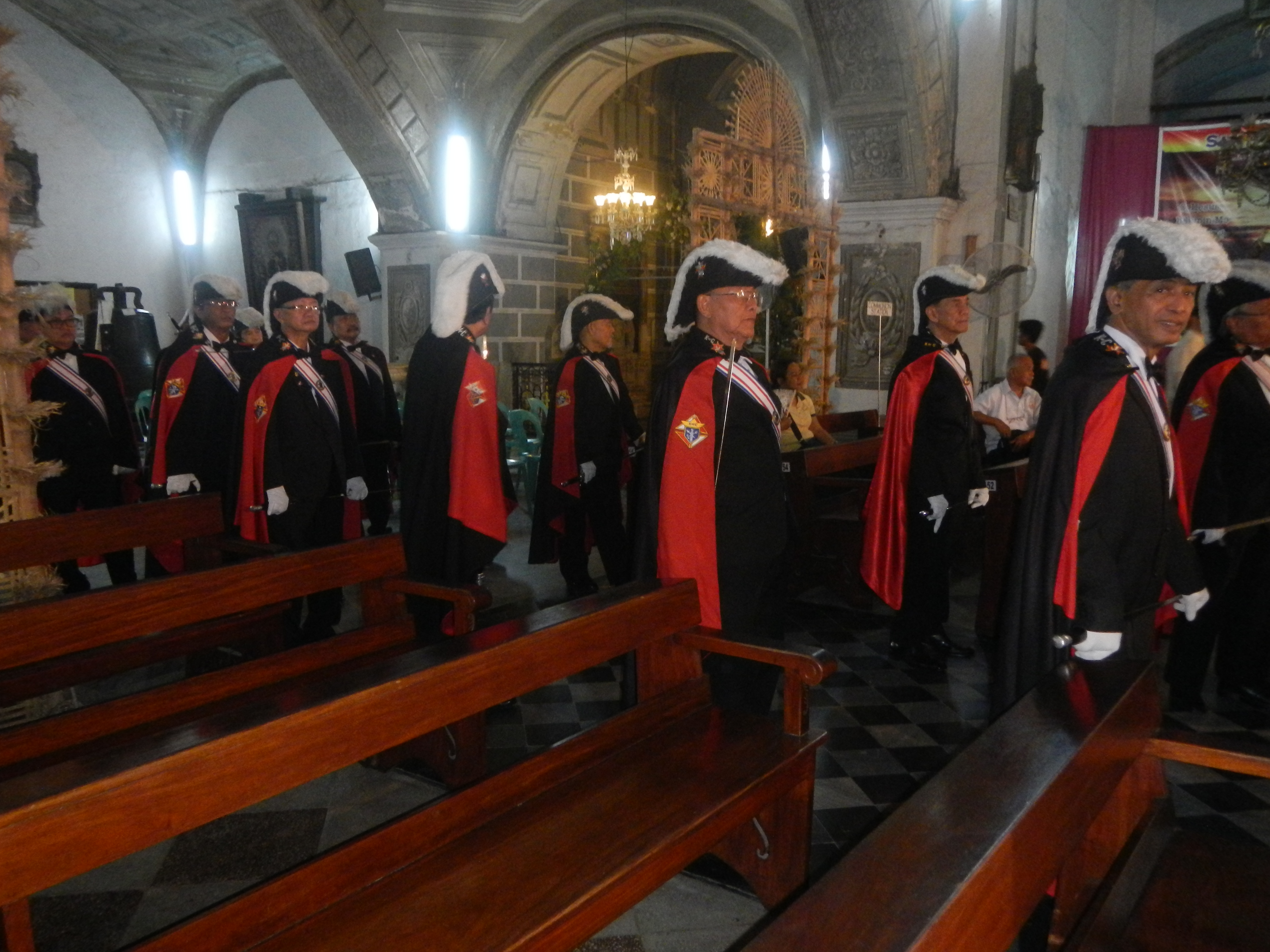
Filipino members of Knights of Columbus.

Published in 1849, The Catalogo Alfabetico de Apellidos contains 141 pages of surnames with both Spanish and Hispanicized indigenous roots.

Authored by Spanish Governor-General Narciso Claveria y Zaldua and Domingo Abella, the catalog was created in response to the Decree of November 21, 1849, which gave every Filipino a surname from the book. The decree in the Philippines was created to fulfill a Spanish colonial decree that sought to address colonial subjects who did not have a last name. This explains why most Filipinos share the same surnames as many Hispanics today, without having Spanish ancestry.

Augustinian Friar, Joaquín Martínez de Zúñiga, in the 1800s, measured varying ratios of Spanish-Mestizos as percentages of the populations of the various provinces, with ranges such as: 19.5% of the population of Tondo (The most populous province), to Pampanga (13.7%), Cavite (13%) and Bulacan (10.8%) to as low as 5% in Cebu, and non-existent in the isolated provinces. Overall the whole Philippines, even including the provinces with no Spanish settlement, as summed up, the average percentage of Spanish Filipino tributes amount to 5% of the total population.

The book, "Intercolonial Intimacies Relinking Latin/o America to the Philippines, 1898–1964 By Paula C. Park" citing "Forzados y reclutas: los criollos novohispanos en Asia (1756-1808)" gave the number of later Mexican soldier-immigrants to the Philippines, pegging the number at 35,000 immigrants in the 1700s, in a Philippine population which was only around 1.5 Million, thus the Latin Americans, mainly Mexicans, formed 2.33% of the population.

In relation to this, a population survey conducted by German ethnographer Fedor Jagor concluded that 1/3rd of Luzon which holds half of the Philippines' population had varying degrees of Spanish and Mexican ancestry.

Meanwhile, according to older records held by the Senate of the Philippines, there were approximately 1.35 million ethnic (or pure) Chinese within the Philippine population, while Filipinos with any Chinese descent comprised 22.8 million people (20% of the population).

=== Current immigration ===
Recent studies during 2015, record around 220,000 to 600,000 American citizens living in the country. This increased to 750,000 Americans living in the Philippines by year 2025, forming 0.75% of the population. There are also 250,000 Amerasians across Angeles City, Manila, Clark and Olongapo, forming 0.25% of the population. Together, the total percentage of individuals who possess full or partial American descent form 1% of the total demographics of the Philippines.

== Languages ==
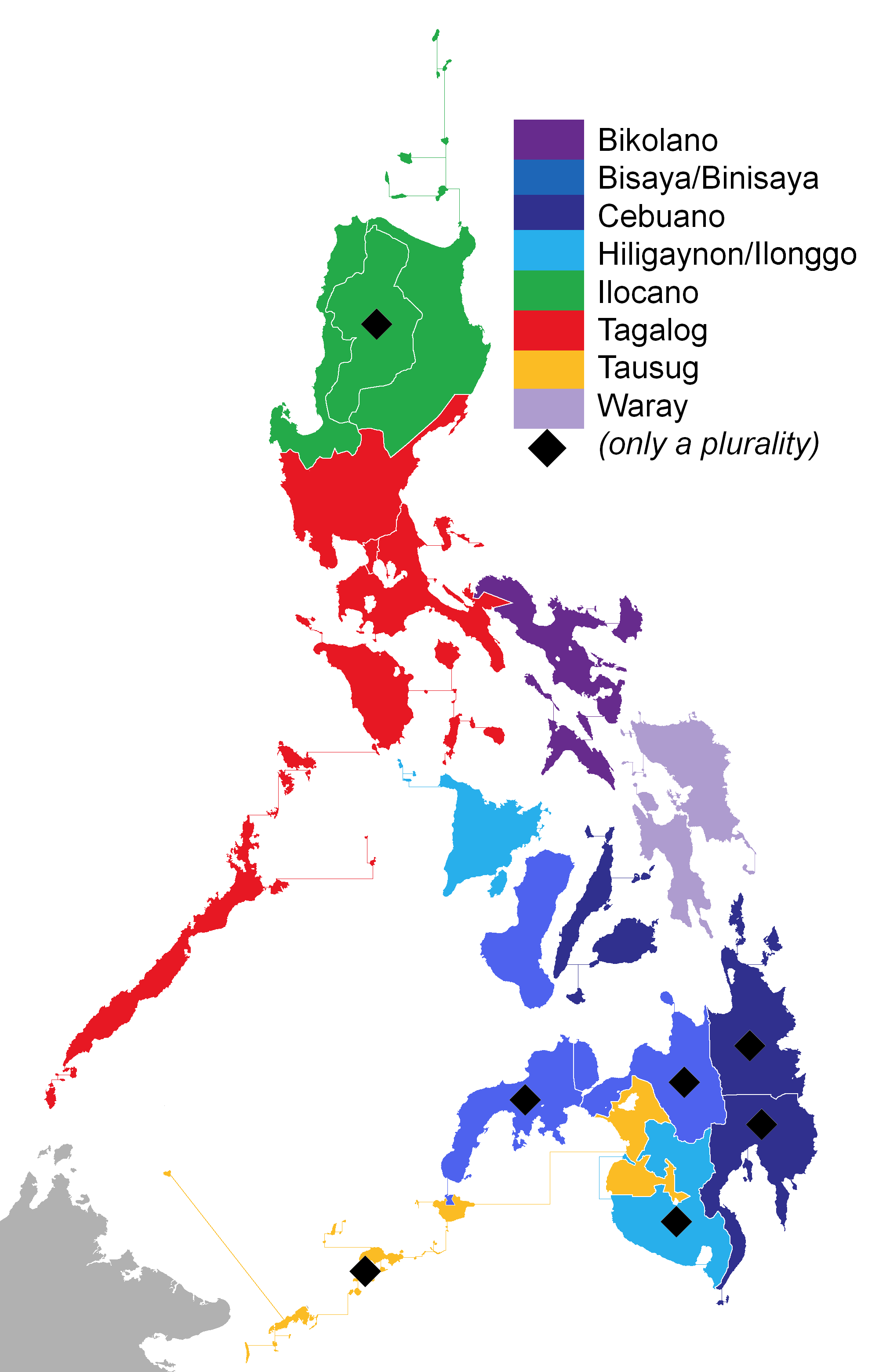
The indigenous (native) Philippine languages spoken around the country that have the largest number of speakers in a particular region with Tagalog being the largest. Note that on regions marked with black diamonds, the language with the most speakers denotes a minority of the population.

Austronesian languages have been spoken in the Philippines for thousands of years. According to a 2014 study by Mark Donohue of the Australian National University and Tim Denham of Monash University, there is no linguistic evidence for an orderly north-to-south dispersal of the Austronesian languages from Taiwan through the Philippines and into Island Southeast Asia (ISEA). Many adopted words from Sanskrit and Tamil were incorporated during the strong wave of Indian (Hindu-Buddhist) cultural influence starting from the 5th century BC, in common with its Southeast Asian neighbors. Chinese languages were also commonly spoken among the traders of the archipelago. However, with the advent of Islam, Arabic and Persian soon came to supplant Sanskrit and Tamil as holy languages. Starting in the second half of the 16th century, Spanish was the official language of the country for the more than three centuries that the islands were governed through Mexico City on behalf of the Spanish Empire. In the 19th and early 20th centuries, Spanish was the preferred language among Ilustrados and educated Filipinos in general. Significant disagreements exist, however, on the extent Spanish use beyond that. It has been argued that the Philippines were less hispanized than Canaries and America, with Spanish only being adopted by the ruling class involved in civil and judicial administration and culture. Spanish was the language of only approximately ten percent of the Philippine population when Spanish rule ended in 1898. As a lingua franca or creole language of Filipinos, major languages of the country like Chavacano, Cebuano, Tagalog, Kapampangan, Pangasinan, Bikol, Hiligaynon, Waray-Waray, and Ilocano assimilated many different words and expressions from Castilian Spanish.

Chavacano is the only Spanish-based creole language in Asia. Its vocabulary is 90 percent Spanish, and the remaining 10 percent is a mixture of predominantly Portuguese, Hiligaynon, and some English. Chavacano is considered by the Instituto Cervantes to be a Spanish-based language.

In sharp contrast, another view is that the ratio of the population which spoke Spanish as their mother tongue in the last decade of Spanish rule was 10% or 14%. An additional 60% is said to have spoken Spanish as a second language until World War II, but this is also disputed as to whether this percentage spoke "kitchen Spanish", which was used as marketplace lingua compared to those who were actual fluent Spanish speakers.

In 1863 a Spanish decree introduced universal education, creating free public schooling in Spanish, yet it was never implemented, even before the advent of American annexation. It was also the language of the Philippine Revolution, and the 1899 Malolos Constitution proclaimed it as the "official language" of the First Philippine Republic, albeit a temporary official language. Spanish continued to be the predominant lingua franca used in the islands by the elite class before and during the American colonial regime. Following the American occupation of the Philippines and the imposition of English, the overall use of Spanish declined gradually, especially after the 1940s.

According to Ethnologue, there are about 180 languages spoken in the Philippines. The 1987 Constitution of the Philippines imposed the Filipino language as the national language and designates it, along with the English language, as one of the official languages. Regional languages are designated as auxiliary official languages. The constitution also provides that Spanish and Arabic shall be promoted on a voluntary and optional basis.

Other Philippine languages in the country with at least 1,000,000 native and indigenous speakers include Cebuano, Ilocano, Hiligaynon, Waray, Central Bikol, Kapampangan, Pangasinan, Chavacano (Spanish-based creole), Albay Bikol, Maranao, Maguindanao, Kinaray-a, Tausug, Surigaonon, Masbateño, Aklanon and Ibanag. The 28-letter modern Filipino alphabet, adopted in 1987, is the official writing system. In addition, each ethnicity's language has their own writing scripts and set of alphabets, many of which are no longer used.

However, there has been a resurgence of these ancient scripts, and initiatives to push the government for standardization. The most prominent script, Baybayin, is a writing system native to the Philippines, with the word 'baybay' meaning "to spell" in Tagalog (Bielenberg, 2018). Due to Spanish colonization, this script was replaced with the Latin alphabet which became the standard of the Philippines. In recent times, there has been a large interest in revitalizing Baybayin, with scholars spreading awareness and education online, and artists interpreting this script into their work.

== Religion ==
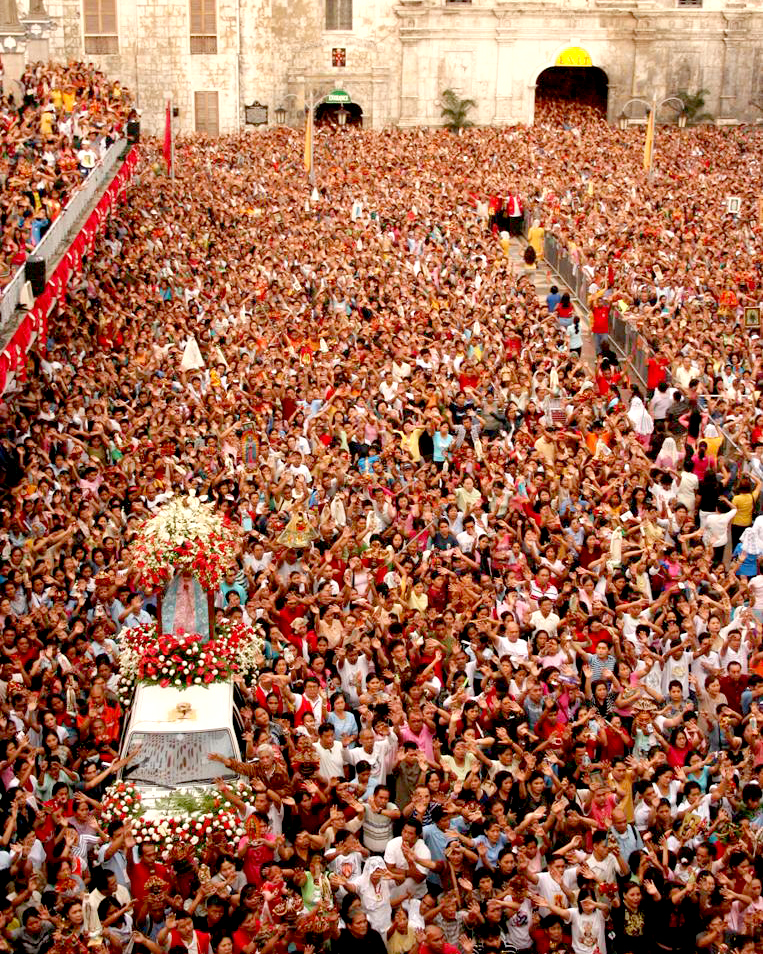
Devotees flock to the Basilica Minore del Santo Niño during the novena Masses.

According to then National Statistics Office (NSO) as of 2010, over 92% of the population were Christians, with 80.6% professing Roman Catholicism. The latter was introduced by the Spanish beginning in 1521, and during their more than 330-year colonization of the islands, they managed to convert a vast majority of Filipinos, resulting in the Philippines becoming the largest predominantly Catholic country in Asia. There are also large groups of Protestant denominations, which either grew or were founded following the disestablishment of the Catholic Church during the American Colonial period. The homegrown Iglesia ni Cristo is currently the single largest church whose headquarters is in the Philippines, followed by United Church of Christ in the Philippines. The Iglesia Filipina Independiente (also known as the Aglipayan Church) was an earlier development, and is a national church directly resulting from the 1898 Philippine Revolution. Other Christian groups such as the Victory Church, Eddie Villanueva-founded and led Jesus Is Lord Church, Jesus Miracle Crusade, Mormonism, Orthodoxy, and the Jehovah's Witnesses have a visible presence in the country.

The second largest religion in the country is Islam, estimated in 2014 to account for 5% to 8% of the population. (Note: Philippines. 2013 Report on International Religious Freedom (Report). United States Department of State. July 28, 2014. SECTION I. RELIGIOUS DEMOGRAPHY. Archived from the original on May 26, 2019. "The 2000 survey states that Islam is the largest minority religion, constituting approximately 5 percent of the population. A 2012 estimate by the National Commission on Muslim Filipinos (NCMF), however, states that there are 10.7 million Muslims, which is approximately 11 percent of the total population.") Islam in the Philippines is mostly concentrated in southwestern Mindanao and the Sulu Archipelago which, though part of the Philippines, are very close to the neighboring Islamic countries of Malaysia and Indonesia. The Muslims call themselves Moros, a Spanish word that refers to the Moors (albeit the two groups have little cultural connection other than Islam).

Historically, ancient Filipinos held animist religions that were influenced by Hinduism and Buddhism, which were brought by traders from neighbouring Asian states. These indigenous Philippine folk religions continue to be present among the populace, with some communities, such as the Aeta, Igorot, and Lumad, having some strong adherents and some who mix beliefs originating from the indigenous religions with beliefs from Christianity or Islam. There are temples also for Sikhism, also located in the provinces and in the cities, sometimes located near Hindu temples.

As of 2013, religious groups together constituting less than five percent of the population included Sikhism, Hinduism, Buddhism, Seventh-day Adventists, United Church of Christ, United Methodists, the Episcopal Church in the Philippines, Assemblies of God, The Church of Jesus Christ of Latter-day Saints (Mormons), and Philippine (Southern) Baptists; and the following domestically established churches: Iglesia ni Cristo (Church of Christ), Philippine Independent Church (Aglipayan), Members Church of God International, Jesus Is Lord Church, and The Kingdom of Jesus Christ, the Name Above Every Name. In addition, there are Lumad, who are indigenous peoples of various animistic and syncretic religions.

== Diaspora ==
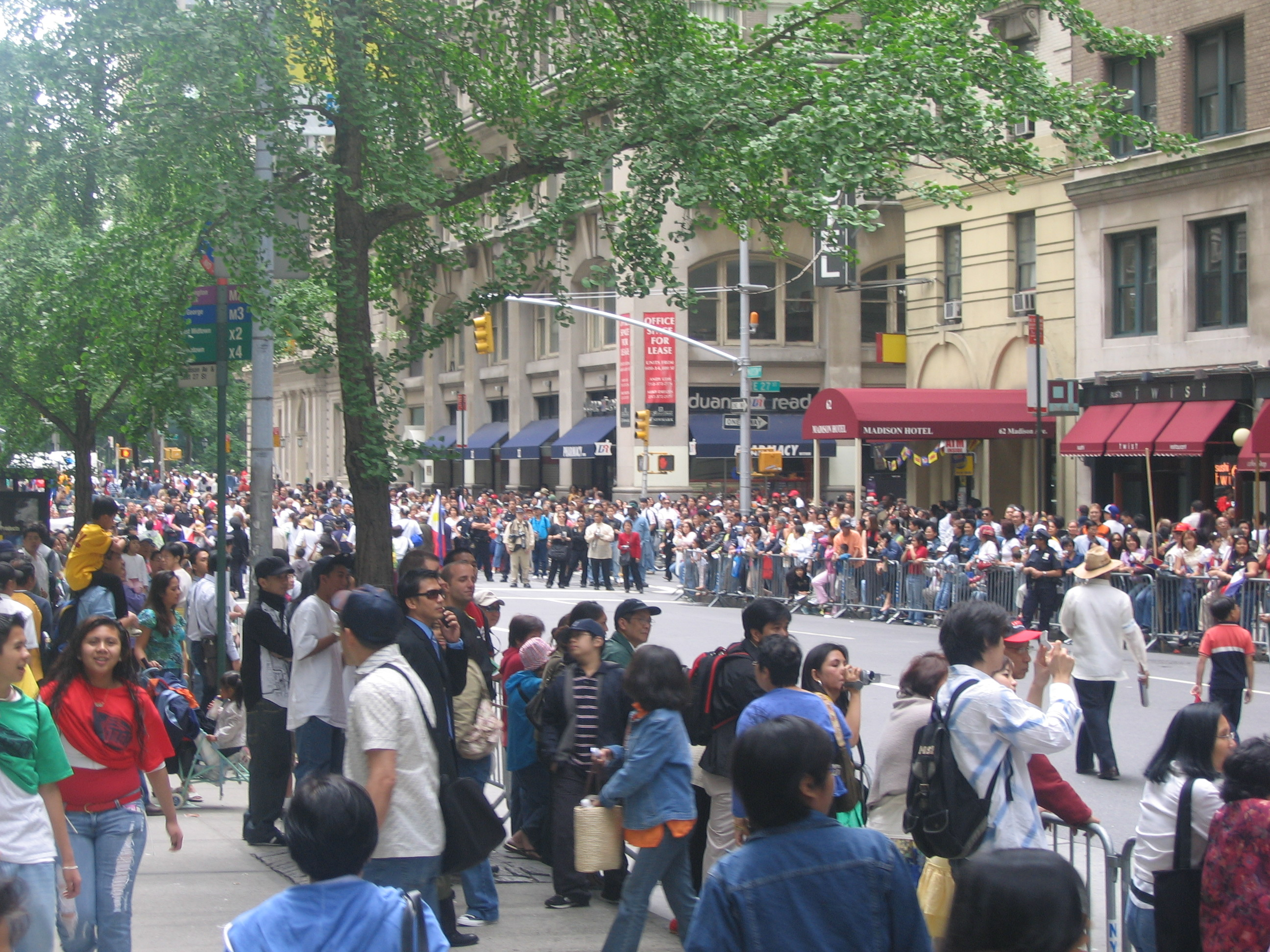
Spectators at the annual Philippine Independence Day Parade on Madison Avenue in Manhattan, New York City

There are currently more than 10 million Filipinos who live overseas. Filipinos form a minority ethnic group in the Americas, Europe, Oceania, the Middle East, and other regions of the world.

There are an estimated four million Americans of Filipino ancestry in the United States, and more than 300,000 American citizens in the Philippines. According to the U.S. Census Bureau, immigrants from the Philippines made up the second largest group after Mexico that sought family reunification.

Filipinos make up over a third of the entire population of the Northern Marianas Islands, an American territory in the North Pacific Ocean, and a large proportion of the populations of Guam, Palau, the British Indian Ocean Territory, and Sabah.

== See also ==
- Arabs in the Philippines
- Chinese Filipino
- Filipino Americans
- Indian Filipino
- Japanese Filipino
- Spanish Filipino

== Publications ==
- Peter Bellwood (July 1991). "The Austronesian Dispersal and the Origin of Languages". Scientific American. 265 (1): 88–93. Bibcode:1991SciAm.265a..88B. doi:10.1038/scientificamerican0791-88.
- Bellwood, Peter; Fox, James; Tryon, Darrell (1995). The Austronesians: Historical and comparative perspectives. Department of Anthropology, Australian National University. ISBN 978-0-7315-2132-6.
- Peter Bellwood (1998). "Taiwan and the Prehistory of the Austronesians-speaking Peoples". Review of Archaeology. 18: 39–48.
- Peter Bellwood; Alicia Sánchez-Mazas (June 2005). "Human Migrations in Continental East Asia and Taiwan: Genetic, Linguistic, and Archaeological Evidence". Current Anthropology. 46 (3): 480–485. doi:10.1086/430018. S2CID 145495386.
- David Blundell. "Austronesian Disperal". Newsletter of Chinese Ethnology. 35: 1–26.
- Robert Blust (1985). "The Austronesian Homeland: A Linguistic Perspective". Asian Perspectives. 20: 46–67.
- Peter Fuller (2002). "Asia Pacific Research". Reading the Full Picture. Canberra, Australia: Research School of Pacific and Asian Studies. Archived from the original on September 27, 2011.
- Penny, Ralph; Penny, Ralph John (2002). A History of the Spanish Language. Cambridge University Press. ISBN 978-0-521-01184-6.
- "Homepage of linguist Dr. Lawrence Reid".
- Malcolm Ross; Andrew Pawley (1993). "Austronesian historical linguistics and culture history". Annual Review of Anthropology. 22: 425–459. doi:10.1146/annurev.an.22.100193.002233.
- Frederic H. Sawyer (1900). The Inhabitants of the Philippines. Library of Alexandria. ISBN 978-1-4655-1185-0.
- Scott, William Henry (1984). Prehispanic Source Materials for the study of Philippine History. New Day Publishers. ISBN 978-971-10-0227-5. ISBN 978-971-10-0226-8.
- John Edward Terrell (December 2004). "Introduction: 'Austronesia' and the great Austronesian migration". World Archaeology. 36 (4): 586–591. doi:10.1080/0043824042000303764. S2CID 162244203.
- Zaide, Sonia M. (1999) [1994]. The Philippines: A Unique Nation. All-Nations Publishing. ISBN 978-971-642-071-5.
- Jocano, F. Landa (2001). Filipino Prehistory: Rediscovering Precolonial Heritage. Quezon City: Punlad Research House, Inc. ISBN 978-971-622-006-3.
