= Philippines–European Union relations =

- European Union: Philippines

Diplomatic mission
- European Union Delegation, Makati: Philippine Mission, Brussels

Envoy
- Ambassador Massimo Santoro: Ambassador Jaime Victor B. Ledda

The European Union and the Philippines share diplomatic, economic, cultural, and political relations. The European Union has provided millions of euros to the Philippines to fight poverty and counter-terrorism against terrorist groups in the southern Philippines. The European Union is also the third-largest trading partner of the Philippines. There are more than 30,000 Europeans living in the Philippines, not including Spaniards because many Spaniards who settled during the colonial era (1565–1898) intermarried and assimilated into Filipino society. As a result, their descendants are often considered Filipino rather than foreign nationals.

== Bilateral relations ==
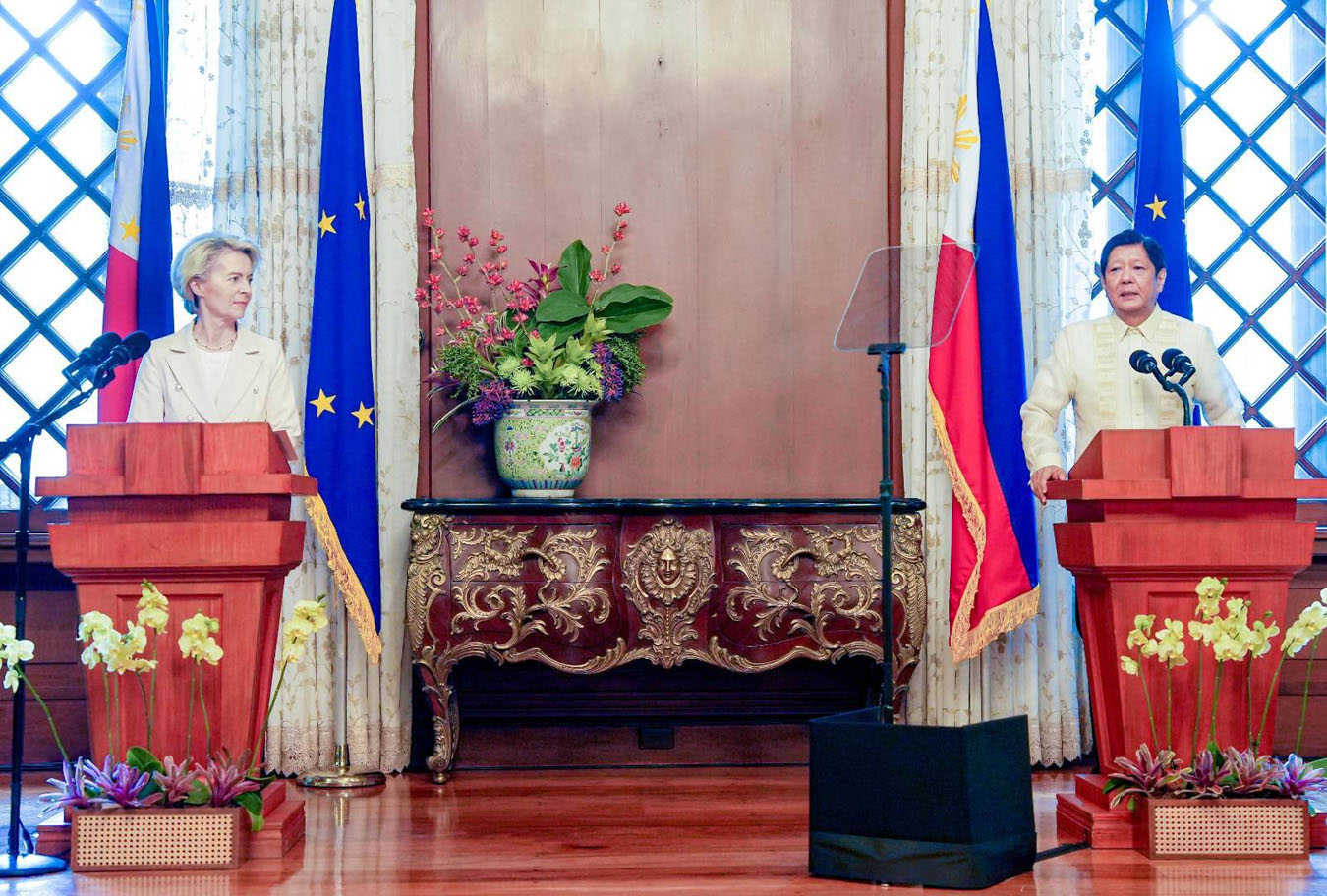
European Commission president Ursula von der Leyen and Philippine president Bongbong Marcos at Malacañang Palace in Manila, July 2023

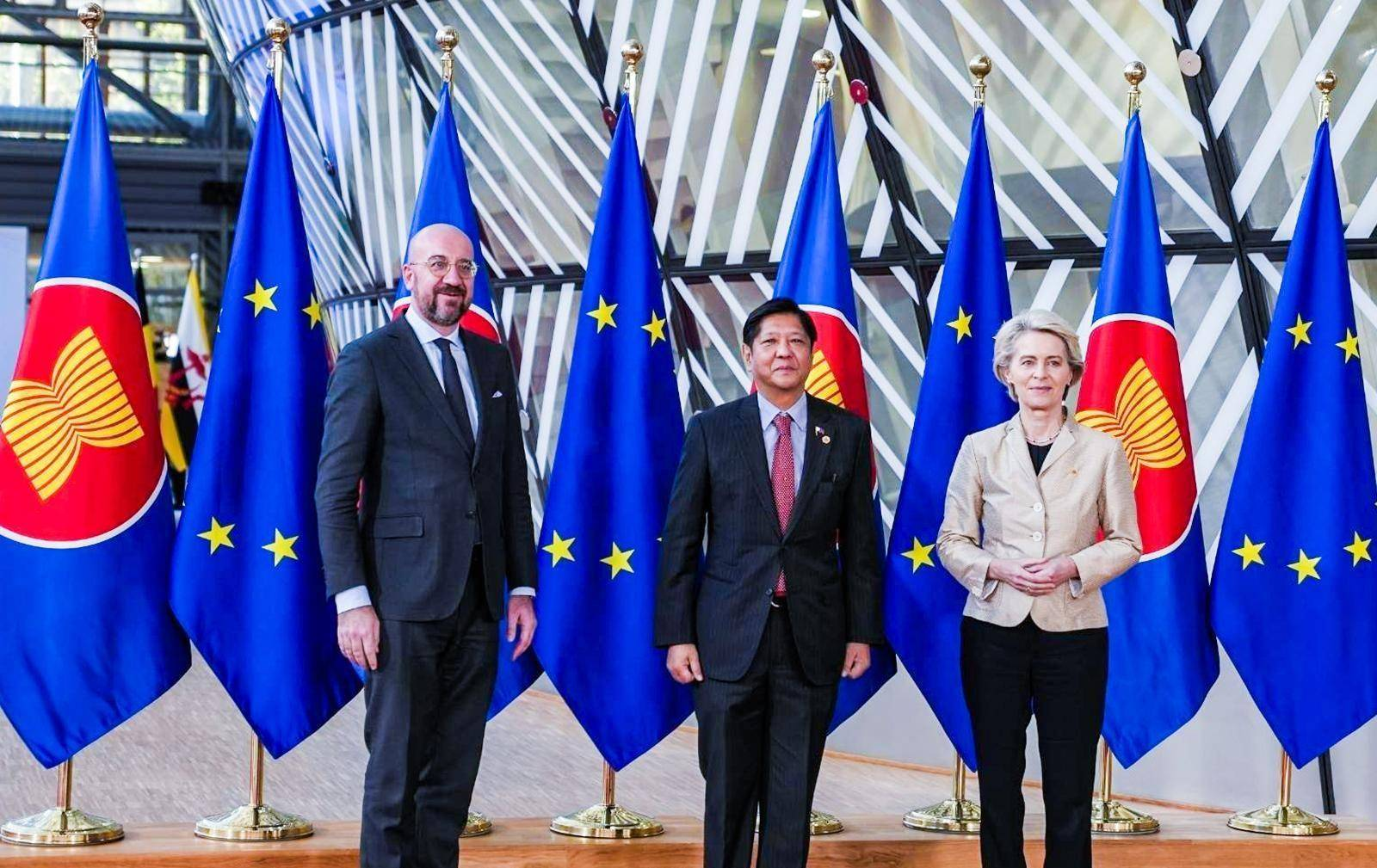
European Council president Charles Michel, Philippine president Bongbong Marcos, and European Commission president Ursula von der Leyen in Brussels, December 2022

The European Union and the Philippines are coming up with a more comprehensive bilateral agreement that will further strengthen the dialogue, cooperation and action in their partnership, specifically the issue of migration. There are more than 900,000 Filipinos in Europe. The Philippines exports to the European Union include: coconut oil, electronic micro assemblies, electrical and electronic machinery, equipment, semiconductor devices, storage units, static converters, other brakes and servo-brakes and parts, and digital monolithic integrated circuits.

EU–Filipino ties soured during the Philippine drug war under President Rodrigo Duterte. In September 2016, in response to growing casualties and extrajudicial killings, the European Parliament expressed concern over the, "extraordinarily high numbers killed during police operations ... in the context of an intensified anti-crime and anti-drug campaign". In a resolution passed by the EU, it called for the government to investigate abuse, "in full compliance with national and international obligations and respect for human rights" and stated that, "President Duterte repeatedly urged law enforcement agencies and the public to kill suspected drug traffickers who did not surrender, as well as drug users". They also claimed that "President Duterte publicly stated he would not pursue law enforcement officers and citizens who killed drug dealers who resisted arrest".

In response, President Duterte lambasted at the EU politicians, singling out those from Britain and France, calling them "hypocrites" and accusing them of being responsible for the deaths of thousands caused by their ancestors during the colonial period. Raising his middle finger, Duterte stated that he told EU politicians, "Fuck you. You are only doing it to atone for your own sins" and "They do not want a safe Philippines. They want it to be ruled by criminals. Oh, well, I'm sorry. That is your idiotic view". Duterte also claimed, in response to growing international criticism, the "EU now has the gall to condemn me. I repeat it, 'fuck you'". On January 24, 2018, P380 million (6.1 million euros) in aid spearheaded by the administration of former president Noynoy Aquino through a deal was officially rejected and blocked by President Rodrigo Duterte due to the belief that the Philippines does not need aid from any country. On the same month, Duterte welcomed aid from China, in exchange, allowed Chinese research vessels to enter the Philippine Rise. Duterte's move to block the European aid was rejected by 70% of Filipinos according to a poll.

On September 18, 2020, the European Union pointed out the lack of human rights in the Philippines under the Duterte administration. The administration has been facing a lot of opposition in the international community, as it launched one of the most controversial programs, the "Philippine drug war". The program has brought a rise in extra-judicial killings (EJK) that has angered local and international audiences. During a meeting of the European Union, the parliament discussed potential tariffs and sanctions on Philippine trade, causing a commotion in the Congress of the Philippines. Presidential Spokesperson Harry Roque has pleaded to the international ambassadors to the EU to convince them that the condition of the Filipino people is okay. House Leader Alan Peter Cayetano has sent a letter to the European Union that states its dedication into international comity and recognition of sovereignty.

== Agreement ==
An agreement signed covers legal migration, maritime labor, education, and training. The agreement also provides dialogue and cooperation on political matters including the peace process on trade and investment such as customs facilitation and intellectual property rights on justice and security. After many years of negotiation under President Noynoy Aquino, the P383.64 million in aid deal to the Philippines from the EU was formally approved in 2018, however, was rejected and blocked by President Rodrigo Duterte, the new incumbent at the time, citing personal hatred towards the EU. The EU has criticized Duterte for his deadly drug war which has killed more than 14,000 Filipino drug suspects in less than 18 months and the imprisonment of opposition senator Leila de Lima due to testimonies from rapists, murderers, and drug traffickers which de Lima sent to jail when she was Justice Secretary. The senator was denied bail from a case that was deemed bailable by Filipino laws.

== Trade ==
EU – Philippines trade in 2011.
Direction of trade	Investment flow	Investment stocks	Others
EU to the Philippines	€9 billion	€5 billion	€1.1 billion
Philippines to EU	€7.9 billion	€430 million	€1.7 billion

== Humanitarian aid ==
In December 2011, Northern Mindanao was devastated by Tropical Storm Washi. The European Commission allocated €3 million ($3.9 million) to provide emergency relief to people affected by Tropical Storm Washi. In December 2012, the European Commission provided €10 million (PH₱ 543 million) for the victims of Typhoon Bopha, notably in the provinces of Compostela Valley and Davao Oriental in Mindanao. After Typhoon Haiyan in November 2013, the European Commission announced a donation of €3 million to be made for the victims affected by the tropical storm.

== Commercial aviation ==
The Philippines were among the countries with air carriers banned in the European Union. However, in 2013, the European Union lifted a three-year ban on Philippine Airlines flying into its airspace after the national carrier addressed safety concerns. The European Commission and the Air Safety Committee are encouraged by the actions being taken by the Civil Aviation Authority of the Philippines and Philippine air carriers to address outstanding safety issues. In April 2014, the European Union lifted its ban on Cebu Pacific, making it the second airline in the Philippines with granted rights to fly within the European Union airspace. The following year, in June 2015, the European Union announced that the ban of all Philippine-based airlines was lifted, removing the country from the list.

== Philippines's foreign relations with EU member states ==
- Austria
- Belgium
- Bulgaria
- Croatia
- Cyprus
- Czech Republic
- Denmark
- Estonia
- Finland
- France
- Germany
- Greece
- Hungary
- (Republic of Ireland) Ireland
- Italy
- Latvia
- Lithuania
- Luxembourg
- Malta
- Netherlands
- Poland
- Portugal
- Romania
- Slovakia
- Slovenia
- Spain
- Sweden

== See also ==
- Foreign relations of the European Union
- Foreign relations of the Philippines
