= Philippines–Ukraine relations =

- Philippines: Ukraine

Diplomatic mission
- Embassy of the Philippines, Warsaw: Embassy of Ukraine, Makati

Envoy
- Ambassador Alan Deniega: Ambassador Yuliia Fediv

The bilateral relations of the Philippines and Ukraine began with a formal agreement in 1992. Ukraine has an embassy in Metro Manila, while the Philippines is represented by its embassy in Warsaw, Poland. The Philippines is also supported with an honorary consulate general in Kyiv.

== History ==
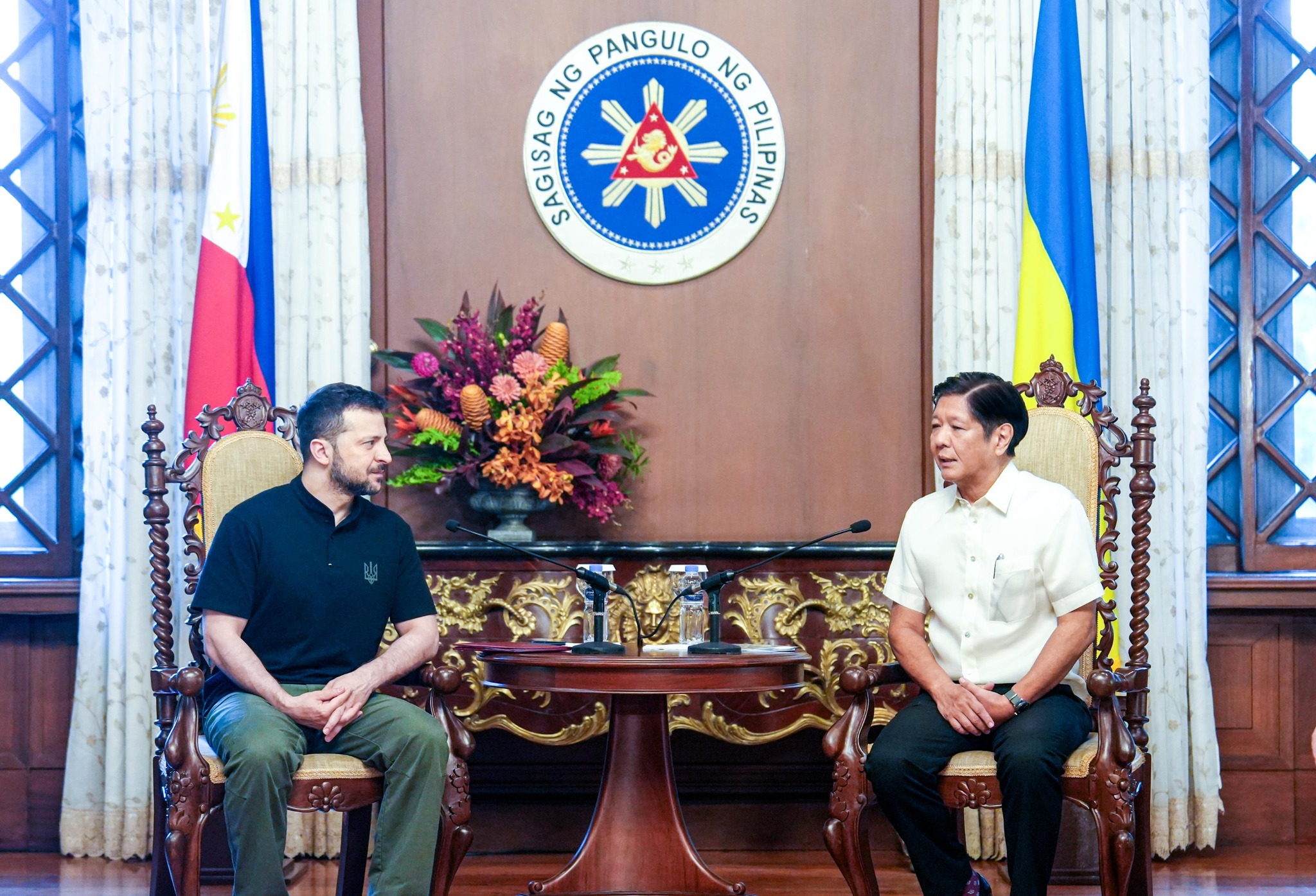
Ukrainian President Volodymyr Zelenskyy meets with Philippine President Bongbong Marcos in Manila, 3 June 2024

The Philippines recognized Ukraine's independence on 22 January 1992 and formal relations began on 7 April 1992. Until June 1993, bilateral relations were maintained through the Philippine embassy in Poland. Prior to December 2004, Ukraine maintained relations with the Philippines through its embassies in Indonesia and Vietnam.

Starting in 1993, the Philippine embassy in Moscow handled bilateral relations with Ukraine, but has since moved to the Philippine embassy in Warsaw. Since December 2004, Ukraine maintained its relations with the Philippines through its embassy in Tokyo, but has since moved it to its ambassador in Kuala Lumpur.

In April 1997 a Ukrainian parliamentary delegation to Manila signed an interparliamentary cooperation agreement. In July 2003 Philippine Vice-president Teofisto Guingona met Ukrainian Foreign Minister Anatoliy Zlenko in Manila. At the meeting, they signed a protocol on political cooperation. In June 2005, Speaker Jose de Venecia led a House delegation to Ukraine, and met with Ukrainian President Victor Yushchenko and other top officials. They discussed Christian-Muslim interfaith dialogue, the development of two energy plants in the Philippines by the Ukrainian company Sukhin Energy Incorporated, and a debt conversion initiative.

As of June 2019, there are 342 Overseas Filipinos in Ukraine, and the Philippine government has been actively attending to them and promoting the country's interests through the Honorary Consulate in Kyiv. As of March 2020, around 200 Ukrainians are residing in the Philippines.

Amidst the 2022 Russian invasion of Ukraine, the Department of Foreign Affairs raised Alert Level 4, signifying the mandatory evacuation of all Filipino nationals from Ukraine. The Philippines evacuated 342 of its nationals by March 2022. Under Philippine president Rodrigo Duterte, the Philippines voted in favor of the United Nations resolution condemning the Russian invasion. Philippine Presidential candidate Bongbong Marcos has said: "I don't think there is a need to make a stand. We are not involved, except for our nationals.” In November 2022, during the APEC summit in Thailand, President Marcos has said that the war is "unacceptable" and has urged peace between the two nations.

Ukraine seeks to establish an embassy in the Philippines, but budgetary constraints have delayed this endeavor. On the other hand, in June 2022, Foreign Affairs Secretary Teodoro Locsin Jr. said that the Philippines seeks to establish an embassy in Ukraine. However, as of January 2023, the Philippines has not made any requests to establish an embassy in Kyiv.

Presentation of Credentials of the Ambassador of Ukraine on 25 March 2025 after the formal opening of its embassy in December 2024.

Ukrainian President Volodymyr Zelenskyy visited Manila on 3 June 2024, and met with President Marcos, making Zelenskyy the first Ukrainian president to visit the Philippines. During this visit, Zelenskyy confirmed that Ukraine would open an embassy in the Philippines that year. Zelenskyy also announced that the Philippines would attend a Ukraine-organized peace conference being held in Switzerland and thanked the Philippines for its support. Following Zelenskyy's request, Marcos assured Zelenskyy that he will allow the Philippines to send Filipino mental health workers to Ukraine to help Ukrainian soldiers.

Ukraine's embassy to the Philippines was formally established in December 2024. On 25 March 2025, Philippine President Marcos received the credentials of Ukraine Ambassador Yuliia Fediv to formally start her tenue. On 26 March 2026, Ukraine Deputy Minister for Foreign Affairs Olexandr Mischenko received copies of the credentials of the Philippine Ambassador Alan Deniega to formally begin of his diplomatic mission in Ukraine.

== Agreements ==
The Philippines and Ukraine have seven bilateral agreements in place:

- An exchange of letters between the Ministry of Foreign Affairs of Ukraine and the Department of Foreign Affairs of the Philippines (entered into force 7 April 1992).
- A memorandum on cooperation between the Verkhovna Rada and the Philippine House of Representatives (14 April 1997).
- A protocol on political consultations between their respective Foreign Affairs bodies (14 July 2003).
- A memorandum between the State Committee of Financial Monitoring of Ukraine and the Financial Surveillance Body of the Philippines to exchange financial information regarding money laundering (12 March 2008).
- An agreement between the Council of Ministers of Crimea and the Government of Cebu Province about trade, economic, scientific, technical and cultural cooperation (26 November 2010).
- A memorandum on cooperation between the Diplomatic Academy of Ukraine and the Foreign Service Institute of the Philippines (6 December 2010).

== Economic relations ==
Bilateral trade between Ukraine and the Philippines amounted to $20.21 million in a six-month period in 2012. The Philippine negative trade balance for the same period amounted to $15.59 million. Among Ukraine's mains export to the Philippines during the period are feed wheat, coloring materials, machinery for metal stamping, forging, bending, alignment, cutting, press, whey, and ammonia.

The Philippines imports from Ukraine during the same six month in 2012 amounted to $17.90 million. Among the Philippines main import from Ukraine are electrical products, electronic integrated circuits and electronic micro modules. Among the Philippines main export to Ukraine are bells, gongs, statuettes, frames and mirrors, of base metal, printing equipment, printing machines, auxiliary machine for printing, automatic data processing machines and units thereof and tobacco products.

== See also ==
- Foreign relations of the Philippines
- Foreign relations of Ukraine
