= The Gambia–Philippines relations =

- Gambia: Philippines

The Gambia–Philippines relations refers to the bilateral relations between The Gambia and the Philippines. The Philippines has a consulate in Banjul and The Gambia has a consulate in Manila.

== History ==
Formal relations between The Gambia and the Philippines were established on March 3, 1949. From June 20 to 24, 2005, Gambian President Yahya Jammeh, made a state visit to the Philippines and had bilateral talks with the Philippine President Gloria Macapagal Arroyo. President Jammeh expressed support and advocated for the Philippines bid to the Organisation of Islamic Cooperation (OIC). The Gambian president also proposed to Arroyo a joint oil exploration following the recent discovery of oil in his country. Jammeh offered one block out of the five oil deposits in the Gambia to the Philippines to be developed in the proposed joint oil exploration. The Philippines agreed to conduct a joint oil exploration with the Gambia. The agreement was said to be the fruits of the New Asian–African Strategic Partnership signed by both countries in Jakarta. The Philippine National Oil Company subsequently said that the first 5 blocks offered did not show much potential, but that they were interested in the sixth block.

The Gambia also wanted to reciprocate the Philippines previous aid to the Gambia in 1966. Filipino agriculture expert, Professor Brooke, introduced the "Philippine Pink" peanut variety in 1966. The peanut variety is the top export product of The Gambia.

== Agreements ==
The two countries has signed agreements on scientific and technical cooperation in 1996 and on cooperation in health and medicine in 1999.

== Cooperation ==
As of 2007 the consulates of both countries were working to establish distribution centers in these cities to facilitate trade.

== Resident diplomatic missions ==
- The Gambia is accredited to the Philippines from its embassy in Beijing, China.
- The Philippines is accredited to the Gambia from its embassy in Abuja, Nigeria.

== See also ==
- Foreign relations of the Gambia
- Foreign relations of the Philippines
