= Mongolia–Philippines relations =

- Mongolia: Philippines

Mongolia–Philippines relations refers to the diplomatic and cultural relations between Mongolia and the Philippines.

Relations between Mongolia and the Philippines were established on October 11, 1973. The Philippines is accredited to Mongolia through its embassy in Beijing, China, while Mongolia is accredited to the Philippines through its embassy in Jakarta, Indonesia.

== History ==
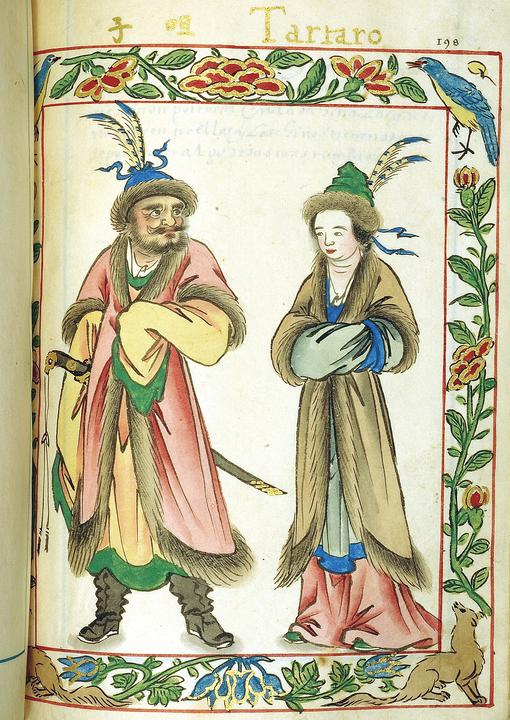
Mongol Tartar couple found in the Philippines, c. 1590 via Boxer Codex

Mongols have been found in the Philippines even in the early Spanish colonial period of the Philippines. A Mongol couple labeled "Tarraro 呾子" from Tartar is depicted in the Boxer Codex, circa 1590.

== State visits ==
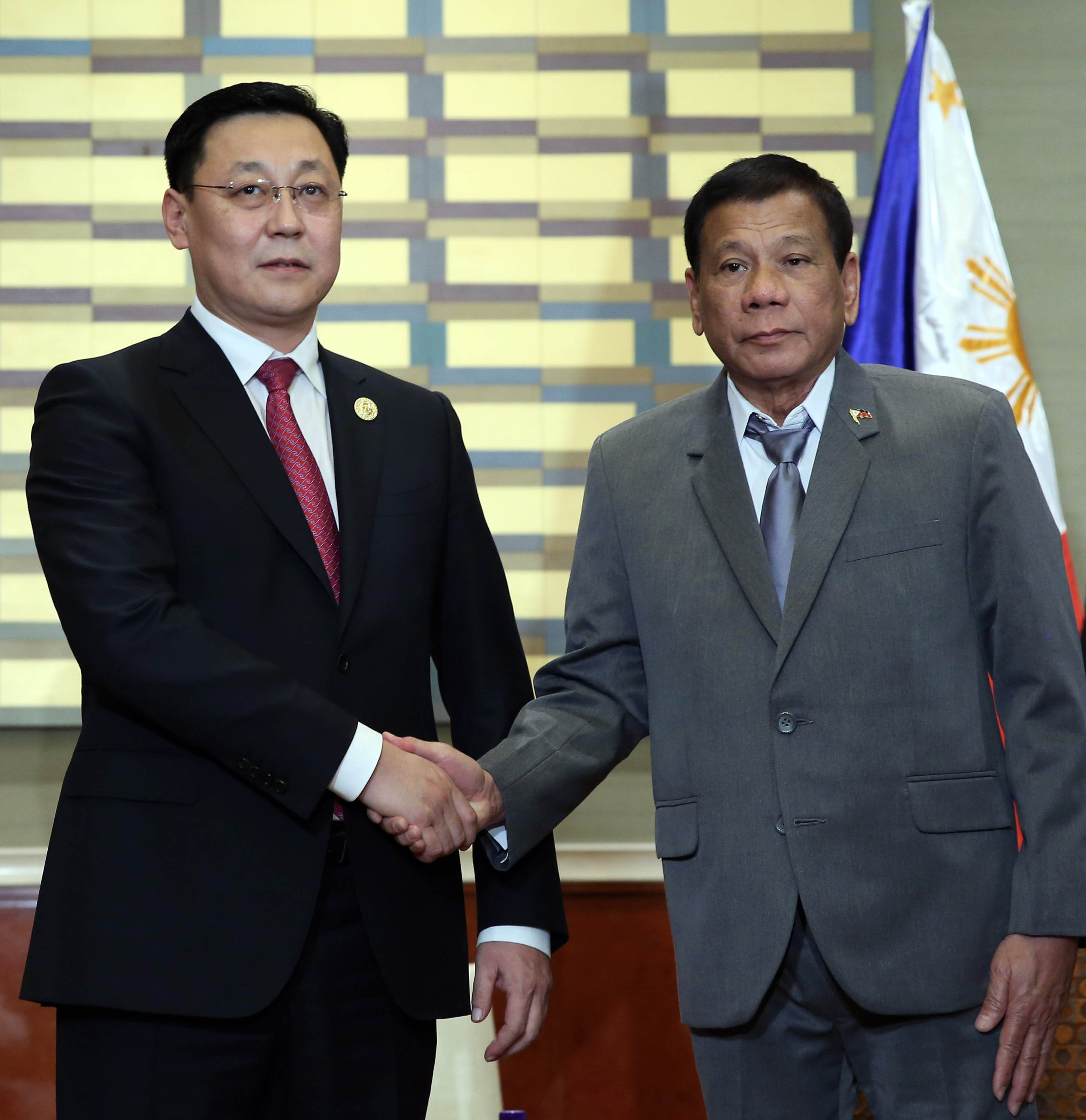
Mongolia Prime Minister Jargaltulgyn Erdenebat meets with Philippine President Rodrigo Duterte in Beijing, China. May 2017

Mongolian President Natsagiin Bagabandi made a state visit to the Philippines from September 1–4, 2000, the first Mongolian head of state to visit the Philippines.

== Economic relations ==
Trade relations were established when a partnership agreement was signed by the Philippine Chamber of Commerce and Industry and the Mongolian National Chamber of Commerce and Industry as announced on a statement on September 14, 2012. The agreement provides for the promotion of trade relations, exchange of information, strengthening business contacts as well as the establishment of a Philippine-Mongolia Business Council.

The 1st Policy Consultation between the two countries was held in Manila on March 19, 2013. The two countries agreed to strengthen ties. It was agreed to increase cooperation in various fields which include trade and investment, labor tourism, culture and sports.

On July 9, 2009, Mongolian businessman, Bekhbat Sodnom was sworn in as the first honorary consul to Mongolia.

== Migration ==
The Mongolian Immigration Agency, launched a campaign to register Filipinos illegally residing in Mongolia from July 1 to August 1, 2013. There are 441 Filipinos registered in Mongolia as of July 2013.

== Resident diplomatic missions ==
- Mongolia is accredited to the Philippines from its embassy in Jakarta, Indonesia.
- The Philippines is accredited to Mongolia from its embassy in Beijing, China.

== See also ==
- Foreign relations of Mongolia
- Foreign relations of the Philippines
