= Nauru–Philippines relations =

- Nauru: Philippines

Diplomatic mission
- Embassy of the Philippines, Canberra (Australia)

Nauru–Philippines relations are the bilateral relations between Nauru and Philippines. The Philippines maintains relations with Nauru through its embassy in Canberra, Australia

Formal diplomatic relations between the two countries were established on February 19, 1968.

== Economic relations ==
The Pacific Star Building, one of the Nauru government's investments in the Philippines.

Through the Nauru Phosphate Royalties Trust, Nauru invested in the Philippines and built the Manila Pacific Star Hotel, however the hotel suffered heavy losses. Nauru and the Philippines made a joint venture in the phosphate industry and raw phosphate from Nauru was processed in plants built in the Philippines. $35 million was invested in the joint venture, which Nauru later claimed to amount to $60 million by 1997. The venture suffered a loss amounting to $1.2 billion.

== State visits ==
Nauru President Hammer DeRoburt made state visits to the Philippines. His first official visit was from November 22–23, 1978. He later made visits on May 1 and August 29, 1980. De Roburt discussed with Philippine President Ferdinand Marcos prospects for cooperation between Nauru and the Philippines on areas of agriculture, fertilizers, fishing shipping and housing. On his August 29 visit he held talks to finalize an agreement on the supply of raw phosphates which was estimated to worth $20 million at that time for the next ten years.

== Others ==
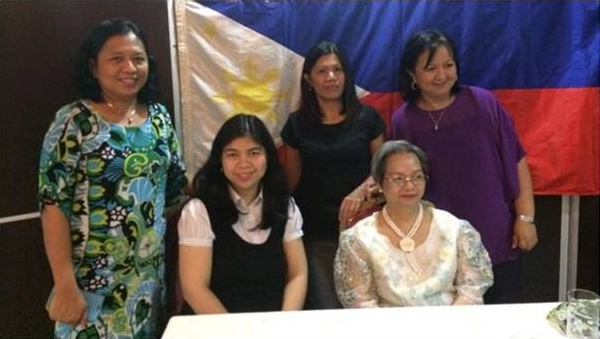
Members of the Filipino community in Nauru

There are estimated to be around 65 Filipinos living in Nauru.

During the term of Nauru President Hammer DeRoburt, Nauru negotiated with numerous countries in the Pacific to purchase an island for its citizens to move on when the phosphate in the island state runs out. One of the countries Nauru negotiated with was the Philippines. The Philippines was reported not to be interested on the idea.

== See also ==
- Philippine Phosphate Fertilizer Corporation
