= Philippines–South Sudan relations =

Philippines–South Sudanese relations

- Philippines: South Sudan

Philippines–South Sudan relations refers to the bilateral relationship between the Philippines and South Sudan. The Philippines recognized South Sudan as a sovereign state nearly a month after it declared its independence on 9 July 2011. The Philippine embassy in Nairobi has jurisdiction over South Sudan since March 2013. This was held previously by the Philippine embassy in Cairo.

== History ==
The Philippines officially recognized South Sudan as a sovereign and independent state soon after South Sudan declared its independence on July 9, 2011. The Philippines and South Sudan established diplomatic relations through a Joint Communiqué signed by Philippine and South Sudanese ambassadors to Kenya, Domingo Lucenario Jr. and Majok Guandong Thiep at the United Nations Office at Nairobi on 13 March 2013. In a statement, Lucenario said the formal establishment of relations between the Philippines and South Sudan will be mutually beneficial "because [the two countries] would now be able to intensify relations in various common areas of cooperation.” The two ambassadors also discussed the need to establish a Joint Commission on Bilateral Cooperation to identify various areas of cooperation to benefit the peoples of the Philippines and South Sudan.

On April 13, 2016, President Salva Kiir of South Sudan accepted the credentials of Non-Resident Philippine Ambassador Bayani V. Mangibin.

On 14 June 2023, President Salva Kiir of South Sudan accepted the credentials of the first female Non-Resident Philippine Ambassador to South Sudan Marie Charlotte G. Tang coinciding with the 10th anniversary of Philippines-South Sudan diplomatic relations and the 125th anniversary of declaration of Philippine independence.

== Migrant workers ==
There are more than 300 Overseas Filipinos working in South Sudan. On 13 January 2012, the Philippine Overseas Employment Administration banned the deployment of Filipino workers to South Sudan due to the escalation of inter-ethnic violence in the country's Jonglei State. The ban was lifted two months later (on 22 March 2012) as the political and security situation in South Sudan improved.

The deployment ban was reinstated during the South Sudanese Civil War which remained in place until 2021.

== Peacekeeping ==
The Philippine National Police has been sending contingents to the United Nations Mission in South Sudan since its independence.

== See also ==
- Foreign relations of the Philippines
- Foreign relations of South Sudan
