= Oman–Philippines relations =

- Oman: Philippines

Oman–Philippines relations refers to the bilateral relations between Oman and the Philippines. Diplomatic relations between Oman and the Philippines were established on October 6, 1980. The Philippine embassy in Riyadh covered Oman until March 1992 when the Philippines established a resident embassy in Muscat. Oman's embassy in Kuala Lumpur covered the Philippines until the opening of the Omani embassy in Manila in July 2013.

== History ==
Relations between Oman and the Philippines were established in October 1980, with a resident Philippine embassy being established in March 1992 as a result of the growing number of overseas workers in Oman.

In 2025, relations between the two countries were bolstered amid conflict in the Middle East, with Philippine President Bongbong Marcos thanking the Omani government for facilitating the release of 26 Filipino seafarers taken hostage by the Houthis. Marcos also expressed intent to work more closely with the Omani government, "especially in areas that matter to Filipinos".

== Filipinos in Oman ==
In the 2011 list of countries considered safe for Overseas Filipino Workers (OFW) by Philippine Overseas Employment Administration (POEA), Oman was the only Middle Eastern country on the list As of 2013, there are about 40,000 Filipinos working in Oman. In 2012 according to POEA, the number of OFW's deployed to Oman amounted to 15,868, 10,291 rehires and 5,577 new hires.

== Transport ==
Oman Air operates direct flights between Muscat and Manila.

== See also ==
- Foreign relations of Oman
- Foreign relations of the Philippines
