= Denmark–Philippines relations =

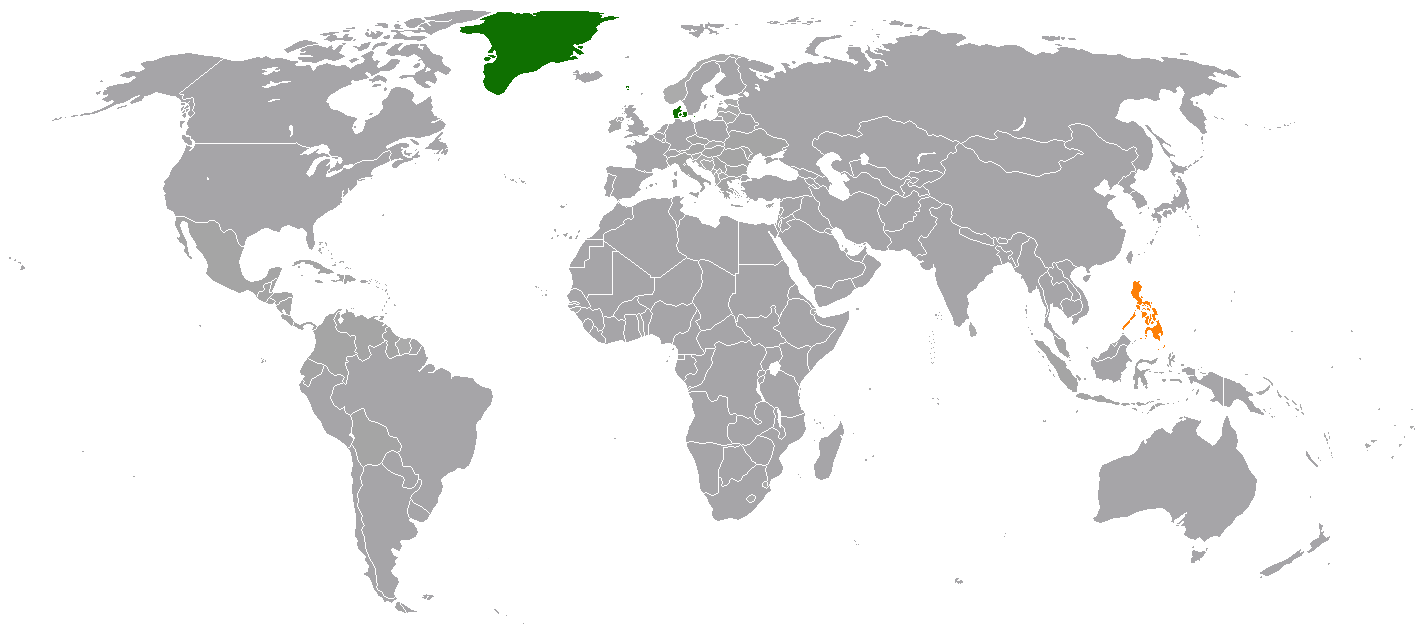

- Denmark: Philippines

Denmark–Philippines relations refer to the bilateral relations between Denmark and the Philippines. Denmark has an embassy in Manila, and the Philippines has an embassy in Copenhagen.

Diplomatic relations are described as strong, close, cordial and friendly. The Philippines called Denmark a significant ally in its renewable energy resources and wind energy. The Philippines enjoys strong maritime relations with Denmark.

In February 2006, Muslims in the Philippines protested and burned the flag of Denmark to condemn the Jyllands-Posten Muhammad cartoons controversy.

In 2014 Denmark reopened its embassy in the Philippines, after having been closed since 2002.

== History ==
Diplomatic relations were established on 28 September 1946 and the United Kingdom was responsible for the relations with Denmark.

Since 1976, the Philippines has maintained an envoy in Sweden, that maintained diplomatic links with Denmark and the other Nordic and Baltic countries. In 2002, Denmark decided to close her embassy in the Philippines because of financial reasons, but it was reopened in 2014. The Philippine Embassy in Copenhagen, meanwhile, opened on January 14, 2019.

== Assistance ==
In 1993, Denmark granted the Philippines 14.910 million DKK for the establishment of a River Rehabilitation Secretariat which will improve the environment of the Philippines. The Danish International Development Agency used 16 million DKK for handicapped children and young people in Philippines. Denmark assisted with 300,000 DKK for the floodings during Tropical Storm Washi which killed about 1,000 people.

== Trade, agreements and economic cooperation ==
In 1954 notes, expressing intent to enter into negotiations for a formal agreement on air arrangement, were exchanged. Between 1970 and 1972, Philippines exported $8.8 million worth of products to Denmark. Most of the Filipino export consisted of machinery and manufactured products. The Philippines also wanted to export finished garments, canned fruits, juice, wood products, timber and other raw materials to Denmark in the future. During the first half of 2008, more than $43 million worth of goods was traded between Denmark and the Philippines. In 2009, Danish exports to the Philippines amounted 500.9 million DKK while the Philippine exports to Denmark amounted 306.8 million DKK.

In 2005, with help from Danish International Development Agency, a wind farm was established in Cagayan. In 2010, The Philippine Northwind Power Development Corp developed the wind farm, with help from Danish investors. The turbine materials was also shipped from Denmark.

Year	Total trade
2003	75,125,119 US dollars
2004	69,065,811 US dollars
2005	47,946,184 US dollars
2006	79,112,649 US dollars
2007	9,880,970 US dollars
2008	146,150,557 US dollars

== See also ==
- Foreign relations of Denmark
- Foreign relations of the Philippines
- Philippines-EU relations
- ASEAN-EU relations
