= Armenia–Philippines relations =

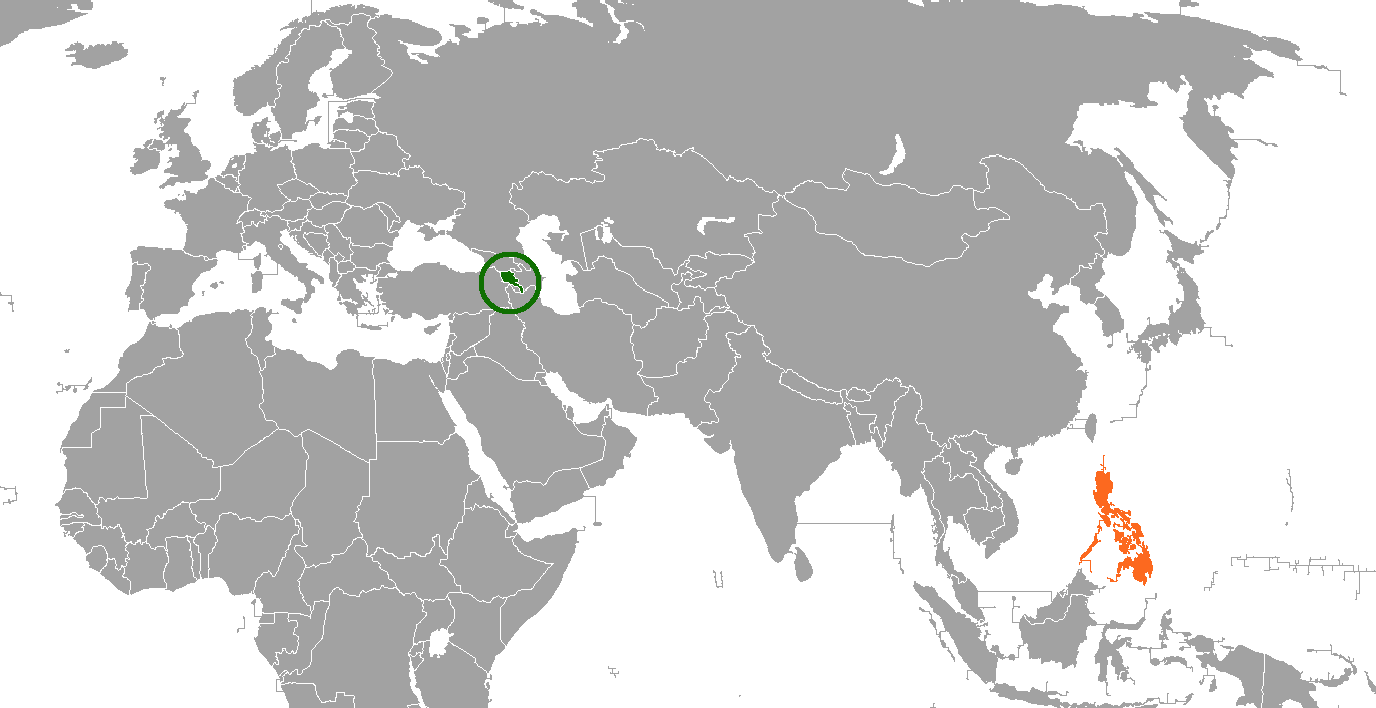

- Armenia: Philippines

Bilateral relations exist between Armenia and the Philippines. Relations between the two countries have gradually improved since it was established on May 20, 1992, following the collapse of the Soviet Union.

Foreign Minister Eduard Nalbandyan visited the Philippines in 2012, making him the highest Armenian government official to ever visit the Philippines to date. Armenian-Philippine relations were further strengthened upon the visit of Armenian non-resident ambassador Raisa Vardanyan to Foreign Affairs Secretary Albert del Rosario on March 19, 2015. The most recent diplomatic engagement involved commitment to increase trade, investment and educational and scientific cooperation between the two countries.

Both countries currently have non-resident ambassadors. The Armenian ambassador is accredited to Manila from Hanoi while the Philippine ambassador is accredited to Yerevan from Moscow.

Historically, Armenians played a significant role in commerce and trade in the Philippines. Jesuit priest Murillo Velarde noted that the Armenians along with other Orthodox Christians had presence in Manila as early as 1618. In 18th century, Armenians in Manila some of which came from Madras in India where a major Armenian community is present, facilitated trade between the Philippine islands and India.

== Trade and economic relations ==
=== Trade turnover (thous. US dollars) ===
Year	Exports	Imports
2012	39.0	2275.8
2013	68.1	1861.7
2014	8.1	2032.5

The data in the chart above shows that the trade volume between Armenia and the Philippines from 2012 to 2014.

== Migration ==
According to the Philippine Embassy in Moscow, there are at least 300 Filipinos settling in Yerevan, the capital city of Armenia but only 70 are registered with the embassy in 2018. The number of Filipino tourists in Armenia also increased from 674 in 2014 to 22,007 in 2017, according to the country's Tourism Committee.

In the Philippines, Armenian tourists arrivals also increased from only 84 in 2012 to more than 100 in 2016.

== Diplomatic missions ==
- Armenia is accredited to Philippines from its embassy in Hanoi, Vietnam.
- Philippines is accredited to Armenia from its embassy in Moscow, Russia and maintains an honorary consulate in Yerevan.

== See also ==
- Foreign relations of Armenia
- Foreign relations of the Philippines
