= Lithuania–Philippines relations =

- Lithuania: Philippines

Lithuania–Philippines relations refers to the bilateral relations between Lithuania and the Philippines. Lithuania has a non-resident ambassador in Seoul. The Philippines has a non-resident ambassador in Warsaw.

== History ==
The Philippines recognized Lithuania's independence from the Soviet Union on December 15, 1991. On December 15 of the same year, formal diplomatic relations were established between the two countries.

In 2023, both countries committed to improve ties. Gabrielius Landsbergis made an official visit to the Philippines in April 2024, marking the first time that a Lithuanian foreign minister to do so. Landsbergis expressed support for the Philippines in regards to the South China Sea dispute issue. On June 30, 2025, a "strategic-level" partnership was established in regards to defense.

== Security relations ==
Lithuania has framed its relationship with the Philippines as small nations having shared experience of pressures from "authoritarian states" like Russia and China. Filipino defense secretary Gilbert Teodoro has suggested the possibility of a visiting forces agreement (VFA) involving Lithuania and the Philippines. Lithuania has supported the Philippines when it comes to the South China Sea Arbitration ruling.

== Cultural relations ==
=== Sports ===
The Samahang Basketbol ng Pilipinas (SBP) and the Lithuanian Basketball Federation (LKF) signed a memorandum of agreement in 2024 where the latter will assist the former on basketball coaches and national teams training.

== Immigration to Lithuania ==
There are 774 Filipinos with residency permits in Lithuania as of January 1, 2025.

== Resident diplomatic missions ==
- Lithuania is accredited to the Philippines from its embassy in Seoul, South Korea.
- the Philippines is accredited to Lithuania from its embassy in Warsaw, Poland.

== See also ==
- Foreign relations of Lithuania
- Foreign relations of the Philippines
