= Foreign relations of the Philippines =

The foreign relations of the Philippines are administered by the President of the Philippines and the Department of Foreign Affairs. Philippine international affairs are influenced by ties to its Southeast Asian neighbors, China, the United States, and the Middle East.

The Philippines is a founding member of the United Nations; an elected member of the Security Council and participant in the Food and Agriculture Organization (FAO), International Labour Organization (ILO), UNESCO, and the World Health Organization (WHO). Like most nations, the Philippines is a signatory of Interpol. The Philippines is a member of the Association of Southeast Asian Nations, East Asia Summit and Association of Caribbean States (as an observer). It was formerly a member of the now-defunct Latin Union and the SEATO. Declaring itself as independent of any major power block of nations, the Philippines is a member of the Non-Aligned Movement.

Economically, the Philippines is a participant in the Asia-Pacific Economic Cooperation, Asian Development Bank, the Colombo Plan, Group of 24, G-20, G-77, the World Bank, Next Eleven and the World Trade Organization (WTO).

Trust rating of Three countries, July 2020
| Country | Much trust | Undecided | Little trust | M-L |
|---|---|---|---|---|
| United States | 60 | 19 | 18 | +42 |
| Australia | 49 | 25 | 22 | +27 |
| China | 22 | 18 | 58 | -36 |

== Foreign policy ==
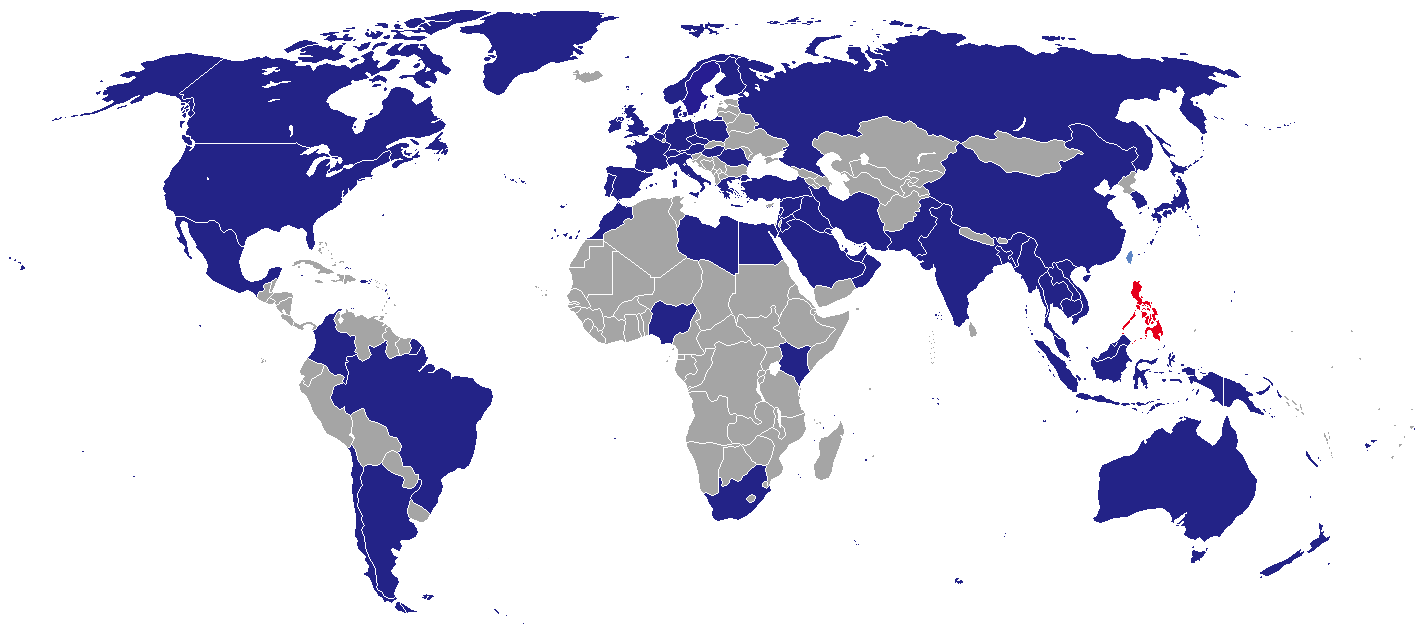
The Philippines (in red) has embassies in various nations (in blue).

Philippine foreign policy is based on the advancement of Filipino ideals and values, which include the advancement of democracy and advocacy for human rights worldwide.

The Philippines actively engages with regional neighbors in Southeast Asia through the Association of Southeast Asian Nations (as a founding member) with the intention of strengthening regional harmony, stability, and prosperity. It has been a supporter of East Timor since the latter's independence and has expanded trade links with its traditional allies Indonesia, Malaysia, Singapore, and Thailand. Relations with Vietnam and Cambodia have thawed in the 1990s after their entry into the ASEAN.

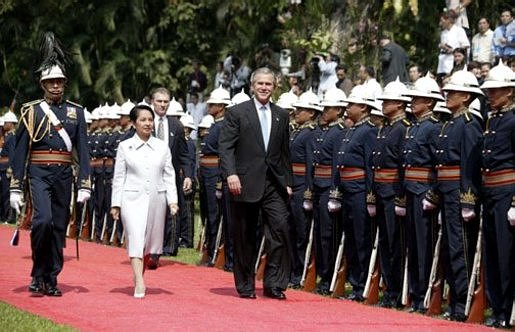
President Gloria Macapagal Arroyo and President George W. Bush

The Republic of the Philippines considers itself a staunch ally of the United States and has supported many points of American foreign policy. This is evident in the Philippines' participation in the Iraq War and the war on terror. Speaking to this support, U.S. President George W. Bush praised the Philippines as a bastion of democracy in the East and called the Philippines America's oldest ally in Asia. President Bush's speech on October 18, 2003, was only the second U.S. presidential address to the Philippine Congress; U.S. President Dwight D. Eisenhower delivered the first.

With a robust relationship to the United States, the administration of former President Gloria Macapagal Arroyo sought to establish closer ties to its earlier colonizer, Spain. This was inspired by the attendance of King Juan Carlos and Queen Sofía at the June 12, 1998 celebration honoring the centennial of the Philippines' independence from Spain. President Macapagal-Arroyo made two official visits to Spain during her presidency.

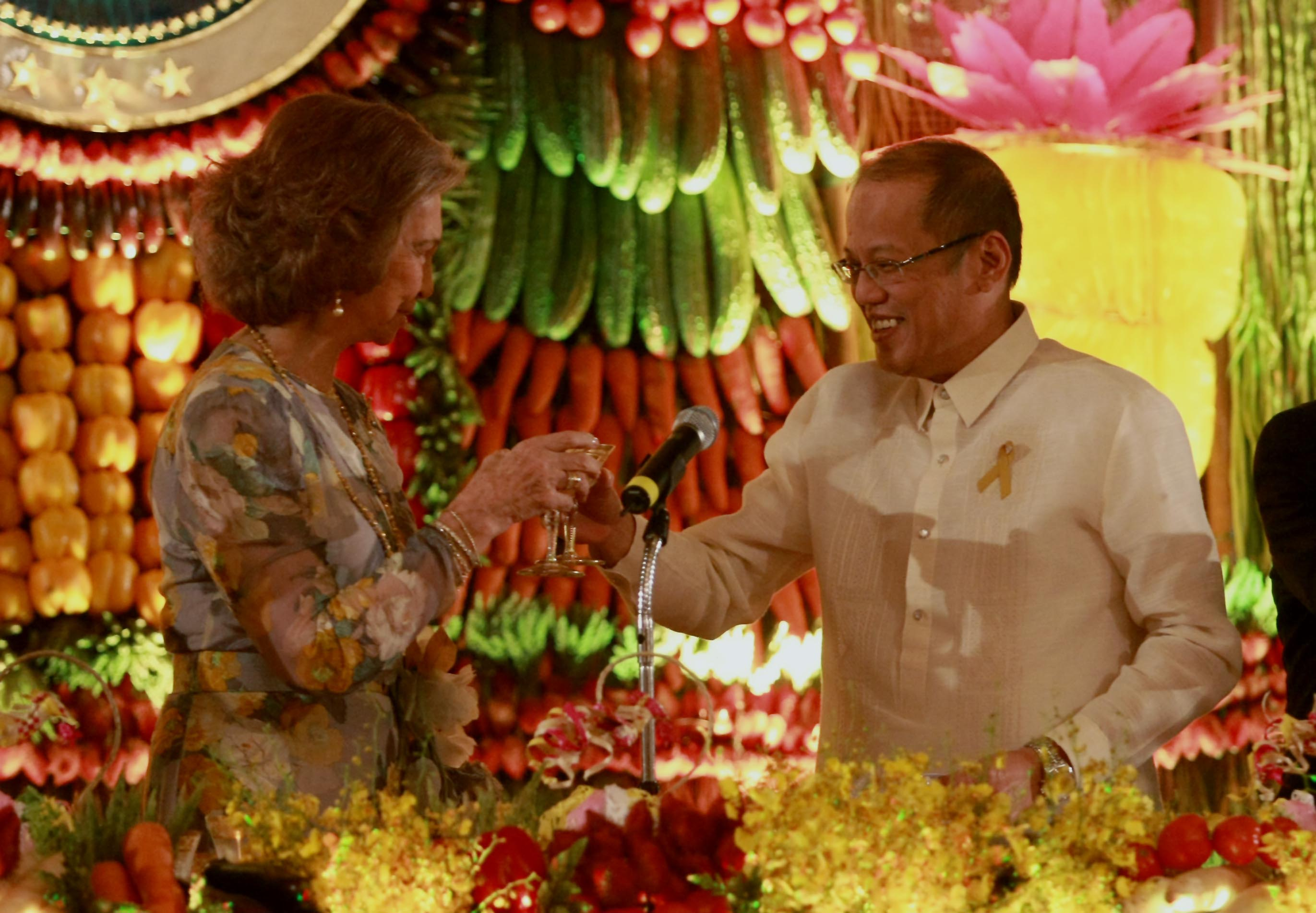
President Aquino with Queen Sofía of Spain in her visit to the Philippines

In recent years, the Philippines attaches great importance in its relations with China, and has established significant cooperation with the country.

The Armed Forces of the Philippines has participated in various regional conflicts, including the Korean War and the Vietnam War. Recently, the Philippines sent peacekeeping forces to Iraq, in addition to civilian doctors, nurses and police. The Filipino mission was later recalled as collateral for the release of a Filipino hostage. As part of a UN peacekeeping operation, Philippine Army General Jaime de los Santos became the first commander of troops responsible for maintaining order in East Timor.

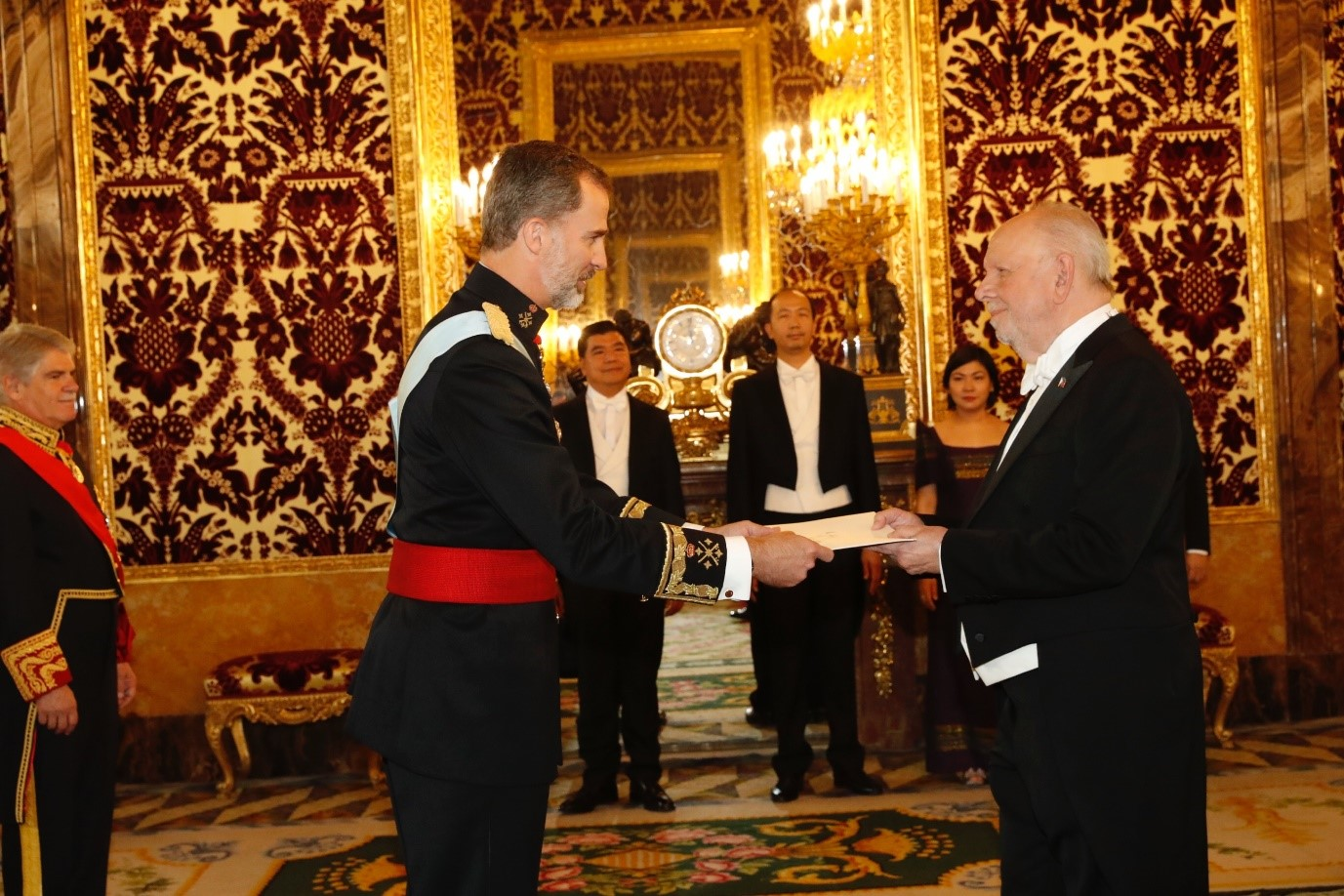
Filipino Ambassador Philippe Jones Lhuillier, presents his Credentials to King Felipe VI of Spain at the Royal Palace of Madrid.

The Philippines is in tension with rival international claimants to various land and water territories in the South China Sea. The Philippines is currently in dispute with the People's Republic of China over the Camago and Malampaya gas fields. The two countries are also in dispute over the Scarborough Shoal. Additionally, the Philippines has a disputed claim over the Spratly Islands.

The Philippines maintains strategic partnerships with Australia, India, Japan, South Korea, United States, and Vietnam.

=== Recruitment of Foreign Service Officers ===
The Department of Foreign Affairs in cooperation with the Civil Service Commission conducts an annual recruitment of would-be career diplomats called Foreign Service Officer Examination (FSOE). With application deadlines typically falling on October or November, it is a sequential series of written (initial - typically held late January of early February, second - essay types on various topics related to Philosophy, Politics, Economics, history, diplomacy, foreign policy typically on middle of a calendar year), psychological and oral (debates, impromptu speeches) examinations typically done over a period of several months to over a year. An initial interview around April, months after the initial written examination seems to have been removed from the proces as of the 2025 cycle. Some quarters say that it is one if not the most difficult eligibility examination in the country, even harder than the Bar Exam that there would be years where no one among the initial applicants passed all the way through the conclusion of an annual cycle. The initial criteria for eligibility isn't that stringent - an applicant only has to have a/any Bachelor's degree and had worked/be formally employed for at least two years. Successful applicants enter the government service as "Foreign Service Officer Class IV" with a starting base pay of approximately PHP 85,000 as of 2025 .

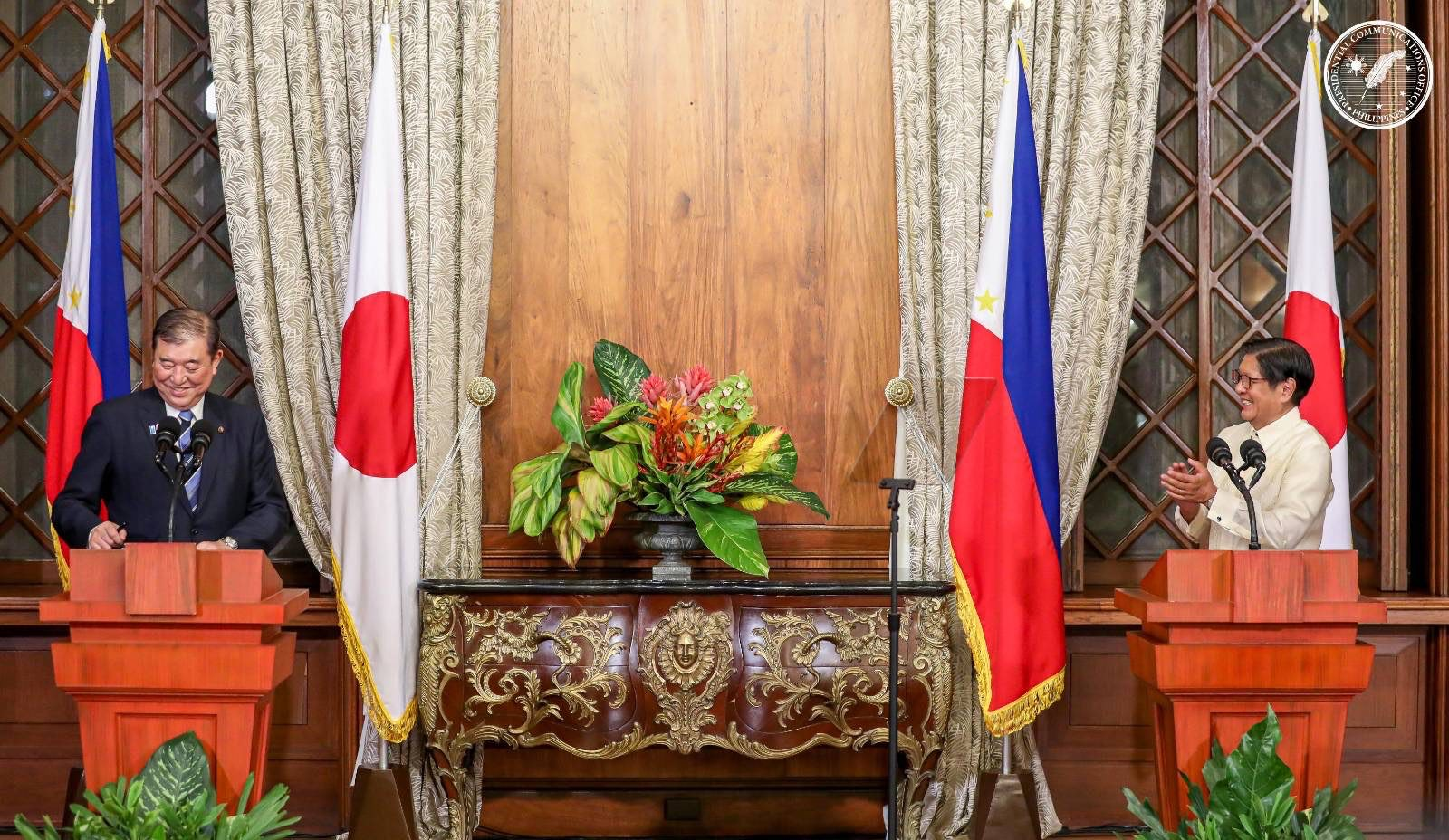
The Japanese Prime Minister Shigeru Ishiba and the Philippine President Bongbong Marcos in Manila.

For the 2024-2025 cycle, the Department held a 2nd cycle of recruitment with an earlier than normal deadline of September 18 2025 - for those who already passed the written exam (even from years prior - as the eligibility is forever*) and perhaps failed &/or did not push through with the succeeding parts.

*Except if revoked for the putative reasons of "moral turpitude", fraud on the application, or for cause when already entered the service.

== Diplomatic relations ==
List of countries which the Philippines maintains diplomatic relations with:

| # | Country | Date |
|---|---|---|
| 1 | Egypt | 3 March 1946 |
| 2 | Australia | 4 July 1946 |
| 3 | Belgium | 4 July 1946 |
| 4 | Brazil | 4 July 1946 |
| 5 | Cuba | 4 July 1946 |
| 6 | El Salvador | 4 July 1946 |
| 7 | Portugal | 4 July 1946 |
| 8 | United Kingdom | 4 July 1946 |
| 9 | United States | 4 July 1946 |
| 10 | Colombia | 5 July 1946 |
| 11 | Costa Rica | 5 July 1946 |
| 12 | Honduras | 5 July 1946 |
| 13 | Haiti | 6 July 1946 |
| 14 | Luxembourg | 26 August 1946 |
| 15 | Syria | 4 September 1946 |
| 16 | Denmark | 28 September 1946 |
| 17 | Austria | 17 October 1946 |
| 18 | Lebanon | 24 October 1946 |
| 19 | Italy | 3 November 1946 |
| 20 | Sweden | 17 January 1947 |
| 21 | Netherlands | 23 May 1947 |
| 22 | France | 26 June 1947 |
| 23 | Spain | 27 September 1947 |
| 24 | Norway | 2 March 1948 |
| 25 | South Korea | 3 March 1949 |
| 26 | Argentina | 27 August 1948 |
| 27 | Turkey | 13 June 1949 |
| 28 | Thailand | 14 June 1949 |
| 29 | Pakistan | 8 September 1949 |
| 30 | India | 16 November 1949 |
| 31 | Indonesia | 24 November 1949 |
| 32 | Canada | 4 December 1949 |
| 33 | Greece | 28 August 1950 |
| — | Holy See | 8 April 1951 |
| 34 | Mexico | 14 April 1953 |
| 35 | Dominican Republic | 9 May 1953 |
| 36 | Germany | 8 October 1954 |
| 37 | Laos | 14 January 1955 |
| 38 | Finland | 14 July 1955 |
| 39 | Japan | 23 July 1956 |
| 40 | Myanmar | 30 July 1956 |
| 41 | Ghana | 6 March 1957 |
| 42 | Israel | 9 August 1957 |
| 43 | Cambodia | 30 August 1957 |
| 44 | Switzerland | 30 August 1957 |
| 45 | Nepal | 12 February 1960 |
| 46 | Chad | 22 September 1960 |
| 47 | Sri Lanka | 11 January 1961 |
| 48 | Cameroon | 11 December 1961 |
| 49 | Tanzania | 15 December 1961 |
| 50 | Chile | 17 July 1962 |
| 51 | Nigeria | 1 August 1962 |
| 52 | Paraguay | 12 December 1962 |
| 53 | Iran | 22 January 1964 |
| 54 | Malaysia | 18 May 1964 |
| — | Sovereign Military Order of Malta | 24 April 1965 |
| 55 | Zambia | 27 February 1965 |
| 56 | New Zealand | 6 July 1966 |
| 57 | Botswana | 6 February 1967 |
| 58 | Nauru | 20 February 1968 |
| 59 | Venezuela | 27 August 1968 |
| 60 | Afghanistan | 17 September 1968 |
| 61 | Equatorial Guinea | 28 November 1968 |
| 62 | Singapore | 16 May 1969 |
| 63 | Saudi Arabia | 24 October 1969 |
| 64 | Bolivia | 7 January 1970 |
| 65 | Bangladesh | 24 February 1972 |
| 66 | Romania | 28 February 1972 |
| 67 | Serbia | 28 February 1972 |
| 68 | Guatemala | 21 June 1972 |
| 69 | Nicaragua | 10 August 1973 |
| 70 | Poland | 22 September 1973 |
| 71 | Hungary | 28 September 1973 |
| 72 | Panama | 28 September 1973 |
| 73 | Czech Republic | 5 October 1973 |
| 74 | Mongolia | 11 October 1973 |
| 75 | Bulgaria | 16 November 1973 |
| 76 | Fiji | 18 December 1973 |
| 77 | Maldives | 12 July 1974 |
| 78 | United Arab Emirates | 19 August 1974 |
| 79 | Peru | 30 November 1974 |
| 80 | Iraq | 12 January 1975 |
| 81 | Algeria | 10 April 1975 |
| 82 | Morocco | 10 April 1975 |
| 83 | China | 9 June 1975 |
| 84 | Kenya | 4 July 1975 |
| 85 | Papua New Guinea | 16 September 1975 |
| 86 | Tunisia | 15 December 1975 |
| 87 | Uruguay | 29 December 1975 |
| 88 | Jordan | 1 March 1976 |
| 89 | Sudan | 7 March 1976 |
| 90 | Senegal | 15 March 1976 |
| 91 | Somalia | 20 April 1976 |
| 92 | Central African Republic | 2 June 1976 |
| 93 | Russia | 2 June 1976 |
| 94 | Bahamas | 1 July 1976 |
| 95 | Liberia | 4 July 1976 |
| 96 | Ecuador | 5 July 1976 |
| 97 | Gabon | 6 July 1976 |
| 98 | Vietnam | 12 July 1976 |
| 99 | Libya | 17 November 1976 |
| 100 | Ethiopia | 7 February 1977 |
| 101 | Yemen | 4 May 1977 |
| 102 | Samoa | 1 June 1977 |
| 103 | Malta | 9 June 1977 |
| 104 | Guinea-Bissau | 27 October 1977 |
| 105 | Bahrain | 27 November 1978 |
| 106 | Kuwait | 18 January 1979 |
| 107 | Cyprus | 6 March 1980 |
| 108 | Zimbabwe | 18 April 1980 |
| 109 | Jamaica | 15 May 1980 |
| 110 | Oman | 6 October 1980 |
| 111 | Guinea | 25 December 1980 |
| 112 | Qatar | 5 May 1981 |
| 113 | Tonga | 1 July 1981 |
| 114 | Niger | 16 October 1981 |
| 115 | Rwanda | 15 December 1982 |
| 116 | Brunei | 1 January 1984 |
| 117 | Ireland | 5 July 1984 |
| 118 | Vanuatu | 8 October 1986 |
| 119 | Albania | 11 June 1987 |
| 120 | Seychelles | 9 October 1987 |
| 121 | Marshall Islands | 15 September 1988 |
| 122 | Federated States of Micronesia | 10 January 1989 |
| — | State of Palestine | 4 September 1989 |
| 123 | Sierra Leone | 3 April 1991 |
| 124 | Lithuania | 15 December 1991 |
| 125 | Latvia | 17 December 1991 |
| 126 | Estonia | 19 December 1991 |
| 127 | Kazakhstan | 25 March 1992 |
| 128 | Tajikistan | 25 March 1992 |
| 129 | Azerbaijan | 27 March 1992 |
| 130 | Moldova | 30 March 1992 |
| 131 | Ukraine | 7 April 1992 |
| 132 | Uzbekistan | 13 April 1992 |
| 133 | Kyrgyzstan | 24 April 1992 |
| 134 | Armenia | 20 May 1992 |
| 135 | Georgia | 21 September 1992 |
| 136 | Slovakia | 1 January 1993 |
| 137 | Slovenia | 3 February 1993 |
| 138 | Eswatini | 19 February 1993 |
| 139 | Croatia | 25 February 1993 |
| 140 | Turkmenistan | 23 July 1993 |
| 141 | South Africa | 1 November 1993 |
| 142 | Ivory Coast | 22 March 1995 |
| 143 | Liechtenstein | 24 November 1995 |
| 144 | Namibia | 17 May 1996 |
| 145 | Belarus | 22 May 1996 |
| 146 | Gambia | 26 June 1996 |
| 147 | Eritrea | 4 February 1997 |
| 148 | Mozambique | 27 March 1997 |
| 149 | Palau | 15 July 1997 |
| 150 | Suriname | 16 December 1997 |
| 151 | Mauritius | 23 January 1998 |
| 152 | Djibouti | 16 February 1998 |
| 153 | Lesotho | 15 April 1998 |
| 154 | Iceland | 24 February 1999 |
| 155 | Benin | 3 January 2000 |
| 156 | Democratic Republic of the Congo | 9 January 2000 |
| 157 | Republic of the Congo | 19 January 2000 |
| 158 | Andorra | 22 February 2000 |
| 159 | Cape Verde | 21 March 2000 |
| 160 | Kiribati | 25 March 2000 |
| 161 | Trinidad and Tobago | 18 April 2000 |
| 162 | Belize | 4 May 2000 |
| 163 | North Korea | 12 July 2000 |
| 164 | Saint Kitts and Nevis | 11 August 2000 |
| 165 | Togo | 24 August 2000 |
| 166 | Saint Vincent and the Grenadines | 11 October 2000 |
| 167 | São Tomé and Príncipe | 8 November 2000 |
| 168 | Bosnia and Herzegovina | 12 January 2001 |
| 169 | Malawi | 3 May 2001 |
| 170 | Angola | 14 September 2001 |
| 171 | Timor-Leste | 20 May 2002 |
| 172 | Tuvalu | 23 September 2002 |
| 173 | Burkina Faso | 10 October 2002 |
| 174 | San Marino | 3 April 2003 |
| 175 | Uganda | 12 December 2003 |
| 176 | Solomon Islands | 27 September 2004 |
| 177 | Monaco | 15 December 2006 |
| 178 | Guyana | 25 September 2008 |
| 179 | Barbados | 22 June 2009 |
| 180 | Montenegro | 26 September 2009 |
| 181 | Antigua and Barbuda | 16 July 2010 |
| 182 | Dominica | 29 April 2011 |
| 183 | Comoros | 25 November 2011 |
| — | Cook Islands | 12 December 2011 |
| 184 | South Sudan | 13 March 2013 |
| 185 | Mauritania | 30 September 2013 |
| 186 | Saint Lucia | 29 March 2016 |
| 187 | Burundi | 30 June 2017 |
| 188 | North Macedonia | 22 September 2021 |
| — | Niue | 27 September 2022 |
| 189 | Mali | 24 November 2022 |
| 190 | Madagascar | 4 February 2025 |
| 191 | Grenada | 8 May 2025 |
| 192 | Bhutan | 6 October 2025 |

== Bilateral relations ==
=== Asia ===
| Country | Formal relations began | Notes |
|---|---|---|
| Azerbaijan | March 27, 1992 | President of Azerbaijan Ilham Aliyev has received the credentials of the incoming Filipino ambassador to Azerbaijan, Marilyn Jusayan Alarilla. During a meeting following the ceremony, the ambassador conveyed Filipino President Benigno Aquino III's greetings to the Azerbaijani leader. She noted the Philippines was interested in developing the cooperation with Azerbaijan in different areas, including energy, science and technologies. Azerbaijani President Ilham Aliyev said there was potential for developing Azerbaijan–Philippines relations in many spheres, particularly the economic one. |
| Bahrain | January 1978 | Main article: Bahrain–Philippines relations |
| Bangladesh | February 24, 1972 | Main article: Bangladesh–Philippines relations |
| Bhutan | October 6, 2025 | Prior to the formalization of ties, numerous senators and high-profile dignitaries from the Philippines have visited Bhutan and have expressed their intentions to spread the Gross National Happiness doctrine in the Philippines, seeing it as an effective and efficient way to enhance nation-building, environmental conservation, cultural propagation, and human rights. In September 2014, the Prime Minister of Bhutan visited the Philippines and the Asian Development Bank headquarters in Manila. In 2014, officials of the Royal Government of Bhutan visited the Public-Private Partnership (PPP) Center of the Philippines to gain insights about the country's PPP Program. |
| Brunei | January 1, 1984 | Main article: Brunei–Philippines relations In April 2009, The Philippines and Brunei signed a Memorandum of Understanding (MOU) that sought to strengthen their bilateral cooperation in the fields of agricultural trade, innovation, and investments. The MOU further strengthening bilateral cooperation between the two Southeast Asian countries, particularly in the fields of agriculture and farm-related trade and investments. The two countries have agreed to cooperate in plant science, crops technology, vegetable and fruit preservation, biotechnology, post-harvest technology, livestock, organic agriculture, irrigation and water resources and halal industry. |
| Cambodia | August 1957 | Main article: Cambodia–Philippines relations |
| China | June 9, 1975 | Main article: China–Philippines relations See also: Hong Kong–Philippines relations |
| India | November 26, 1949 | Main article: India–Philippines relations |
| Indonesia | November 24, 1949 | Main article: Indonesia–Philippines relations |
| Iran | January 22, 1964 | Main article: Iran–Philippines relations |
| Iraq | January 12, 1975 | Main article: Iraq–Philippines relations |
| Israel | February 26, 1958 | Main article: Israel–Philippines relations The Philippines voted in favor of UN Resolution 181 concerning the partition of Palestine and the Creation of the State of Israel in 1947. The Philippines was among the 33 countries who supported the creation of Israel and the only Asian country which voted for the resolution. |
| Japan | July 23, 1956 | Main article: Japan–Philippines relations |
| Jordan | March 1, 1976 | The Philippines and Jordan agreed to establish formal diplomatic relations and to exchange ambassadors on March 1, 1976. |
| Kazakhstan | March 19, 1992 | Diplomatic relations between Kazakhstan and the Philippines were formally established on March 19, 1992. The Philippines maintains relations with Kazakhstan through its embassy in Russia. Kazakhstan has an honorary consulate in Manila. Trade between Kazakhstan and the Philippines amounted to 7.3 million U.S. dollars during the period from January to November 2010. In 2009, about 1,500 Kazakh tourists visited the Philippines. As of 2009, there are about 7,000 Overseas Filipino Workers who are working in Western Kazakhstan, mostly in the oil and gas sector. Kazakhstan is seeking Filipino investment in its economy. On 2011, Kazakhstan was planning to put up a Kazakh house in the Philippines in either Bonifacio Global City or Makati to showcase Kazakh products and promote its tourist destinations. There were also plans to put up a Philippine House in Kazakhstan for the same purpose and to put Filipino art exhibits in Kazakhstan. Kazakh President Nursultan Nazarbayev, and his 27 delegates arrived in the Philippines for a three-day state visit on November 10, 2003, at Villamor Air Base in Pasay. The Kazakh officials met with their Filipino counterparts and conducted meetings. Former Philippine President Gloria Macapagal Arroyo met with Nazarbayev to finalize the Philippines' intent to import oil and coal from Kazakhstan and discussed possible infrastructure projects in the Central Asian country. The Philippines also supported Kazakhstan's bid to become a member of the ASEAN Regional Forum on security. |
| Kuwait | January 17, 1979 | Main article: Kuwait–Philippines relations |
| Laos | January 14, 1955 | Main article: Laos–Philippines relations |
| Malaysia | 1959 | Main article: Malaysia–Philippines relations |
| Mongolia | October 11, 1973 | Main article: Mongolia–Philippines relations |
| Myanmar | September 29, 1956 | Main article: Myanmar–Philippines relations |
| Nepal | February 12, 1960 | The Philippines and Nepal established diplomatic relations on February 12, 1960. Both countries are members of the Non-Aligned Movement. There are about 300 Filipinos living in Nepal, mainly missionaries, professionals, skilled workers, volunteers, or spouses of Nepalese or other nationals as of March 2011. Approximately 500 Nepalese students are studying in the Philippines for their higher-level education. |
| North Korea | July 12, 2000 | Main article: North Korea–Philippines relations |
| Oman | October 6, 1980 | Main article: Oman–Philippines relations |
| Pakistan | September 8, 1949 | Main article: Pakistan–Philippines relations |
| Palestine | 1989 | Main article: Palestine–Philippines relations The Philippines was among the 138 countries that voted in favor of the United Nations resolution recognizing Palestine as a non-member state. |
| Qatar | April 12, 1975 | Main article: Philippines–Qatar relations |
| Saudi Arabia | September 24, 1969 | Main article: Philippines–Saudi Arabia relations |
| Singapore | May 16, 1969 | Main article: Philippines–Singapore relations |
| South Korea | March 3, 1949 | Main article: Philippines–South Korea relations The Philippines was the fifth state to recognize the Republic of Korea and the first ASEAN country to establish relations with South Korea. |
| Sri Lanka | January 10, 1961 | Main article: Philippines–Sri Lanka relations |
| Syria | September 4, 1946 | The Republic of the Philippines formally established diplomatic relations with the Syrian Arab Republic on September 4, 1946. The Philippines has an embassy in Damascus. Syria has an consulate in Manila. |
| Taiwan | N/A (Formal relations rescinded in 1975) | Main article: Philippines–Taiwan relations The Philippines recognizes the One-China policy but has informal relations with the Republic of China (ROC, also known as Taiwan) through the Manila Economic and Cultural Office in Taipei and the Taipei Economic and Cultural Office in Manila. |
| Tajikistan | March 25, 1992 | |
| Thailand | June 14, 1949 | Main article: Philippines–Thailand relations |
| Timor-Leste | May 20, 2002 | Main article: Philippines–Timor-Leste relations |
| Turkey | June 13, 1949 | See Philippines–Turkey relations: Philippines has an embassy in Ankara.; Turkey has an embassy in Manila.; Trade volume between the two countries was US$219.7 million in 2015 (Filipino exports/imports: 115.7/104 million USD).; 2,200 Philippine nationals are residing in Turkey.; There are direct flights from Istanbul to Manila since March 2015. |
| United Arab Emirates | June 17, 1980 | Main article: Philippines–United Arab Emirates relations |
| Uzbekistan | April 13, 1992 | The first round of political consultations between the Philippines and Uzbekistan was held in Tashkent on March 3, 2011. Uzbekistan expressed its support for the Philippines' bid to gain observer status in the OIC and its hopes for the resolution of the Muslim insurgency mainly affecting the southern part of the Philippines. The Philippines highlighted untapped potential, despite remote geographical position, for developing trade and economic cooperation, especially between Filipino and Uzbek financial institutions. |
| Vietnam | July 12, 1976 | Main article: Philippines–Vietnam relations |
| Yemen | May 4, 1977 | In 2011, there were about 1,600 Filipinos working in Yemen with about a thousand in the capital of Sanaa. The majority worked in the health and petroleum industries. Yemen supports the Philippines' bid for observer status in the Organisation of Islamic Cooperation and a peaceful resolution to the Islamic insurgency in the Philippines. |

=== Africa ===
| Country | Formal relations began | Notes |
|---|---|---|
| Egypt | January 18, 1955 | Main article: Egypt–Philippines relations |
| Equatorial Guinea | 1968 | Equatorial Guinea supported the Philippines's bid for a non-permanent seat in the United Nations Security Council. Both the Philippines and Equatorial Guinea were former Spanish colonies. There are about 4,000 Filipino workers in Equatorial Guinea. There has been cordial ties especially in the fields of trade and investments, agriculture, education, cultural and technical cooperation. The Philippines is interested in partnering with Equatorial Guinean entities to conduct oil exploration and the possibility of importing oil from Equatorial Guinea. The Philippines is also interested in developing infrastructure for seaports to improve cargo handling and delivery. He likewise expressed Philippine interest in developing facilities for seaports to improve cargo handling and delivery. |
| Ethiopia | 2013 | The Philippines and Ethiopia signed their first air agreement in 2014. |
| Ghana | March 5, 1957 | The Republic of Ghana has opened its consulate in the Philippines to extend and render assistance to Ghanaians and help maintain relations between the two countries. |
| Gambia | June 26, 1996 | Main article: The Gambia–Philippines relations |
| Ivory Coast | March 21, 1995 | There were some 100 Filipinos in Côte d'Ivoire, mostly professional and skilled workers and some permanent residents, and the Philippine government had repatriated 10 Filipinos after tensions in the country started following the second round of the 2010 presidential elections. |
| Kenya | May 20, 1975 | Kenya–Philippines relations Kenya is represented to the Philippines from its embassy in Jakarta, Indonesia. On the other hand, the Philippines maintains an embassy in Nairobi. |
| Libya | November 17, 1976 | Main article: Libya–Philippines relations |
| Morocco | December 27, 1975 | Main article: Morocco–Philippines relations |
| Mozambique | March 27, 1997 | |
| Nigeria | 1962 | Main article: Nigeria–Philippines relations |
| Sierra Leone | 1991 | Sierra Leone and the Philippines have pledged to strengthen bilateral relations to the mutual benefit of both countries. The two countries vow to work further to expand their relations in the socio-economic, political and cultural fields. |
| South Africa | November 1, 1993 | Main article: Philippines–South Africa relations |
| South Sudan | March 13, 2013 | Main article: Philippines–South Sudan relations The Philippines officially recognized South Sudan as a sovereign and independent state soon after South Sudan declared its independence on July 9, 2011. |

=== Americas ===
| Country | Formal relations began | Notes |
|---|---|---|
| Argentina | 1948 | Main article: Argentina–Philippines relations |
| Bolivia | January 6, 1970 | Bolivia and Philippines were both Spanish colonies, diplomatic relations between the two countries began in 1970. The Philippine Embassy in Buenos Aires exercised jurisdiction over Bolivia. Furthermore, the Embassy of Bolivia in Tokyo has jurisdiction over the Philippines, while the Philippine Embassy in Santiago, Chile, has jurisdiction over Bolivia. It also has two honorary consulates in Bolivia in the cities of La Paz and Santa Cruz de la Sierra. There are about 15 Filipinos in Bolivia most of them are religious missionaries and others are married with Bolivians. |
| Brazil | July 4, 1946 | Main article: Brazil–Philippines relations |
| Barbados | June 22, 2009 | Barbados established formal relations with the Philippines with the signing of a Joint Communique on the Establishment of Diplomatic Relations in New York on June 22, 2009. The establishment of relations was proposed by Barbados the year before through the Philippines' embassy in Caracas in Venezuela. With the closure of the Philippine Embassy in Caracas in 2012, jurisdiction was transferred to the Philippine Embassy in Washington, D.C. |
| Belize | 4 May 2000 | Both countries established diplomatic relations on May 4, 2000. |
| Canada | 1949 | Main article: Canada–Philippines relations |
| Chile | 1947 | Main article: Chile–Philippines relations |
| Colombia | July 5, 1946 | Colombia-Philippines relations remain strong, Colombians were among the Latin Americans who supported the revolt of Andres Novales, Emperor of the Philippines, against Spain. The first Miss International, Stella Marquez of Colombia, also married Jorge Araneta a Filipino of partial Mexican descent. |
| Cuba | September 3, 1952 | Main article: Cuba–Philippines relations |
| Mexico | April 14, 1953 | Main article: Mexico–Philippines relations |
| Peru | November 30, 1974 | Main article: Peru-Philippines relations |
| United States | July 4, 1946 | Main article: Philippines–United States relations |
| Venezuela | August 27, 1968 | Main article: Philippines–Venezuela relations |

=== Europe ===
| Country | Formal relations began | Notes |
|---|---|---|
| Armenia | May 20, 1992 | Main article: Armenia–Philippines relations: The Philippines and Armenia established bilateral relations in 1992.; Foreign Minister Eduard Nalbandyan visited the Philippines in 2012, the highest government official of Armenia to ever visit the Philippines.; Armenia has an ambassador resident in Hanoi.; The Philippines has an ambassador resident in Moscow. |
| Austria | October 17, 1946 | Main article: Austria–Philippines relations |
| Belgium | July 4, 1946 | Main article: Belgium–Philippines relations |
| Croatia | February 25, 1993 | Main article: Croatia–Philippines relations |
| Czech Republic | 1973 | Main article: Czech Republic–Philippines relations |
| Denmark | September 28, 1946 | Main article: Denmark–Philippines relations |
| France | June 26, 1947 | Main article: France–Philippines relations |
| Germany | April 25, 1955 | Main article: Germany–Philippines relations |
| Georgia | September 21, 1992 | |
| Greece | 1947 | Main article: Greece–Philippines relations |
| Holy See | April 9, 1951 | Main article: Holy See–Philippines relations |
| Hungary | 1976 | |
| Iceland | February 24, 1999 | Main article: Iceland–Philippines relations |
| Ireland | 1984 | Main article: Ireland–Philippines relations |
| Italy | July 9, 1947 | Main article: Italy–Philippines relations |
| Netherlands | May 17, 1951 | Main article: Netherlands–Philippines relations |
| North Macedonia | September 24, 2021 | On September 24, 2021, Foreign Secretary Teodoro Locsin Jr. signed a joint communique with Macedonian foreign minister Bujar Osmani to establish diplomatic relations between the two countries. |
| Norway | March 2, 1948 | Main article: Norway–Philippines relations |
| Poland | September 22, 1973 | Main article: Philippines–Poland relations |
| Romania | April 12, 1975 | Main article: Philippines–Romania relations |
| Russia | June 2, 1976 | Main article: Philippines–Russia relations |
| Serbia | February 28, 1972 | Both countries have established diplomatic relations in 1972.; A number of bilateral agreements in various fields have been concluded and are in force between both countries. |
| Spain | September 27, 1947 | Main article: Philippines–Spain relations |
| Sweden | 1947 | Main article: Philippines–Sweden relations Diplomatic relations between the Philippines and Sweden were established in 1947, and have steadily intensified during the years. Sweden has long been a development partner of the Philippines. Sweden's cooperation with the Philippines focuses on issues concerning the environment, human rights, good governance, training, and assistance to non-government organizations (NGOs). |
| Switzerland | August 30, 1956 | Main article: Philippines–Switzerland relations |
| Turkey | June 13, 1949 | Main article: Philippines–Turkey relations |
| Ukraine | April 7, 1992 | Main article: Philippines–Ukraine relations |
| United Kingdom | July 4, 1946 | Main article: Philippines–United Kingdom relations The Philippines established diplomatic relations with the United Kingdom on 4 July 1946.: The Philippines maintains an embassy in London.; The United Kingdom is accredited to the Philippines through its embassy in Manila.; Both countries share common membership of the World Trade Organization. Bilaterally the two countries have an Investment Agreement. |

=== Oceania ===
| Country | Formal relations began | Notes |
|---|---|---|
| Australia | May 22, 1946 | Main article: Australia–Philippines relations |
| Nauru | February 19, 1968 | Main article: Nauru–Philippines relations |
| New Zealand | July 6, 1966 | Main article: New Zealand–Philippines relations |
| Palau | July 15, 1997 | Main article: Palau–Philippines relations |
| Papua New Guinea | September 16, 1975 | Main article: Papua New Guinea–Philippines relations |

== Relations with former states ==
| Country | Formal Relations Began | Notes |
|---|---|---|
| South Vietnam | | Main article: Philippines–South Vietnam relations The Philippines recognized South Vietnam in July 1955. The Philippines sent troops to aid them in the Vietnam War. The Philippine embassy in Saigon ceased operations on April 29, 1975 |
| South Yemen | October 21, 1977 | |
| Yugoslavia | March 1, 1972 | |
| Soviet Union | | Main article: Philippines–Soviet Union relations |

== Multilateral relations ==
| Organizations | Formal Relations Began | Notes |
|---|---|---|
| Association of Southeast Asian Nations | | The Association of Southeast Asian Nations (ASEAN) was established on August 8, 1967, in Bangkok, with the signing of the Bangkok Declaration together with Indonesia, Malaysia, Singapore and Thailand. The Philippines was one of the Founding nations. |
| European Union | 2013 | Main article: Philippines–European Union relations The European Union and the Philippines shares diplomatic, economic, cultural and political relations. The European Union has provided €3 million to the Philippines to fight poverty and €6 million for counter-terrorism against terrorist groups in the Southern Philippines. The European Union is also the third largest trading partner of the Philippines. There are at least 31,961 Europeans (not including Spaniards) living in the Philippines. |
| United Nations | October 24, 1945 | Main article: Philippines and the United Nations When the Philippines joined signing the United Nations Charter in San Francisco, United States. This partnership has progressed since then into a number of development initiatives, activities and programs. Technical, financial and other forms of assistance to the Philippines began in the late 1940, as the country recovered from the ravages of World War II. The partnership between the United Nations and the Philippines began in 1945. |

== See also ==
- Territories claimed by the Philippines
- List of diplomatic missions in the Philippines
- List of diplomatic missions of the Philippines
- List of diplomatic visits to the Philippines
- List of ambassadors to the Philippines
