= Italy–Philippines relations =

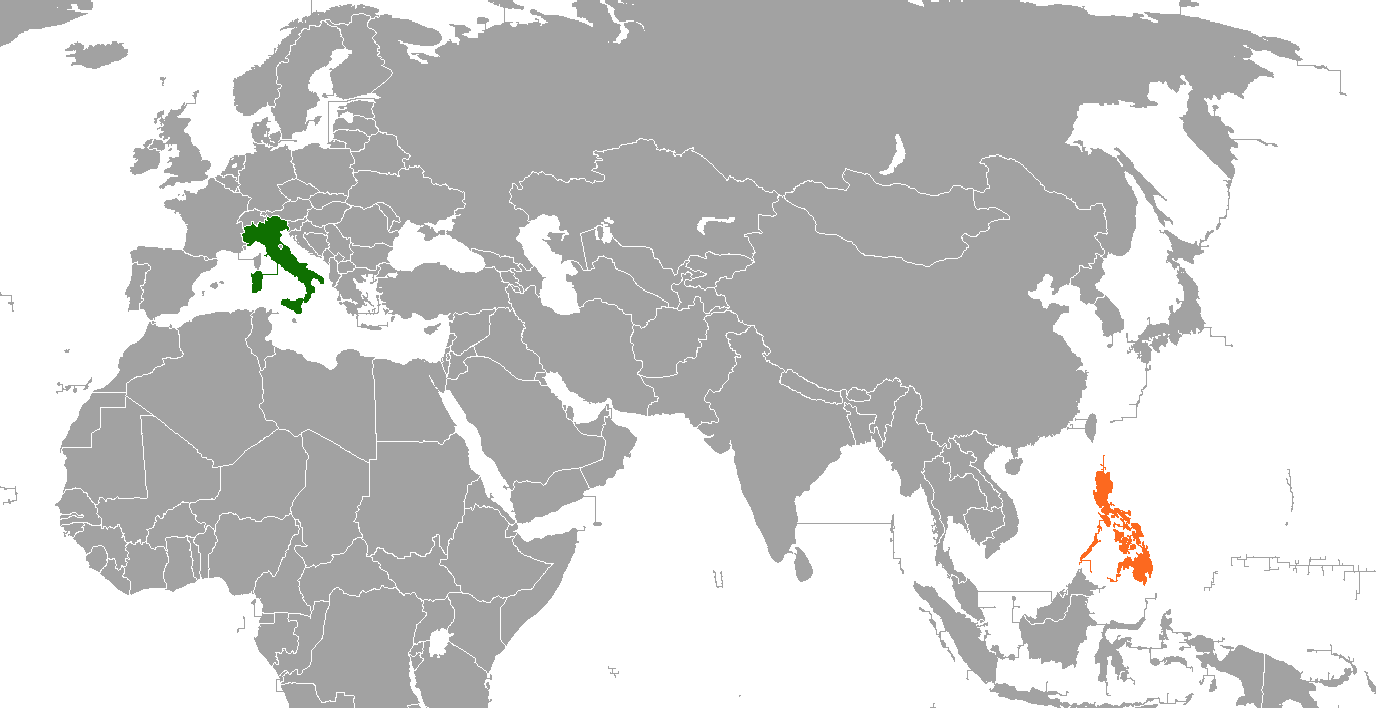

- Italy: Philippines

Italy–Philippines relations are the interstate and bilateral relations between Italy and the Philippines. The bilateral relations between Italy and the Philippines was established on 9 July 1947.

== History ==
Italians have been in the Philippines even before the formation of the modern country. In the 1300s, the Italian Franciscan Friar Odoric of Pordenone was said to have visited the then Kingdom of Caboloan (Pangasinan or Feng-chia-hsi-lan "馮嘉施蘭" in Chinese). The Italian chronicler Antonio Pigafetta visited the Philippines during the Magellan Expedition. Likewise when Spain had territory in Italy. Italians from Spanish-ruled-Italy: Sicily, Naples, and Milan; immigrated to the Philippines during the Spanish colonial era. The architectural styles of Sicilian Baroque and Philippine Earthquake Baroque influenced each other considerably. The Spanish governor of Panama, who once received Italians (Genoese) from Genoa, Don Sebastian Hurtado de Corcuera, sailed west from the Americas and used Peruvians, and Genoese from Panama Viejo in his conquest of Muslim areas of the Philippines which he subjugated to the Christian Presidio of Zamboanga. Zamboanga's Chavacano Creole language has Italian vocabulary and cognates. During the establishment of the First Philippine Republic, Italians joined the Philippine revolutionary army, one such Italian was Captain Camillo Ricchairdi, who worked under President Emilio Aguinaldo. Later on, the People Power Revolution in 1986 marked the beginning of expansion of bilateral relations between the two countries. Italy was the first country to recognize the Presidency of Corazon Aquino in the Philippines. Italy and the Philippines have signed several agreements, including in scientific and technical cooperation, air services, taxation, investments, development cooperation, culture, social security, small and medium enterprises, transportation and communications, and defense. The Philippines has welcomed a huge Italian business mission. The Confederation of Italian Industries, Italy's biggest association of manufacturing and services companies. The delegation also had parallel sectoral programs on trading, infrastructure and energy. Business-to-business meetings were also arranged between Italian and Philippine companies. In December 2015, a bilateral air transport agreement was signed between the two countries during the visit of Philippine President Benigno Aquino III to Rome to allow for the expansion of trade and tourism ties.

== Filipinos in Italy ==
Filipinos form the fourth-largest migrant community in Italy, after the Romanian, Albanian, and North African communities. Italy is also the joint largest European migration destination for Filipinos. The Italian capital Rome is home to the largest Filipino community. Roughly 108,000 Filipinos reside in Italy legally as temporary workers or permanent residents, and estimates on the number of illegal Filipinos vary widely from 20,000 to 80,000. In 2008, ISTAT (Istituto Nazionale di Statistica), Italy's statistics office, reported that there were 113,686 documented Filipinos living in Italy whereas the number had been 105,675 in 2007. 63% of Filipino Italians are women and they mostly work as domestic assistants. The Filipino Department of Labor and Employment (DOLE) says that Italy allows 5000 non-seasonal/regular workers, up from 3000 in 2007. The DOLE said that the change was "a sign of appreciation of the good bilateral cooperation with the Philippines in migratory issues." There are approximately 60 Filipino organisations in Italy, most of which are church-based, although there are several cultural and civic groups as well. One of such groups is the Filipino Women's Council with the aim of educating Filipino women migrants about their rights and lobbying on their behalf. In 2007, Italy gave Filipinos with a Filipino driver's license a free Italian driver's license.

== Resident diplomatic missions ==
- Italy has an embassy in Manila.
- the Philippines has an embassy in Rome and a consulate-general in Milan.

== See also ==
- Foreign relations of Italy
- Foreign relations of the Philippines
- Embassy of the Philippines, Rome
