= Austria–Philippines relations =

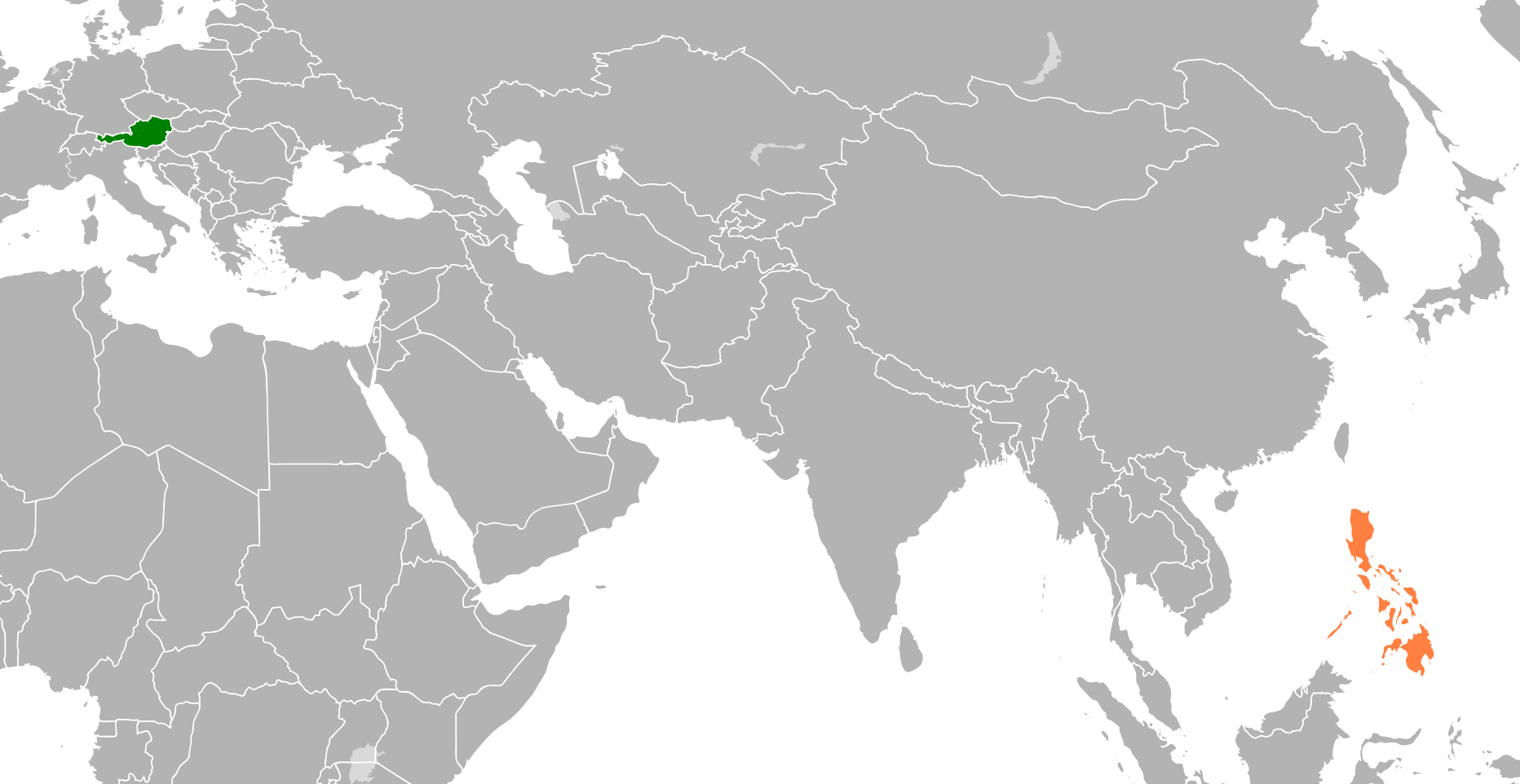

- Austria: Philippines

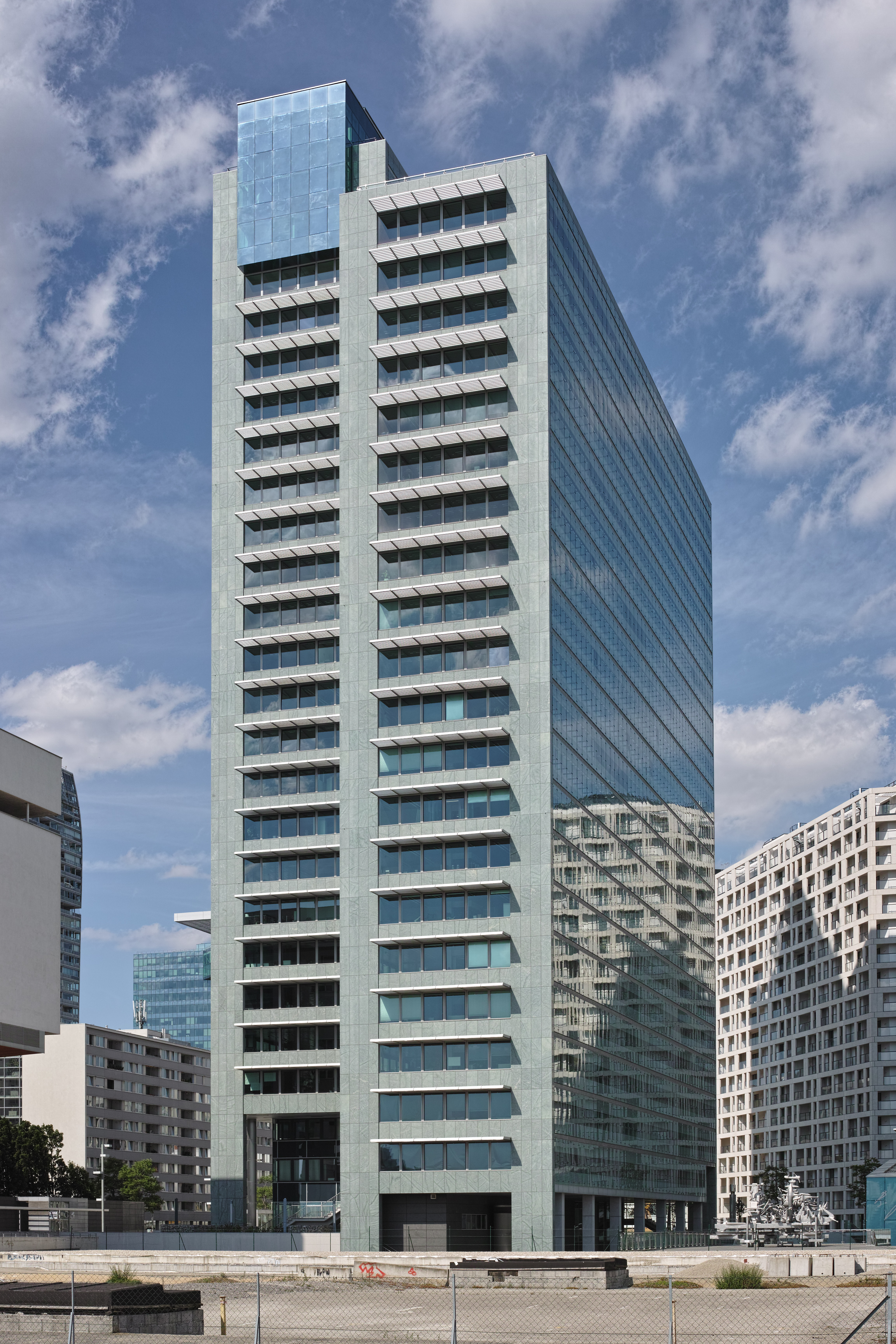
Embassy of the Philippines, Vienna

Bilateral relations exist between Austria and the Philippines. Austrian presence in the Philippines has been established as early as 1871, with the establishment of an Austro-Hungarian honorary consulate in Manila though relation tie originally trace back Habsburg Spain. The Philippine National Hero Jose Rizal had a deep friendship with the Austrian-Bohemian anthropologist Ferdinand Blumentritt.

Formal diplomatic relations between Austria and the Philippines was established on October 17, 1946. In 1973, the Philippines opened its resident embassy in Vienna. Prior to that, Philippine interests in Austria was represented under the Philippine Embassy in Bern, Switzerland.

Austria established its own embassy in Manila in 1982.

== Filipino diaspora ==
About 35,000 Filipinos reside in Austria as of 2014, with the majority working in the health and service industries. An estimated amount of 90 percent of the Filipinos in Austria are employed as nurses and midwives in hospital and homes of elderly people throughout Austria. Filipino nurses started to flock to Austria as early as on the 1970s.

== Literature ==
- Maria Zeneida Angara Collinson, et al.: Philippine-Austria Relations: 500 years. Embassy of the Republic of the Philippines in Austria, 2017. ISBN 978-3-200-05061-7

== Resident diplomatic missions ==
- Austria has an embassy in Manila.
- the Philippines has an embassy in Vienna.

== See also ==
- Foreign relations of Austria
- Foreign relations of the Philippines
- List of ambassadors of Austria to the Philippines
