= Philippines–Sweden relations =

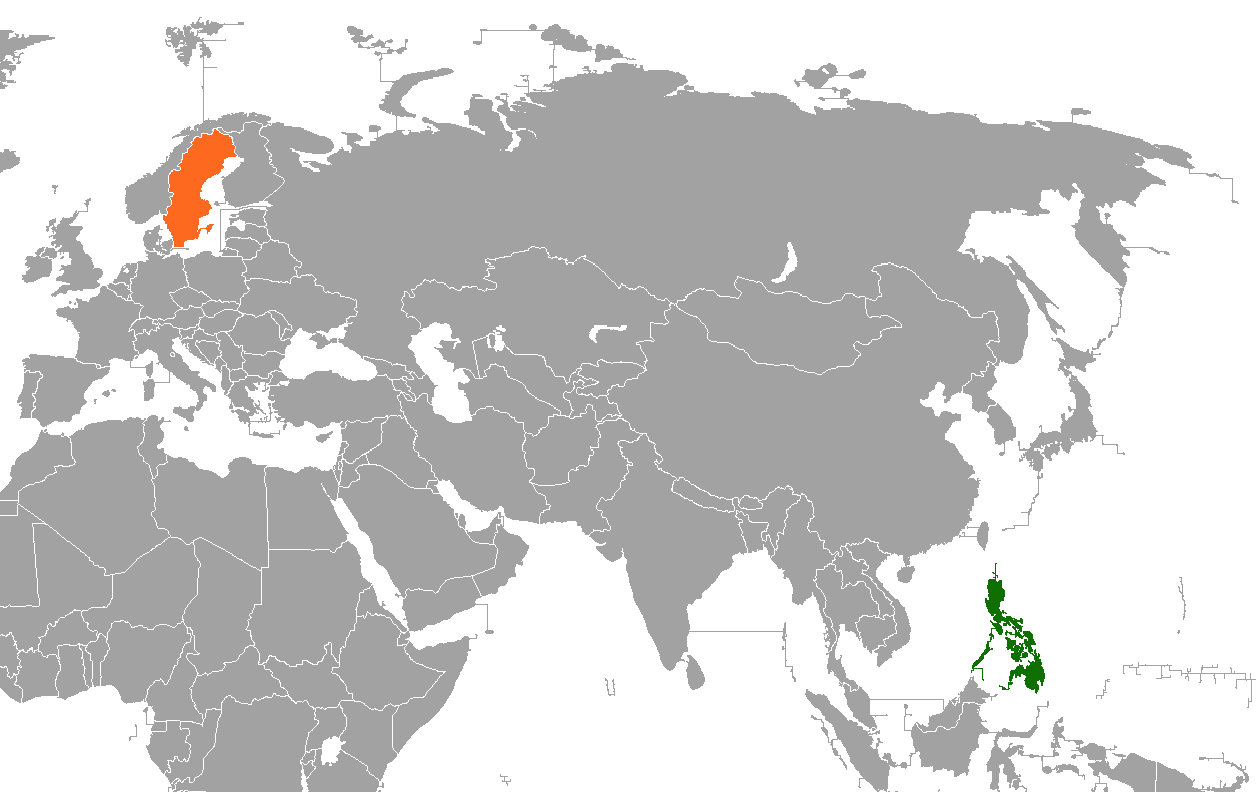

- Philippines: Sweden

Philippines–Sweden relations refers to the bilateral relations between the Philippines and Sweden.

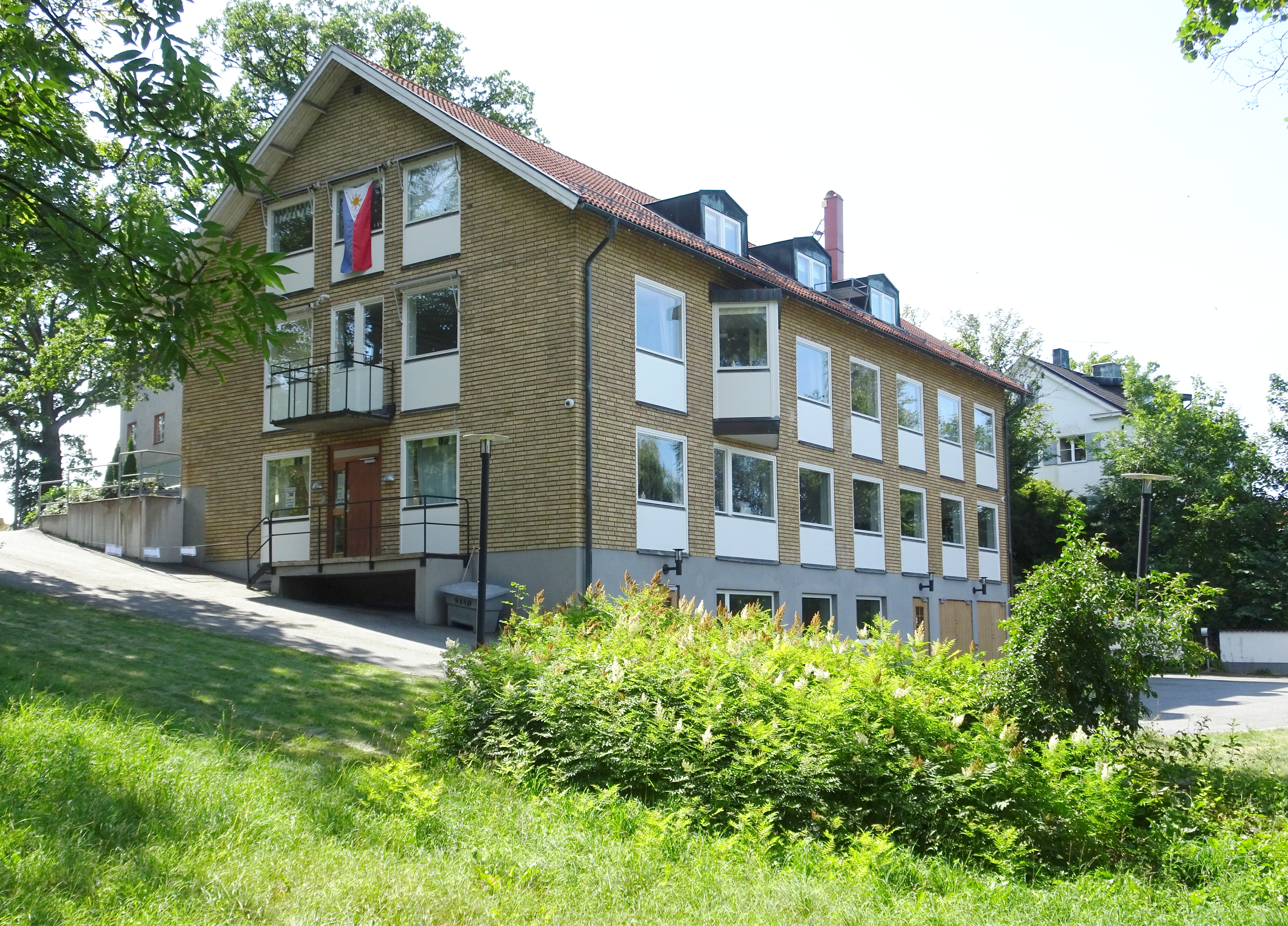
Embassy of the Philippines, Stockholm

== Diplomatic missions ==
Diplomatic relations between Sweden and the Philippines were established in 1947. Sweden and the Philippines are both represented by a resident embassy.

However, both embassies were closed for a certain period. Sweden closed its embassy in Manila in 2008, but it was reopened in 2016. The Philippines, on its part, closed its embassy in Stockholm in 2012 due to economic restraints, but reopened it in 2020. During this period, the Philippines was represented by a non-resident ambassador in Oslo, Norway.

The Philippines has an ambassador in Stockholm.

== Economic relations ==
In 2016, 70 delegates from 28 Swedish firms arrived in Manila to look for investments in the country. Among them were home appliance manufacturer Electrolux, Volvo, H&M and tobacco manufacturer Swedish Match. Sweden was ranked as the Philippines' 43rd largest trading partner, with the total amount of bilateral trade reaching more than US$143.40 million. In 2021, the Swedish multinational conglomerate IKEA opened its largest store in Manila.

== Agreements ==
In 2015, the two countries signed a social security agreement which coordinates the general Swedish and Philippine systems for old-age, survivors’ and disability pensions.

== Migration to Sweden ==
There are more than 13,000 Filipinos in Sweden most of them are overseas workers.

== Resident diplomatic missions ==
- the Philippines has an embassy in Stockholm.
- Sweden has an embassy in Manila.

== See also ==
- Foreign relations of the Philippines
- Foreign relations of Sweden
