= Belgium–Philippines relations =

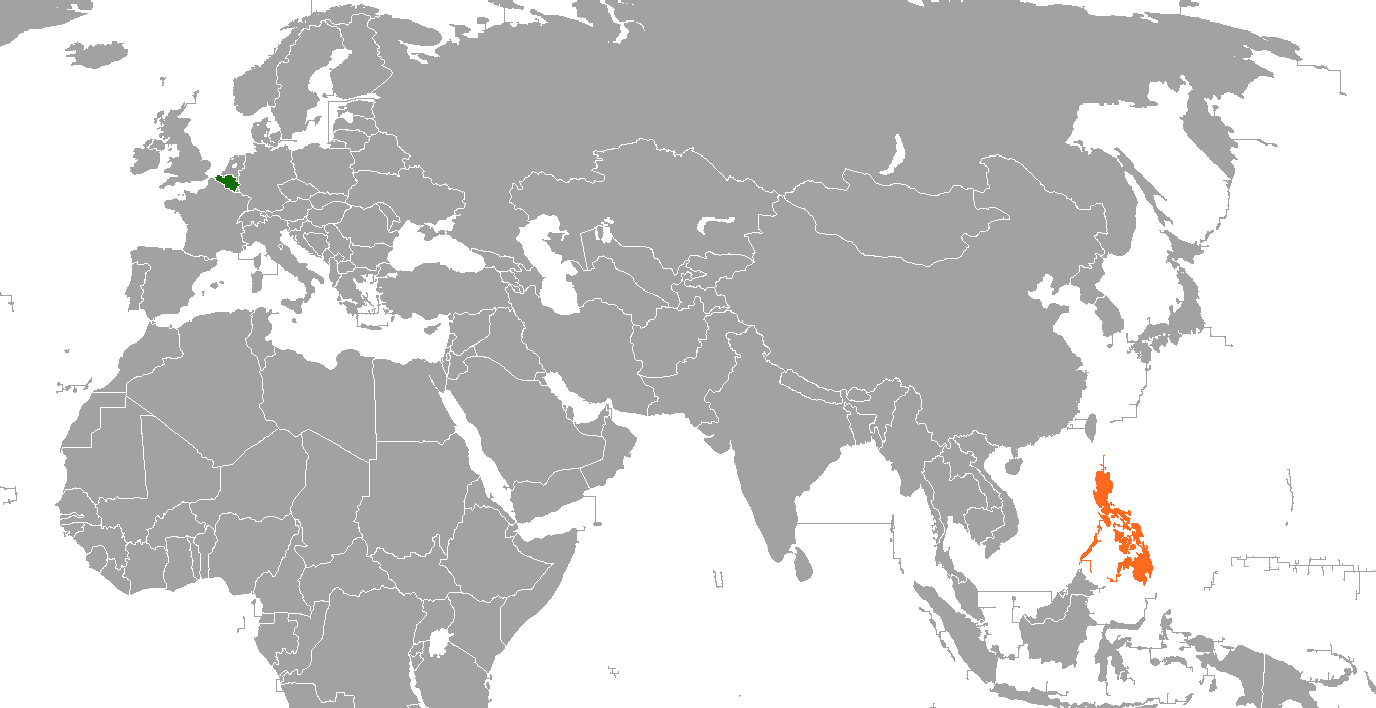

- Belgium: Philippines

Belgium–Philippines relations refers to the bilateral relations between Belgium and the Philippines. Belgium has an embassy in Manila and the Philippines has an embassy in Brussels.

== History ==
Connections between Belgium and the Philippines can be traced back in the Colonial era during the reign of Leopold II of Belgium. In 1875, Leopold proposed to purchase the Spanish colony of the Philippines, their sole colony in the Far East, but his offer was declined.

Formal diplomatic relations between Belgium and the Philippines was established on July 4, 1946.

== Economic relations ==
During a visit to the Philippines in September 1995, Belgian State Secretary Reginald Moreels decided to designate the Philippines as a "partner country" meaning that the country is prioritized as a recipient of Belgian development assistance. This designation remained until April 2000. Since 1995, Belgium has given the Philippines more than 45 million Euros worth of grants and loans as economic and social development aid to the country.

After 80 years of the diplomatic partnership between the two countries, the chairperson of the Mindanao Development Authority Leo Tereso Magno, met with the Belgian Ambassador Ladislava Yourdanova in a high level diplomatic and economic visit and discussed environment, logistics, maritime industries and regional development in Mindanao.

== Resident diplomatic missions ==
- Belgium has an embassy in Manila.
- the Philippines has an embassy in Brussels.

== See also ==
- Foreign relations of Belgium
- Foreign relations of the Philippines
- Filipinos in Belgium
