= Philippine Phosphate Fertilizer Corporation =

- Industry: Agriculture; Chemical
- Founded: June 6, 1980; 46 years ago
- Headquarters: Pacific Star Building, Makati, Philippines
- Area served: Southeast and South Asia, Taiwan, Zambia
- Key people: Salvador Zamora II (Chairman)
- Products: Phosphate fertilizer
- Owners: Salvador Zamora II's firm (70%); Nauru government (30%); (2015)

Philippine Phosphate Fertilizer Corporation (PhilPhos) is a fertilizer company based in Makati, Metro Manila which is partly owned by the government of Nauru.

Its headquarters is located at the Pacific Star Building which was also built by the Nauru government.

== History ==
=== Early years ===
PhilPhos was established on June 6, 1980 by the National Development Company, a corporate investment arm by the Philippine government. The following year the construction of the Philphos fertilizer plant in Leyte, which was contracted by four companies, began and was completed in 1984. The plant became operational in 1987.

=== Privatization of Philippine government shares ===
In 1995 the Philippine government decided to sell its stakes in the company with the Nauru government waiving its first refusal rights to buy 45 percent of the Philippine government's stakes and the remaining 5 percent to be sold to small private investors.

On November 29, 2000, the Philippine government's stake was sold to Delphi Holdings of Jose Alvarez for ₱3 billion payable within the next two years. Alvarez who is said to be bidding in behalf of majority owner, the Nauru government, became the firm's chairman. Delphi Holdings paid the remaining ₱1 billion to the government in late 2002.

The company was losing money incurring an average annual loss of ₱2 billion for a period of 18 years. However, on the second year since the Delphi acquisition, the firm registered a profit of ₱300 million. By 2003, Delphi Holdings bought an additional 10 percent stake of the PhilPhos from the Nauru government. Delphi's stake at PhilPhos was later sold out to the a firm by Salvador Zamora II.

=== Typhoon Haiyan (Yolanda) ===
In 2013, the firm's plant in Leyte suffered from Typhoon Haiyan (locally known as Typhoon Yolanda). PhilPhos filed the largest insurance claim in Southeast Asia from 23 different insurance companies amounting to ₱300 million

The losses of the company due to the typhoon caused the firm to be defaulted twice on interest and principal payments for its ₱3.9 billion debt. A consortium of four banks, Cocolife, China Bank, Standard Chartered, and Philippine Veterans Bank voted on pursuing a foreclosure on PhilPhos for its failure to meet its financial obligations though the move did not happen after Veterans Bank decided to lend ₱1 billion to the fertilizer company citing "national interest".

70 percent of PhilPhos' stakes is owned by Zamora's firm while the rest is owned by the Nauru government as of 2015. Though the insurance claim filed by PhilPhos following the onslaught of the typhoon has yet to be honored by 2016, the company brought in an Indian firm to fully restore its Leyte plant which has become partially operational.

== Imports and exports ==
PhilPhos imports all of the phosphate rocks it process. In 2005 the top countries PhilPhos sources its phosphate rocks from are China, Nauru, and Togo. As of 2015, the top phosphate rock source are Algeria, Egypt, Morocco, Jordan and Peru.

By 2013, 35 percent of Philphos' total production serves the Philippine market while the remaining 65 percent exported to foreign markets namely Vietnam, Thailand, Malaysia, Indonesia and Cambodia, India, Bangladesh, Pakistan, and Taiwan. In the same year, the firm exported to Zambia which was according to the company marks the first time a Filipino fertilizer company exported to Africa.

== Electricity ==
The company also operates a 14.21 MW coal-fired thermal power plant within the Leyte Industrial Development Estate in Isabel, Leyte, where its fertilizer plant is located. The Energy Regulatory Commission awarded the firm a Certificate of Compliance in regards to its operation of the power plant.
