= Croatia–Philippines relations =

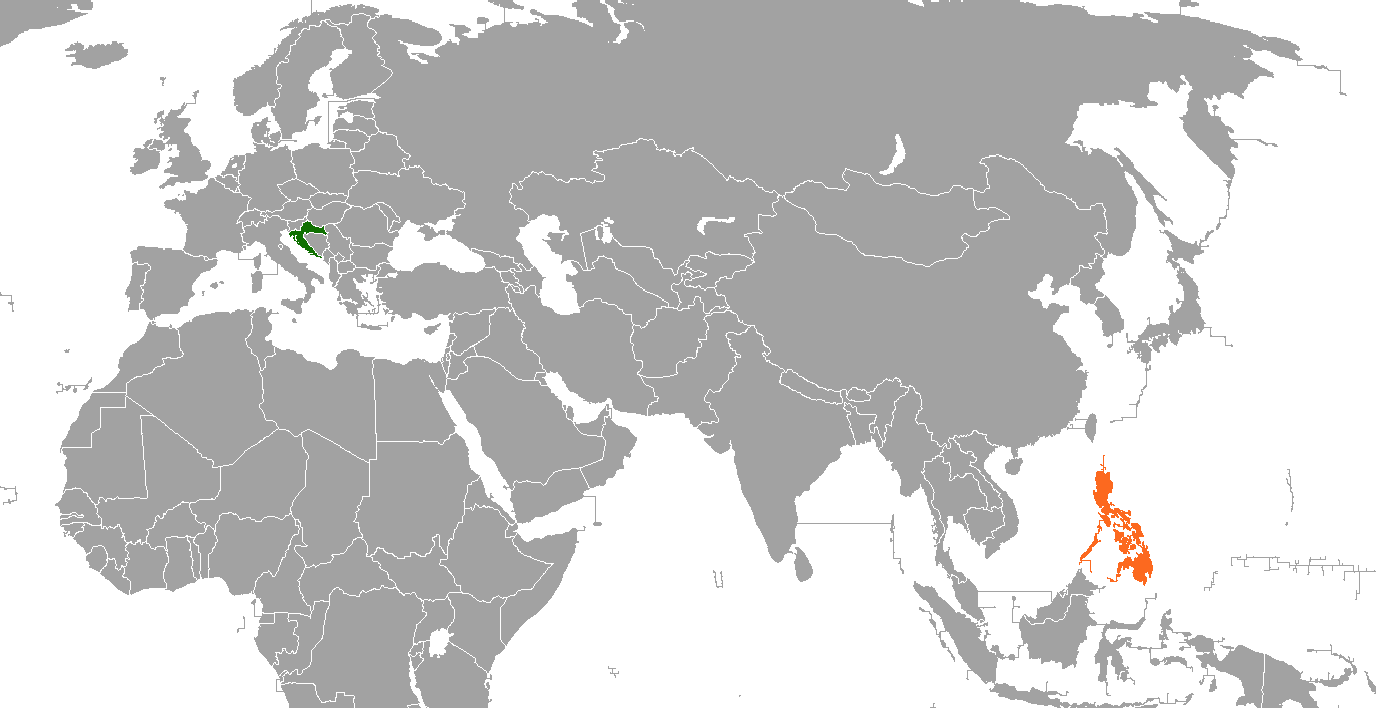

- Croatia: Philippines

Diplomatic relations were established between Croatia and the Philippines on February 25, 1993, soon after the Philippines recognized Croatia as an independent nation in 1992. The two countries have links between their shipping industries, including port management, and seafarers. Croatia has a non resident ambassador in Jakarta. The Philippines has a non resident ambassador in Vienna.

== Agreements ==
In 1993, the governments signed an agreement abolishing the requirement for a visa for holders of diplomatic and official passports.

In 1995, the governments reached an agreement on scientific and technological cooperation.

In 2009, the governments signed an agreement on cultural cooperation.

In 2009, the Croatian Ministry of Sports and the Philippine Board of Sports signed a memorandum on cooperation in the field of sports.

In 2019, a memorandum of understanding was signed regarding defence cooperation.

In 2025, Philippines' Department of Migrant Workers (DMW) signed an MoU with the Croatian government that would open work opportunities for the Filipino workers in the hospitality sector.

== Representation ==
Neither country has a diplomatic mission in each other's territories. The Philippine Embassy in Vienna, Austria, is accredited to Croatia. On the other hand, the Croatian ambassador accredited to the Philippines is based in the embassy in Indonesia.

== Meetings ==
In 2012, Croatia and the Philippines conducted their second political consultation in Manila. This was conducted at the sub-ministerial level according to a protocol signed in 2005. The meeting identified shipbuilding as a potential area of cooperation.

In 2018, Croatia and the Philippines held their third political consultation meeting in New York, marking their 25th anniversary of diplomatic relations. Both sides renewed their commitment to bilateral ties in the meeting.

== Trade and investment ==
As of June 2012 trade between the two countries was valued at $4 million per annum. In 2012, the Philippines were investigating Croatia as a destination for fruit exports.

Since 2011, International Container Terminal Services Inc., a Philippine port operation company, has operated Brajdica Container Terminal, the shipping container terminal at the Port of Rijeka, Croatia's largest port, and owned a majority stake in Adriatic Gate Container Terminal, a Croatian port operation company. The Philippine ambassador Lourdes Yparraguirre was present at the signing, and hailed the deal as "a major boost to enhancing bilateral relations between the vibrant economies".

From May 2025 to April 2026 the Philippines imports from Croatia totaled 3.41 million USD.

== UN-related contacts ==
In 2018, the third sub-ministerial meeting was held at the Croatian Mission to the United Nations, on the sidelines of the 73rd United Nations General Assembly. A joint issue of commemorative stamps was released by both countries to commemorate the 25 year bilateral relationship.

In 2019, the Philippines suspended any loan or grant negotiation or signing with Croatia and 17 other countries in response to their vote in support of a United Nations Human Rights Council resolution to investigate extrajudicial killings during the Philippine drug war.

== Military ==
In 2012, the Defence ministers of the two countries met during an official Croatian delegation visit to the Philippines and discussed potential cooperation on military technology, shipbuilding, and between their respective navies, particularly in combating piracy. In 2019, Filipino defense secretary Delfin Lorenzana and Croatian deputy PM and minister of defense Damir Krstičević met in Split in Croatia and signed a memorandum of understanding for defense cooperation. Cooperation was to happen in the fields of defense and security policy, military education, training and capacity building, military equipment, logistics and maintenance, defense industry, and technology. During the 2012 meeting, Croatia offered to build ships for the Philippine Coast Guard and overhaul existing ships, as well as pistols and assault rifles manufactured to NATO standards.

== Resident diplomatic missions ==
- Croatia is accredited to the Philippines from its embassy in Jakarta, Indonesia.
- The Philippines is accredited to Croatia from its embassy in Vienna, Austria.

== See also ==
- Foreign relations of Croatia
- Foreign relations of the Philippines
