= Yuliia Fediv =

Ukrainian cultural manager and diplomat (born 1986)

Her Excellency Yuliia Fediv
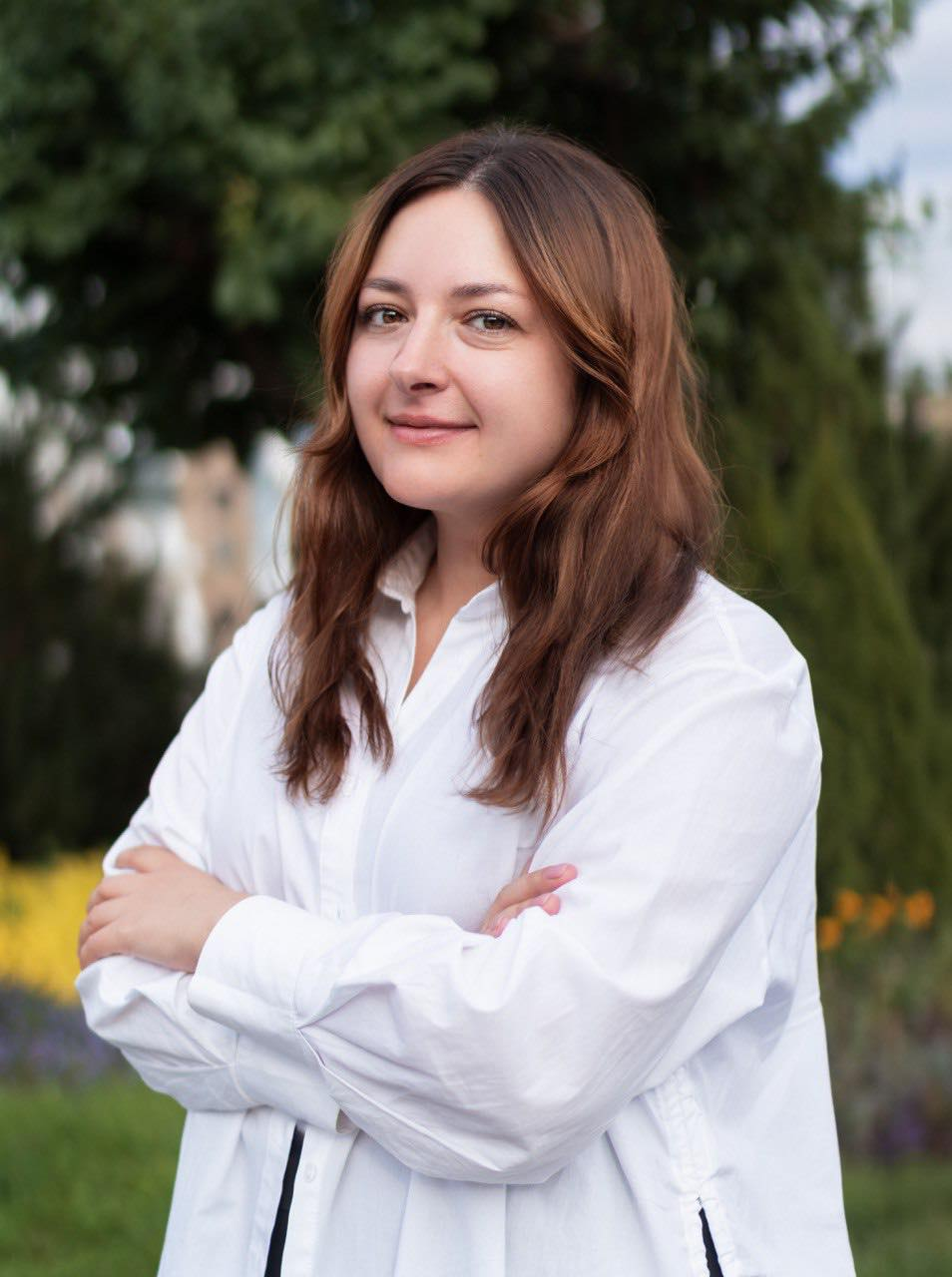
- Fediv in 2024

Ambassador of Ukraine to the Philippines
- Incumbent
- Assumed office 25 March 2025
- President: Volodymyr Zelenskyy

Personal details
- Born: Yuliia Oleksandrivna Fediv; 20 December 1986 (age 39) Chernivtsi, Ukrainian SSR, Soviet Union
- Education: Chernivtsi University; National Academy of Management (LLM); University of Bremen
- Occupation: Civil servant; diplomat
- Awards: Women in Arts Award

Yuliia Oleksandrivna Fediv (Ukrainian: Юлія Олександрівна Федів; born 20 December 1986) is a Ukrainian civil servant, cultural manager and diplomat who is currently serving as the Ukrainian ambassador to the Philippines since March 2025. She was the first executive director of the Ukrainian Cultural Foundation (UCF) from 2018 to 2021 and has held leadership roles in organisations such as Hromadske and the Ukrainian Institute. Fediv also served as the national coordinator for culture at the UNESCO Office in Ukraine in 2023 and headed Ukraine's National Bureau for the EU's Creative Europe programme from 2017 to 2021.

== Early life and education ==
Yuliia Oleksandrivna Fediv was born on 20 December 1986 in the city of Chernivtsi. Her father is a professor, a doctor of medical sciences, and the dean of a department at the Bukovinian State Medical University. She attended a German-speaking gymnasium and, in the ninth grade, travelled to Germany through a partnership programme, where she was introduced to aspects of the local culture. This experience inspired her decision to study international relations, as she realised the profound influence of culture on diplomatic ties.

Fediv pursued higher education at Yuriy Fedkovych Chernivtsi National University, specialising in international relations, and simultaneously studied business law at the National Academy of Management in 2004. She continued her academic journey at the University of Bremen, graduating in 2009 with a degree in international and European law. Further enhancing her international experience, Fediv completed a three-month internship at the United Nations in Bonn in 2010, followed by a six-month placement at the Bundestag in Berlin in 2011.

== Career ==
Fediv began her public career in 2011, working as a project manager for children's rights protection at the German-Polish-Ukrainian Society in Kyiv, Ukraine. In 2015, she expanded her role by coordinating journalistic projects for prominent German media outlets, including the n-ost news agency and Deutsche Welle. That same year, she participated in a five-day "Youth Worker" training programme in Kyiv and completed advanced executive training in Berlin. Alongside her work in information policy, Fediv also made significant contributions to the theatre sector, coordinating a project for the European Theatre Convention in Berlin. During this time, she managed initiatives across the theatre, social, and media sectors, and fostered collaboration between the German and Ukrainian communities.

From 2016 to 2017, Fediv managed projects for the German Agency for Technical Assistance to Ukraine (GIZ). In 2016, she also took on the role of regional coordinator for the "Partnership with the Cities of Ukraine" initiative and became the head of the National Office for the EU's Creative Europe programme in Ukraine. In her role with Creative Europe, which provided grants to media and cultural professionals, Fediv played a key role in securing up to €200,000 in funding for each of four international collaboration initiatives, with only five such initiatives in existence by 2017. On 7 February 2018, Fediv was appointed as the first executive director of the Ukrainian Cultural Foundation (UCF), with the Ministry of Culture, Youth and Sports finalising a three-year contract with her the following day.

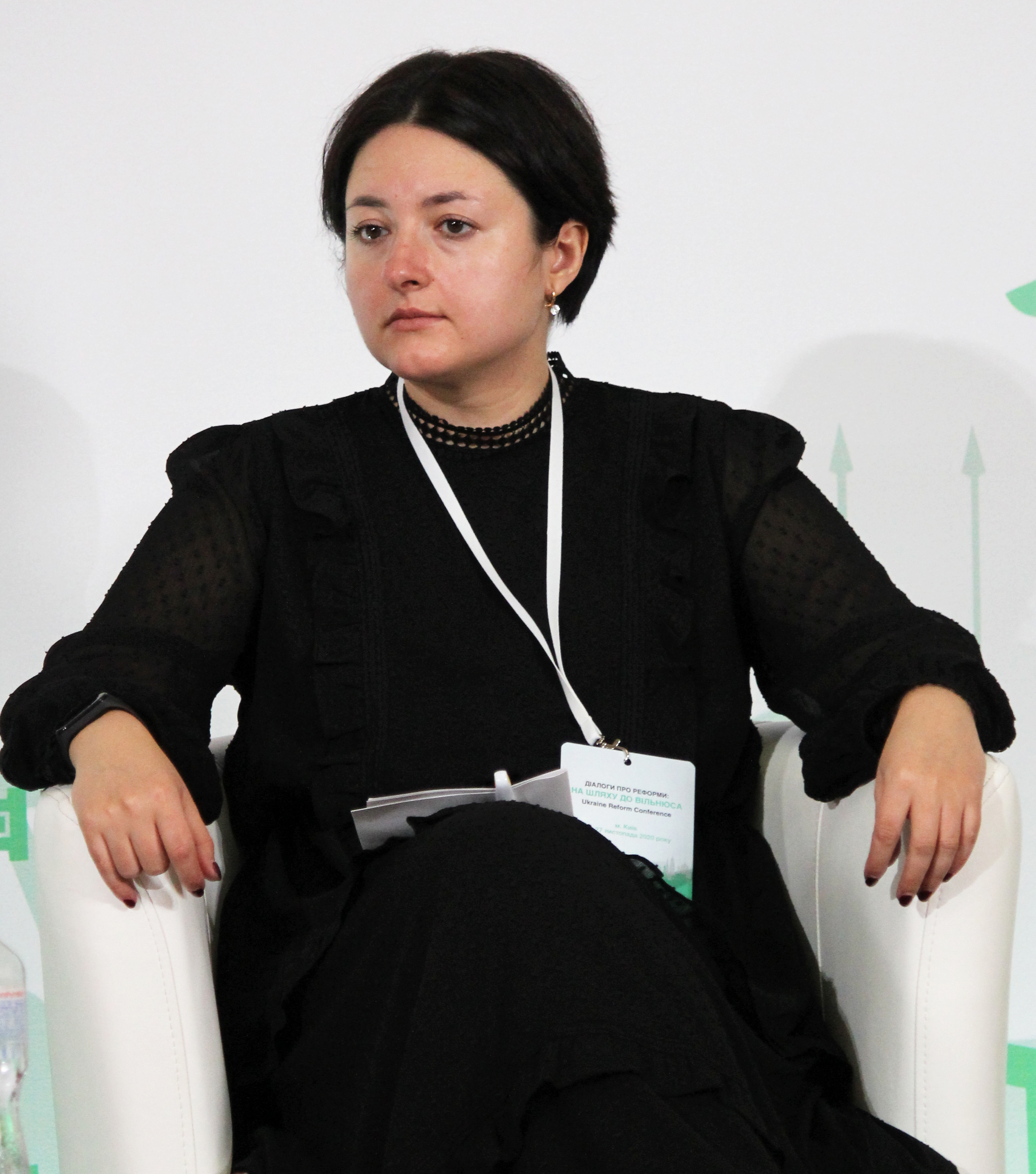
Fediv in 2020

After completing her three-year term, she initially submitted her candidacy for re-election but withdrew it on 23 March 2021 due to a scandal involving allegations from the Union of the Concert Industry of Ukraine (SKIU) over grant distribution procedures. In July 2021, she was appointed as the director of Hromadske, chosen from among 90 candidates. During her tenure, she aimed to develop a strategic plan for the organisation's growth and ensure sustainable funding. However, she resigned in the summer of 2022 after less than a year, following significant layoffs. Fediv then pursued an internship in the United States as part of the 2022–2023 Hubert H. Humphrey Fellowship Programme. In September 2021, she announced that criminal charges had been brought against her.

In September 2023, government sources mentioned Fediv as a potential candidate for the position of Ukraine's Minister of Culture and Information Policy (MCIP), amid broader discussions about changes in the Shmyhal Government by the office of the President of Ukraine. According to Suspilne's sources, Prime Minister Denys Shmyhal had already begun drafting a proposal for parliament after Fediv expressed her approval of the idea, although she refrained from making an official statement. This came after the resignation of Oleksandr Tkachenko on 20 July. Fediv agreed to take on the role of MCIP, acknowledging the challenges ahead, including a reduced budget for culture, the ongoing effects of the invasion, and unresolved issues left by her predecessors. In 2023, she joined Suspilne, and by April 2024, she became a member of its board.

Ambassador Fediv with the President of the Philippines on 25 March 2025

On 21 December 2024, President Volodymyr Zelenskyy appointed Fediv as Ambassador Extraordinary and Plenipotentiary of Ukraine to the Philippines. Following this, on 15 January 2025, the supervisory board of Suspilne decided to terminate Fediv's powers as a board member responsible for socially influential content and special projects, with her official departure set for 9 March. Fediv presented her credentials as Ukraine's ambassador to President Bongbong Marcos during a ceremony at Malacañang Palace on 25 March 2025. During the ceremony, she pledged to promote initiatives aimed at fostering peace, prosperity, mutual respect, and strengthening bilateral relations.

== Controversies ==
=== Ukrainian Cultural Foundation ===
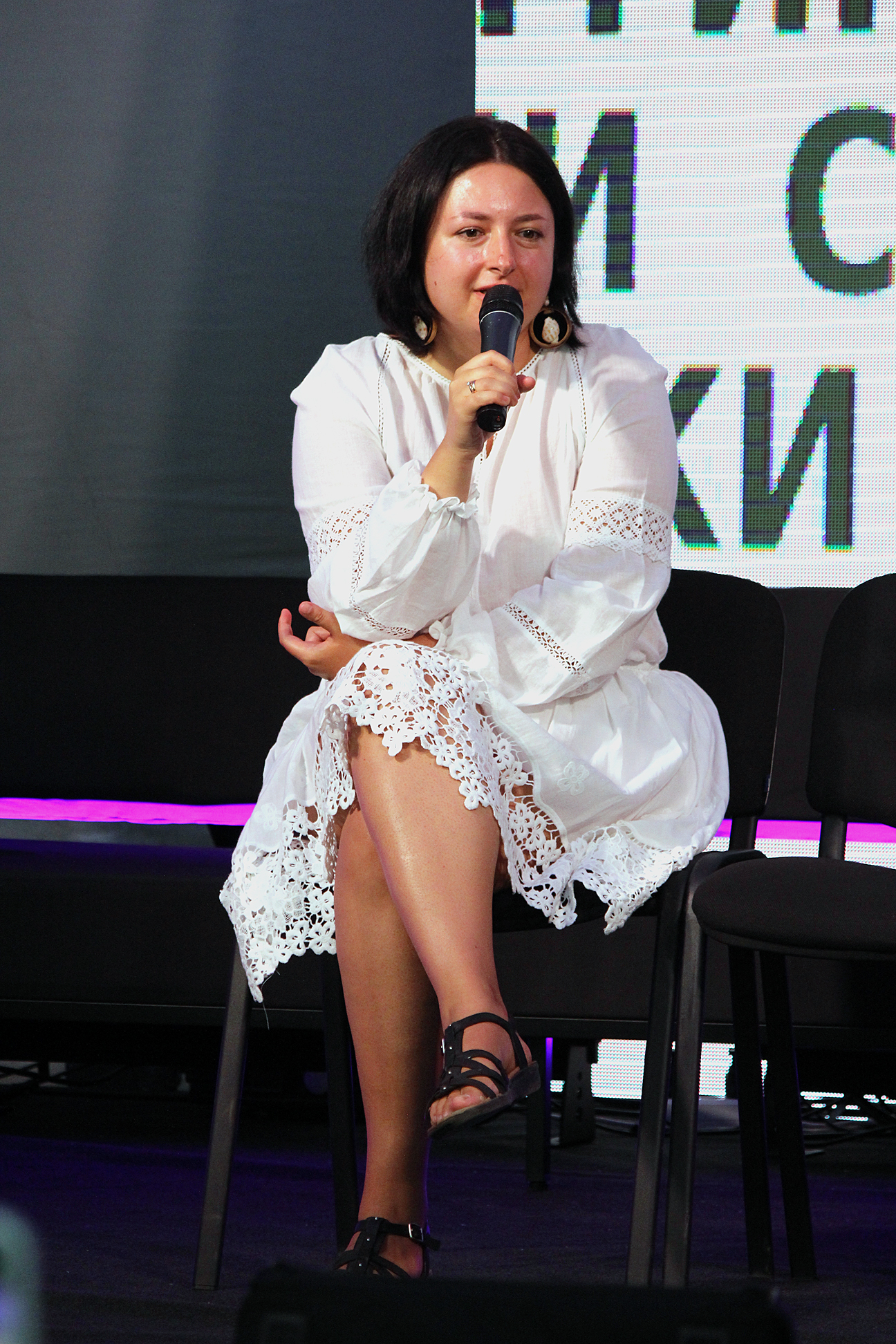
Fediv at the 2021 Arsenal Book Festival

Fediv was the center of controversy in March 2021 when the UCF, led by her, was accused of anomalies in grant distribution by the SKIU. According to SKIU, 20 grant agreements revealed potential infractions, raising concerns about selective financing processes and casting doubt on the distribution of monies to non-cultural endeavors. Fediv declared on 23 March, that she was leaving the race for re-election as executive director of the UCF, despite the public defence of numerous cultural figures, including Ivan Kozlenko. She emphasised the importance of maintaining the stability of the organization and stated that her mission there had ended.

When criminal charges were brought against Fediv in September 2021 for allegedly abusing ₴57 million while she was employed at the UCF, the situation became more heated. According to a State Audit Service of Ukraine (SAS) study, there were problems with the way COVID-19 assistance funds were managed, including underuse and misuse of the cash that was allotted. Fediv vehemently denied any wrongdoing, claiming that the accusations were unjustly based on technicalities rather than serious misuse and denouncing the Ministry of Culture's inaction. A complaint suggesting potential cooperation between the SAS, the Supervisory Board of the UCF, and SKIU representatives was sent to the State Bureau of Investigation in October 2021. Following 2021, there were no updates in the case against Fediv.

== Personal life ==
Fediv is fluent in English, German, Russian, and Polish.

== Awards ==
- Women in Arts Award (2021)
