= Medel Aseo =

Filipino Catholic bishop (b. 1954)

The Most Reverend Medel S. Aseo D.D.
- Bishop of Tagum
- Province: Davao
- See: Tagum
- Appointed: April 7, 2018
- Installed: June 20, 2018
- Predecessor: Wilfredo Manlapaz

Orders
- Ordination: April 7, 1979
- Consecration: June 20, 2018 by Romulo Valles

Personal details
- Born: Medel Sacay Aseo; June 27, 1954 (age 72) Kapalong, Davao del Norte, Philippines
- Residence: Tagum, Philippines
- Education: St. Francis Xavier College Seminary, Ateneo de Manila University
- Motto: Gaudium in Obedientia
- Coat of arms

Styles of Medel S. Aseo
- Reference style: His Excellency; The Most Reverend
- Spoken style: Your Excellency
- Religious style: Bishop

Medel Sacay Aseo (born June 27, 1954) is a Filipino bishop of the Catholic Church who has been serving as the Bishop of the Diocese of Tagum since 2018.

== Early life and education ==
Aseo was born in Kapalong, Davao del Norte, on June 27, 1954. He pursued his seminary education at St. Francis Xavier College Seminary in Davao City, where he completed his philosophy studies. He then continued his theological formation at the St. Francis Xavier Regional Major Seminary in the same city. Later, from 1988 to 1991, he undertook postgraduate studies at the Loyola School of Theology at the Ateneo de Manila University, where he specialized in family ministry.

== Priesthood ==
Aseo was ordained a priest on April 7, 1979, for the Diocese of Tagum. His first assignment was as parochial vicar at Sto. Niño Parish in Panabo, where he served from 1979 to 1980. The following year, he was appointed parish priest in Manay, and later in Cateel both in Davao Oriental, from 1980 to 1983.

In 1983, he was assigned as vice-rector and procurator at the College Seminary of Tagum, where he remained until 1985. He then returned to parish ministry, serving as parish priest in Maragusan, Davao del Norte, from 1986 to 1988. After completing his postgraduate studies at the Loyola School of Theology, he resumed his pastoral work in 1991 as parish priest in Panabo while also serving as diocesan director of the Apostolate for the Family. His administrative responsibilities expanded as he became a vicar forane and a member of the College of Consultors until 1996.

His ministry extended internationally when he was assigned as chaplain for Filipino seafarers in the Archdiocese of Liverpool, Great Britain, from 2003 to 2006. Upon returning to the Philippines, he was appointed parish priest of St. Therese of the Child Jesus Parish in Nabunturan, Compostela Valley (now Davao de Oro), from 2006 to 2007.

From 2008 to 2015, he became a member of the Galilee Center for Priests in Tagaytay City, providing spiritual formation and support for clergy. In 2016, he was named vice-administrator of St. Michael the Archangel Parish in Tagum City, a position he held for a year before being sent to the United States in 2017 as a missionary priest at St. Mary Parish in the Diocese of Greensburg, Pennsylvania.

== Episcopal ministry ==
On April 7, 2018, Pope Francis appointed Aseo as the bishop of the Diocese of Tagum, following the resignation of Wilfredo Manlapaz. His episcopal ordination and installation was held on June 20, 2018, at Christ the King Cathedral in Tagum City. The principal consecrator was Romulo Valles, the Archbishop of Davao.

Catholic Church titles
Preceded by Wilfredo Manlapaz	Bishop of Tagum; 2018–present	Incumbent
