= Filipinos in Greece =

Total population
- 61,681 (2014)

Regions with significant populations
- Athens

Languages
- Tagalog, English; Greek

Religion
- Roman Catholicism, Greek Orthodox

Related ethnic groups
- Filipino people, Overseas Filipinos

Filipinos in Greece consist of migrants from the Philippines to Greece and their descendants. According to official Greek statistics, there were 5,826 Filipinos in Greece in 1991, which declined to 2,000 by 1996. In reality, there were many more working in the country illegally. The Filipino community have set up a school for their children in downtown Athens.

A large proportion are women (81% as of 1999), who generally find employment as domestic workers. The association between Filipinas and domestic work is so strong that a Greek dictionary published in 1998 even defined "Filippineza", a term which literally means Filipina, to be "a domestic worker from the Philippines or a person who performs non-essential auxiliary tasks". Migrants and the Philippine Department of Foreign Affairs protested to the Greek government about the dictionary.

== See also ==
- Greek settlement in the Philippines
- Philippines–Greece relations

== Sources ==
- Iosifides, Theodoros; King, Russell (1999), "Socio-Spatial Dynamics and Exclusion of Three Immigrant Groups in the Athens Conurbation", in Baldwin-Edwards, Martin; Arango, Joaquín (eds.), Immigrants and the informal economy in Southern Europe, Routledge, pp. 186–204, ISBN 978-0-7146-4925-2. A study of Albanian, Egyptian, and Filipino migrants.
- Cañete, Leodinito Y. (2004), "Education Research with Philippine Communities in Greece: Intricacies and Possibilities", in Mutua, Kagendo; Swadener, Beth Blue (eds.), Decolonizing research in cross-cultural contexts: critical personal narratives, State University of New York Press, pp. 135–146, ISBN 978-0-7914-5979-9
