= Philippines–South Africa relations =

- Philippines: South Africa

Philippines–South Africa relations refers to bilateral relations between the Philippines and South Africa. Relations were established in November 1993, with the Philippines maintaining an embassy in Pretoria and South Africa having an embassy in Manila. Relations between the two states remains strong on both bilateral and multilateral levels, and the most influential in some international organisations including the Non-Aligned Movement and the Group of 77.

== Economic ties ==
South Africa is the largest trading partner of the Philippines in Africa and the Philippines ranked South Africa as its 36th largest trading partner in 2008. The visit to Manila by Nelson Mandela, the first black South African President and anti-apartheid icon in March 1997, led to the ratification of the Philippines-South Africa Trade Agreement in 2002.

== Filipino diaspora ==
There are about 1,890 Overseas Filipinos stationed in South Africa, most of them working in the garments and packaging industries, with a minority in the professional sector. Some Filipinos have also intermarried with South Africans and other nationals living in the country. Many Filipinos have migrated to South Africa to also work in the fishing industry, in the health care industry, as skilled workers, or as engineers. In August 2008, the Philippine Department of Foreign Affairs set up the Muntíng Páaralan ("Little School") at the Philippine Embassy in Pretoria, where fourteen Filipino children are enrolled for bimonthly classes. In 2011, Filipinos in South Africa sent over US$6.1 million in remittances back to the Philippines, the largest amount from any African country in 2011.

== Resident diplomatic missions ==
- the Philippines has an embassy in Pretoria.
- South Africa has an embassy in Manila.

== See also ==
- Foreign relations of the Philippines
- Foreign relations of South Africa
- Filipinos in South Africa
