= Filipinos in Switzerland =

Total population
- 10,000

Languages
- English, languages of the Philippines, German (Standard and Swiss), French and Italian

Religion
- Roman Catholicism

Related ethnic groups
- Filipino people, Overseas Filipinos

Filipinos in Switzerland consist of migrants from the Philippines to Switzerland and their descendants.

== Migration history ==
As early as 1975, Switzerland had 188 Philippine citizens living there. By 2005, that number had grown to 3,547. From the 1970s until the 1990s, some Filipinas came to Switzerland as guest workers, primarily in the nursing sectors. In the 1980s, some women came on 10-month work permits, officially to work as cabaret dancers; in reality, many were forced into prostitution. Migration through marriage was another common path to Switzerland. However, after 1992, those married to Swiss citizens no longer automatically acquired Swiss citizenship. The trend of Philippine citizens coming to Switzerland on tourist visas and then overstaying to find work began in the 1990s.

== Employment ==
Almost 5% of the Filipinos in Switzerland are professionals in the medical, legal, and financial fields. Others are domestic workers. Since the Philippine government lifted a ban on deployment of au pairs to Europe, roughly 100 have gone to Switzerland from the Philippines. In 2011, the Philippine Department of Labor and Employment and the Philippine Overseas Employment Administration began talks with the Swiss government regarding the training of health workers from the Philippines.

== Religion ==
Religious groups for Filipinos in Switzerland include the Philippine Catholic Mission of Switzerland in Zurich, the Journey of Hope Simbahang Pilipino in Basel, and the Sisters' Community of Seraphic Love Solothurn. After Switzerland joined the Schengen Area, it became increasingly popular for Filipino Catholics residing in Switzerland to make pilgrimages to famous religious sites in other European countries.

== Social integration ==
In general, Filipinos tend not to have Swiss friends, aside from their colleagues. Filipinos see the Swiss as introverted and feel it is difficult to form friendships with them; also, many Filipinos feel they do not speak German well enough to express themselves freely, and instead feel inhibited when speaking the language. According to Anny Misa Hefti, founder of women's organisation Samahang Pilipina, Filipino migrants also lack interest or involvement in Swiss politics. Philippine ambassador Maria Theresa Lazaro has also been involved in work to raise the status of Filipina women in Switzerland and promote their integration into Swiss society by organising a peer support group and inviting a psychologist to give seminars on self-esteem, leadership, and team-building.

The documentary Luminawa by Swiss director Thomas Luchinger-De Clerq discusses the search for identity by second-generation Kalinga people in Switzerland.

== See also ==
- Philippines–Switzerland relations
- Immigration to Switzerland
- Filipino diaspora
- Filipinos in Austria
- Filipinos in France
- Filipinos in Germany
- Filipinos in Italy

== Sources ==
- Hefti, Anni Misa (2007), "Migrant Issues in Switzerland" (PDF), in Mongaya Hoegsholm, Filomenita (ed.), In De Olde Worlde: Views of Filipino Migrants in Europe, Philippine Social Science Council/Philippine Migration Research Network, pp. 301–318, ISBN 978-971-8514-29-0
