= Filipinos in Nigeria =

Mga Pilipinong nasa Nigeria (Tagalog)
- (Philippines) (Nigeria)

Total population
- 3,000 (2023)

Regions with significant populations
- Lagos, Abuja, Ibadan, Kano and Port Harcourt.

Languages
- Tagalog, English (Philippine and Nigerian), some degree of knowledge of Languages of Nigeria

Religion
- Roman Catholicism, minority of Protestantism, Islam and Irreligion.

Related ethnic groups
- Overseas Filipinos

Filipinos in Nigeria consist largely of migrant workers in the oil industry, though those in the capital city Abuja also work in the education and medical sectors. By mid-2008, their numbers had grown to an estimated 4,500, up from 3,790 in December 2005. They commonly hold skilled construction positions, among them pipe layers, welders, and engineers, and may earn as much as US$10,000 per month; however, they often find themselves the target of violence by local militants.

== History ==
There were Filipinos in Nigeria as early as the 1970s; the Philippine Barangay Society of Nigeria was founded in 1973 in an effort to coordinate the various Philippine community organisations that had already sprouted up around the country. Its offices are located at the Caverton Helicopter Staff Compound in Ikeja, Lagos.

== Violence and travel ban ==
In January 2007, Philippine president Gloria Arroyo imposed a ban on further travel to Nigeria in response to the kidnapping of twenty-four Filipino sailors from a boat in the Niger Delta state of Warri, coming on the heels of nearly a hundred incidents of foreigners being taken hostage in the previous few months. However, workers already in Nigeria were permitted to stay there, and the government indicated that they did not plan to evacuate them. There had been only seven Filipino victims of abductions in Nigeria in all of 2006, compared to the twenty-four in January 2007. The ban was relaxed just two months later, allowing workers with pre-existing contracts to return to Nigeria; by May, the Filipino government estimated the number of workers had grown to 4,500. That month saw the repatriation of 45 Filipinos working for Daewoo Engineering and Construction, after they had been released by gunmen who kidnapped them from their camp in Port Harcourt.

Despite the relaxation of the ban, it remained in place through the end of the year; Filipino workers largely ignored a government appeal to return home (which included the promise of an amnesty for those who had gone to Nigeria undocumented or in violation of the ban), after the announcement that anyone who returned to the Philippines for the Christmas holiday would not be allowed to depart for Nigeria again. The Christmas season in Nigeria was marred by further violence, with one group of nineteen migrant workers attacked twice in two weeks, first on board their ship and then at their hotel, resulting in one death; the survivors were also repatriated to Manila.

Ironically, despite the ban, one Filipina engineer in Nigeria, Esperanza Derpo, was chosen as one of the recipients of the Banaag Award for the Year 2008 Presidential Awards for Filipino Individuals and Organizations Overseas by the Presidential Commission on Filipinos Overseas.

== Crime ==
Filipinos have been involved in a number of incidents of oil theft in Nigeria. In July 2008, 14 Filipinos aboard the MT Lina Panama were arrested on board their vessel and accused of stealing 168,000 tons (150,000 metric tonnes) of crude oil. They were subsequently released on bail. In November 2008, 22 Filipino crews were arrested, aboard the ship MT Akuada for alleged oil theft, commonly known as 'oil bunkering'. 9 were released but 13 crewmen remained in jail awaiting trial. They were tried in Nigerian court and the 13 Filipinos were subsequently convicted and fined. Eventually, the charterer of the ship paid the fine that lead to the release of the Filipinos.

== See also ==
- Nigeria–Philippines relations
- Filipino diaspora
- Immigration to Nigeria
