= Filipinos in South Africa =

Mga Pilipino sa Timog Aprika (Tagalog)

Total population
- 2,200 (2008)

Regions with significant populations
- Western Cape - Cape Town, Kalk Bay; Gauteng - Pretoria, Johannesburg; Free State - Bloemfontein; Kwazulu-Natal - Durban, Newcastle

Languages
- Tagalog, Philippine English, Afrikaans

Religion
- Roman Catholicism · Protestantism · Others

Related ethnic groups
- Filipino people, Overseas Filipinos

Filipinos in South Africa are either migrants or descendants of the Philippines living in South Africa. Roughly half of them live in Gauteng and another 40% in Kalk Bay.

Many Filipinos migrate to South Africa to work in the fishing industry, in the health care industry, as skilled workers, or as engineers.

In August 2008, the Philippine Department of Foreign Affairs set up the Munting Paaralan school at the Philippine Embassy in Pretoria, where fourteen children are enrolled for bimonthly classes.

In 2011, Filipinos in South Africa sent over $6.1 million USD in remittances back to the Philippines, the largest amount from any African country in that year.

== Filipinos in Kalk Bay ==
In the 1870s after a revolution against the Spanish rulers, many Filipinos sought refuge in South Africa, mostly in Kalk Bay. The Filipinos were known for being excellent fishermen, and became part of the growing community in Kalk Bay whose livelihood depended on both fishing and whaling. The Filipinos brought the tradition of fishing to Kalk Bay, mainly living in small flats built on the shore. In 1863 the CSS Alabama landed in Cape Town, which was immortalized by the folk song "Daar kom die Alibama". The ship is said to have brought the first Filipino to Cape Town, a lowly fisherman by the name of Felix Florez, who settled in Kalk Bay. Florez is to have recommended Kalk Bay to his other countrymen as a promising fishing settlement. A fisherman by the name of Lime Simon van der Stel wrote in his journal "The fish which His Honour caught were because of their rare, beautiful colours, and were found to be in incredible numbers. It was so easy to catch them that one could not quickly enough throw the hooks into the water in order to draw them up again." An estimated 80% of people currently living on Kalk Bay are descended from Filipinos. Following the 1872 Filipino revolt against Spain there was another influx of new settlers to Kalk Bay.

After Kalk Bay became crowded and there were not enough houses to hold all the Filipino settlers, in the 1900s and 1910s many Filipino descendants moved to Heathfield or Wynberg, making up a significant portion of the Roman Catholic population in those areas. It is estimated that there were 68 original families from the Philippines, including the Florez, Menigo, de la Cruz, Pepino, Fish, Erispe, Francisco and Fernandez families.

On October 28, 2018 a set of unnamed steps in Kalk Bay were named the "Manila Steps" in honor of the Filipino settlers.

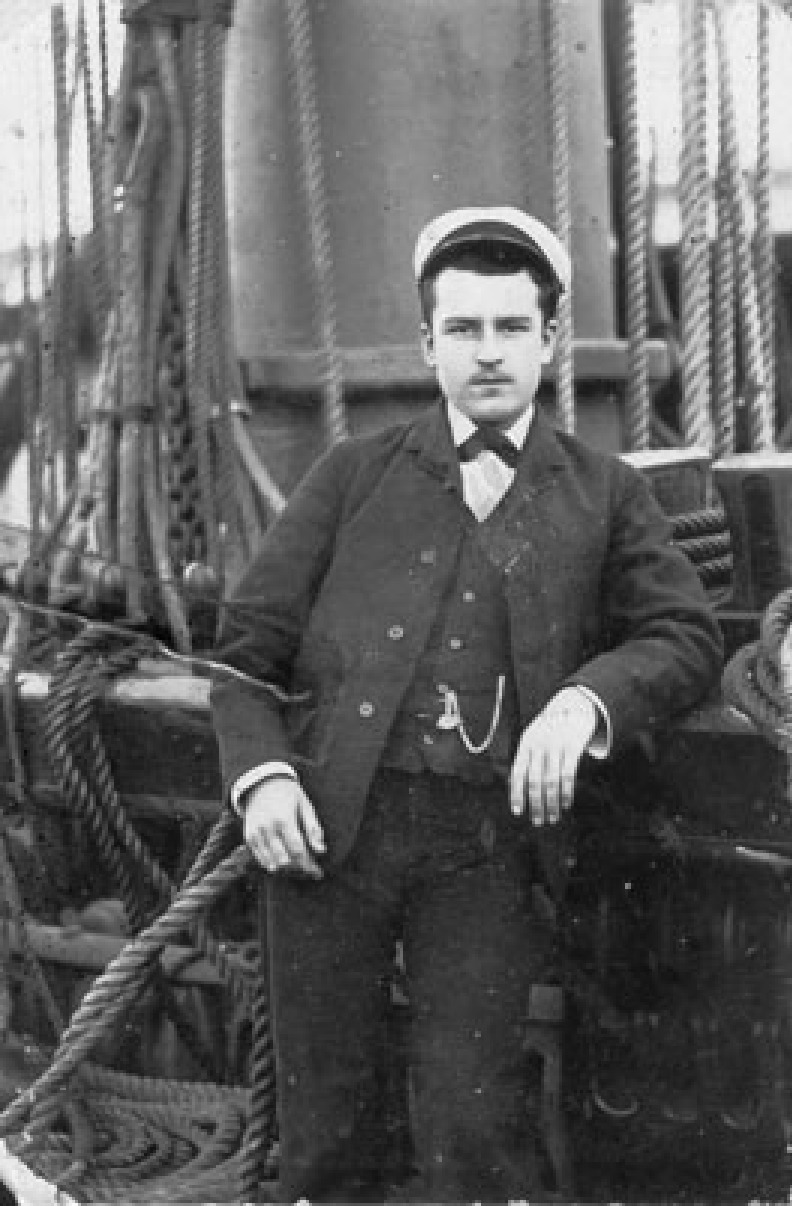
Felix Florez on the CSS Alabama in 1863.

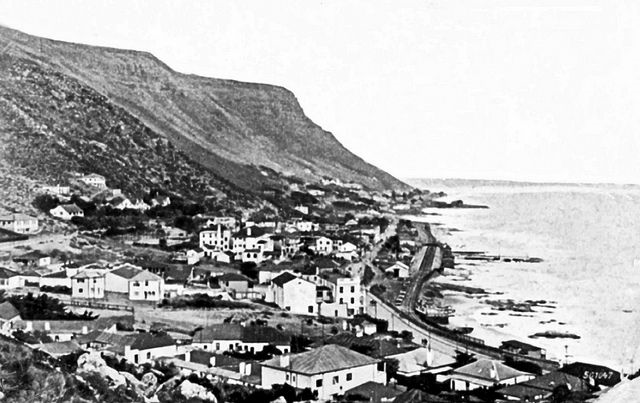
Kalk Bay c.1905

== See also ==
- Philippines–South Africa relations
- Filipino diaspora
- Immigration to South Africa
