= Filipinos in Austria =

Ethnic group

Filipino Austrians
Austro-Filipinos

Total population
- 30,000 estimated 0.34% of the Austrian population (2021)

Regions with significant populations
- Vienna and Lower Austria; The following numbers (from 2020) represent only Filipino Austrians born in the Philippines
- Austria in Total: 13,499 (0.15%)
- Vienna: 8,968 (0.47%)
- Lower Austria: 1,302 (0.08%)
- Upper Austria: 730 (0.05%)
- Salzburg: 701 (0.13%)
- Vorarlberg: 503 (0.13%)
- Styria: 440 (0.04%)
- Tyrol: 412 (0.05%)
- Carinthia: 272 (0.05%)
- Burgenland: 121 (0.04%)

Languages
- German (Austrian), English (American English, Philippine English), Filipino (Tagalog), Visayan languages, Ilocano, Kapampangan, Pangasinan, Bikolano and various other languages of the Philippines

Religion
- Roman Catholicism, Protestant, Iglesia ni Cristo and other denominations Minority: Irreligion

Related ethnic groups
- Overseas Filipinos, Filipinos, Filipino Mestizo

Filipino Austrians (German: Austro-Filipinos or Filipino Österreicher; Filipino: Pilipinong Austriano) are Austrians of full or partial Filipino descent and are part of the so-called Overseas Filipinos. When excluding Afghan, Iraqi and Syrian refugees, Filipinos make up the fourth largest group of Asians within Austria, behind Iranian, Chinese and Indian people and form the largest Southeast-Asian community in the country. The majority of them live in Vienna, the capital of Austria.

It is estimated by the Filipino ambassador to Austria that 30,000 Filipino Austrians currently live in Austria. 13,499 Filipino Austrians were born in the Philippines, with 5,823 of them holding Philippine citizenship.

Little is known about the history of Filipinos in Austria before the 1970s, primarily because immigration records of that era classified Filipinos as either "Other" or "Asian". However, Filipino migration to Austria in relatively high numbers started in the 1970s, when the city government of Vienna initiated a program to recruit Filipino nursing staff to combat the nurse shortage, which still remains politically relevant in Austria.

== History of Filipino overseas employment ==
There were three big waves of emigration from the Philippines to other nations. The first one lasted between 1900 and 1940 when Filipinos left their country to study in the U.S., with many returning without finishing their studies due to cultural and economic hardships. The second wave happened between the 1940s and the 1970s, when many Filipinos moved to the U.S.A. permanently as war veterans, relatives of previous migrants and specialised workers. During the second world war, the U.S. American government strongly encouraged Filipinos to become nurses to work in and for the USA..

The third Philippine emigration wave happened as a result of the 1973 oil crisis and drove many Filipinos to seek employment in gulf states (where a big Filipino diaspora can be found), but also Europe. Under Philippine president Marcos, the situation of Oversea Filipino Workers (OFW) and their employment became a matter of national relevance, which led to the establishment of various governmental institutions. Many of those OFWs were obliged to send 50% to 80% of their monthly income back to their families in the Philippines, which is still common practice among the global Filipino community, although not at this magnitude.

The Philippine Oversea Employment Administration (POEA) reported that the number of OFWs rose from 44,271 in 1987 to 686,461 in 1992, with an average annual growth rate of 11.3%. In 1998, there were already 831,643 Oversea Filipino Workers.

Studies conducted in the 2000s reported that, on average, 30% of Filipino adults, 47% of Filipino adolescents and 60% of Filipino children would like to work abroad.

=== Filipino nurses ===
Filipino nurses are sought after as they are generally considered to be able to communicate well in English, enjoy good college-degree nursing education, are very easy-going and adapt easily, and because the Philippines as seen as an ethical source of nurses. The number of nursing schools in the Philippines rose from 17 in 1950 to 140 in 1970. Ironically, this development put a strain on the Filipino healthcare infrastructure as many hospitals closed due to a lack of nurses - an issue that is still very relevant in the Philippines.

== History of Filipino nurses in Austria ==
In 1973, the Philippine department of Labour and the city of Vienna signed a bilateral agreement that made it easier to recruit Filipino nurses for Austrian hospitals in order to combat the dramatic Austrian nurse shortage. This development marked the beginning of the first Filipino immigration wave to Austria. It was planned that up to 720 Filipino nurses should come to work in Austria. The first 20 Filipino nurses arrived in Vienna on July 17, 1974.

The Austrian government strongly supported their recruitment by paying all expenses for their arrival, sponsoring German language courses, equating Philippine nursing diplomas to Austrian nursing diplomas and signing extendable working contracts of 3-year durations. Many of them used the opportunity to apply for citizenship and bringing their families to start a new life in Austria.

By 1985, there was no longer a need to hire nurses abroad, which marked the end of the bilateral agreement. In 1997, there were 15.000 Filipino citizens working as nurses in Austria, although almost all of them were employed either temporarily or irregularly.

=== Reasons for migration and citizenship ===
Many Filipinos became nurses overseas because of the significantly better wages in comparison to the Philippines which was also important to them as they generally feel responsible for the wellbeing of their families (including relatives) back in the Philippines. The reason why many nurses came to Austria was in many cases due to mere circumstance and the chance to work abroad. Most Filipino nurses hoped to find a job in the U.S., with many knowing almost nothing about Austria, which in turn made Austria seem as a rather uninteresting choice. Many also had friends and relatives who already worked in Austria, which encouraged relatives and friends to seek employment in Austria as well.

Regarding citizenship, many Filipino Austrian nurses applied for Austrian citizenship as to avoid paying taxes in two countries, although some became Austrians through their family members who already worked in Austria or simply fell in love in and with Austria.

== Culture ==
In general, Filipino Austrians have a strong connection to Filipino culture and identity, although their sense of Filipino identity does not clash with their cultural identity as Austrians but rather coexists in various forms. Filipino culture is kept alive though food, language, family and the Filipino Austrian community and their social events.

=== Identity ===
The overwhelming majority of Filipino immigrants see themselves as both Austrian and Filipino. Although they are very much aware of their Filipino roots, they generally also see themselves as Austrians and Austria as their true home, yet keep their cultural roots alive and thriving, without having to compromise on any identity.

Children of Filipino immigrants (referring to both with fully and partial Filipino roots) are in general considered and expected to uphold Filipino culture, traditions and values, while also perfectly blending into Austrian society, in practice sometimes even outweighing their Filipino identity.

However, it is important to keep in mind that each Filipino Austrian defines their own cultural identity differently.

=== Filipino organizations in Austria ===
In April 2008, there were 63 Filipino associations recorded at the Philippine Embassy in Austria, 16 being of purely social, 14 of purely religious and 13 of purely cultural nature.

=== Festivities and social events ===
Filipino culture is celebrated and lived through various festivals and events by the Filipino community in Austria.

==== Barrio Fiesta ====
Annually, Filipinos from all across Austria gather in Vienna to celebrate "Barrio Fiesta" (Village Party), a festival where Filipino Austrians and Non-Filipino Austrians meet to spend time together, have fun, celebrate and actively live the shared Filipino identity and soul.

There are usually many small tents that sell traditional Filipino foods and snacks, toys and various items, but also stands that sell travels and services or belong to the various organizations and act as their meeting point. On a big stage are live music acts, performances and short speeches in either German, English or Tagalog. Normally the many Filipino organizations also present themselves in short march parades over the festival grounds (traditionally a soccer field), perform dances. Each parade starts by singing both the Philippine and Austrian anthems.

==== Sinulog and other religious events ====
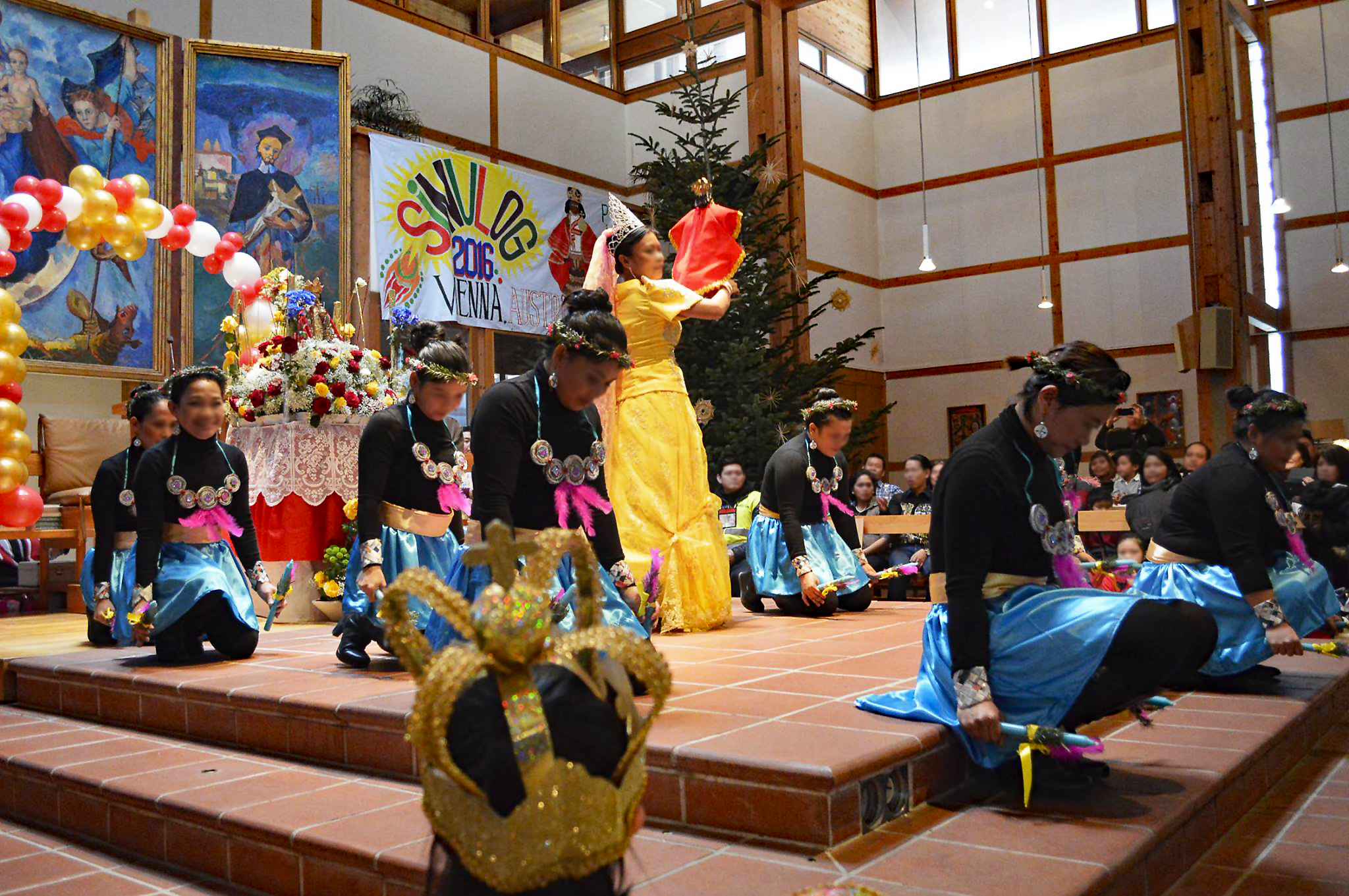
Sinulog Celebration in Vienna 2016

Regarded as one of the most important religious Filipino festivals, the arrival of Christianity in the Philippines is regularly celebrated by Filipino Austrians in churches (primarily in Vienna). Usually there are also Filipino preachers preaching in Tagalog, English and performances of traditional dances.

Some Filipino organizations travel together to celebrate various Saint's days, organize Christmas and Easter festivities or hold get-togethers in churches.

==== Independence Day ====
Filipino Austrians usually organize annual events to celebrate the Philippine Independence Day. There are various kinds of festivals, from official commemorations to concerts and gala nights.

==== Other festivals ====
Each Filipino association usually organizes their own festivals/get-togethers in addition to the other bigger Filipino festivals. As stated above, these organizations can focus on a religious aspect or an ethno-linguistic aspect of the Philippines and its culture. Sometimes there are also regional, nationwide, or international Filipino pageants being held.

=== Filipino heritage and identity of Filipino Austrians ===
In contrast to the knowledge about experiences of 2nd and 3rd generation Filipinos with completely Filipino heritage, not much is yet known about mixed-race Filipino Austrians.

According to the Philippine Sociological Review, most 2nd and 3rd generation Filipino Austrians see themselves more as Austrians rather than Filipinos and speak German fluently, in contrast to some 1st generation Filipino immigrants. While there is a clear awareness of their Filipino roots, many of those Filipino Austrians prefer embracing their "Austrianess" because of perceived problematic social dynamics within the Filipino community in Austria and abroad and their apparent lack of personal freedom in the Filipino value system. However, those standpoints represent only a fraction of the 2nd and 3rd generation of Filipino Austrians.

The Center of Filipino and Austrian culture and language (Sentro ng Kultura at Wika ng Austria at Pilipinas or Zentrum für österreichische und philippinische Kultur und Sprache), which is an organization led by voluntary members of the Filipino Austrian community, has published in February 2022 "Common Diversities junge Filipin@s im deutschsprachigen Raum". It is the first book written by and about second and third-generation Filipinos in German-speaking countries in German and English. It is a collage of the young authors' personal insights supported by their research and scientific method analysis on why their parent(s) migrated and what role does culture play in their identity formation.

== Demographics ==
There are currently no records about how many Austrians have Filipino roots. The only data presently available is how many Austrians were born in the Philippines and how many people in Austria have Philippine citizenship.

Philippine citizens in Austria (at the start of each year)
	2002	2003	2004	2005	2006	2007	2008	2009	2010	2011	2012	2013	2014	2015	2016	2017	2018	2019	2020	2021
Filipino Citizens in Austria	3,453	3,562	3,699	3,825	4,011	4,158	4,341	4,526	4,676	4,799	4,907	5,055	5,231	5,327	5,494	5,560	5,638	5,704	5,823	5,823
Percentage of all Non-citizens (including refugees)	0.47% of 730,261	0.48% of 746,753	0.49% of 754,261	0.49% of 774,401	0.50% of 796,666	0.52% of 804,779	0.52% of 829,679	0.53% of 860,004	0.53% of 883,579	0.53% of 913,203	0.52% of 951,429	0.50% of 1,004,268	0.49% of 1,066,114	0.46% of 1,146,078	0.43% of 1,267,674	0.41% of 1,341,930	0.40% of 1,395,880	0.40% of 1,438,923	0.39% of 1,486,223	0.38% of 1,531,262

Age and gender of Philippines-born Filipino Austrians
	Total	Females (2020)	Males (2020)	Age 0 to 5	Age 6 to 14	Age 15 to 17	Age 18 to 24	Age 25 to 34	Age 35 to 49	Age 50 to 64	Age 65+
(Filipino) Austrians born in the Philippines	13,449	9,110	4,339	74	320	179	574	1,623	3,916	4,681	2,082

== Notable people ==
- David Alaba (footballer)
- Vincent Bueno (singer)
- Lukas Janisch (The Voice Kids Germany 2016 winner)
- Melanie Mader (Miss Earth Austria 2018)
- Alberto Nodale (Mister World Austria 2019)
- Stephan Palla (soccer player)
- Johannes Pietsch (singer)
- Rowby-John Rodriguez (darts player)
- Rusty-Jake Rodriguez (darts player)

== See also ==
- Overseas Filipinos
- Austria–Philippines relations
- Immigration to Austria
- Filipinos in Germany
- Filipinos in Italy
- Filipinos in Switzerland
