= Greek settlement in the Philippines =

Greeks in the Philippines
Total population
- 575 (2000 Philippines census)

Regions with significant populations
- Manila

Languages
- Spanish; Filipino; Greek

Religion
- Greek Orthodox Church Catholic Church

Related ethnic groups
- Greek people, Spanish Filipino

Greek settlement in the Philippines is a small community of descendants of ethnic Greeks who settled the country since the Spanish colonization of the country. The Greek community in the Philippines also includes Filipino citizens of Greek ancestry along with Greek expatriates and immigrants and their descendants of full or partial Greek ancestry. This also includes a small number of Greek Americans, Greek Australians and Greek Cypriots.

== Overview ==
According to some historical accounts, there were already Greek settlers in the country as early as the 18th century. Most were sailors, traders, and fishermen.

During the early 20th century, a number of Greek sailors and immigrants came to the country and settled. One group came to the city of Legazpi. Their descendants on the island of Luzon make up no more than 10 families, who retain their Greek identities and have become distinguished public figures and intellectuals in the community.

Adamson University in Manila was founded by a Greek immigrant, George Lucas Adamson and his first cousins Alexander and George Athos (Adamopoulos) Adamson. He also founded the first Greek Orthodox chapel in the Philippines, however Alexander Adamopoulos Adamson founded the Hellenic Orthodox Foundation which built the first true Greek Orthodox Church in Manila called the Annunciation of Theotokos and in the year 2000 His All Holiness Patriarch Bartholomew visited the Philippines for the first time to consecrate the Annunciation of Theotokos. Alexander (Adamopoulos) Adamson became a Filipino citizen in 1934 and founded two paper mills, and a shipping company called Adamson PHil Inc. Alexander Athos Adamson was the Honorary Consul General of Greece in the Philippines before dying in 1993. Currently Greek immigrants and expatriates come into the country to work in businesses or enter as diplomats, tourists, or as friends or family of Filipinos. The Greek community in the Philippines also helps with the Philippine Orthodox Church (with the help of the Hellenic Orthodox Community-Foundation Inc Of Philippines). However, currently the Greek population in the Philippines is officially unknown but it is estimated that there are about a few hundred Greeks currently residing in the capital and Legazpi City, the location of the Exarchate of the Philippines. But during 2013 the Greek embassy estimated about 120 Greeks permanently residing in Philippines as immigrants, migrants and expats. Most of them work in shipping and trade, most of them are married to Filipinos and have a permanent residency in the Philippines.

== Notable Filipinos of Greek descent ==
- Jose Manuel Estela Stilianopoulos
- Phytos Ramirez
- Sofia Adamson

== See also ==
- Adamson University
- Filipinos in Greece
- Philippines–Greece relations
- Philippine Orthodox Church
