= Filipinos in Nepal =

Total population
- 300 (2011)

Regions with significant populations
- Kathmandu

Languages
- English (Philippine and Nepali); Tagalog; Nepali

Religion
- Christianity; Roman Catholicism

Related ethnic groups
- Overseas Filipino

Filipinos in Nepal consists of expatriates from the Philippines to Nepal. As of March 2011, there were about 300 Filipinos living in the country and they comprise mostly of professionals, skilled workers, volunteers, missionaries and spouses of Nepalis or other nationals.

== Organizations ==
The Filipino Community in Nepal or FCN is an organization that organizes Philippine events and activities in order to raise money to upgrade communities in Nepal.

== See also ==
- Nepalese people in the Philippines
