= Philippine School in Greece =

- Φιλιππινέζικη Σχολή της Ελλάδας

Location
- 15 Thimaton Polemou, Kareas Vyronas, Athens, Greece 16233 Athens, Greece; Vironas; Greece
- Coordinates: 37.9452545°N 23.767929900000013°E

Information
- Type: Philippine international school
- Established: 1997

Philippine School in Greece (PSG, Greek: Φιλιππινέζικη Σχολή της Ελλάδας), formerly the Katipunan Philippine Cultural Academy-Philippine School (KAPHILCA-PSG), is a Philippine international school in Vyronas, Attica, Greece; it was previously in Ambelokipi, Athens. The Commission on Filipinos Overseas (CFO) supervises the school, which operates under the Cultural Section of the Philippine embassy in Athens. It is Europe's sole Philippine international school.

== History ==
It was established on September 9, 1997, and on June 29, 1999, it was accredited by the Philippine Department of Education. It was established after a visit of Fidel V. Ramos, former President of the Philippines to Athens in June 1997.

As of 2010, about 185 students are enrolled.

== See also ==
- Greece–Philippines relations
