= Filipinos in China =

Filipinos in China 在华菲律宾人 Mga Pilipino sa Tsina
Total population
- Mainland China: 12,254; Macau: 30,000; Hong Kong: 140,000

Regions with significant populations
- Hong Kong, Macau, Beijing, Guangzhou, Shanghai, Xiamen

Languages
- Spanish, Filipino, English, other languages of the Philippines, Chinese (Cantonese, Mandarin)

Religion
- Roman Catholicism

Related ethnic groups
- Overseas Filipinos

There are a significant number of Filipinos in China consisting of migrants and expatriates from the Philippines to the People's Republic of China.

== Employment ==
Many domestic workers from the Philippines have been coming to China to work as maids. Figures from the Philippines government in 2009 shows that mainland China has become the top destination for Filipino maids seeking work overseas as Chinese families are willing to employ them for better household services and for their fluency in the English language.

== Distribution ==
=== Hong Kong ===
There are around 140,000 Filipinos in Hong Kong, many of whom work as foreign domestic helpers.

=== Macau ===
At the end of December 2023, Filipino non-resident workers in Macau numbered 28,800. Most of them are employed in the hospitality, gambling, and construction industries.

=== Mainland China ===
Based on records from the Philippine Department of Foreign Affairs, there were about 12,254 overseas Filipinos in mainland China. Most of them live in cities such as Beijing (2,492), Chongqing (164), Guangzhou (4,564), Shanghai (4,264) and Xiamen (7,707).

== See also ==
- China–Philippines relations
- Chinese Filipino
