= Pakistan–Philippines relations =

- Pakistan: Philippines

Pakistan–Philippines relations refers to bilateral relations between Pakistan and the Philippines.

== History ==
The Philippines established diplomatic relations with Pakistan on September 8, 1949, through the opening of a Philippine Consulate in Pakistan. Following the diplomatic visit of Pakistan Prime Minister Huseyn Shaheed Suhrawardy to the Philippines in May 1957 the Philippine Consulate in Karachi was elevated into an embassy. Pakistan also opened an embassy in Manila, and the Philippines later moved its embassy to Islamabad.

== Trade links ==
Bilateral trade between the two countries in 2006 was around US$70 million. With Philippine imports from Pakistan worth more than US$42.3 million, mostly including garments and pharmaceutical drugs. Philippine exports to Pakistan are valued at about US$28.8 million in 2006. Pakistan-Philippines Business Council was created to promote trade and investment opportunities between the two countries. In 2021 Pakistan exports to the Philippine were valued at about US$142.3 million, and the Imports were valued at US$74.4 million.

== Migration ==
As of November 2016, an estimated 1,543 Filipinos in Pakistan which includes 180 permanent residents married to Pakistani nationals, 728 documented working visa and 635 irregular and undocumented residents.

Filipinos in Pakistan are mostly professionals, such as engineers who work in IT and US Embassy, hotel staff, nurses, therapists, religious missionaries, those employed in textile mills and road construction projects, and workers from UN and other international organizations. There are also female domestic helpers and Filipino nationals married to Pakistanis.

== Defense cooperation ==
Pakistan is fighting a guerrilla war against Tehrik-i-Taliban Pakistan, and so is the Philippines fighting an insurgency war against MILF, both the countries therefore face a common terrorism threat. Pakistan and the Philippines have signed a memorandum of understanding serving as a "legal framework to facilitate cooperation and inter-operability between the security, intelligence and law enforcement agencies of the two countries".

== Bilateral visit ==
Then-Pakistani Prime Ministers Huseyn Shaheed Suhrawardy (May 1957), Mohammad Khan Junejo (May 1988), and Benazir Bhutto (February 1995) made visits to the Philippines. In July 1962, then-Philippine President Diosdado Macapagal visited Pakistan.

In 2005, then-President Pervez Musharraf was the first Pakistani head of state officially to visit the Philippines, hosted by then-President Gloria Macapagal Arroyo.

== Helicopter crash in Pakistan ==
On 8 May 2015, Philippine Ambassador Domingo Lucenario, Jr. was killed in a helicopter crash in Naltar Valley in Gilgit-Baltistan, Pakistan.

== See also ==
- Filipinos in Pakistan
- Queneerich Rehman - Notable Pakistani-Filipino.
