= Philippines–Switzerland relations =

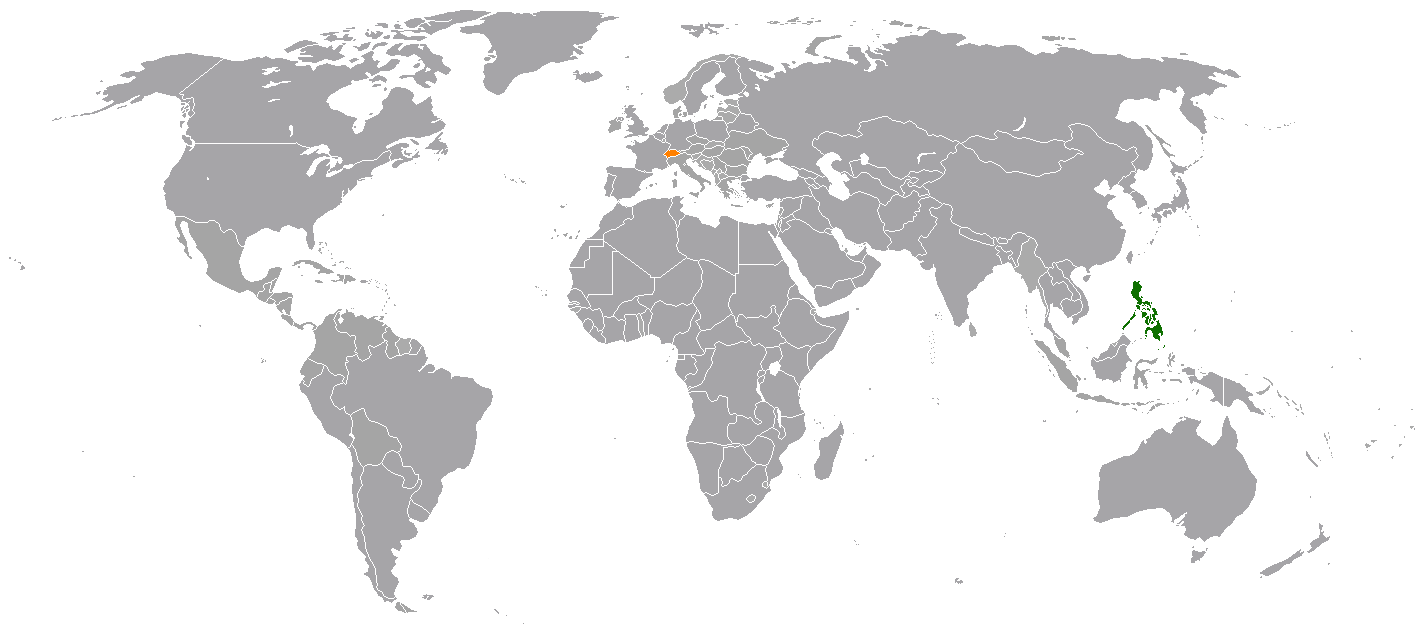

- Philippines: Switzerland

Philippines–Switzerland relations refers to foreign relations between the Philippines and Switzerland. The Philippines has an embassy in Bern and Switzerland has an embassy in Manila.

== History ==
Bilateral and diplomatic relations between the Philippines and Switzerland may be traced back to the early 1800s when Swiss traders, missionaries and travelers ventured to East Asia. The opening of official Swiss representation in the Philippines was first considered by the Swiss Federal Council in 1851. In March 1862, The Swiss government opened its first representation in all of Asia in the Philippines. A month later, the Swiss Consulate in Manila opened its doors. Under the direction of Peter Jenny, Switzerland's first Consul General in the Philippines, the official relations between the two entities were launched.

On July 4, 1946, Switzerland officially recognized the Philippines as a country. In 1957, formal diplomatic relations between the two countries were established.

== Economic relations ==
Trade and investment relations flourish with Switzerland as one of the top ten investors in the Philippines with more than 60 Swiss companies employing at least 15,000 Filipinos locally in the Southeast Asian country. Philippine President Benigno Aquino III and Swiss President Eveline Widmer-Schlumpf discussed the trade relations between the Philippines and Switzerland during the bilateral talks held at the 9th Asia-Europe Meeting in Vientiane in Laos. The two leaders agreed to convene the Philippines-Switzerland Joint Economic Commission a consultation to facilitate bilateral discussions on trade and investment cooperation.

== Others ==
Philippine ambassador Maria Theresa Lazaro has also been involved in work to raise the status of Filipina women in Switzerland and promote their integration into Swiss society by organising a peer support group and inviting a psychologist to give seminars on self-esteem, leadership, and team-building. The documentary Luminawa by Swiss director Thomas Luchinger-De Clerq discusses the search for identity by second-generation Kalinga people in Switzerland.

== Immigration ==
As of 2007, There are more than 10,000 Filipinos in Switzerland. As of 2012, There are 3,140 Swiss nationals residing in the Philippines, with 1,664 of them holding dual citizenship. The Swiss community in the Philippines has organized a club based in Manila.

== See also ==
- Foreign relations of the Philippines
- Foreign relations of Switzerland
- Filipinos in Switzerland
