= Overseas Filipinos =

Filipino diaspora

Mga Pilipino sa Ibayong-dagat
- Map of the Filipino diaspora in the world

Total population
- 15 million (2019) figures below are for various years, per individual supporting sources cited.

Regions with significant populations
- United States: 4,640,313 (2023) (Filipino ancestry and immigrants)
- Canada: 957,355 (2021)
- United Arab Emirates: 919,819 (2013)
- Saudi Arabia: 725,893 (2022)
- Australia: 408,836 (2021)
- Japan: 332,293 (2024)
- Kuwait: 276,000 (2018)
- Malaysia: 245,000 (2009)
- Qatar: 240,000 (2017)
- Singapore: 203,243 (2013)
- France: 150,000-200,000 (2020)
- Spain: 200,000 (2018)
- Hong Kong: 186,869 (2016)
- United Kingdom: 164,000 (2021 UK census)
- Italy: 158,926 (2023 Italian census)
- New Zealand: 108,297 (2023)
- Germany: 65,000 (2008)
- South Korea: 41,000-63,000 (2004-2015)
- Jordan: 40,538 (2020)
- Lebanon: 33,424 (2020)
- Sweden: 24,456 (2018)
- Norway: 18,000 (2013)
- Finland: 12,770 (2023)
- Croatia: 12,000 (2025)
- Denmark: 8,000 (2016)
- Cayman Islands: 7,759 (2024)
- Iceland: 2,000 (2012)

An overseas Filipino (Filipino: Pilipino sa ibayong-dagat) is a person of full or partial Filipino origin who trace their ancestry back to the Philippines but are living and working outside of the country. This term generally applies to both people of Filipino ancestry and citizens abroad. As of 2019, there were over 15 million Filipinos overseas.

== Population ==
In 2013, the Commission on Filipinos Overseas (CFO) estimated that approximately 10.2 million people of Filipino descent lived or worked abroad. This number constitutes about 11 percent of the total population of the Philippines. It is one of the largest diaspora populations, spanning over 100 countries.

The Overseas Filipino Workers (OFWs) tend to be young and gender-balanced. Based on a survey conducted in 2011, the demographics indicate how the 24-29 age group constitutes 24 percent of the total and is followed by the 30-34 age group (23 percent) working abroad. Male OFWs account for 52 percent of the total OFW population. The slightly smaller percentage of the female overseas workers tend to be younger than their male counterparts. Production workers and service workers account for more than 80 percent of the labor outflows by 2010 and this number is steadily increasing, along with the trend for professional workers, who are mainly nurses and engineers. Filipino seamen, overseas Filipino workers in the maritime industry, make an oversize impact on the global economy, making up a fifth to a quarter of the merchant marine crews, who are responsible for the movement of the majority of goods in the global economy.

The OFW population is consistently increasing through the years and this is partly attributed to the government's encouragement of the outflow of contractual workers as evidenced in policy pronouncements, media campaigns, and other initiatives. For instance, it describes the OFWs as the heroes of the nation, encouraging citizens to take pride in these workers.

== Economic impact ==
In 2012, the Bangko Sentral ng Pilipinas (BSP), the central bank of the Philippines, expected official remittances coursed through banks and agents to grow 5% over 2011 to US$21 billion, but official remittances constitute only a fraction of all remittances.

Remittances by unofficial, including illegal, channels are estimated by the Asian Bankers Association to be 30 to 40% higher than the official BSP figure.

In 2011, remittances were US$20.118 billion.

In 2012, approximately 80% of the remittances came from only seven countries—United States, Canada, the United Kingdom, UAE, Saudi Arabia, Singapore, and Japan.

In 2018, remittance had increased to $31 billion, which was nearly 10% of the GDP of the Philippines.

In 2019, Overseas Filipinos sent back $32.2 billion to the Philippines.

== Issues ==
=== Employment conditions ===
Employment conditions overseas are relevant to the individual worker and their families as well as for the sending country and its economic growth and well-being. Poor working conditions for Filipinos hired abroad include long hours, low wages and few chances to visit family. Evidence suggests that these women cope with the emotional stress of familial separation in one of two ways: first, in domestic care situations, they substitute their host-family's children for their own in the love and affection they give, and second, they actively considered the benefit their earnings would have on their children's future. Women often face disadvantages in their employment conditions as they tend to work in elder/child care and as domestics. These occupations are considered low skilled and require little education and training, thereby regularly facing poor working conditions. Women facing just working conditions are more likely to provide their children with adequate nutrition, better education and sufficient health. There is a strong correlation between women's rights and the overall well-being of children. It is therefore a central question to promote women's rights in order to promote children's capabilities.

According to a statement made in 2009 by John Leonard Monterona, the Middle East coordinator of Migrante, a Manila-based OFW organization, every year, an unknown number of Filipinos in Saudi Arabia were then "victims of sexual abuses, maltreatment, unpaid salaries, and other labor malpractices".

==== Government policy ====
Philippine Labor Migration Policy has historically focused on removing barriers for migrant workers to increase accessibility for employment abroad. Working conditions among Filipinos employed abroad varies depending on whether the host country acknowledges and enforces International labor standards. The standards are set by the ILO, which is an UN agency that 185 of the 193 UN members are part of. Labor standards vary greatly depending on host country regulations and enforcement. One of the main reasons for the large differences in labor standards is due to the fact that ILO only can register complaints and not impose sanctions on governments. Returning overseas Filipinos are known as "Balikbayans".

Emigration policies tend to differ within countries depending on if the occupation is mainly dominated by men or women. Occupations dominated by men tend to be driven by economic incentives whereas emigration policies aimed at women traditionally tend to be value driven, adhering to traditional family roles that favors men's wage work. As women are regularly seen as symbols of national pride and dignity, governments tend to have more protective policies in sectors dominated by women. These policies risk to increase gender inequality in the Philippines and thereby this public policy work against women joining the workforce. Female OFWs most often occupy domestic positions. However, some researchers argue that the cultural trends of female migrancy have the potential to destabilize the gender inequality of the Filipino culture. Evidence suggests that in intact, heterosexual families wherein the wife-mother works overseas, Filipino fathers have the potential to take on greater roles in care-giving to their children, though seldom few actually do. Other researchers report that these situations lead to abuse, particularly of older daughters, who face increased pressure and responsibility in the mother's absence. Likewise, the "reversal of breadwinning and caregiving roles between migrant wives and left-behind husbands" more often results in tension regarding family finances and the role each spouse should play in decision making.

The Philippine government has recently opened up their public policy to promote women working abroad since the world's demand for domestic workers and healthcare workers has increased. This has led to the government reporting a recent increase in women emigrating from the Philippines. A healthcare problem arises as migrating women from the Philippines and other developing countries often create a nursing shortage in the home country. The nurse to patient ratio is down to one nurse to between 40 and 60 patients, in the 1990s, the ratio was one nurse to between 15 and 20 patients. It seems inevitable that the healthcare sector loses experienced nurses as the emigration is increasing. The Japan-Philippines Economic Partnership Agreement is seen as a failure by most since only 7% of applicants or 200 nurses a year has been accepted on average – mainly due to resistance by domestic stakeholders and failed program implementation. The result is a "lose-lose" outcome where Philippine workers fail to leverage their skills and a worldwide shortage persists. Despite the fact that Japan has an aging population and many Filipinos want to work in Japan, a solution has not yet been found. The Japanese Nursing Association supports "equal or better" working conditions and salaries for Filipino nurses. In contrast, Yagi propose more flexible wages to make Filipinos more attractive on the Japanese job market.

Results from a focus group in the Philippines shows that the positive impacts from migration of nurses is attributed to the individual migrant and his/her family, while the negative impacts are attributed to the Filipino healthcare system and society in general. In order to fill the nursing shortage in the Philippines, suggestions have been made by several NGOs that nursing-specializing Filipino workers overseas, locally known as "Overseas Filipino Workers" (OFWs), return to the country to train local nurses, for which program training would be required in order for the Philippines to make up for all its nurses migrating abroad.

==== Host country policies ====
Wealthier households derive a larger share of their income from abroad. This might suggest that government policies in host countries favor capital-intensive activities. Even though work migration is mainly a low and middle class activity, the high-income households are able to derive a larger share of their income from abroad due to favorable investment policies. These favorable investment policies causes an increase in income inequalities and do not promote domestic investments that can lead to increased standard of living. This inequality threatens to halt the economic development as investments are needed in the Philippines and not abroad in order to increase growth and well-being. A correlation between successful contribution to the home country's economy and amounted total savings upon the migrants return has been found, therefore it is important to decrease income inequalities while attracting capital from abroad to the Philippines.

Many host governments of OFWs have protective policies and barriers making it difficult to enter the job market. Japan has been known for rigorous testing of Filipinos in a way that make them look reluctant to hold up their part of the Japan-Philippines Economic Partnership Agreement and solely enjoy the benefit of affordable manufacturing in the Philippines, not accepting and educating OFWs.

=== Return migration ===
Returning migrant workers are often argued to have a positive effect on the home economy since they are assumed to gain skills and return with a new perspective. Deskilling has caused many Filipino workers to return less skilled after being assigned simple tasks abroad, this behavior creates discouragement for foreign workers to climb the occupational ladder. Deskilling of labor is especially prevalent among women who often have few and low skill employment options, such as domestic work and child or elder care. Other occupations that recently has seen an increase in deskilling are doctors, teachers and assembly line workers.

To underline what a common problem this deskilling is: Returning migrant workers are calling for returnee integration programs, which suggests that they do not feel prepared to be re-integrated in the domestic workforce.

As the Philippines among other countries who train and export labor repeatedly has faced failures in protecting labor rights, the deskilling of labor has increased on a global scale. A strong worldwide demand for healthcare workers incentivizes Filipinos to emigrate. The result is a no-win situation for the sending and receiving country. The receiving countries lose as skilled workers are not fully utilizing their skills while the home country simultaneously experience a shortage of workers in emigrating prone sectors.

== Countries and territories with Filipino populations ==
Map of the Filipino diaspora in the world (includes people with Filipino ancestry or citizenship). Philippines 1,000,000+ 100,000+ 10,000+ 1,000+

- Afghanistan: As of 2021, there are estimated to be around 18 Filipinos remaining in Afghanistan, mostly working for Doctors Without Borders who chose to stay following repatriation efforts.
- Albania: As of 2025, there were 2,401 registered Filipinos holding residence permits in Albania.
- Algeria: As of 2021, there are around 9,243 Filipinos in Algeria, mostly engineers and technicians in the oil and infrastructure sectors. See Foreign communities in Algeria.
- Andorra: As of 2025, there were around 700 Filipinos in Andorra.
- Angola: As of 2025, there are over 10,000 Filipino professionals and skilled workers in Angola actively employed across various sectors including manufacturing, mining, construction, fisheries, and infrastructure development, according to a report by the Philippine News Agency (PNA).
- Antigua and Barbuda: As of 2025, there are around 50 Filipinos in Antigua and Barbuda.
- Argentina: As of 2023, there are around 223 Filipinos in Argentina, reflecting a slight upward trend recently.
- Armenia: As of 2017, there were 22,007 Filipinos in Armenia.
- Aruba: There are around 2,529 Filipinos in Aruba.
- Australia: In the 2016 Census, there were 232,386 Filipino Australians.
- Austria: As of 2018, the Filipino community in Austria numbered roughly 30,000. See Filipinos in Austria.
- Azerbaijan: As of 2017, There are currently around 3,500 Filipinos in Azerbaijan, with the influx of Overseas Filipino Workers (OFWs) steadily increasing due to growing social media communities for binational families and expanding job opportunities in Baku's oil and service sectors.
- The Bahamas: As of 2010, there were 2,000 Filipinos in The Bahamas.
- Bahrain: As of 2020, there were 55,790 Filipinos in Bahrain.
- Bangladesh: As of 2017, there are around 421 Filipinos in Bangladesh.
- Barbados: There are 13 registered Filipinos in Barbados.
- Belarus: There are around 60 to 120 Filipinos in Belarus.
- Belgium: As of 2013, there were 12,224 in Filipinos in Belgium.
- Belize: There are around 97 Filipinos in Belize according to the Department of Foreign Affairs, though local census data registers a smaller permanent resident population.
- Benin: As of 2017, there are around 15 Filipinos in Benin.
- Bermuda: There are approximately 1,999 Filipinos living and working in Bermuda.
- Bhutan: As of 2021, there were 4 Filipinos in Bhutan. Due to strict immigration laws that prohibit general labor migration, the remaining individuals are highly specialized experts in education or environment invited by the government, or contracted technicians at ultra-luxury resorts.
- Bolivia: As of 2017, there are around 39 Filipinos in Bolivia.
- Bosnia-Herzegovina As of 2026, there are approximately 100 Filipinos in Bosnia-Herzegovina.
- Botswana: As of 2017, there are around 221 Filipinos in Botswana.
- Brazil: As of 2025, there were about 33,483 Filipinos in Brazil.
- Brunei: As of 2018, there were over 20,000 Filipinos living in Brunei.
- Bulgaria: As of 2020, there are around 17 Filipinos in Bulgaria.
- Burundi: As of 2017, there are around 2 Filipinos in Burundi.
- Cambodia: As of 2017, there are around 5,402 Filipinos in Cambodia.
- Canada: As of 2021, there were 957,355 Filipinos in Canada. See Filipino Canadians.
- Cape Verde: As of 2017, there are around 25 Filipinos in Cape Verde.
- Cayman Islands: As of 2010, there were 4,119 Filipinos in Cayman Islands.
- Chad: There are around 45 Filipinos in Chad, mostly working in humanitarian aid organizations and international infrastructure projects.
- Chile: As of 2025, there were 1,017 Filipinos in Chile.
- China: As of 2021, there were 12,254 Filipinos in China (Mainland).
  - Hong Kong: As of 2016 Census, there were 186,869 Filipinos in Hong Kong.
  - Macau: As of 2012, there were 30,000 Filipinos in Macau.
- Colombia: As of 2017, there are around 180 Filipinos in Colombia.
- Comoros: There are around 15 Filipinos in the Comoros, primarily employed in the maritime, tourism, and retail sectors.
- Democratic Republic of the Congo: As of 2019, there are 25 Filipinos in the Democratic Republic of the Congo.
- Cook Islands: As of 2017, there are around 230 Filipinos in Cook Islands.
- Costa Rica: As of 2017, there around 276 Filipinos in Costa Rica.
- Croatia: As of 2025, there are over 12,000 Filipinos in Croatia.
- Cuba: As of 2010, there were 9 Filipinos in Cuba.
- Curaçao: As of 2024, there are approximately 75 Filipinos in Curaçao, mostly serving in the drydock maritime industry and hospitality sectors.
- Cyprus: As of 2022, there are about 18,000 Filipinos in Cyprus.
- Czech Republic: As of 2024, there are around 10,418 Filipinos in the Czech Republic.
- Denmark: As of 2016, there were at least 8,000 Filipinos in Denmark.
- Djibouti: As of 2008, there are now about 200 Filipinos in Djibouti.
- Dominican Republic: As of 2017, there are around 58 Filipinos in the Dominican Republic.
- Ecuador: As of 2017, there are around 138 Filipinos in Ecuador.
- Egypt: As of 2020, there were 5,717 Filipinos in Egypt.
- El Salvador: As of 2017, there are around 45 Filipinos in El Salvador.
- Equatorial Guinea: As of 2019, there are 493 Filipinos in Equatorial Guinea.
- Eritrea: As of 2017, there are around 2 Filipinos in Eritrea.
- Estonia: As of 2017, there are around 41 Filipinos in Estonia.
- Eswatini: There are around 250 Filipinos in Eswatini, mostly working as factory managers or machinery operators in the textile industry.
- Ethiopia: As of 2020, there are around 800 Filipinos in Ethiopia.
- Falkland Islands: There are around 4 Filipinos in the Falkland Islands (a British Overseas Territory).
- Faroe Islands: As of 2017, a total of about 300 Asian women (from the Philippines and Thailand) are living in the Faroe Islands, married to local men (no numbers given of how many women from each of the two Asian countries).
- Federated States of Micronesia: As of 2024, there were approximately 1,500 Filipinos in the Federated States of Micronesia.
- Fiji: As of 2022, there are about 400 to over 1,000 Filipinos live and work in Fiji.
- Finland: As of 2019, there are 5,594 people in Finland born in the Philippines.
- France: As of 2014, there were 44,967 Filipinos in France.
- Gabon: There are approximately 250 Filipinos in Gabon, largely consisting of skilled workers, engineers, and heavy equipment operators.
- The Gambia: As of 2019, there are 32 Filipinos in The Gambia.
- Georgia: As of 2017, there are around 3,500 Filipinos in Georgia.
- Germany: As of 2008, there were 65,000 Filipinos in Germany.
- Ghana: As of 2019, there are 1,990 Filipinos in Ghana.
- Greece: As of 2014, there were 61,681 Filipinos in Greece. See Filipinos in Greece.
- Greenland: As of 2026, there were 1,341 Filipinos in Greenland.
- Guam: As of 2017, there are around 42,317 Filipinos in Guam.
- Guatemala: As of 2017, there are around 254 Filipinos in Guatemala.
- Guyana: As of 2017, there are around 100 Filipinos in Guyana.
- Haiti: As of 2024, there are around 169 registered Filipinos in Haiti, though many have undergone voluntary repatriation due to civil unrest. The community also includes a small number of mixed-race individuals from Filipino-Haitian marriages.
- Honduras: As of 2009, there were 220 Filipinos in Honduras.
- Hungary: As of 2026, there are about 14,000 to 16,000 Filipinos in Hungary, showing a sharp increase from around 800 in 2022.
- Iceland: As of 2012, there were 2,000 Filipinos in Iceland.
- India: As of 2021, there were about 2,000 Filipinos in India.
- Indonesia: As of 2022, there were 7,400 Filipinos in Indonesia.
- Iran: As of 2020, there were 903 Filipinos in Iran.
- Iraq: As of 2020, there were 1,640 Filipinos in Iraq.
- Ireland: As of 2013, there were 13,973 Filipinos in Ireland.
- Israel: As of 2020, there were 29,473 Filipinos in Israel.
- Italy: As of 2015, there were 168,238 documented Filipinos living in Italy. See Filipinos in Italy.
- Ivory Coast: As of 2010, there are some 100 Filipinos in the Ivory Coast.
- Japan: As of 2020, the Philippine government confirmed there were 325,000 Filipinos in Japan. See Filipinos in Japan.
- Jamaica: As of 2024, the Filipino population in Jamaica was estimated at 120.
- Jordan: As of 2020, there were 40,538 Filipinos in Jordan.
- Kazakhstan: As of 2008, there were 7,000 Filipinos in Kazakhstan.
- Kenya: As of 2014, there are some 440 Filipinos in Kenya.
- Kiribati: As of 2017, there are around 20 Filipinos in Kiribati.
- Kosovo: As of 2023, There are around 29 or more registered Filipinos in Kosovo.
- Kuwait: As of 2020, there were 241,999 Filipinos in Kuwait.
- Kyrgyzstan: As of 2021, there were 104 Filipinos in Kyrgyzstan, primarily based in the capital, Bishkek. The community consists of educational nannies for affluent local or expatriate families, medical students, and staff members of international organizations.
- Laos: As of 2013, there were 730 Filipinos in Laos.
- Latvia: As of 2017, there are around 123 Filipinos in Latvia.
- Lebanon: As of 2020, there were 33,424 Filipinos in Lebanon.
- Lesotho: There are around 340 Filipinos in Lesotho according to the Department of Foreign Affairs (DFA). The community primarily consists of technical specialists in diamond mines and garment factories.
- Libya: As of 2020, there were 2,300 Filipinos in Libya.

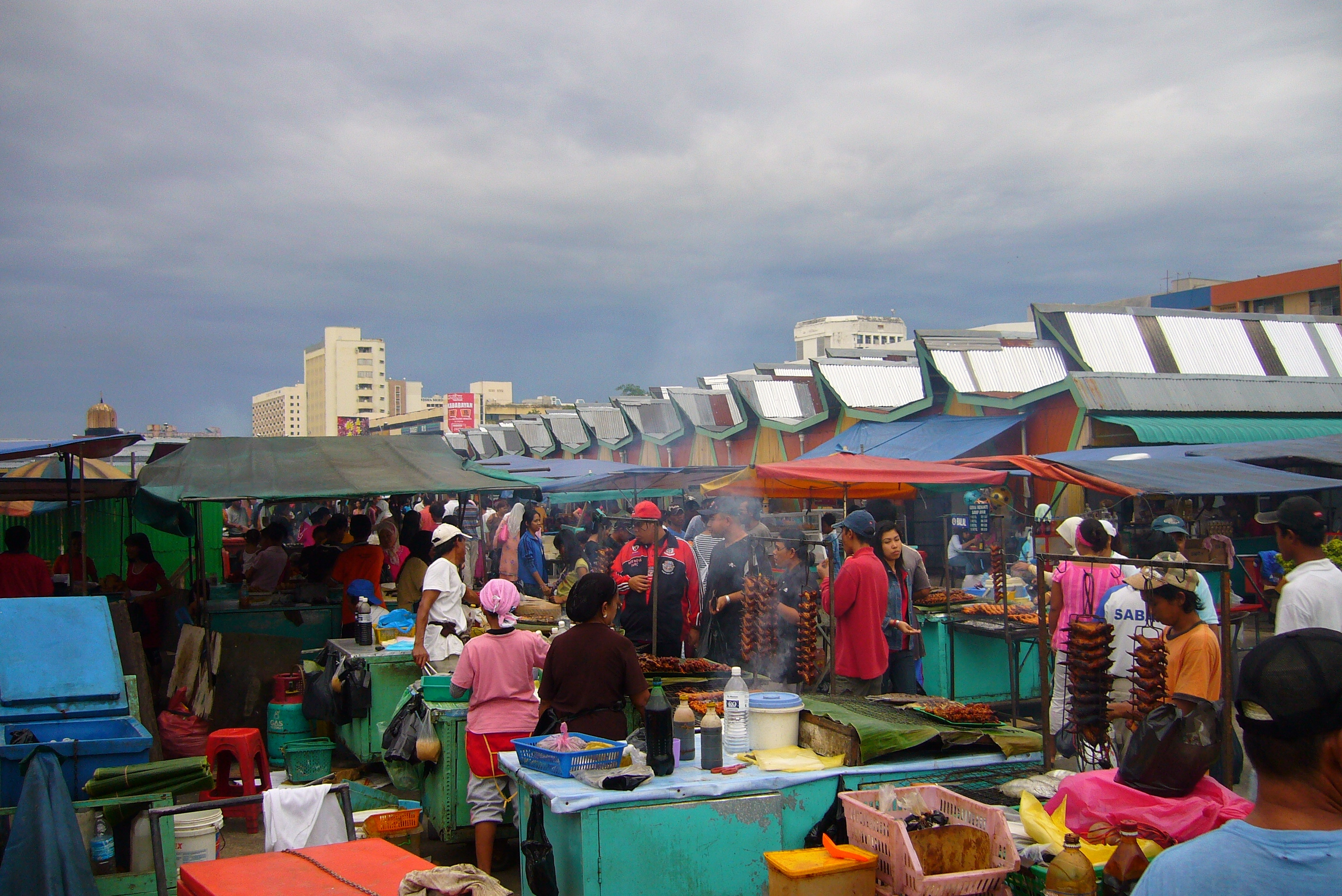
Filipino Market in Kota Kinabalu, Sabah, Malaysia.

- Lithuania: As of 2017, there are around 23 Filipinos in Lithuania.
- Liechtenstein: As of 2024, there were 17 Filipinos in Liechtenstein.
- Luxembourg: As of 2024, there were 929 Filipinos in Luxembourg.
- Marshall Islands: As of 2024, there were around 1,200 Filipinos in the Marshall Islands.
- Madagascar: As of 2025, there were 2 Filipinos in Madagascar.
- Malaysia: As of 2014, there were 620,043 Filipinos in Malaysia. See Filipinos in Malaysia.
- Maldives: As of 2018, there were 3,000 Filipinos in the Maldives.
- Mali: As of 2025, there were 7 Filipinos in Mali.
- Malta: As of 2023, there were 9,560 registered Filipinos in Malta according to Jobsplus data, making them the second-largest non-EU immigrant community in the country.
- Mauritania: There are roughly 35 Filipinos in Mauritania.
- Mauritius: There are around 140 Filipinos in Mauritius, mostly working in the textile, hospitality, and maritime industries.
- Mexico: As of 2010, there are 1,200 Filipinos in Mexico.
- Micronesia: As of 2017, there are around 1,910 Filipinos in Micronesia.
- Moldova: As of 2021, there are around 15 Filipinos in Moldova.
- Monaco: There are around 172 to 177 registered Filipinos in Monaco according to the Philippine Embassy in Paris, maintaining a stable population due to the principality's strict residency regulations.
- Mongolia: As of 2013, there were 441 Filipinos in Mongolia.
- Montenegro: As of 2017, there are around 13 Filipinos in Montenegro.
- Morocco: As of 2014, there were 3,000 Filipinos in Morocco.
- Mozambique: As of 2017, there are around 1,005 Filipinos in Mozambique.
- Myanmar: As of 2025, there are around 800 to 1,500 registered Filipinos in Myanmar, primarily consisting of international school teachers and corporate professionals, though the Department of Migrant Workers (DMW) estimates the total population could reach up to 2,000 when accounting for unregistered individuals and border areas.
- Nauru: As of 2025, there are approximately 378 Filipinos in Nauru.
- Nepal: See Filipinos in Nepal.
- Netherlands: As of 2011, there were 16,719 Filipinos in the Netherlands.
- New Zealand: As of 2023, there were 108,297 Filipinos in New Zealand.
- Nicaragua: There are around 86 Filipinos in Nicaragua.
- Niger: There are around 15 Filipinos in Niger, largely consisting of engineering consultants and aid workers.
- Nigeria: See Filipinos in Nigeria
- Niue: As of 2026, there were 50 registered Filipinos residing in Niue.
- North Cyprus: As of 2017, there are around 3,500 Filipinos in North Cyprus.
- North Korea: As of 2019, there are 4 Filipinos in North Korea.
- North Macedonia: As of 2022, there are around 25 Filipinos in North Macedonia.
- Norway: As of 2013, there were about 18,000 Filipinos in Norway, most of them living in the Oslo urban area. In addition to Filipinos who have intermarried with Norwegians, there are at least 900 licensed Filipino nurses, over a hundred oil engineers employed mostly in offshore projects in the western coast of Norway and Filipinos or Norwegians of Filipino descent working in the government sector, diplomatic missions and NGO's and commercial establishments.
- Oman: As of 2020, there were 52,760 Filipinos in Oman. See Filipinos in Oman.
- Pakistan: See Filipinos in Pakistan.
- Palau: As of 2006, there were 7,000 Filipinos in Palau.
- Palestine: As of 2020, there were 411 Filipinos in Palestine.
- Panama: As of 2017, there are around 89 Filipinos in Panama.
- Papua New Guinea: As of 2013, there are 25,000 Filipinos in Papua New Guinea.
- Paraguay: There are around 61 Filipinos in Paraguay.
- Peru: As of 2017, there are around 118 Filipinos in Peru.
- Poland: As of 2012, there were 525 Filipinos in Poland.
- Portugal: As of 2007, there were 3,200 to 20,000 Filipinos in Portugal.
- Puerto Rico: As of 2014, there were 91,620 Filipinos in Puerto Rico.
- Qatar: As of 2020, there were 241,109 Filipinos in Qatar.
- Republic of the Congo: As of 2017, there are around 168 Filipinos in the Republic of the Congo.
- Romania As of 2021, there are only about 1,500 Filipinos in Romania.
- Russia: As of 2017, the Philippine Embassy in Moscow counted "around 6,000" Filipinos in Russia. The Philippine Overseas Employment Administration (POEA)'s count rose to "close to 10,000" during the 2022 outbreak of the Russo-Ukrainian War. Given a bilateral labor-agreement in the works (as of 2021), that number is likely to increase, the effects of the war prove affect it enough.

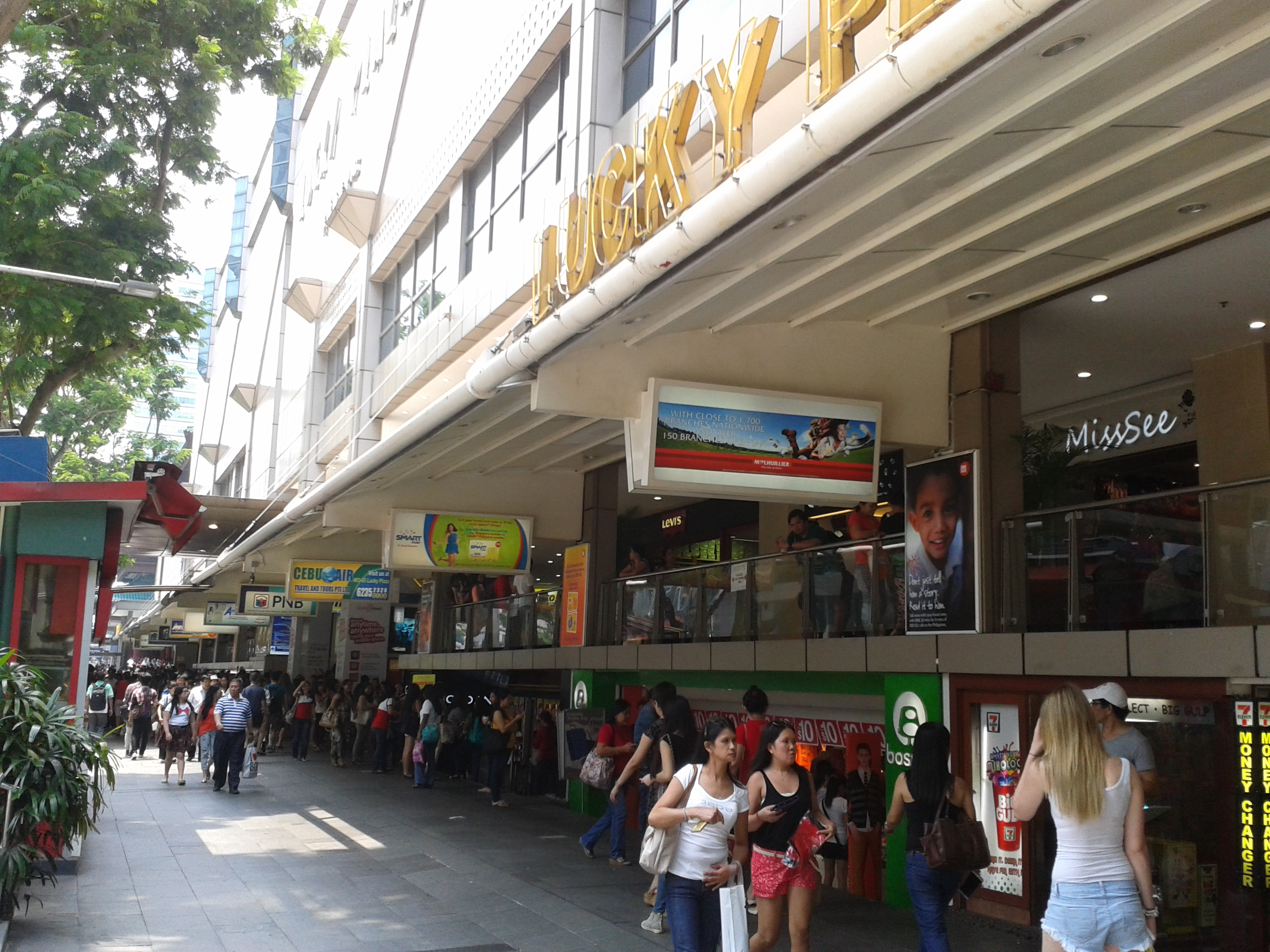
Lucky Plaza mall in Orchard Road hosts products and services that cater for Overseas Filipinos in Singapore.

- Rwanda: There are approximately 60 Filipinos residing in Rwanda.
- Saba: There are around 8 Filipinos in Saba (special municipality of the Netherlands).
- Samoa: As of 2022, there are about 300 Filipinos in Samoa.
- San Marino: As of 2025, there were 9 Filipinos in San Marino.
- Saudi Arabia: As of 2020, there were 865,121 Filipinos in Saudi Arabia.
- São Tomé and Príncipe: As of 2019, there are 147 registered Filipinos in São Tomé and Príncipe according to the Department of Foreign Affairs.
- Senegal: As of 2021, there are roughly 50 Filipinos residing in Senegal, including professionals in international organizations and commercial sectors.
- Serbia: As of 2018, there are 76 Filipinos living in Serbia.
- Seychelles: There are around 450 Filipinos in the Seychelles, predominantly employed in the tourism, hospitality, and tuna processing industries.
- Singapore: As of 2014, there were 200,000 Filipinos in Singapore.
- Sint Eustatius: There are around 8 Filipinos in Sint Eustatius (special municipality of the Netherlands).
- Sint Maarten: As of 2023, the Filipino community in Sint Maarten numbers around 90, primarily employed in luxury hotels and the maritime/yacht service industry.
- Slovakia: As of 2020, there were 551 Filipinos residing in Slovakia.
- Slovenia: As of 2026, around 1,000 Filipinos live and work in Slovenia, primarily concentrated in sectors like transportation, hospitality, healthcare, and customer service. Bilateral labor mobility agreements and growing diplomatic ties between the two nations continue to facilitate legal employment and opportunities for Filipino professionals in the country.
- Solomon Islands: As of 2017, there are around 304 Filipinos in the Solomon Islands.
- Somalia: There are around 12 to 19 Filipinos in Somalia. According to the recent official census of the Philippine Department of Foreign Affairs, 12 Filipinos are explicitly identified and protected under the jurisdiction of the Philippine Embassy in Kenya.
- Somaliland: Statistics for Somaliland are either combined with Somalia or included within Somalia's data. A very small number (around a single digit to 10 individuals) of Filipinos are estimated to reside here, primarily working for international organizations (NGOs) or as technical cooperation personnel.
- South Africa: As of 2008, there are 2,200 Filipinos in South Africa. See Filipinos in South Africa.
- South Korea: As of 2004, there were 41,000 Filipinos in South Korea, whom of 9,000 undocumented Filipinos in South Korea. As of 2014, there were 52,379 Filipinos in South Korea.
- Saint Martin: There are around 201 Filipinos in Saint Martin.
- Spain: There are about 200,000 Filipino nationals in Spain. In addition, thousands more hold dual citizenship. Being a former colony of Spain, Filipino citizens can apply for dual citizenship within two years residence.
- Sri Lanka: As of 2022, there were more than 700 Filipinos in Sri Lanka.
- Sudan: As of 2023, there are around 400 Filipinos in Sudan.
- Suriname: As of 2023, there are around 15 Filipinos in Suriname, mostly contract workers in the logging, mining, and fishing industries.
- Svalbard (Norway): As of 2024, there were over 200 Filipinos living in Longyearbyen, making them one of the largest immigrant communities in the high Arctic.
- Sweden: As of 2018, there were 24,456 Filipinos in Sweden.
- Switzerland: As of 2007, there were around 10,000 Filipinos in Switzerland.
- Syria: As of 2012, there are over 5,000 Filipinos in Syria.
- Taiwan: As of 2021, there were 147,000 Filipinos in Taiwan.
- Tajikistan: As of 2010, there were 25 Filipinos in Tajikistan.
- Thailand: As of 2024, there were 32,950 Filipinos in Thailand.
- Timor-Leste: As of 2017, there are around 1,220 Filipinos in Timor-Leste.
- Togo: As of 2019, there are 24 Filipinos in Togo.
- Tonga: As of 2022, there were 87 Filipinos in Tonga.
- Tunisia: There are roughly 60 Filipinos in Tunisia, consisting of professionals and those married to local nationals.
- Turkey: As of 2008, there were 5,500 Filipinos in Turkey.
- Trinidad and Tobago: There are around 3,000 Filipinos in Trinidad and Tobago.
- Turks and Caicos Islands: There are around 2,148 Filipinos residing in the Turks and Caicos Islands.
- Turkmenistan: As of 2021, there were 26 Filipinos in Turkmenistan. Most are contracted engineering and technical personnel working at gas plants or oil drilling sites under strict visa controls.
- Tuvalu: As of 2026, there is only 1 Filipino resident in Tuvalu (a Catholic missionary priest), managed under the jurisdiction of the Embassy in Canberra.
- Uganda: As of 2012, there were about 600 Filipinos in Uganda.
- Ukraine: As of 2019, there were 342 Filipinos in Ukraine.
- United Arab Emirates: As of 2020, there were 648,929 Filipinos in the United Arab Emirates.
- United Kingdom: As of 2014, there were 200,000 Filipinos in the United Kingdom. Nurses and caregivers have begun migrating to the United Kingdom in recent years. The island nation has welcomed thousands of nurses and various other occupations from the Philippines during the past 5 years. Many Filipino seamen settled in British port cities during the late 19th and early 20th centuries. Liverpool even had an area nicknamed 'Little Manila'. See Filipinos in the United Kingdom.
- United States: As of 2010, there were 3.4 million Filipinos in the United States, including those of partial descent. Despite race relation problems of the late 19th and early 20th centuries in the American Northwest, most Filipino Americans today find it easy to integrate into American society. Filipinos are the second-largest Asian American group in the country. The United States hosts the largest population of Filipinos outside the Philippines, with a Historic Filipinotown in Los Angeles designated in August 2002, the first district established outside the Philippines to honor and recognize the area's Filipino community. The largest population of Filipino Americans reside in California; there are other large populations in the New York metropolitan area, Illinois, Nevada, Texas, and Hawaii.
- Uruguay: There are around 14 Filipinos in Uruguay.
- Uzbekistan: As of 2017, there are around 3,809 Filipinos in Uzbekistan.
- Vanuatu: As of 2026, there are several dozen Filipinos in Vanuatu, primarily working as technical specialists and service staff.
- Venezuela: As of 2013, there were about 200 Filipinos living in Venezuela.
- Vietnam: As of 2016, there were nearly 20,000 Filipinos in Vietnam.
  - Hai Phong: There were majority Filipinos of Filmann Simpao, Agnes Javines, Dannla Jean, Rodjean Balinan Angit/Jean Daulog, Katerada (formerly Joy Guloman), Lilibeth Segampong, Rjay Totskie Cedullo, Joana D. Rampas, 매안 (formerly Mhe Vasquez) in Hai Phong.
- Yemen: As of 2020, there were 150 Filipinos in Yemen.
- Zambia: As of 2016, there were approximately 475 Filipinos in Zambia.
- Zimbabwe: As of 2019, there were 27 Filipinos in Zimbabwe.

== See also ==
- Immigration
- Balikbayan box
- Filipinos in the New York metropolitan area
- Human migration
- Overseas Filipino Worker
- Philippine Independence Day Parade
