= Filipinos in Uganda =

Pilipino sa Uganda (Tagalog)

Total population
- 600 (2012)

Regions with significant populations
- Kampala, Entebbe

Languages
- Tagalog, English, Swahili and other Languages of Uganda

Religion
- Christianity (mainly Roman Catholicism)

Related ethnic groups
- Overseas Filipino

In 2012, there were about six hundred Filipinos in Uganda. The leader of the community was Divina Mikkelsen and they were represented diplomatically by the consul in neighbouring Kenya, Donna Celeste Feliciano Gatmaytan.

== See also ==
- Foreign relations of the Philippines
