= Filipinos in Pakistan =

Total population
- Approx. 3,000

Regions with significant populations
- Islamabad, Karachi, Lahore and Peshawar.

Languages
- English (Philippine and Pakistani), Philippine languages (Filipino-Tagalog), Pakistani languages (Urdu)

Religion
- Mostly Roman Catholicism, minority of Protestantism and Islam.

Related ethnic groups
- Overseas Filipino

Filipinos in Pakistan (Urdu: فَلپائنی) consist of migrants from the Philippines. In 2008, there were an estimated 1,500 Filipinos in Pakistan according to the statistics of the Philippine government. Many Filipinos came to Pakistan for work and those who later married Pakistanis now hold Pakistani citizenship.

== Migration history ==
Many Filipino people entered Pakistan's commercial center Karachi illegally with fake passports and false identity cards as early in 1990s along with hundreds of Nepali, Bengals, Sri Lankans and Indians however later deported. As of April 2010, there are 546 registered Filipino living in Pakistan who were eligible to vote in 2010 Philippine presidential election as per Philippines Foreign Affairs ministry.

== Employment ==
Many Filipinos in Pakistan are domestic workers, including the housemaids of high government officials and rich Pakistanis. There are some three Filipino maids at house of former Pakistani Prime Minister Yousaf Raza Gillani and many Filipinos working as chefs in Japanese restaurants in Karachi and Islamabad. A small number of Filipinos studying Islam in the country is reported by the Philippines Embassy in Islamabad while thousands of Muslim students from various Southeast Asian countries including Philippines illegally studying in the Pakistani Madrasahs.

== Relations with Pakistani society ==
In 2007, following a state of emergency declared by Pakistani President Pervez Musharraf, about 200 Filipinos gathered in Islamabad on the advice of Ambassador Jimmy Yambao to call for protest. However, there have no direct threats to safety of Filipinos in Pakistan reported.

As of April 2023, the DFA reported that approximately 3,000 Filipinos live and work in Pakistan, many of whom are active in cultural and civic events. A Filipino community event was held in June 2024 in Lahore to mark the 126th Philippine Independence Day.

== See also ==
- Pakistan–Philippines relations
