= Embassy of the Philippines, Pretoria =

Diplomatic mission of the Philippines in South Africa

Embassy of the Philippines, Pretoria Pasuguan ng Pilipinas sa Pretoria

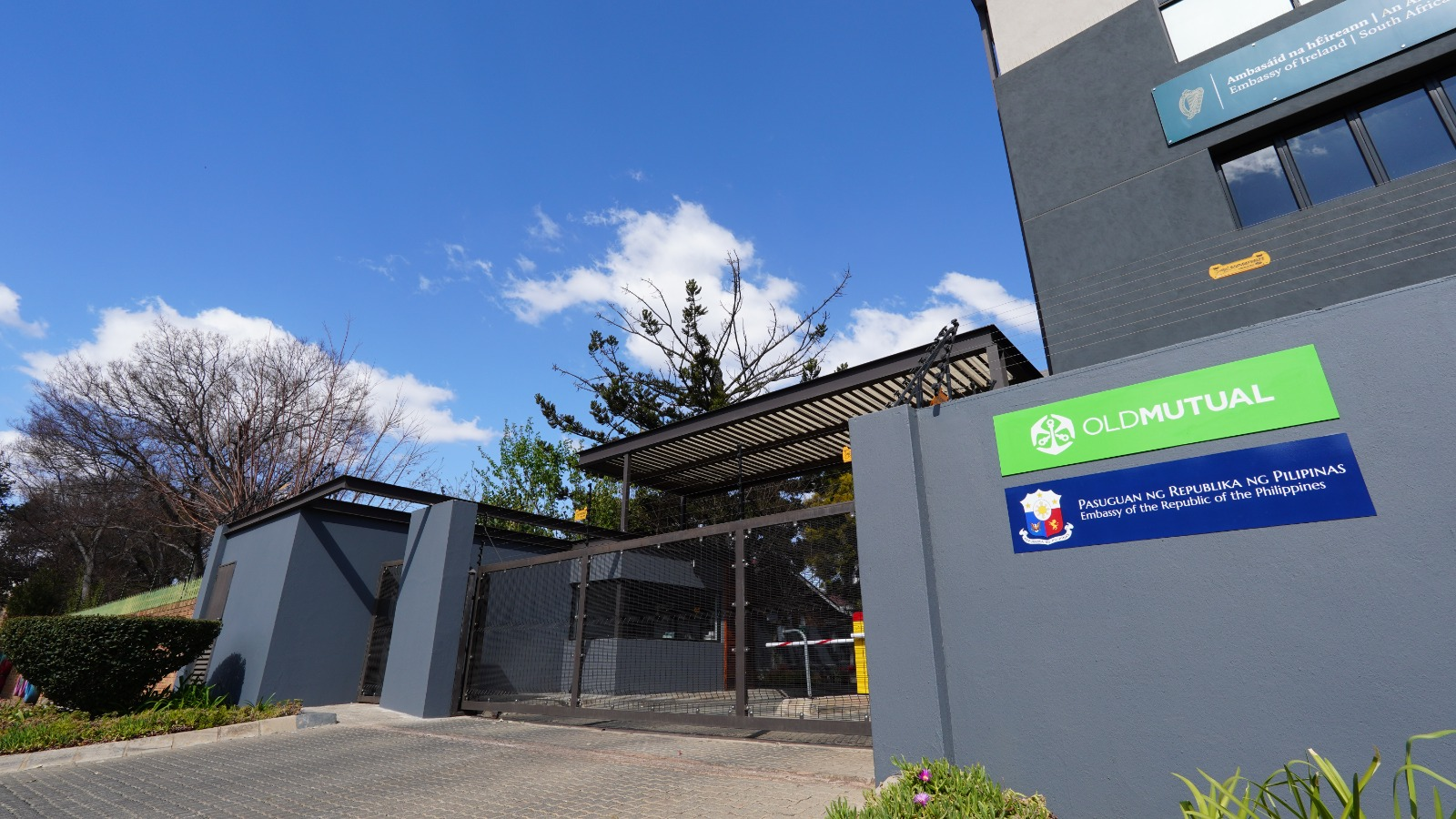
- Location: Pretoria
- Address: 238 Florence Ribeiro Avenue, Nieuw Muckleneuk
- Coordinates: 25°46′20.7″S 28°13′27.5″E
- Ambassador: Myla Grace Ragenia C. Macahilig
- Website: pretoriape.dfa.gov.ph

The Embassy of the Philippines in Pretoria is the diplomatic mission of the Republic of the Philippines to the Republic of South Africa. Opened in 1994, it is located at OMK House in the Nieuw Muckleneuk suburb of southeastern Pretoria.

== History ==
Diplomatic relations between the Philippines and South Africa were established in November 1993, during the presidency of Fidel V. Ramos, with a resident mission in the country being established in April 1994. Leonides T. Caday, at the time serving at the Philippine Embassy in Manama as the country's first ambassador to Bahrain, arrived in Pretoria two months later to serve as the Philippines' first ambassador to South Africa, presenting his credentials to the newly elected President Nelson Mandela on June 24, 1994.

The embassy's jurisdiction has expanded and shrunk over time. In 1996, with the appointment of Eloy R. Bello III as ambassador, the embassy's jurisdiction was widened to include Zambia, Namibia and Swaziland. Three years later with the appointment of Aladin G. Villacorte as ambassador, it was further expanded to include Mauritius, Botswana, Mozambique, Lesotho and Angola, with Zimbabwe being added later on, although Mauritius was subsequently transferred to the Philippine Embassy in Nairobi until 2015, when both it and Madagascar were placed under the Pretoria mission's jurisdiction. Angola was then transferred to the jurisdiction of the Philippine Embassy in Lisbon that same year.

== Chancery ==
The chancery of the Philippine Embassy in Pretoria was initially located in a room of the Courtyard Hotel in Arcadia before relocating to the Southern Life Plaza Building in neighboring Hatfield two months later. On September 1, 2000, it relocated to 54 Nicolson Street in Muckleneuk.

On August 30, 2024, the embassy announced that it was relocating to Nieuw Muckleneuk, having expressed a desire to move the chancery to a more suitable building and location for conducting its activities. Operations at the chancery on Nicolson Street ended on August 25, 2024, and it officially relocated to the new chancery a week later on September 3, 2024. with its first clients being welcomed the following day.

In the 2017–2022 Philippine Development Plan, the Philippine government identified as a priority project the acquisition of a property in Pretoria to serve as a permanent chancery, budgeting over ₱320 million for this purpose and assigning the DFA to serve as the implementing agency.

== Staff and activities ==
The Philippine Embassy in Pretoria is headed by Ambassador Myla Grace Ragenia C. Macahilig, who was appointed to the position by President Bongbong Marcos on September 19, 2025. Prior to her appointment as ambassador, Macahilig, a career diplomat, was deployed to the Philippine Embassy to the Holy See where she served as ambassador in her first ambassadorial posting. Her appointment was confirmed by the Commission on Appointments on October 7, 2025, and she presented her credentials to South African President Cyril Ramaphosa on April 8, 2026.

Many of the embassy's activities are focused on growing social, cultural and economic ties between the Philippines and South Africa, as well as ensuring the welfare of the some 4,000 Filipinos resident in the country. Among these include organizing and facilitating Philippine trade missions to South Africa, exhibiting Philippine culinary and cultural products, and facilitating the exit of Filipinos stranded in countries within its jurisdiction during the COVID-19 pandemic. It also holds regular consular missions and town halls in the various countries under its jurisdiction, as well as in cities within South Africa itself.

In 2008, the Cape Argus published an article claiming that horse fighting was a popular pastime in the Philippines, drawing on a first-hand account from one of their journalists detailing such an activity taking place in Don Carlos, Bukidnon. Embassy officials later reported receiving many letters criticizing the country for the practice, which they responded to by writing a letter to the editor of the Argus claiming that while the practice is traditional to only a few isolated ethnic groups in Mindanao, it is nevertheless illegal and prohibited by law, that the Philippine government has been largely successful in curbing it, and that the government does not condone cruelty to animals.

== See also ==
- Filipinos in South Africa
- List of diplomatic missions in South Africa
- List of diplomatic missions of the Philippines
- Philippines–South Africa relations
