= Filipino seamen =

Seafarers from the Philippines

Filipino seamen, also referred to as Filipino seafarers or Filipino sailors, are seamen, sailors, or seafarers from the Philippines. Although, in general, the term "Filipino seamen" may include personnel from the Philippine Navy or the Philippine Marine Corps, it specifically refers to overseas Filipinos who are "sea-based migrant Filipino workers".

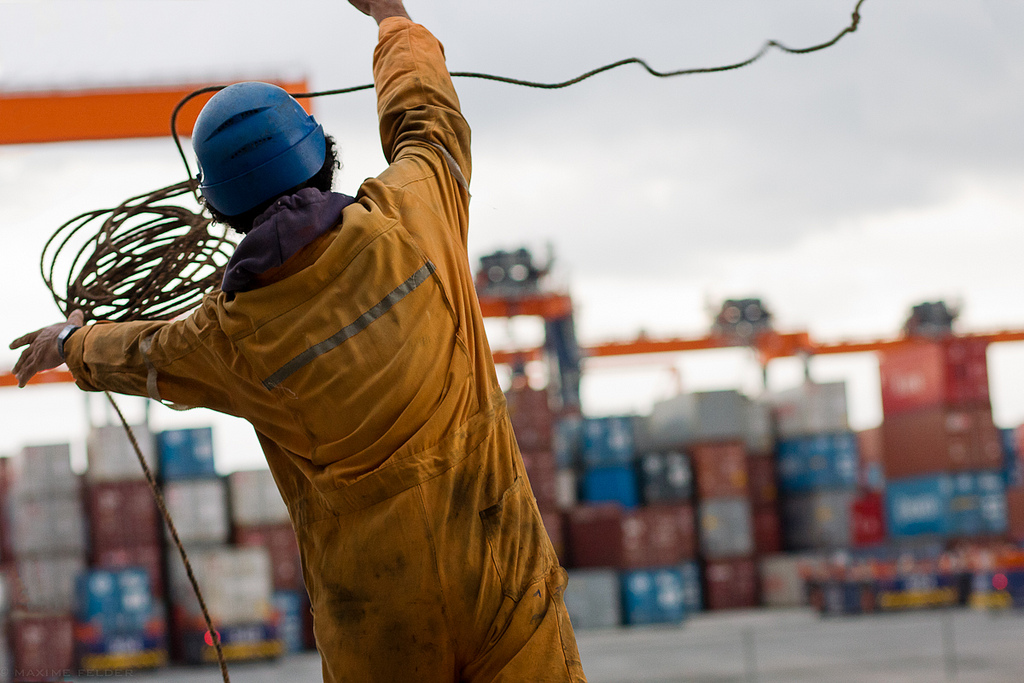
Filipino seaman throwing heaving line with monkey fist.

== Training and qualification ==
Aspiring Filipino seamen are required to acquire degrees such as Bachelor of Science in Marine Transportation and Bachelor of Science in Marine Engineering or basic seaman course from maritime schools. According to Miguel Angel Rocha, the EVP/COO of CF Sharp Crew Management, Inc., one of the leading manning companies in the Philippines, there are around 80 to 100 maritime schools in the Philippines who offer these degrees. The courses had a three-year curriculum composed of classroom instruction and 12 months of on-board training. After the course, the candidates have to take the seaman's state board exam.

In order to become a registered seaman in the Philippines, an applicant should have a valid Seafarer's Identification and Record Book (SIRB) from the Maritime Industry Authority (MARINA), a document that proves that the applicant passed the minimum standard requirements as a licensed mariner for the seamanship profession and trade. The required seaman training certification is known as the Standards of Training Certification and Watchkeeping (STCW), and is in accordance with the rules and regulations of the International Maritime Organization (IMO). Professional registration for Marine Deck Officers and Engineers was previously done through the licensure examination conducted by the Professional Regulation Commission. But starting 2014, as per Philippines Republic Act 10635, an act establishing Maritime Industry Authority as a single maritime andministration of the Philippines, professional registrations and licensure examinations are done by the Board of Marine Deck and Engine Officers of the Maritime Industry Authority (MARINA.)

== Statistics ==
There are around 280,000 students who graduate from maritime schools every year. In 1996, it was estimated that there were more than 250,000 Filipino seafarers; in 2013, that number has been estimated to have increased to about 460,000. Filipinos employed as seamen worldwide, more than any other nationality. The Philippines is one of the primary source of seamen in the global shipping and transport market. Filipino seamen are often recruited to man tankers and sea vessels from countries, including those from North America, South America, Europe and Asia, such as Denmark, Japan, the United States, Panama, Liberia, Cyprus, Bahamas, Jamaica, Greece, Malta, Singapore, Norway and Germany.

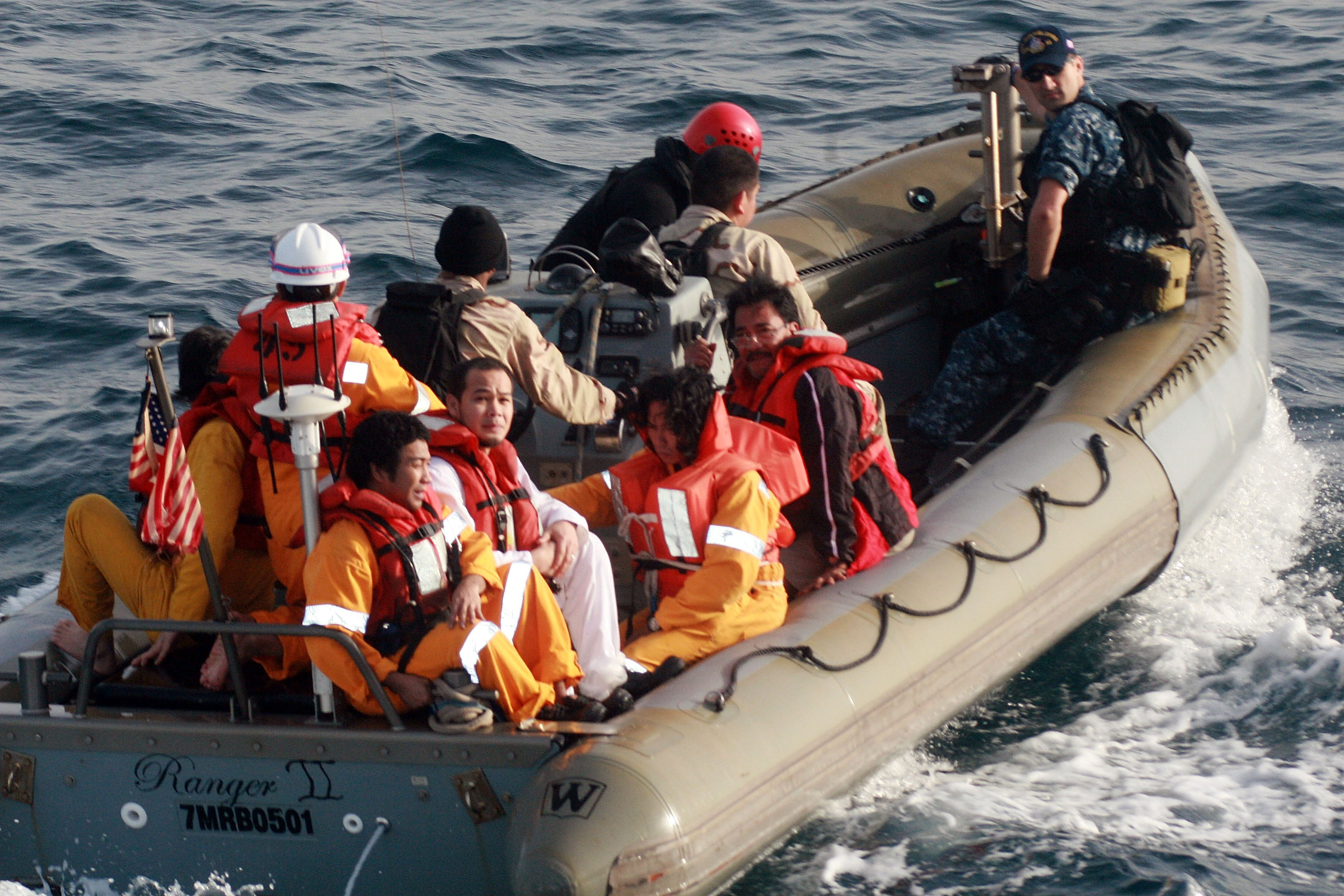
USS John Paul Jones (DDG 53) Transfer Six Rescued Filipino Mariners to the Cutter USCGC Baranof

According to the Philippine Overseas Employment Administration (POEA), the Philippines is the world's main supplier of seamen since 1987, making the Philippines the manning capital of the world. According to the Department of Labor and Employment of the Philippines, around 229,000 Filipino seamen were on board merchant shipping vessels around the world at any given time, The figure showed that Filipino seamen comprised more than 25 percent of 1.5 million mariners worldwide, the "single biggest nationality bloc" in the shipping industry. In 2007, according to the POEA, there were 1,157 seamen (869 in 2006) from the Philippines who had been employed by registered or accredited manning agencies.

In 2007, the figure of Filipino seamen overseas was 226,900. Included in the total – according to job function – 31,818 were designated or ranked as seamen; 19,491 as oilers; 17,355 as ordinary seamen; 7,810 as mess men; 7,778 as chief cooks; 7,737 as bosuns; 7,056 as third engineers; 6,599 third mates; and 6,388 as waiters. Based on the type of ship, 47,782 Filipino seamen were on board passenger-type vessels; 42,356 were on bulk carriers; 31,983 were on container ships; 25,011 were on tankers; 14, 462 were on oil or product tankers; 10,754 were on general cargo ships; 7,502 were on chemical tankers; 6,610 were on tugboats; 5,742 were on pure car carriers; and 3,471 were on gas tankers.

=== On board Japanese ships ===
In 2009, during the 28th joint meeting of the Japan-Philippines Economic Cooperation Committee senior adviser of Komatsu Ltd. Toshitaka Hagiwara declared that 70% of Japanese maritime operations were manned by Filipinos seamen. According to president and chief executive officer of Magsaysay Maritime Corporation Doris Magsaysay-Ho, there were more than 28,000 Filipino crewmembers on board Japanese ships. Although classified as "non-domiciled special members", Filipino seamen comprised 55% of the membership of the All Japan Seaman's Union.

=== On board United States ships ===
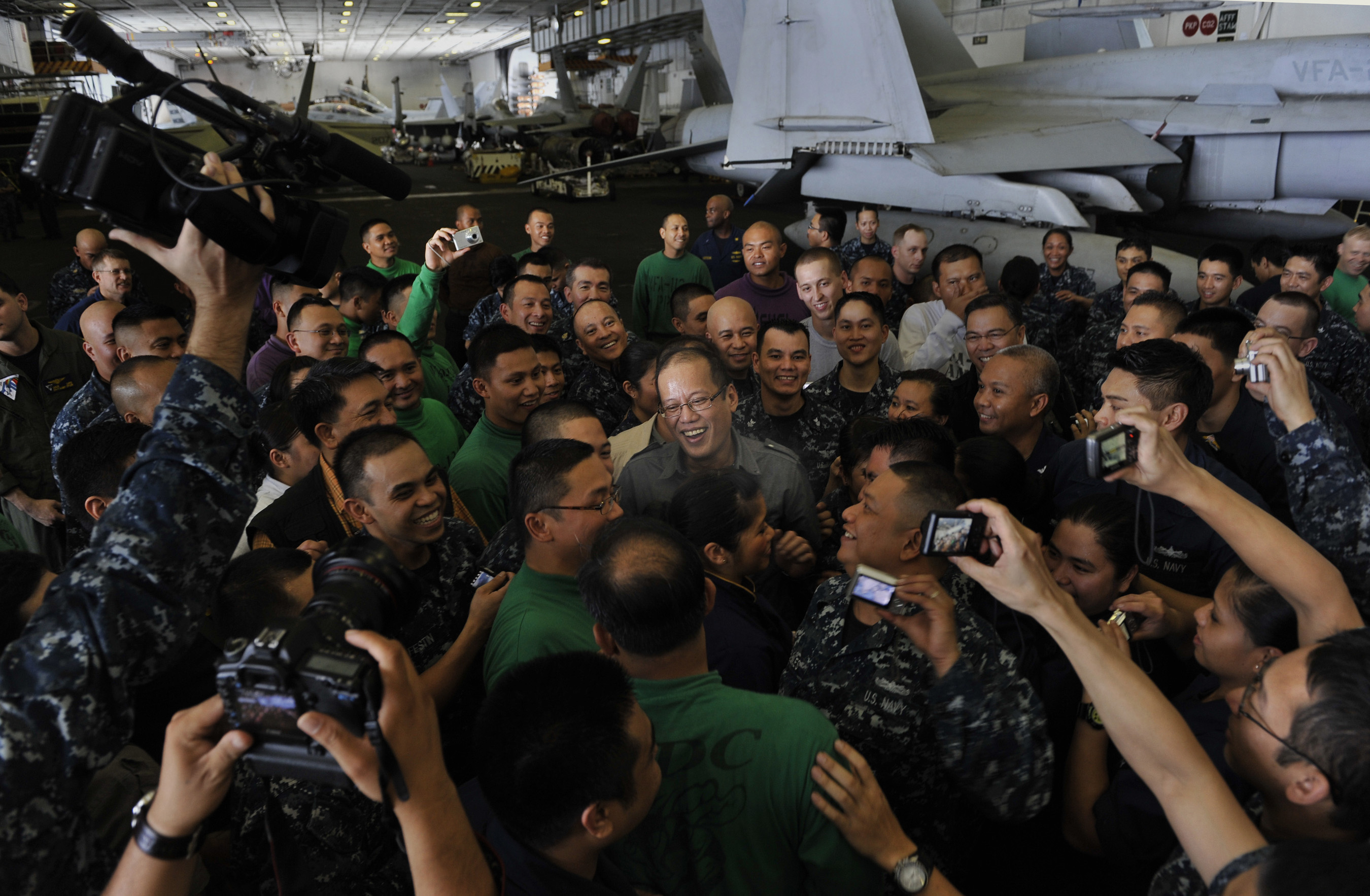
Filipino sailors of the US Navy met by Philippine President Benigno Aquino III in the hangar bay aboard the USS Carl Vinson (CVN-70) on 14 May 2011.

In the 1930s, until the passage of the Merchant Marine Act of 1936, there were 8,000 Filipinos in the United States Merchant Marine; until the Philippine Independence Act, Filipinos were U.S. nationals.

In August 2007, according to Captain Rudy Lupton, commanding officer of the USS Blue Ridge (LCC-19) (the command ship in the Pacific of the 7th fleet of the United States) around 120 (one-sixth) of the 650 seamen of the USS Blue Ridge were Filipino.

=== On board FOC ships ===
A substantial number of Filipino seamen worldwide were often employed by Flag of Convenience (FOC) ships or "sweatships", meaning ships that were registered in a country (flag of registry, or FOR) other than the country of ownership where registration fees were cheap, taxes are low or non-existent, and there were lax restrictions on the employment of cheap labor. According to the ITF, there were about 20,906 FOC ships in 2003, including ships from Panama, Liberia, Cyprus, Malta, and the Bahamas. A third of Panamian-flagged ships were crewed by Filipino seamen, 12.8% of Liberian-flagged ships were crewed by Filipino seamen, 11% of Cypriot-flagged ships were crewed by Filipino seamen, 8.2% of Malta-flagged ships were crewed by Filipino seamen, 7.9% of Bahamas-flagged ships were crewed by Filipino seamen. Below is a table comparing figures of Filipino seamen on board FOC ships in 2002 and in 2007, in order to show the statistical trend:

Table 1: Deployment/assignment of Filipino seamen
Flag/Country of registration	Number of Filipino seamen on board in 2007	Number of Filipino seamen on board in 2002
Panama	51,614	50,651
Bahamas	29,681	26,164
Liberia	21,966	18,653
Singapore	10,308	6,492
Marshall Islands	9,772	no data available
United Kingdom	8,172	6,382
Malta	7,513	8,614
Cyprus	7,052	9,324
Netherlands	7,017	no data available
Norway	6,975	11,682
Greece	no data available	5,699
Japan	no data available	4,698

=== Maritime incidents and casualties ===
The shipping industry and seaman profession were not without incident or peril. There were maritime disasters that resulted in the loss of life of and injury to Filipino seamen. The following is a table showing some events in recent years that caused harm or death to seamen from the Philippines while on assignment abroad:

Table 2: Maritime incidents and Filipino seamen casualties
Date	Maritime case/incident	Location of case/incident	Name(s) of ship(s)	Type of ship	Flag of ship	Number of Filipino seamen affected	Description of casualties
20 November 1994	Ship caught fire	Off coast Norfolk, Virginia	Polydoros	Cargo ship	no information	1	Death
January 1995	Collision of ships while approaching port	Constanta, Romania	Paris and You Xin	no information	Malta and Hong Kong	23	Declared missing
February 1995	Ship leaked while transporting lumber	Sailing towards Korea while in waters of Japan	Sun River II	Cargo ship	Panama	10	Drowned in freezing waters
21 August 1995	Explosion on ship due to bursting oxygen and acetylene tanks	no information	African Evergreen	Cargo ship	Liberia	7	3 deaths, 4 injuries
20 June 1986	Collision of ships	no information	Polydefkis and Anna Spiratou	no information	Cyprus and Greece	24	Declared missing
16 January 1998	Sinking of ship	Off the Newfoundland coast	The Flare	Bulk carrier	Cyprus	16	Death
22 July 1998	Sinking of ship	Off Kharg Island, Iran	Borvigilant	Tugboat	United Arab Emirates	9	6 deaths, 3 survivors
December 1998	Disappearance of ship	Taiwan Strait	Pixy Mario	Cargo ship	Panama	19	Declared missing
25 August 1999	Ship explosion	Mid-Atlantic	Karteria	Bulk carrier	Malta	3	2 deaths, 1 survivor with broken back and burns
2 November 1999	Capsizing of ship in calm seas	no information	Mighty Servant 2	Heavy load carrier	Netherlands Antilles	2	Death
24 March 2009	Sinking of ship	no information	Leader L	Bulk carrier	Panama	13	Death
1 November 2009	Sinking of ship	Off the coast of Taiwan	Manila Spirit	Bulk carrier	Panama	12	Death
8 November 2009	Sinking of ship during a storm	Near Dansol, Pangasinan, Philippines	Ho Feng 8	Cargo ship	Panama	3	Survived after drifting at sea for 3 days
25 July 2002	Ship ran aground during a storm	Off the southwest coast of Japan	Co-op Venture	Bulk carrier	Panama	3	Drowned
9 December 2002	Explosion in ship due to high-pressure air leak	Off the coast of Newcastle, New South Wales	The Golden Bridge	Bulk carrier	Panama	1	Death after sustaining head injuries
21 February 2003	Capsizing of ship in rough seas	Off a remote island in Japan	Pendora	Cargo ship	Panama	16	4 presumed dead, 12 survivors rescued
24 January 2004	Ship explosion due to mismanagement	Off Virginia coast	Bow Mariner	Chemical Tanker	Singapore	24	18 presumed dead, 6 survivors rescued

== Salary ==
The salary of Filipino seamen varies according to their position and is dependent on the employer or the hiring company. In the 1980s, the minimum pay set by the International Transport Workers' Federation for able-bodied (AB) seamen was around US$1300 monthly, including fringe benefits, holiday pay, and overtime pay. Based on the bill by TUCP secretary general and former Philippine Senator Ernesto Herrera, the lowest pay for a Filipino seaman aboard foreign ships was US$1000 monthly, which was based on the minimum pay of US$850 monthly set by the International Labour Organization as the monthly base pay for an ordinary seaman who is the lowest ranking crew member of a ship.

According to Manolo I. Abella's Export of Filipino Manpower, the statistics from the Professional Regulation Commission (PRC) of the Philippines indicated that there were 18,293 Filipino marine engineers and 15,965 deck officers registered with the PRC in 1976. The registry of the National Seamen's Board (NSB) had 82,373 registrants during the beginning of July 1977. From the 82,373, 20.9% (17,255) were registered as qualified ship officers, the rest were registered as qualified crewmen.

== Contribution to Philippine economy ==
Filipino seamen are a major segment of overseas Filipino workers who contributed to the Philippine economy. Filipino seamen have been a major source of US dollar remittances to the Philippines. In 2008, according to Doris Magsaysay-Ho, 28,000 Filipino seamen remitted US$3 billion to the Philippines from Japan alone. According to the Trade Union Congress of the Philippines (TUCP), the total of financial remittances sent to the Philippines by overseas Filipino seamen was US$2.501 billion during the first nine months of 2009 (US$2.393 billion in 2008).

== Contribution to world trade ==
In 2010, according to the Business Monitor, Efthimios E. Mitropoulos, the secretary-general of the International Maritime Organization (IMO) described Filipino seamen as sailors who were "unsung heroes" of an "unsung industry", namely the shipping industry that carried "most of the world trade in goods". Mitropoulos further stated that the "international community should pay tribute to the Filipino seafarers" and to the Philippines for their contributions to the shipping and international seaborne trade. On a similar note, former United Nations secretary-general Ban Ki-moon hoped that many Filipino youth would join the seamen's profession.

== See also ==
- Board examination
- Board certification
- Overseas Filipino Worker
