= Foreign communities in Algeria =

This table showing the various foreign communities in Algeria :

Country	Number of community	Most important areas	Main business	Notes
Spain	-	wilaya : Oran	Building construction	
Italy	2,000	wilayas : Annaba، Algiers، Constantine، Oran	-	
Bangladesh	-	-	-	
United Kingdom	250	-	-	
Belgium	-	-	Building construction, public works, irrigation	
Belarus	400	-	-	
Turkey	2,900	-	-	
Chad	-	wilayas : Tamanrasset، Wargla، Ghardaia، Bechar	-	
Tunisia	15,898	In the east	-	التونسيون في الخارج
Russia	400	-	-	
Senegal	-	wilayas : Tamanrasset، Wargla، Ghardaia، Bechar	-	
Syria	10,000	-	-	
Sierra Leone	-	wilayas : Tamanrasset، Wargla، Ghardaia، Bechar	-	
Western Sahara	90,000	wilaya Tindouf	-	
China	35,000	-	Construction and trade	
Iraq	20,000	-	-	
Ghana	-	wilayas : Tamanrasset، Wargla، Ghardaia، Bechar	-	
Guinea	-	wilayas : Tamanrasset، Wargla، Ghardaia، Bechar	-	
France	11,000	In major cities	-	
Philippines	9,243	-	-	
West Bank	11,500	-	Education	
Cameroon	600	wilayas : Tamanrasset، Wargla، Ghardaia، Bechar	-	
Ivory Coast	-	wilayas : Tamanrasset، Wargla، Ghardaia، Bechar	-	
South Korea	1,158	wilayas : Oran، Algiers، Skikda، Médéa	-	الكوريون في العالم العربي
Lebanon	500	-	-	
Mali	1,500	wilayas : Tamanrasset، Wargla، Ghardaia، Bechar	-	
Egypt	15,000	wilayas : Algiers، Oran	-	
Morocco	-	In the west	-	
Niger	-	wilayas : Tamanrasset، Wargla، Ghardaia، Bechar	-	
India	2,500	-	-	
Japan	816	-	-	العلاقات الجزائرية اليابانية
All countries	242,000	-	-	
