= Japan–Philippines Economic Partnership Agreement =

Bilateral diplomatic relations

Japan-Philippines Economic Partnership Agreement
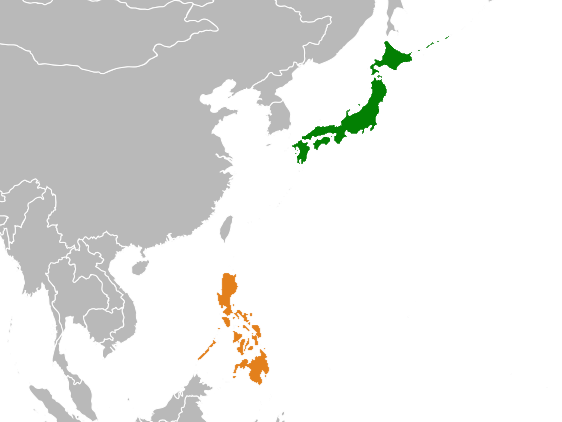
- Type: Trade agreement
- Signed: 9 September 2006; 19 years ago
- Parties: Japan; Philippines

The Japan-Philippines Economic Partnership Agreement (日本・フィリピン経済連携協定) or in (Filipino: Kasunduang Pangkabuhayan ng Hapon at Pilipinas) or commonly known as JPEPA is an economic partnership agreement concerning bilateral investment and free trade agreement between Japan and the Philippines. It was signed in Helsinki, Finland on September 9, 2006, by Japanese Prime Minister Junichiro Koizumi and Philippine President Gloria Macapagal Arroyo. It is the first bilateral trade treaty which the Philippines has entered since the Parity Right Agreement of 1946 with the United States. This treaty consists of 16 Chapters and 165 Articles, with 8 Annexes.

== Aims & goal ==
Chapter 1 (General Provisions), Article 1 (Objectives) of the JPEPA, the agreement has the following objective.

- Create effective procedures for the implementation and operation of this Agreement and for the resolution of disputes.
- Promote transparency in the implementation of laws and regulations respecting matters covered by this agreement.
- Establish a framework for further bilateral cooperation and improvement of business environment.
- Promote competition by addressing anti-competitive activities and cooperate in the field of competition.
- Enhance protection of intellectual property and strengthen cooperation in the field thereof to promote trade and investment between Japan and the Philippines.
- Promote transparency in government procurement.
- Increase investment opportunities and strengthen protection for investments and investment activities in Japan and the Philippines.
- Facilitate the mutual recognition of the results of conformity assessment procedures for products or processes.
- To liberalize and facilitate trade in goods and services between Japan and the Philippines.

== Controversy ==
Environmentalists cry foul over this provision, stating that various laws are bound to be violated if the agreement pushes through. Under the Constitution alone, it is imperative that the State promotes the people's right to health (Article II, Section 15), and right to a balanced and healthful ecology (Article II, Section 16). Other laws that may be violated include Republic Act No. 6969 (Toxic Substance and Hazardous and Nuclear Waste Act of 1990) which prohibits the entry of hazardous wastes into and their disposal within the country for whatever purpose, and Republic Act No. 4653 (An Act to Safeguard the Health of the People and Maintain the Dignity of the Nation by Declaring it a National Policy to Prohibit the Commercial Importation of Textile Articles Commonly Known as Used Clothing and Rags) wherein worn clothing and other worn articles, used or new rags, scrap twine, cordage, rope and cables and worn out articles of twine, cordage, rope or cables, of textile materials are also prohibited from being imported into the Philippines. Aside from local laws, one international treaty is also said to be a direct contradiction to the JPEPA. The Basel Convention on the Control of Transboundary Movements of Hazardous Wastes and their Disposal was ratified in 1989 by 133 countries and is currently adopted by 170 countries, including Japan and the Philippines. It is the most comprehensive global environmental treaty on hazardous and other wastes, addressing cleaner production, hazardous waste minimization and controls on the movement of these wastes. One of the main concerns regarding JPEPA is the possibility of having Japan export their waste products and hazardous materials to the Philippines. Such products are included in Article 29 of the agreement, which defines "originating goods. Under Article 18 of the agreement, both Japan and the Philippines shall either "reduce or eliminate its customs duties eliminate other duties or charges of any kind imposed on or in connection with the importation and take part in "improving market access conditions for originating goods.

== Ratification ==
This treaty was ratified by Senate of the Philippines on 2008, after two side agreements had been signed where Japan agreed to not send any toxic waste to the Philippines and to avoid violating the Philippine Constitution.

== Constitutionality ==
In January, 2024, the Supreme Court of the Philippines in a 95-page En Banc Judgment (G.R. Nos. 184635 and 185366 'IDEALS, Inc. v. Senate') penned by Senior Associate Justice Marvic Leonen, upheld the constitutionality of the Japan-Philippines Economic Partnership Agreementof dismissing the consolidated petitions for certiorari and prohibition of petitioners Initiatives for Dialogue and Empowerment through Alternative Legal Services, Inc., (IDEALS), et al. and Fair Trade Alliance (FairTrade).

== See also ==
- Japanese settlement in the Philippines
- Filipinos in Japan
