= Greece–Philippines relations =

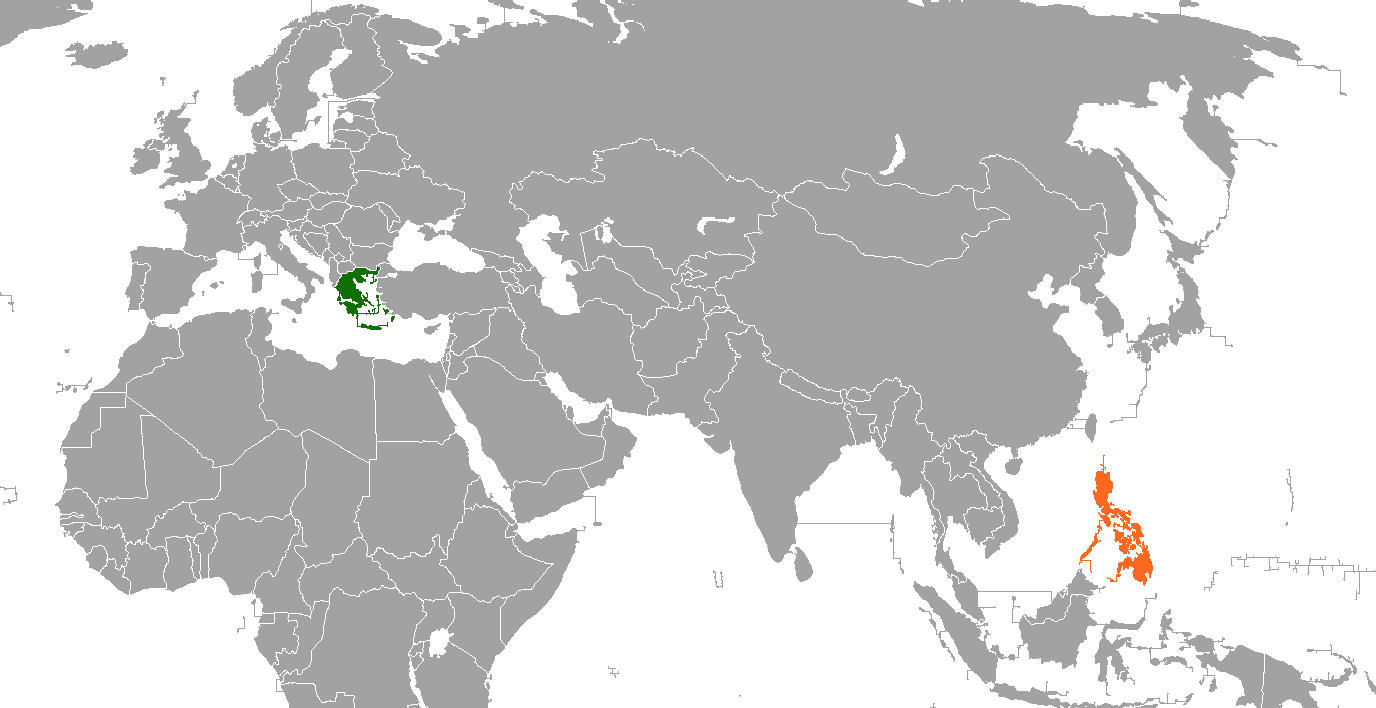

- Greece: Philippines

Greece and the Philippines established their bilateral, diplomatic and trade relations in 1947. Greece has an embassy in Manila and the Philippines has an embassy in Athens.

== Economic relations ==
The Greek city of Thessaloniki are open to enhancing business ties with the Philippines. Thessaloniki located in northern Greece, is the country's second major economic, industrial, commercial and political center, and a major transportation hub for the rest of southeastern Europe.

== Migration ==
According to official Greek statistics, there were 5,000 Filipinos in Greece in 1991, which declined to 2,000 by 1996. In reality, there were many more working in the country illegally. The Philippine community have set up a school for their children in downtown Athens.

A large proportion are women (81% in 1999), who generally find employment as domestic workers.

In 2009 there were 30,000 Filipinos in Greece.

== Greek Community in Philippines ==
According to some historical accounts, there were already Greek settlers in the country as early as the 18th century. Most were sailors, traders, and fishermen.[2]

During the early 20th century, some Greek sailors and immigrants came to the country and settled. One group came to the city of Legazpi.[3] Their descendants on the island of Luzon make up no more than 10 families, who retain their Greek identities and have become distinguished public figures and intellectuals in the community.

Adamson University in Manila was founded by a Greek immigrant, George Lucas Adamson. He also founded the first Greek Orthodox church in the Philippines, two paper mills, and a shipping company.[4] Currently, Greek immigrants and expatriates come into the country to work in businesses or enter as diplomats, tourists, or as friends or family of Filipinos. The Greek community in the Philippines also helps with the Philippine Orthodox Church (with the help of the Hellenic Orthodox Community-Foundation Inc Of Philippines). However, currently, the Greek population in the Philippines is officially unknown but some Greeks are living in the capital, where the location of the Exarchate of the Philippines where there is a small Greek church founded by the Greek community. But during 2013 the Greek embassy estimated about 120 Greeks permanently residing in the Philippines as immigrants, migrants, and ex-pats. Most of them work in shipping and trade, most of them are married to Filipinos and have a permanent residency in the Philippines. However, the current community is small, and very few know about it. As of 2018, the Greek Community in the Philippines has created a Facebook group, called Greeks in the Philippines, Έλληνες στις Φιλιππίνες. Now there is an estimate of 100 Greeks living in the Philippines.

== Other ==
In 2023, military observers from the Philippines followed the exercise of Turkish and Turkish Cypriot forces at the Occupied Cyprus.

== Resident diplomatic missions ==
- Greece has an embassy in Manila.
- The Philippines has an embassy in Athens.

== See also ==
- Foreign relations of Greece
- Foreign relations of the Philippines
- Philippine School in Greece
- Greek settlement in the Philippines
