= St. Mary (Nativity) Church =

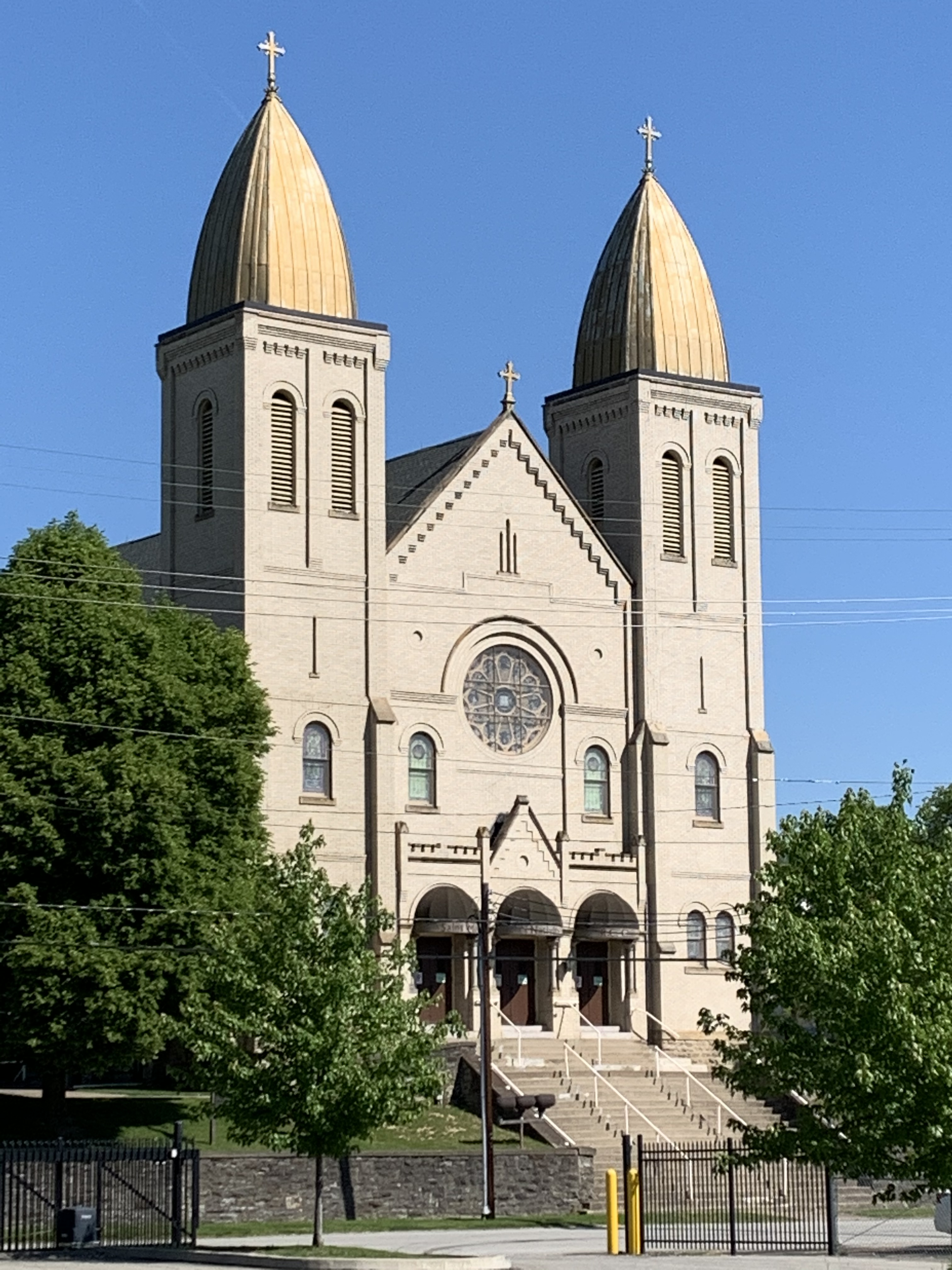
- Church facade in May 2021
- Location: 61 North Mt. Vernon Avenue, Uniontown, Pennsylvania
- Country: United States
- Denomination: Roman Catholic

History
- Status: Parish Church
- Dedication: Nativity of Mary

Architecture
- Style: Romanesque
- Years built: 1911–1912
- Completed: August 25, 1912
- Construction cost: US41,100 (1911)

Administration
- Diocese: Roman Catholic Diocese of Greensburg

St. Mary (Nativity) Church is a Catholic parish church in Uniontown, Pennsylvania in the Diocese of Greensburg. It is built in the Romanesque style.

== History ==
The St. Mary (Nativity) parish was formed in 1903 by parishioners of Slavic heritage. The parish built its first church, a wooden frame building, on the corner of Stockton Street and North Mount Vernon Avenue in 1903 under the guidance of Fr. L. Laush. As the congregation grew to 3,500 members, the wooden structure became inadequate and a new church was planned for the property. A "handsome" brick church was designed and the cornerstone was laid on Sunday July 30, 1911 with the events led by Joseph Maria Koudelka, then-auxiliary bishop of the Roman Catholic Diocese of Cleveland. Bishop Koudelka was chosen to preside over the event because he had held special jurisdiction to the Slavic people in the United States since 1908, the first-ever auxiliary bishop to hold special jurisdiction in the country. The church was completed under Rev. Frank G. Sebik at a cost of $40,000. The three bells, which cost an additional $1,100, were consecrated on May 5, 1912. The church itself was consecrated on August 25, 1912, by then-Bishop of Pittsburgh Regis Canevin.

The parish celebrated its centennial in 2003. Leading up to the celebration, the church underwent a restoration under Rev. Micah Kozoil which included new heating and air conditioning, new altars, new chandeliers, restoration of the pipe organ, painting, new carpeting, and new furnishings. Through a contribution from local philanthropist Joseph A. Hardy III, the church's towers were painted gold; its façade was illuminated; and its electrical system was updated.

== School ==
After the opening of the new church building in 1912, the previous wooden building was converted into a parochial school. The school, which eventually moved into a larger building behind the current church, operated until the end of the 2010–2011 school year when it was merged with Saint John the Evangelist Regional Catholic School, also in Uniontown.

== Gallery ==
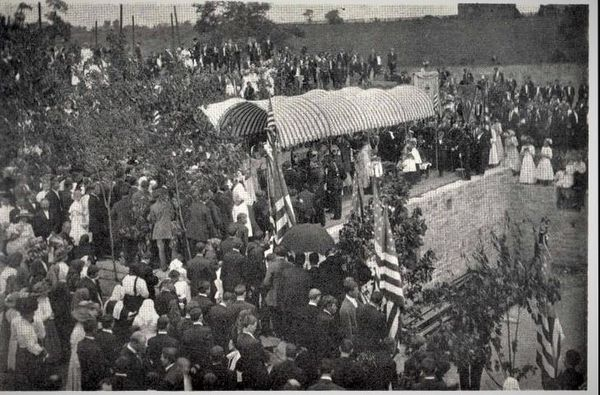
Laying of the cornerstone of the current church on July 30, 1911

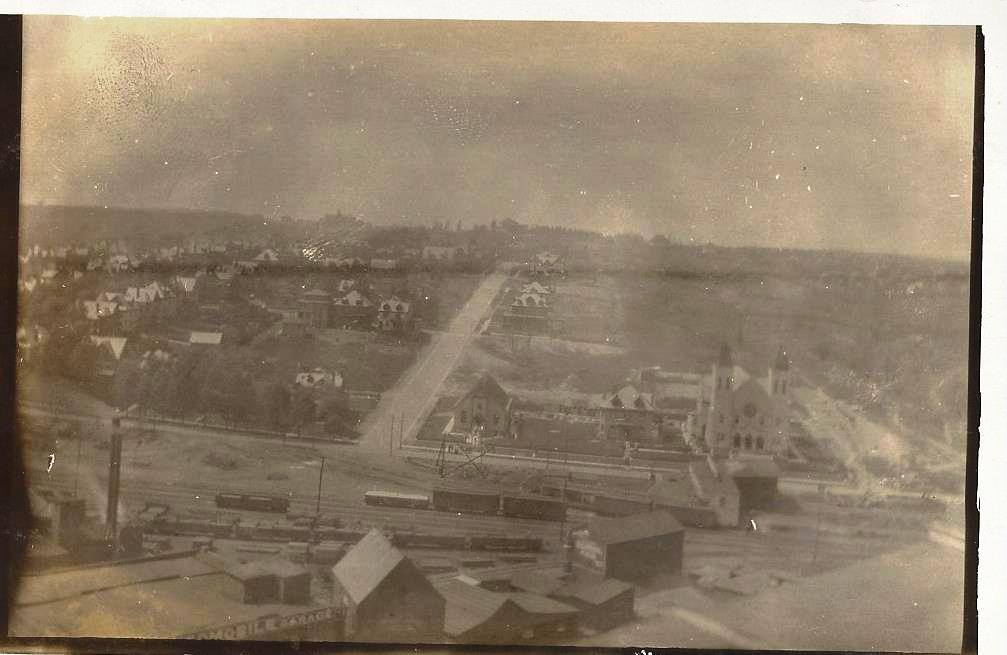
Current St. Mary Nativity Church from above, original church can be seen to the left

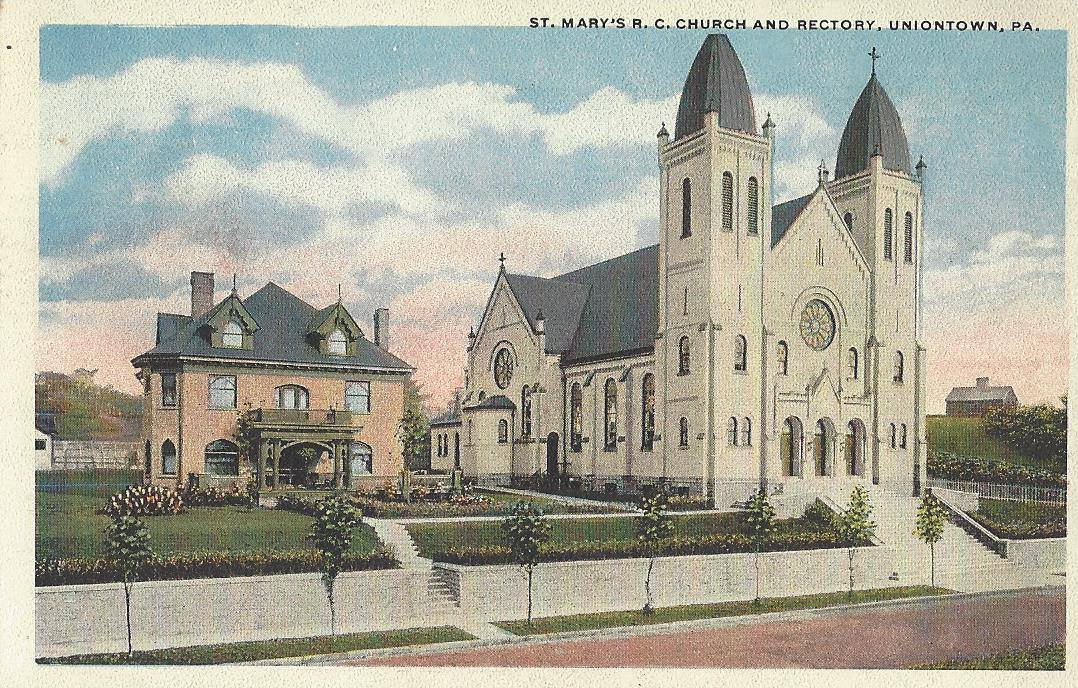
St. Mary Nativity Church and original parish house

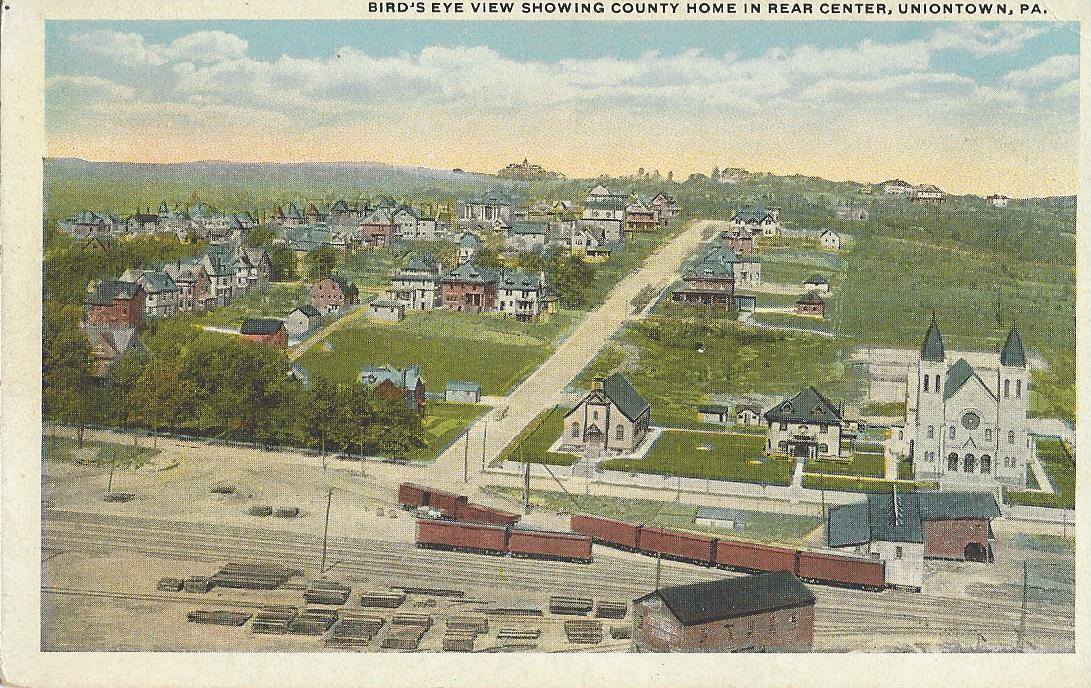
Original and current churches and parish house seen from above
