= Vanessa (name) =

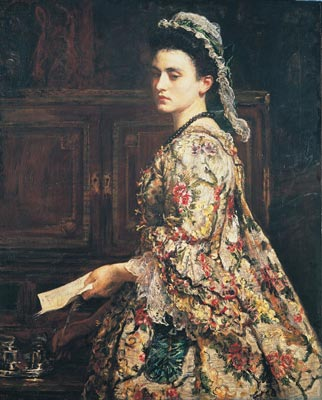
- Vanessa, 1868, by John Everett Millais.
- Pronunciation: /vəˈnɛsə/
- Gender: Female

Origin
- Derivation: coined from Esther Vanhomrigh (Van + Es → Vanessa)
- Meaning: From the star

Other names
- Related names: Vanesa (Spanish, Czech and Slovak), Vanessza (Hungarian), Wanesa (Polish), Vanasia

Vanessa is a feminine given name. It was created by the Anglo-Irish writer Jonathan Swift for Esther Vanhomrigh, whom Swift had met in 1708 and whom he tutored. The name was created by taking "Van" from Vanhomrigh's last name and adding "Essa", a pet form of Esther. Van is a preposition in Dutch surnames that means "of" or "from", and Esther, from which Essa is derived, could be derived from the Old Persian stāra (NPer. ستاره setāra, meaning "star"). Thus, Vanessa could literally mean "from the star".

In 1726, the name Vanessa appeared in print for the first time in "Cadenus and Vanessa", an autobiographical poem about Swift's relationship with Vanhomrigh. Swift had written the poem in 1713, but it was not published until three years after Vanhomrigh died. Vanessa was adopted as the name of a genus of butterfly by Johan Christian Fabricius in 1807.

Vanessa was the 71st most popular name for girls born in the United States in 2007. It has been among the top 200 names for girls in the United States since 1953 and among the top 100 names for girls since 1977. It first appeared among the top 1,000 names for girls in the United States in 1950, when it appeared on the list in 939th place.

In Germany, Vanessa has been among the top 100 names for girls since 1976. The name became more and more popular and was the 7th most popular name for girls in the 1990s. In the following years its popularity dropped and the name is ranked in 42nd place for the decade 2000–2009.

== Notable people with the given name ==
=== Vanesa ===
- Vanesa Agović (born 1996), Montenegrin professional handball player
- Vanesa Amorós (born 1982), Spanish former handball player
- Vanesa Arenas (born 1978), Spanish judoka
- Vanesa Campos (1982–2018), Peruvian trans sex worker
- Vanesa Capó Pérez (born 1982), Spanish Paralympic swimmer
- Vanesa Cejudo, Spanish sociologist and art critic
- Vanesa Emilova (born 2008), Bulgarian rhythmic gymnast
- Vanesa Furlanetto (born 1987), Argentine former tennis player
- Vanesa Gabriela Leiro (born 1992), Argentine actress and singer
- Vanesa Gimbert (born 1980), Spanish retired footballer
- Vanesa Gomez Gonzalez, Spanish software engineer and space scientist
- Vanesa González (born 1987), Argentine actress
- Vanesa Gottifredi (born 1969), Argentine chemist and biologist
- Vanesa Hocková (born 2000), Slovak skeet shooter
- Vanesa Hoti (born 1998), Swiss professional footballer
- Vanesa Kaladzinskaya (born 1992), Belarusian freestyle wrestler
- Vanesa Krauth (born 1981), Argentine former tennis player
- Vanesa Levenaj (born 2001), Albanian footballer
- Vanesa Levendi, Albanian international footballer
- Vanesa Lorenzo (born 1977), Spanish model
- Vanesa Magar Brunner (born 1971), Franco-Mexican scientist
- Vanesa Martín Mata (born 1980), Spanish singer, poet, and songwriter
- Vanesa Massetani (born 1982), Argentine politician
- Vanesa Muñiz (born 1975), Spanish retired rhythmic gymnast
- Vanesa Oshiro (born 1981), Argentine-born Japanese singer
- Vanesa Rakedzhyan (born 1976), Armenian alpine skier
- Vanesa Restrepo (born 1987), Colombian actress and model
- Vanesa Romero (born 1978), Spanish actress and model
- Vanesa Santana (born 1990), Argentine professional footballer
- Vanesa Šelmeková (born 2007), Slovak figure skater
- Vanesa Siley (born 1984), Argentine lawyer, trade unionist, and politician
- Vanesa Sršen (born 1971), Croatian retired volleyball player
- Vanesa Stoycheva (born 2003), Bulgarian footballer
- Vanesa Švédová (born 2003), Czech model and beauty pageant titleholder
- Vanesa Tot (born 1999), Croatian canoeist

=== Vanessa ===
- Vanessa, alternate name of Esther Vanhomrigh (c. 1688–1723), British-Dutch letter writer
- Vanessa Álava (born 1982), Ecuadorian politician
- Vanessa Aleksander (born 1996), Polish actress
- Vanessa Alexander, American-, Australian-, New Zealand-, and British screenwriter, director, and producer
- Vanessa Alfano (born 1976), American television journalist- and personality, reporter, host, and founder of HealthyStyleNY.com
- Vanessa Alfaro, Bolivian-born American designer, entrepreneur, model, and actress
- Vanessa Allen Sutherland, American corporate lawyer
- Vanessa Ament (born 1955), American author, academic, Foley artist, and musician
- Vanessa Amorosi (born 1981), Australian singer-songwriter and recording artist
- Vanessa Anderson, Australian teen whose death led to the Garling Report
- Vanessa Andreu (born 1979), Mexican actress, singer, hostess, and reporter
- Vanessa Angel, several people
- Vanessa Angélica Villarreal, American poet, essayist, and cultural critic
- Vanessa Arauz (born 1989), Ecuadorian football manager
- Vanessa Arscott (?–2004), Thai murder victim
- Vanessa Arteaga (born 1987/1988), American former professional video game player
- Vanessa Atkinson (born 1976), English-born Dutch former professional squash player
- Vanessa Atler (born 1982), American former elite gymnast
- Vanessa Atterbeary (born 1975), American attorney and politician
- Vanessa Axente (born 1995), Hungarian fashion model
- Vanessa Ayala, American visual artist
- Vanessa Baden (born 1985), American actress, writer, director, and producer
- Vanessa Baker (born 1974), Australian former diver
- Vanessa Barata (born 1988), Portuguese politician and lawyer
- Vanessa Barbara (born 1982), Brazilian journalist, novelist, and columnist
- Vanessa Barrs, American-born Australian veterinary scientist and professor
- Vanessa Bauche (born 1973), Mexican television-, theatre-, and film actress
- Vanessa Baudzus, German international footballer
- Vanessa Bauer (born 1996), German professional ice skater
- Vanessa Bayer (born 1981), American actress, comedian, and cast member on Saturday Night Live
- Vanessa Beauchaints, Martinique beauty pageant titleholder
- Vanessa Beavis, New Zealand anaesthesiologist and lecturer
- Vanessa Beecroft (born 1969), Italian-born American contemporary performance artist
- Vanessa Beeley (born 1963/1964), British activist and blogger
- Vanessa Behrendt (born 1984), German politician
- Vanessa Bell (1879–1961), English painter and interior designer; sister of author Virginia Woolf
- Vanessa Bell Armstrong (born 1953), American R&B- and gospel singer
- Vanessa Bell Calloway (born 1957), American actress
- Vanessa Belvedere, Australian student; contestant on Married at First Sight (Australian TV series) season 4
- Vanessa Benelli Mosell (born 1987), Italian pianist and conductor
- Vanessa Bernauer (born 1988), Swiss former footballer
- Vanessa Bishop, British writer
- Vanessa Blé (born 1991), Ivorian-born Spanish professional basketball player
- Vanessa Bleyer (born 1975 or 1976), Australian politician
- Vanessa Block, American film director, producer, and screenwriter
- Vanessa Blockmans (born 2002), Belgian field hockey player
- Vanessa Blue, American pornographic actress, producer, online model, and director
- Vanessa Bolosier, French Caribbean food writer
- Vanessa Borgli (born 1972), Norwegian actress
- Vanessa Borne, ring name of Danielle Kamela (born 1988), American professional wrestler and actress
- Vanessa Boslak (born 1982), French pole vaulter
- Vanessa Boubryemm (born 1982), French freestyle wrestler
- Vanessa Bowen (born 1974), Sri Lankan former cricketer
- Vanessa Bradley (born 1976), Australian former rugby union player
- Vanessa Brady (born 1959), English interior designer and businesswoman
- Vanessa Branch (born 1973), English-American actress and model
- Vanessa Branson (born 1959), English businesswoman and author; founder of the Marrakech Biennale
- Vanessa Briscoe Hay (born 1955), American singer
- Vanessa Brown (1928–1999), Austrian-born American radio-, film-, theater-, and television actress
- Vanessa Bruno, French clothing designer; former model, singer, and actress
- Vanessa Bryant (born 1982), American businesswoman, philanthropist, nonprofit executive, former model, and widow of NBA player Kobe Bryant
- Vanessa Burggraf (born 1971), French journalist, television presenter, and columnist
- Vanessa Bürki (born 1986), Swiss former footballer
- Vanessa Byrnes, New Zealand director, actress, and educator
- Vanessa C. Tyson, American political scientist, politician, and associate professor of politics
- Vanessa Cailhol, French actress, dancer, and singer
- Vanessa Cantave (born 1977), American chef
- Vanessa Cárdenas (born 1981), Venezuelan model and beauty pageant titleholder
- Vanessa Carlton (born 1980), American singer-songwriter, pianist, and actress
- Vanessa Carswell, New Zealand architect
- Vanessa Caston LaFleur, American attorney and politician
- Vanessa Caswill, English director and screenwriter
- Vanessa Cattoi (born 1980), Italian politician
- Vanessa Cavanagh (1983–2002), English actress and singer
- Vanessa Chalá (born 1990), Ecuadorian judoka
- Vanessa Chefer Spínola (born 1990), Brazilian heptathlete
- Vanessa Chikupira (born 1996), Malawian footballer
- Vanessa Chinitor (born 1976), Belgian singer
- Vanessa Chu (born 1994), Hong Kong professional squash player
- Vanessa Civiello (born 1991), German contestant on Deutschland sucht den Superstar season 6
- Vanessa Claire Stewart (born 1976), American actress, producer, and writer
- Vanessa Claudio (born 1983), Puerto Rican television personality, model, and former beauty pageant contestant
- Vanessa Clerveaux (born 1994), American-born Haitian hurdler
- Vanessa Coello (born 1995), Venezuelan model and beauty pageant titleholder
- Vanessa Coffey (born 1958), American television- and film producer
- Vanessa Coleman (born 1988), American criminal convicted of facilitating the kidnapping, robbery, rape, and murder of Channon Christian
- Vanessa Collier, American blues-, funk-, and soul saxophonist, singer, and songwriter
- Vanessa Collingridge (born 1968), English author and broadcaster
- Vanessa Cootes (born 1969), New Zealand former rugby union player
- Vanessa Córdoba (born 1995), Colombian professional footballer
- Vanessa Corish, Australian-born singer-songwriter and record producer
- Vanessa Cozzi (born 1984), Brazilian Olympic rower
- Vanessa Cristina de Souza (born 1989), Brazilian wheelchair racer
- Vanessa Crone (born 1990), Canadian former competitive ice dancer
- Vanessa Cruez (born 1996), Malaysian model, actress, and director
- Vanessa Curry (born c. 1990), American model, dancer, and singer
- Vanessa Czarnecki (born 1979), American-born Greek softball player
- Vanessa Dalzon (born 1996), Haitian journalist and author
- Vanessa da Mata (born 1976), Brazilian singer, songwriter, and novelist
- Vanessa Daou (born 1967), American singer, songwriter, poet, visual artist, and dancer
- Vanessa Davies (born 1969), Venezuelan journalist
- Vanessa Davis, several people
- Vanessa de Jesus (born 2002), Filipino-American college basketball player
- Vanessa de la Torre (born 1978), Colombian journalist
- Vanessa Delgado (born 1977), American politician and housing advocate
- Vanessa de Lisle, English fashion journalist
- Vanessa del Rio (born 1952), American retired pornographic actress
- Vanessa de Luca, American journalist and magazine editor
- Vanessa Demopoulos (born 1988), American mixed martial artist
- Vanessa Demouy (born 1973), French actress and model
- Vanessa de Oliveira (born 1975), Brazilian writer and former call girl
- Vanessa De Roide (born 1987), Puerto Rican TV host, model, and beauty pageant titleholder
- Vanessa DiBernardo (born 1992), American NWSL player
- Vanessa Diffenbaugh (born 1978), American non-fiction writer and novelist
- Vanessa DiMauro (born 1967), American community builder, researcher, and non-fiction writer
- Vanessa Djiepmou (born 1990), Cameroonian handball player
- Vanessa Djomo (born 1998), Cameroonian footballer
- Vanessa Dobos, American Air Force aerial gunner
- Vanessa Dorman (born 1969), American actress
- Vanessa Downing (born 1958), Australian actress, theatre director, singer, voice artist, and lawyer
- Vanessa Duriès (1972–1993), French novelist
- Vanessa E. Wyche, American engineer and civil servant
- Vanessa Echols (born 1960), American former television journalist and news anchor
- Vanessa Elliott, Australian geologist
- Vanessa Emme, Irish stage- and television actress
- Vanessa Engle (born 1961/1962), English documentary filmmaker
- Vanessa English (born 1989), Brazilian jiu-jitsu competitor and instructor
- Vanessa Erogbogbo, Ugandan private sector development specialist
- Vanessa Erskine (born 1994), American-born German wheelchair basketball player
- Vanessa Ezenwa, American ecologist, and professor of ecology and evolutionary biology
- Vanessa Feliciano (born 1990), Brazilian chess player
- Vanessa Feltz (born 1962), English television presenter, broadcaster, and journalist
- Vanessa Ferlito (born 1977), American actress
- Vanessa Fernandes (born 1985), Portuguese Olympic athlete
- Vanessa Fernandez (born 1982), Singaporean singer and radio presenter
- Vanessa Fernández (born 1993), Dominican footballer
- Vanessa Ferrari (born 1990), Italian retired artistic gymnast
- Vanessa Filho (born 1980), French film director and screenwriter
- Vanessa Fischer, several people
- Vanessa Flores (born 1997), American-born Mexican footballer
- Vanessa Foliaki (born 1993), New Zealand-born Australian rugby league footballer
- Vanessa Forero, English-Colombian singer-songwriter and author
- Vanessa Frazier (born 1969), Maltese diplomat
- Vanessa Freebairn-Smith, American cellist
- Vanessa Freire (born 1978), Ecuadorian politician
- Vanessa Friedman (born 1967), American fashion journalist
- Vanessa Fuchs (born 1996), German model
- Vanessa Fudalla (born 2001), German footballer
- Vanessa Gajdek (born 2005), Austrian association footballer
- Vanessa Galindo (born 2002), Colombian rhythmic gymnast
- Vanessa García (born 1984), Puerto Rican Olympic freestyle swimmer
- Vanessa Garcia (artist), Cuban-American writer and multidisciplinary artist
- Vanessa Gearson, British writer in the Betsygate political scandal
- Vanessa George (born 1970), English nursery worker and paedophile convicted in the 2009 Plymouth child abuse case
- Vanessa Gerbelli (born 1973), Brazilian actress
- Vanessa german (born 1976), American sculptor, painter, writer, activist, performer, and poet
- Vanessa Getty (born 1972), American socialite and philanthropist
- Vanessa Giácomo (born 1983), Brazilian actress and screenwriter
- Vanessa Gibson (born 1979), American politician
- Vanessa Gidden (born 1985), Jamaican professional basketball player
- Vanessa Gilles (born 1996), Canadian professional soccer player
- Vanessa Gilmore (born 1956), American former district judge
- Vanessa Giunchi (born 1980), Italian former competitive figure skater
- Vanessa Gladone (born 1982), French former triple- and long jumper
- Vanessa Gleason (born 1979), American Playboy model and actress
- Vanessa Glodjo (born 1974), Bosnia and Hercegovinian actress
- Vanessa Gold (businesswoman) (born 1967), English businesswoman
- Vanessa Gonçalves (born 1986), Venezuelan yoga teacher, dentist, model, and beauty pageant titleholder
- Vanessa González, several people
- Vanessa Goodwin (1969–2018), Australian politician
- Vanessa Gounden (born 1961), South African entrepreneur, fashion designer, and politician
- Vanessa Grant (1946–2023), Canadian romance novelist
- Vanessa Grasse (born 1992), English actress
- Vanessa Gravina (born 1974), Italian film-, television-, and stage actress and director
- Vanessa Gray (born 1971), English former rugby union player
- Vanessa Grazziotin (born 1961), Brazilian politician
- Vanessa Green, New Zealand educational theorist and academic
- Vanessa Greene (1954–2017), British-American television producer and screenwriter
- Vanessa Grenier, Canadian pair skater
- Vanessa Griffen, Fijian academic and writer
- Vanessa Grigoriadis, American journalist
- Vanessa Grimberg (born 1993), German Olympic swimmer
- Vanessa Grimm, Australian television journalist and news presenter
- Vanessa Grimm (athlete) (born 1997), German multi-event athlete
- Vanessa Gronemann (born 1989), German politician
- Vanessa Grossl (born 1980), American politician
- Vanessa Grout, American real estate entrepreneur, investor, and journalist
- Vanessa Grubbs, American nephrologist, writer, and associate professor
- Vanessa Guerra (born 1989), American politician
- Vanessa Guillén (2000–2020), American murdered army soldier
- Vanessa Gusméroli (born 1978), French former competitive figure skater and water skier
- Vanessa Guthrie (born 1961), Australian businesswoman
- Vanessa Guzmán (born 1976), Mexican actress, model, and beauty pageant titleholder
- Vanessa Hall-Smith (born 1951), English lawyer, musician, and writer
- Vanessa Harding (born 1970), American semi-retired professional wrestler and manager
- Vanessa Harding (historian), British academic, professor, and historian
- Vanessa Harris, American lawyer and judge
- Vanessa Harwood (born 1947), English-born Canadian ballet dancer, choreographer, artistic director, teacher, and actress
- Vanessa Hayden (born 1982), American college basketball- and WNBA player
- Vanessa Hayes, South African-Australian geneticist
- Vanessa Hegelmaier (born 1987), German fashion model
- Vanessa Hehir (born 1981), English actress
- Vanessa Heleta, Tongan women's rights activist and Special Olympics organizer
- Vanessa Henke (born 1981), German former professional tennis player
- Vanessa Herrera (born 1987), Ecuadorian former footballer
- Vanessa Herrick (born 1958), English retired Anglican priest
- Vanessa Herrmann (born 1991), Thai-German actress, model, and beauty pageant titleholder
- Vanessa Herzog (born 1995), Austrian speed skater
- Vanessa Hessler (born 1988), Italian-born American model and actress
- Vanessa Hill (born 1987), Australian television presenter and science communicator
- Vanessa Hinz (born 1992), German former biathlete and cross-country skier
- Vanessa Hobbs (born 1987), English artistic gymnast
- Vanessa Hoelsher (born 1982), American Playboy model
- Vanessa Hogge (born 1963), Kenyan-born British ceramic artist
- Vanessa Hollingshead, American actress and stand-up comedian
- Vanessa Hooper, English retired ballerina and theatre dancer and current dance teacher, freelance choreographer, lecturer, and examiner
- Vanessa Hoppe (born 1979), Chilean lawyer and politician
- Vanessa Howard (1948–2010), English film actress and professional backup singer
- Vanessa Hua, American writer and journalist
- Vanessa Hudgens (born 1988), American actress and singer
- Vanessa Hudson, several people
- Vanessa Huppenkothen (born 1984), Mexican model, actress, and television presenter
- Vanessa Huxford (born 1970), English former rugby union player
- Vanessa Ifediora, Irish actress, photographer, and poet
- Vanessa Incontrada (born 1978), Spanish-Italian actress and model
- Vanessa Jackson (born 1953), British painter
- Vanessa James (disambiguation), several people
- Vanessa Jean Dedmon (born 1987), German singer
- Vanessa Jennings (born 1952), American Kiowa/Ná'ishą Apache/Gila River Pima regalia maker, clothing designer, cradleboard maker, and beadwork artist
- Vanessa Jeri (born 1979), Peruvian comedy actress and model
- Vanessa Jung (born 1980), German actress
- Vanessa K. Valdés, American author, educator, writer, editor, historian, and professor
- Vanessa Kaiser (born 1977), Chilean columnist and politician
- Vanessa Kamga (born 1998), Swedish discus thrower
- Vanessa Kara (born 1996), American-born Dominican Republic professional footballer
- Vanessa Karungi (born 1999), Ugandan footballer
- Vanessa Kerry (born 1976), American physician, public health expert, and advocate
- Vanessa-Kim Zobel (born 1988), German politician
- Vanessa King (born 1980), Canadian former actress
- Vanessa Kingori, Kenyan-born British businesswoman, writer, director, and publisher
- Vanessa Kirby (born 1987/1988), English actress
- Vanessa Kirsch, American social entrepreneur
- Vanessa Körndl (born 1997), German taekwondo athlete
- Vanessa Koutouan (born 1988), Ivorian women's rights activist
- Vanessa Krasniqi (born 1994), Albanian-German singer
- Vanessa Kraven (born 1982), Canadian professional wrestler
- Vanessa Krüger (born 1991), German actress
- Vanessa Kwan, Canadian art curator and artist
- Vanessa L. Brown (born 1966), American former politician who was convicted of bribery
- Vanessa L. Ochs (born 1953), American scholar of religion, writer, and rabbi
- Vanessa Lachey (born 1980), American television personality- and host, model, and actress
- Vanessa Lam (born 1995), American former figure skater
- Vanessa Landi (born 1997), Italian archer
- Vanessa Lann (born 1968), American-Dutch composer and pianist
- Vanessa Lapa (born 1975), Israeli documentary filmmaker
- Vanessa Latarche, British pianist, educator, and professor of piano
- Vanessa Lawrence (born 1962), British businesswoman, geographer, and international speaker
- Vanessa Layton-McIntosh, English student; contestant on Big Brother (British TV series) series 6
- Vanessa Lee (disambiguation), several people
- Vanessa Legault-Cordisco (born 1992), Canadian former professional soccer player
- Vanessa Leggett (born 1968), American freelance journalist and lecturer who was jailed for not revealing sources
- Vanessa Leimenstoll (born 2001), German footballer
- Vanessa Lemm, German-Australian philosopher
- Vanessa Lengies (born 1985), Canadian actress, dancer, and singer
- Vanessa Lepage-Joanisse (born 1995), Canadian professional boxer
- Vanessa Lesnicki, real name of Shay (rapper) (born 1992), Belgian francophone rapper
- Vanessa Lillie, American Cherokee suspense- and mystery writer
- Vanessa Lillo Gómez (born 1983), Spanish politician
- Vanessa Lima Vidal (born 1984), Brazilian volleyball player, model, and beauty pageant titleholder
- Vanessa Lindores, Canadian actress who was a cast member on You Can't Do That on Television
- Vanessa Lloyd-Davies (1960–2005), English doctor, equestrian, and soldier
- Vanessa Lóes (born 1971), Brazilian actress
- Vanessa Lopes (born 2001), Brazilian social media personality, digital influencer, and dancer
- Vanessa Low (born 1990), German-born Australian Paralympic athlete
- Vanessa Lubach, English artist
- Vanessa Lynne Bryant (born 1954), American district judge
- Vanessa M. Hirsch, Canadian-American veterinary pathologist and scientist
- Vanessa-Mae (born 1978), Singapore-born English violinist and Olympic alpine skier
- Vanessa Mahi, real name of Ivorian Doll (born 1997), British-German rapper and Internet personality
- Vanessa Mai (born 1992), German singer
- Vanessa Marano (born 1992), American actress
- Vanessa Marcil (born 1968), American actress
- Vanessa Marcotte (1989–2016), American murder victim
- Vanessa Marina (born 1992), Portuguese breaker
- Vanessa Mark (born 1996), German bobsledder
- Vanessa Marques (born 1996), Portuguese association footballer
- Vanessa Marquez (1968–2018), American actress
- Vanessa Marshall (born 1969), American actress and voice actress
- Vanessa Martin (born 1946), British historian and emeritus professor of Middle Eastern history
- Vanessa Martinez (actress), American actress
- Vanessa Martini (born 1989), German footballer
- Vanessa Matz (born 1973), Belgian politician
- Vanessa McCarthy, American television producer and writer
- Vanessa McNeal (born 1993), American social activist, public speaker, and documentary filmmaker
- Vanessa Mdee (born 1988), Tanzanian former recording artist, VJ, rapper, singer, television personality, and radio host
- Vanessa Melo (born 1988), Brazilian mixed martial artist
- Vanessa Meloche (born 1985), Canadian gymnast
- Vanessa Mendoza (born 1981), Colombian politician, actress, fashion model, and beauty pageant titleholder
- Vanessa Mendoza Cortés (born 1980), Andorran psychologist and human rights activist
- Vanessa Menga (born 1976), Brazilian former professional tennis player
- Vanessa Merrell (born 1996), American actress, producer, musician, singer, songwriter, and YouTuber
- Vanessa Mesquita (born 1986), Brazilian model, bodybuilder, activist, and reality television personality
- Vanessa Middleton, American film- and television director, producer, and writer
- Vanessa Miranville (born 1983), French politician and mayor
- Vanessa Mock (born 1975), French-born German radio journalist
- Vanessa Moesta (born 1992), Congolese handball player
- Vanessa Monaghan, Irish radio presenter
- Vanessa Moody (born 1995), American model
- Vanessa Morgan (born 1992), Canadian actress
- Vanessa Moungar (born 1984), French-Chadian businesswoman
- Vanessa Nakate (born 1996), Ugandan climate justice activist
- Vanessa Neigert (born 1992), Italian contestant on Deutschland sucht den Superstar season 6
- Vanessa Neo (born 1987), Singaporean former badminton player
- Vanessa Neumann (born 1972), Venezuelan-American diplomat, business owner, author, and political theorist
- Vanessa Neumann, real name of Happinessa (born 1990), German racing driver
- Vanessa Nimmo, South African contestant on Big Brother (British TV series) series 5
- Vanessa Noel (born 1961), American shoe designer, hotelier, gallery owner, and philanthropist
- Vanessa Northington Gamble (born 1953), American physician
- Vanessa Nsona, Malawian fashion designer and entrepreneur
- Vanessa Nygaard (born 1975), American professional basketball coach and former WNBA player
- Vanessa O'Brien (born 1964), English-American mountaineer, sub-orbital spaceflight participant, explorer, and former business executive
- Vanessa O'Connell, American journalist, author, editor, and reporter
- Vanessa O'Hanlon, Australian television presenter- and personality
- Vanessa Olivarez (born 1981), American singer, songwriter, and actress
- Vanessa Oliver, American politician
- Vanessa O'Loughlin, Irish literary coach
- Vanessa Oriolo, American beauty pageant titleholder
- Vanessa Otero, American patent attorney; founder of corporation Ad Fontes Media
- Vanessa Ovando (born 1990), Guatemalan retired footballer
- Vanessa Palacios (born 1984), Peruvian volleyball player
- Vanessa Panousis (born 1995), Australian professional basketball player
- Vanessa Panov (born 1999), Canadian group rhythmic gymnast
- Vanessa Pappas, birth name of V Pappas (born 1978/1979), Australian-American business executive
- Vanessa Paradis (born 1972), French singer, model, and actress
- Vanessa Parise, American film director, writer, producer, and actress
- Vanessa Peh (born 1994), Singaporean actress, model, entrepreneur, and beauty pageant titleholder
- Vanessa Peretti (born 1986), Venezuelan model and beauty pageant titleholder
- Vanessa Perroncel, French model; former partner of former footballer Wayne Bridge
- Vanessa Peters (born 1980), American singer and songwriter
- Vanessa Peterson, Australian neutron instrument scientist and professor
- Vanessa Petruo (born 1979), German former singer, songwriter, actress, and television personality
- Vanessa Pirotta, Australian wildlife scientist, science communicator, and author
- Vanessa Place (born 1968), American novelist, poet, and attorney
- Vanessa Platacis (born 1973), American contemporary artist
- Vanessa Ponce (born 1992), Mexican model and beauty queen
- Vanessa Porto (born 1984), Brazilian mixed martial artist and boxer
- Vanessa Pose (born 1990), Venezuelan actress
- Vanessa Prager (born 1984), American painter
- Vanessa Proux (born 1974), French biologist
- Vanessa Pulgarin (born 1991), Colombian model and beauty pageant titleholder
- Vanessa Quai (born 1988), Vanuatuan singer
- Vanessa Quin (born 1976), New Zealand BMX- and downhill rider
- Vanessa Quinones, French-born English singer-songwriter
- Vanessa R. Avery (born 1974/1975), American lawyer
- Vanessa Radman (born 1974), Croatian actress
- Vanessa Raissa Uwase, Rwandan beauty pageant contestant
- Vanessa Raj (born 1996), Malaysian professional squash player
- Vanessa Ramos, American television writer and producer
- Vanessa Rare, New Zealand film- and television actress, screenwriter, and director
- Vanessa Raw (born 1984), English artist and former professional triathlete
- Vanessa Ray (born 1981), American actress
- Vanessa Raynbird (born 1953), English former footballer
- Vanessa Redgrave (born 1937), English actress and political activist
- Vanessa Reed (born 1974), British music executive and cultural leader
- Vanessa Rial (born 1982), Spanish former rugby sevens player
- Vanessa Riley, American novelist of historical-, romance-, and mystery fiction
- Vanessa Riopel (born 1990), Canadian baseball pitcher
- Vanessa Rivas (born 1996), Dominican Republic swimmer
- Vanessa Robins, Australian mathematician
- Vanessa Rodrigues, birth name of Filipa Rodrigues (born 1993), Portuguese professional footballer
- Vanessa Romanelli, American contestant on reality TV dating game show A Shot at Love with Tila Tequila
- Vanessa Romito, Australian pharmacy manager; contestant on Married at First Sight (Australian TV series) season 7
- Vanessa Rosales Altamar, Colombian author
- Vanessa Rosenthal (1943–2022), English actress and playwright
- Vanessa Roth, American documentary filmmaker, writer, producer, and director
- Vanessa Rousso (born 1983), American professional poker player, attorney, DJ, and television personality
- Vanessa Rubin (born 1957), American jazz vocalist
- Vanessa Rubio (born 1983), American actress
- Vanessa Rubio Márquez (born 1972), Mexican politician and economist
- Vanessa Ruiz (born 1950), Puerto Rican-born American associate judge
- Vanessa Ruta, American neuroscientist
- Vanessa Sabrina Gnaegi, birth name of Ladyva (born 1988), Swiss boogie woogie-, blues-, and jazz musician, pianist, singer, and composer
- Vanessa Sanchez (born 1971), American past member of professional wrestling dance team The Nitro Girls
- Vanessa Sánchez (born 1995), Mexican professional footballer
- Vanessa Sancho-Shimizu, English academic of infections
- Vanessa Sarno (born 2003), Filipino weightlifter
- Vanessa Sauzede (born 1982), French rhythmic gymnast
- Vanessa Scalera (born 1977), Italian television-, stage-, and film actress
- Vanessa Scammell, Australian pianist and conductor
- Vanessa Schaefer (born 2005), Swiss Canadian ice hockey player
- Vanessa Schneider (born 1969), French political journalist and writer
- Vanessa Schulz (born 1969), South African-born American documentary filmmaker, director, producer, writer, editor, photographer, and political activist
- Vanessa Sears (born 1993), Canadian actress and singer
- Vanessa Selbst (born 1984), American poker player
- Vanessa Semrow, American model and beauty queen
- Vanessa Senior (born 1978), Venezuelan comedian and actress
- Vanessa Seward (born 1969), Argentine-born French fashion designer
- Vanessa Sheehan (born 1973), American politician
- Vanessa Shih (born 1962), Taiwanese diplomat
- Vanessa Short Bull (born 1978), American beauty pageant titleholder
- Vanessa Show (1950–2023), Argentine travesti performer
- Vanessa Siddle Walker, American professor of African American studies
- Vanessa Silberman, American guitarist, background singer, songwriter, record producer, recording engineer, and A&R
- Vanessa Silva, Venezuelan sprint canoe kayaker
- Vanessa Simmons (born 1983), American television personality and actress
- Vanessa Solari Espinoza (born 1982), Venezuelan-born American multi-dimensional artist
- Vanessa Spence (born 1961), Jamaican novelist
- Vanessa Sperandio (born 1970), American professor of microbiology
- Vanessa Springora (born 1972), French publisher, writer, and film director
- Vanessa Stacey (born 1978), New Zealand film-, television-, and stage actress, and musician, director, producer, playwright, singer, songwriter, and comedian
- Vanessa Sterckendries (born 1995), Belgian hammer thrower
- Vanessa Stokes, Australian softball pitcher
- Vanessa Struhler (born 1985), German singer and songwriter
- Vanessa Suárez (born 1991), Venezuelan actress, singer, and model
- Vanessa Summers (born 1958), American politician and business owner
- Vanessa Susanna (born 1997), Dutch footballer
- Vanessa Taylor (born 1970), American screenwriter and television producer
- Vanessa Teague, Australian cryptographer
- Vanessa Terkes (born 1978), Peruvian film-, television-, and stage actress
- Vanessa Tevi (born 1991), Malaysian Chindian model and beauty pageant titleholder
- Vanessa Thibodeau, Canadian candidate in the Green Party of Quebec candidates in the 2007 Quebec provincial election
- Vanessa Tomlinson (born 1971), Australian percussionist, composer, artistic director, and educator
- Vanessa Tonoli, Dutch-Swiss curler
- Vanessa Torres (born 1986), American professional skateboarder
- Vanessa Toulmin (born 1967), English academic, professor, and director of city culture and public engagement
- Vanessa Trump (born 1977), American model; ex-wife of businessman and activist Donald Trump Jr
- Vanessa Upson (born 2003), Canadian PWHL player
- Vanessa Uri, birth name of Halina Perez (1983–2004), Filipina actress
- Vanessa van Arendonk (born 1980), Curaçaoan model and beauty pageant titleholder
- Vanessa Van Cartier (born 1979), Belgian-Dutch drag queen
- Vanessa Vandy (born 1989), New Zealand-born Finnish film director, cinematographer, and former pole vaulter
- Vanessa Van Edwards (born 1985), American public speaker, author, and online instructor of human behavior
- Vanessa Vanjie Mateo, American drag queen
- Vanessa van Kooperen (born 1972), German former Olympic field hockey player
- Vanessa van Uden, New Zealand former mayor
- Vanessa Veiga (born 1979), Spanish long-distance runner
- Vanessa Vélez (born 1989), Puerto Rican volleyball player
- Vanessa Veselka (born 1969), American novelist
- Vanessa Vidal (born 1974), French former alpine skier
- Vanessa Villalobos (born 2001), Mexican badminton player
- Vanessa Villela (born 1978), Mexican-American actress and real estate agent
- Vanessa Virgen (born 1984), Mexican beach volleyball player
- Vanessa Vo, American-Vietnamese musician
- Vanessa Voigt (born 1997), German biathlete
- Vanessa Wagner (born 1973), French classical pianist
- Vanessa Wahlen (born 1995), German retired footballer
- Vanessa Wairata Edwards (born 1980), New Zealand printmaking artist
- Vanessa Waldref (born 1980), American lawyer
- Vanessa Wallace (born 1977), English Paralympic shot putter and javelin thrower
- Vanessa Walters (born 1978), English novelist, playwright, commentator, and critic
- Vanessa Wang, alternate name of Scarlett Wang (born 1991), Chinese actress and model
- Vanessa Ward (born 1963), Australian retired high jumper
- Vanessa Ware (born 1985), Australian former netball player
- Vanessa Watts (born 1987), West Indian cricketer
- Vanessa Webb (born 1976), Canadian former professional tennis player and current tennis director
- Vanessa Weenink (born 1978), New Zealand politician
- Vanessa Whitburn (born 1951), British radio producer and former editor
- Vanessa White (born 1989), English singer and dancer; past member of girl group The Saturdays
- Vanessa Williams (disambiguation), several people
- Vanessa Winship (born 1960), English photographer
- Vanessa Wood (born 1983), American engineer and professor
- Vanessa Woods (born 1977), Australian science writer, author, and journalist
- Vanessa Wruble (born 1974), American entrepreneur, journalist, and activist
- Vanessa YT, American past member of electropunk band Mindless Self Indulgence
- Vanessa Zachos, South African-born English film- and television actress
- Vanessa Zahorian (born 1978/1979), American retired ballet dancer
- Vanessa Zamarripa (born 1990), American stunt actress and former artistic gymnast
- Vanessa Zambotti (born 1982), Mexican judoka
- Vanessa Zamora (born 1991), Mexican/American singer, songwriter, and producer
- Vanessa Zhao, alternate name of Zhao Wenqi (born 1987), Chinese actress and model
- Vanessa Ziegler (born 1999), German footballer
- Vanessa Zima (born 1986), American actress
- Vanessa Zoltan, American humanist chaplain, podcaster, and non-fiction writer

=== Vannesa ===
- Vannesa Rosales (born 1989), Venezuelan activist and teacher

== Fictional characters ==
- Queen Vanessa, in the 2017 platform video game A Hat in Time
- Vanessa, in the 1982 Mexican TV series Vanessa, played by Lucía Méndez
- Vanessa (King of Fighters), in The King of Fighters fighting video game series
- Vanessa, in the 1989 US animated musical fantasy film The Little Mermaid, voiced by Jodi Benson
- Vanessa, in the animated TV series Winx Club, voiced by Barbara De Bortoli (Italian) and April Stewart (English)
- Vanessa, in the 2009 animated fantasy film Barbie: Thumbelina, voiced by Kathleen Barr
- Vanessa, in the Canadian animated adventure mystery TV series The Hollow, voiced by Diana Kaarina
- Vanessa, in the mobile rhythm game Cytus, and in the sequel Cytus II, voiced by Tomori Kusunoki
- Vanessa, in the 2021 survival horror video game Five Nights at Freddy's: Security Breach, and in its film adaptations
- Vanessa, in the musical In The Heights, played by Sheena Marie Ortiz, Karen Olivo, Yvette González-Nacer, Jade Ewen, and Vanessa Hudgens
- Vanessa, in the UK TV soap opera Coronation Street, played by Gabrielle Drake
- Vanessa Abrams, in the US teen drama TV series Gossip Girl, played by Jessica Szohr
- Vanessa Ambres, in the US superhero TV series The Flash, played by Lossen Chambers
- Vanessa Balboa, in the Mexican TV series Vecinos, played by Roxana Castellanos
- Vanessa Baxter, in the US sitcom Last Man Standing, played by Nancy Travis
- Vanessa Bennett, in the US TV soap opera All My Children, played by Marj Dusay
- Vanessa Bird, in the UK TV soap opera EastEnders, played by Sara Houghton
- Vanessa Bloome, in the 2007 US animated satirical comedy film Bee Movie, voiced by Renée Zellweger
- Vanessa Bradshaw, in the Australian TV soap opera Neighbours, played by Julieanne Tait
- Vanessa Brooks, in the US comic book publisher Marvel Comics
- Vanessa Carlysle, in the US Deadpool comics
- Vanessa Chamberlain Lewis, in the US daytime soap opera Guiding Light, played by Maeve Kinkead and Anna Stuart
- Vanessa Cleveland, in the 2010 US novel Daughters of the Moon
- Vanessa Dale, in the US soap opera Love of Life, played by Peggy McCay, Bonnie Bartlett, and Audrey Peters
- Vanessa Deveraux, in the US drama TV series Dynasty, played by Jade Payton
- Vanessa Diaz, in the US drama TV series Six Feet Under, played by Justina Machado
- Vanessa Diodati, in the Japanese anime TV series Symphogear, voiced by Mao Ichimichi
- Vanessa Doofenshmirtz, in the US animated musical-comedy TV series Phineas and Ferb, voiced by Olivia Olson
- Vanessa Enoteca, in the Japanese manga series Black Clover, voiced by Nana Mizuki (Japanese) and Lydia Mackay (English)
- Vanessa Finney, in the UK TV soap opera Coronation Street, played by Rachael Elizabeth
- Vanessa Fisk, in the Marvel Comic Universe, played by Ayelet Zurer in the US TV series Daredevil
- Vanessa Gekko, in the US adult animated tragicomedy TV series BoJack Horseman, voiced by Kristin Chenoweth
- Vanessa Gold, in the UK TV soap opera EastEnders, played by Zöe Lucker
- Vanessa Griffin, in the 2005 US adult animated direct-to-video adventure comedy TV film Stewie Griffin: The Untold Story, voiced by Alex Borstein
- Vanessa Harper, in the US superhero crime drama TV series Gotham, played by Kelcy Griffin
- Vanessa Hart, in the US TV soap opera Sunset Beach, played by Sherri Saum
- Vanessa Huxtable, in the US TV sitcom The Cosby Show, played by Tempestt Bledsoe
- Vanessa Hysel, in the 2018 role-playing video game Octopath Traveler
- Vanessa Ives, in the horror drama TV series Penny Dreadful, played by Eva Green
- Vanessa James, in the Stargate Universe, played by Julia Benson
- Vanessa Jansen, in the US superhero TV series The Flash, played by Erin Cummings
- Vanessa "Nessa" Jenkins, in the UK sitcom Gavin & Stacey, played by Ruth Jones
- Vanessa "Nessie" Kapatelis, in the US Wonder Woman comic book series
- Vanessa Kensington, in the 1997 US spy comedy film Austin Powers: International Man of Mystery, played by Elizabeth Hurley
- Vanessa Lewis, in the Virtua Fighter fighting video game series
- Vanessa Lodge, in the US cheerleading comedy-drama TV series Hellcats, played by Sharon Leal
- Vanessa Lutz, in the 1996 US dark comedy crime thriller film Freeway, played by Reese Witherspoon
- Vanessa Lytton, in the UK medical drama TV series Holby City, played by Leslie Ash
- Vanessa Mancini, in the US drama TV series Melrose Place, played by Brooke Burns
- Vanessa Merriman, in the US young adult mystery/suspense novel One of Us Is Lying
- Vanessa Monroe, in the US supernatural teen drama TV series The Vampire Diaries, played by Courtney Ford
- Vanessa Montez, in the US soap opera One Life to Live, played by Jacqueline Hendy
- Vanessa Morita, in the Canadian drama TV series Backstage, played by Devyn Nekoda
- Vanessa Paris, in the 1935 US romantic drama film Vanessa: Her Love Story, played by Helen Hayes
- Vanessa Prentiss, in the US TV soap opera The Young and the Restless, played by K. T. Stevens
- Vanessa Rene, in the Japanese anime TV series Madlax, voiced by Satsuki Yukino (Japanese) and Kelly Manison (English)
- Vanessa Russell, in the US TV sitcom Hangin' with Mr. Cooper, played by Holly Robinson Peete
- Vanessa Stanley, in the supernatural drama TV series Haven, played by Cynthia Preston
- Vanessa Unley, in the Australian TV soap opera Home and Away, played by Sarah Chadwick
- Vanessa Van Helsing, in the fantasy horror drama TV series Van Helsing, played by Kelly Overton
- Vanessa Villante, in the Australian TV soap opera Neighbours, played by Alin Sumarwata
- Vanessa Walsh, in the Japanese anime series Trinity Blood, voiced by Akiko Kimura (Japanese) and Monica Rial (English)
- Vanessa Warfield, in the media franchise M.A.S.K.
- Vanessa Wheeler, in the US superhero drama TV series Heroes, played by Kate Vernon
- Vanessa Woodfield, in the UK TV soap opera Emmerdale, played by Michelle Hardwick
- Vanessa Wye, in the 2020 US novel My Dark Vanessa
- Vanessa Z. Schneider, in the 2003 video game P.N.03, voiced by Jennifer Hale
