= Banesa =

Banesa is a given name.

== People with the given name ==
- Banesa Martinez Roldán (born 1982), Uruguayan-born Swedish politician
- Banesa Oshiro (born 1981), Argentine singer

== See also ==
- Banasa
- Vanessa
