= Megyer =

Megyer may refer to:

- Megyer, Hungary, village in Hungary
- A Hungarian tribe, see Hungarians § Name
- An early name of Békásmegyer, Budapest, Hungary
- An early name of Bábonymegyer, Somogy County, Hungary
- Nagymegyer (Great Megyer), the Hungarian name of Veľký Meder, Slovakia

== See also ==
- Megyeri Bridge, bridge in Budapest
- Magyar (disambiguation)
