= Adam Lloyd =

Adam Lloyd may refer to:

- Murders of Adam Lloyd and Vanessa Arscott
- Adam Lloyd (actor) from Big Ideas (film)
- Adam Lloyd (ice hockey), player on the Oshawa Generals
- Adam Lloyd (racing driver) in the 2009 Commodore Cup National Series
- British crime writer Adam Lloyd, who co-authored Gone Fishing: The Unsolved Crimes of Angus Sinclair with Chris Clark
