= Magar =

Magar may refer to:

- Magar people, of Nepal and India
  - Kham Magar, Northern Magars of Nepal
  - Magar language, their Sino-Tibetan language
    - Magar Kham language, a Tibeto-Burman language of the Kham Magar
- Khagendra Thapa Magar, the shortest man in the world (as of 2012)
- Magar-class amphibious warfare vessel, landing ships of the Indian Navy
- Magar, the Catholicos of All Armenians from 1885 to 1891
- Vanesa Magar Brunner, Mexican and French oceanographer
- Mugger crocodile, a crocodile species in Asia

== See also ==
- Magyar (disambiguation)
- Magaric languages, proposed Sino-Tibetan language subfamily
- Greater Magaric languages, another proposed branch of Sino-Tibetan
