= Vanessa =

Vanessa may refer to:

== Arts and entertainment ==
- Vanessa (Millais painting), an 1868 painting by Pre-Raphaelite artist John Everett Millais
- Vanessa, a 1933 novel by Hugh Walpole
- Vanessa, a 1952 instrumental song written by Bernie Wayne and performed by Hugo Winterhalter
- Vanessa, a song by Grimes and d'Eon from Darkbloom
- Vanessa (opera), a Samuel Barber opera that premiered in 1958
- Vanessa (1977 film), a 1977 West German film featuring Olivia Pascal
- Vanessa (Mexican TV series), 1982 Mexican telenovela starring Lucía Méndez
- Vanessa (British TV series), British talk show presented by Vanessa Feltz
- Vanessa, former name of Canadian television channel Vivid TV

== People ==
- Vanessa (name), a female given name and list of persons named Vanessa
- Esther Vanhomrigh, for whom Jonathan Swift coined the name

== Fictional characters ==
- Vanessa (King of Fighters), a character in SNK Playmore's The King of Fighters video game series
- Vanessa (Symphogear), a character in the anime series Symphogear
- Vanessa (Five Nights at Freddy's), a character in Five Nights at Freddy's video game series
- Vanessa Lewis, in the Japanese video game series Virtua Fighter
- Vanessa Woodfield, in the British television series Emmerdale

== Other ==
- Vanessa (butterfly), a genus of butterflies
- Vanessa, Ontario, a hamlet in Norfolk County, Ontario, Canada
- HMS Vanessa, the name of more than one ship of the British Royal Navy

== See also ==
- Nessa (disambiguation), a shortening of the name Vanessa
- List of storms named Vanessa
