= Magyar =

Magyar may refer to:

- Hungarians
- Hungarian language
- Magyar tribes, fundamental political units of Hungarians between the period of leaving the Ural Mountains and the entrance of the Carpathian Basin
- Magyar (surname), a common Hungarian ethnonymic surname
  - Péter Magyar (born 1981), Prime Minister of Hungary since 2026
- A character from the videogame Brawlhalla
- Robert Brovdi, nicknamed "Magyar" or "Madyar", the Ukrainian drone unit commander of the 414th Strike UAV Brigade ("Birds of Magyar/Madyar")

== See also ==
- Madyar (disambiguation)
- Magar (disambiguation)
- Mugel, a Hun tribe
