= Jonathan Swift =

Anglo-Irish satirist and cleric (1667–1745)

The Very Reverend Jonathan Swift
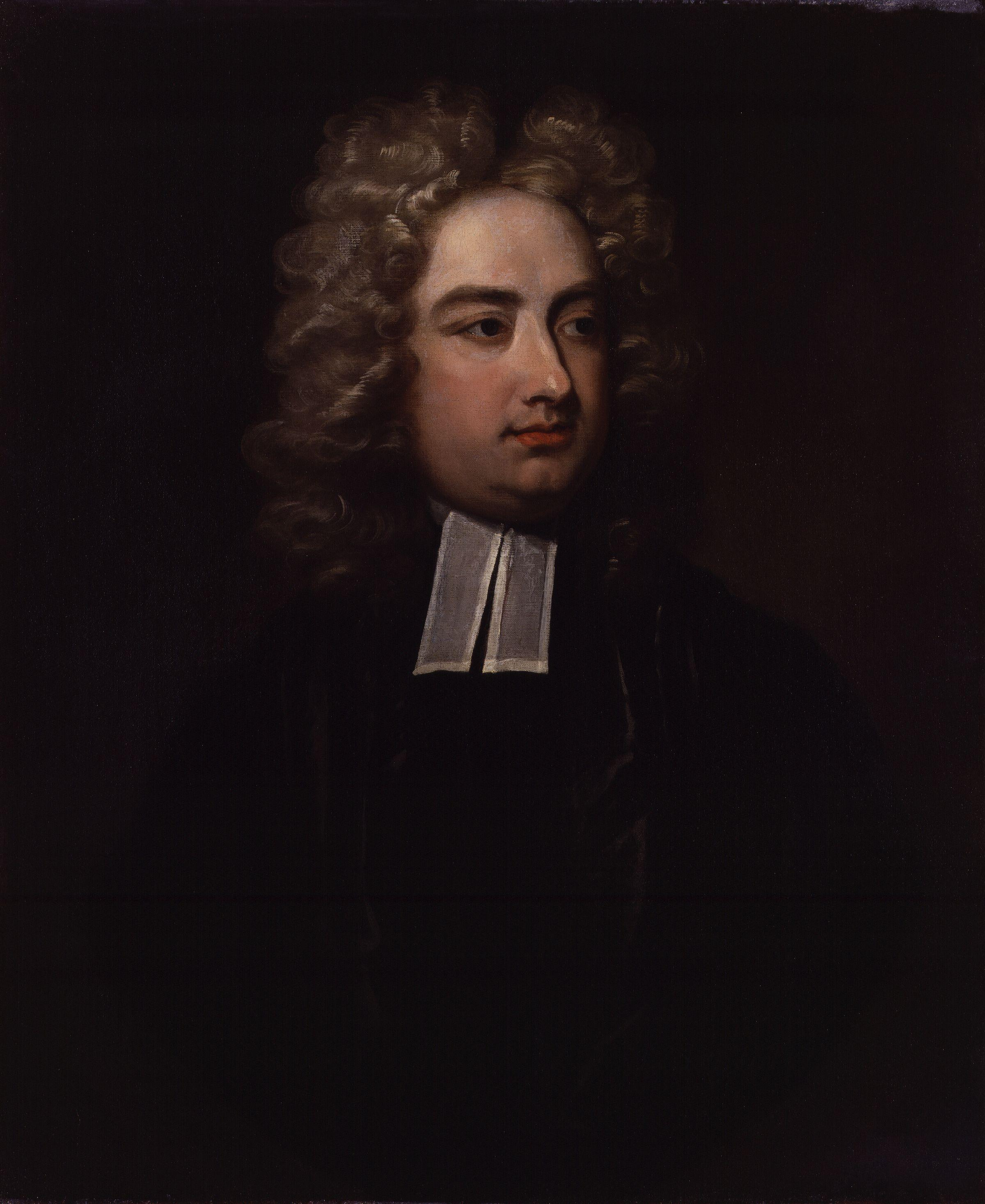
- Portrait by Charles Jervas, 1710
- Born: 30 November 1667; Dublin, Ireland
- Died: 19 October 1745 (aged 77); Dublin, Ireland
- Resting place: St Patrick's Cathedral, Dublin, Ireland
- Education: Trinity College Dublin (BA)
- Occupations: Writer; poet; satirist; political pamphleteer; reverend
- Partner: Esther Johnson (1716–1728)
- Relatives: John Dryden (Cousin); Francis Godwin (Great-Great-Grandfather)
- Writing career
- Pen name: Isaac Bickerstaff; M. B. Drapier; Lemuel Gulliver; Simon Wagstaff; Esq.
- Language: English
- Years active: 1696–1729
- Period: Restoration; Georgian era
- Genres: Satire; parable; polemic; novel; essay; poetry; correspondence; imaginary voyage; other
- Notable works: A Tale of a Tub (1704); An Argument Against Abolishing Christianity (1708); Gulliver's Travels (1726); Cadenus and Vanessa (1726); A Modest Proposal (1729)
- Movements: Classicism; Enlightenment
- Website: Jonathan Swift Foundation

Jonathan Swift (30 November 1667 – 19 October 1745) was an Anglo-Irish writer, essayist, satirist, and Anglican cleric. He was the author of the satirical prose novel Gulliver's Travels (1726) and the creator of the fictional island of Lilliput. He is regarded by many as the greatest satirist of the Georgian era and one of the foremost prose authors in the history of English and world literature.

Swift also authored works such as A Tale of a Tub (1704) and An Argument Against Abolishing Christianity (1708). He originally published all of his works under pseudonyms—including Lemuel Gulliver, Isaac Bickerstaff, M. B. Drapier—or anonymously. He was a master of two styles of satire, the Horatian and Juvenalian styles. In 1713, he was appointed the dean of St Patrick's Cathedral, Dublin, and was given the sobriquet "Dean Swift". His trademark deadpan and ironic style of writing, particularly in later works such as A Modest Proposal (1729), has led to such satire being subsequently termed as "Swiftian". He is also credited with inventing the popular woman's name "Vanessa" through his poem Cadenus and Vanessa (1726).

During the early part of his career, he travelled extensively in Ireland and Great Britain, and these trips helped develop his understanding of human nature and social conditions, which he would later depict in his satirical works. Swift was also very active in clerical circles due to his affiliations to St Patrick's Cathedral in Dublin. He had supported the Glorious Revolution and joined the Whigs party early on. Swift was related to many prominent figures of his time, including John Temple, John Dryden, William Davenant, and Francis Godwin. In 1700, Swift moved to Trim, County Meath, and many of his major works were written during this time. His writings reflected much of his political experiences of the previous decade, especially those with the British government under the Tories. Swift used several pseudonyms to publish his early works, with Isaac Bickerstaff being the most recognisable one. Scholars of his works have also suggested that these pseudonyms might have protected Swift from persecution in the politically sensitive conditions of England and Ireland under which he wrote many of his popular satires.

Since the late 18th century, Swift has emerged as one of the most popular Irish authors globally. His best-known novel Gulliver's Travels, which is one of the most famous classics of English and world literature, has retained its position as the most printed book by an Irish writer in libraries and bookstores worldwide. He continues to be held in high regard in Ireland with many streets, monuments, festivals, and regional tourist attractions named after him. Swift has also influenced several notable authors over the following centuries, including John Ruskin and George Orwell.

== Biography ==
=== Early life ===
Jonathan Swift was born on 30 November 1667 in Dublin in the Kingdom of Ireland. He was the second child and only son of Jonathan Swift and his wife Abigail Erick (or Herrick) of Frisby on the Wreake in Leicestershire. His father was a native of Goodrich, Herefordshire, but he accompanied his brothers to Ireland to seek their fortunes in law after their royalist father's estate was brought to ruin during the English Civil War. His maternal grandfather, James Ericke, was the vicar of Thornton in Leicestershire. In 1634 the vicar was convicted of Puritan practices. Sometime thereafter, Ericke and his family, including his young daughter Abigail, fled to Ireland.

Swift's father joined his elder brother, Godwin, in the practice of law in Ireland. He died in Dublin about seven months before his namesake was born. He died of syphilis, which he said he got from dirty sheets when out of town.

His mother returned to England after his birth, leaving him in the care of his uncle Godwin Swift, a close friend and confidant of Sir John Temple, whose son later employed Swift as his secretary.

At the age of one, child Jonathan was taken by his wet nurse to her hometown of Whitehaven, Cumberland, England. He said that there he learned to read the Bible. His nurse returned him to his mother, still in Ireland, when he was three.

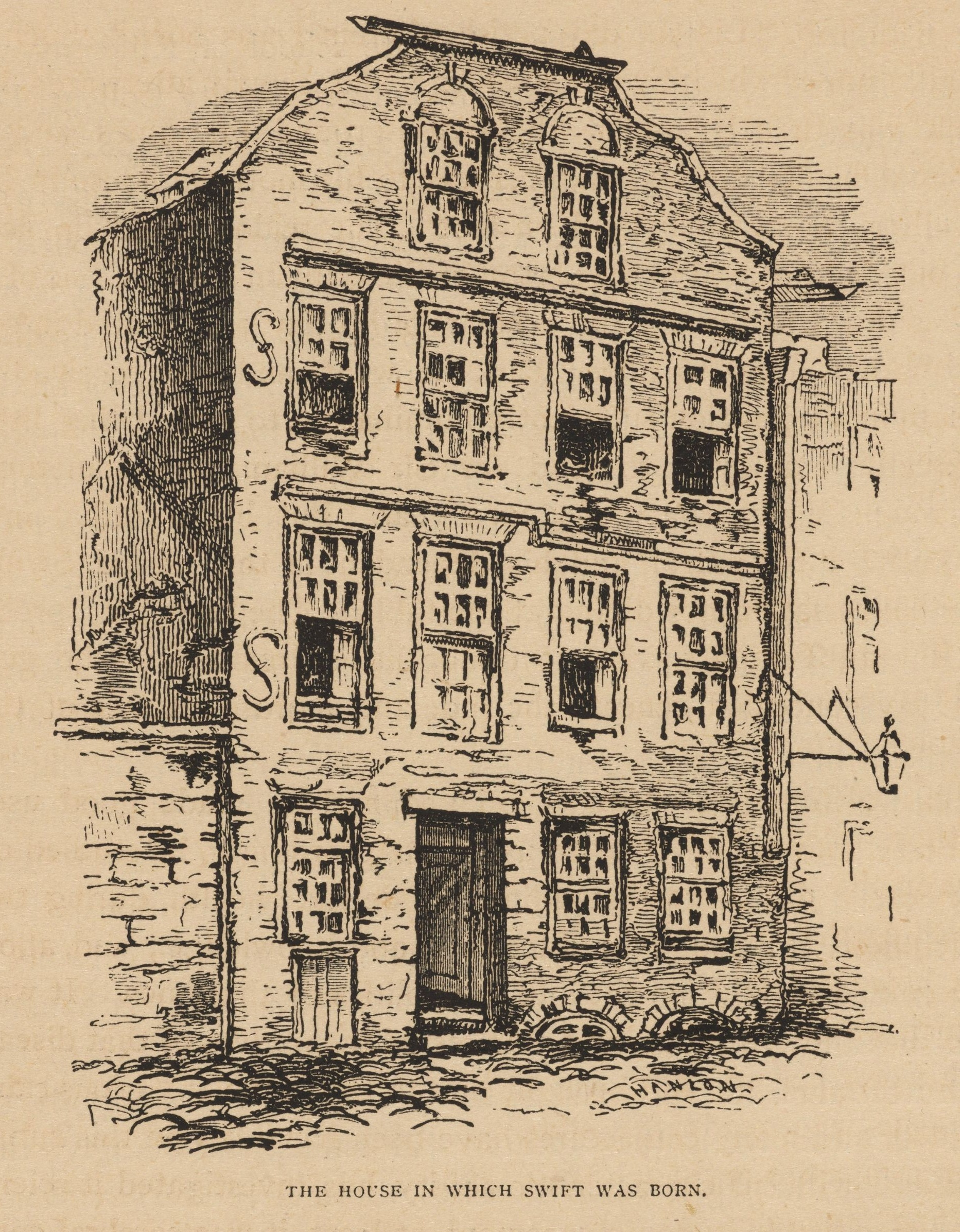
The house in which Swift was born; 1865 illustration

Swift's family had several interesting literary connections. His grandmother Elizabeth (Dryden) Swift was the niece of Sir Erasmus Dryden, grandfather of poet John Dryden. The same grandmother's aunt Katherine (Throckmorton) Dryden was a first cousin of Elizabeth, wife of Sir Walter Raleigh. His great-great-grandmother Margaret (Godwin) Swift was the sister of Francis Godwin, author of The Man in the Moone which influenced parts of Swift's Gulliver's Travels. His uncle Thomas Swift married a daughter of poet and playwright Sir William Davenant, who was rumored to be a godson of William Shakespeare. Swift's benefactor and uncle Godwin Swift took primary responsibility for the young man, sending him with one of his cousins to Kilkenny College (also attended by philosopher George Berkeley). He arrived there at the age of six, where he was expected to have already learned the basic declensions in Latin. He had not and thus began his schooling in a lower form. Swift left the school in 1682, when he was 15.

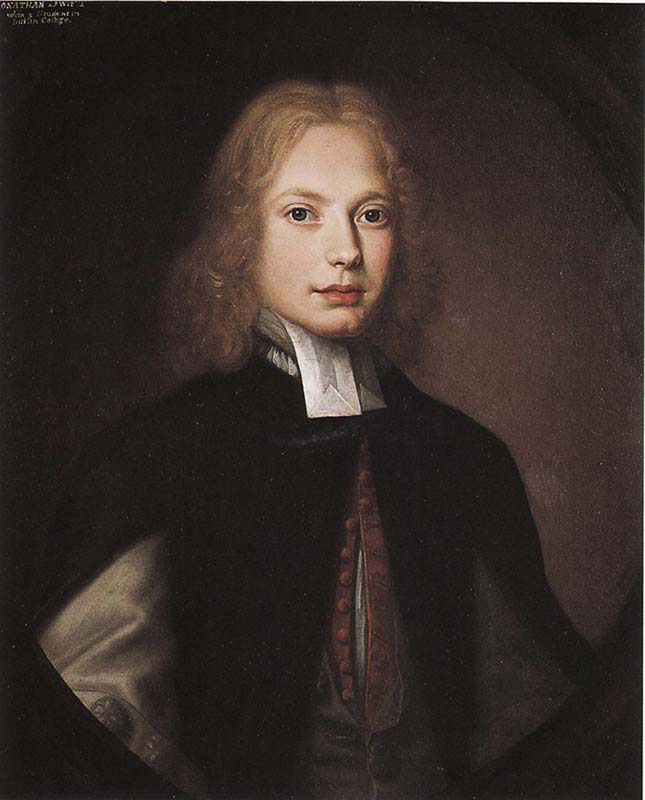
Jonathan Swift in 1682, by Thomas Pooley. The artist had married into the Swift family.

He entered Trinity College Dublin in 1682, financed by Godwin's son Willoughby. The four-year course followed a curriculum largely set in the Middle Ages for the priesthood. The lectures were dominated by Aristotelian logic and philosophy. The basic skill taught to students was debate, and they were expected to be able to argue both sides of any argument or topic. Swift was an above-average student but not exceptional, and received his B.A. in 1686 "by special grace".

=== Adult life ===
Swift was studying for his master's degree when political troubles in Ireland surrounding the Glorious Revolution forced him to leave for England in 1688, where his mother helped him get a position as secretary and personal assistant of Sir William Temple at Moor Park, Farnham. Temple was an English diplomat who had arranged the Triple Alliance of 1668. He had retired from public service to his country estate, to tend his gardens and write his memoirs. Gaining his employer's confidence, Swift "was often trusted with matters of great importance." Within three years of their acquaintance, Temple introduced his secretary to William III and sent him to London to urge the King to consent to a bill for triennial Parliaments.

Swift took up his residence at Moor Park where he met Esther Johnson, then eight years old, the daughter of an impoverished widow who acted as companion to Temple's sister Lady Giffard. Swift was her tutor and mentor, giving her the nickname "Stella", and the two maintained a close but ambiguous relationship for the rest of Esther's life.

In 1690, Swift left Temple for Ireland because of his health, but returned to Moor Park the following year. The illness consisted of fits of vertigo or giddiness, now believed to be Ménière's disease, and it continued to plague him throughout his life. During this second stay with Temple, Swift received his M.A. from Hart Hall, Oxford, in 1692. He then left Moor Park, apparently despairing of gaining a better position through Temple's patronage, in order to become an ordained priest in the Established Church of Ireland. He was appointed to the prebend of Kilroot in the Diocese of Connor in 1694, with his parish located at Kilroot, near Carrickfergus in County Antrim.

Swift appears to have been miserable in his new position, being isolated in a small, remote community far from the centres of power and influence. While at Kilroot, however, he may well have become romantically involved with Jane Waring, who he called "Varina". Waring was the sister of an old college friend. A letter from him survives, offering to remain if she would marry him and promising to leave and never return to Ireland if she refused. She presumably refused, because Swift left his post and returned to England and Temple's service at Moor Park in 1696, remaining there until Temple's death. There he was employed in helping to prepare Temple's memoirs and correspondence for publication. During this time, Swift wrote The Battle of the Books, a satire responding to critics of Temple's Essay upon Ancient and Modern Learning (1690), though Battle was not published until 1704.

Temple died on 27 January 1699. Swift, normally a harsh judge of human nature, said that all that was good and amiable in mankind had died with Temple. He stayed on briefly in England to complete editing Temple's memoirs, and perhaps in the hope that recognition of his work might earn him a suitable position in England. His eventual publication of the third volume of Temple's memoirs, in 1709, made enemies among some of Temple's family and friends, in particular Temple's formidable sister Martha, Lady Giffard, who objected to indiscretions included in the memoirs. Moreover, she noted that Swift had borrowed from her own biography, an accusation that Swift denied. Swift's next move was to approach King William directly, based on his imagined connection through Temple and a belief that he had been promised a position. This failed so miserably that he accepted the lesser post of secretary and chaplain to the Earl of Berkeley, one of the Lords Justice of Ireland. However, when he reached Ireland, he found that the secretaryship had already been given to another, though he soon obtained the living of Laracor, Agher, and Rathbeggan, and the prebend of Dunlavin in St Patrick's Cathedral, Dublin.

Swift ministered to a congregation of about 15 at Laracor, which was just over four and a half miles (7.2 km) from Summerhill, County Meath, and twenty miles (32 km) from Dublin. He had abundant leisure for cultivating his garden, making a canal after the Dutch fashion of Moor Park, planting willows, and rebuilding the vicarage. As chaplain to Lord Berkeley, he spent much of his time in Dublin and travelled to London frequently over the next ten years. In 1701, he anonymously published the political pamphlet A Discourse on the Contests and Dissentions in Athens and Rome.

==== Writer ====
Swift resided in Trim, County Meath, after 1700. He wrote many of his works during this period. In February 1702, Swift received his Doctor of Divinity degree from Trinity College Dublin. That spring he travelled to England and then returned to Ireland in October, accompanied by Esther Johnson—now 20—and his friend Rebecca Dingley, another member of William Temple's household. There is a great mystery and controversy over Swift's relationship with Esther Johnson, nicknamed "Stella". Many, notably his close friend Thomas Sheridan, believed that they were secretly married in 1716; others, like Swift's housekeeper Mrs Brent and Rebecca Dingley, who lived with Stella all through her years in Ireland, dismissed the story as absurd. Yet Swift certainly did not wish her to marry anyone else: in 1704, when their mutual friend William Tisdall informed Swift that he intended to propose to Stella, Swift wrote to him to dissuade him from the idea. Although the tone of the letter was courteous, Swift privately expressed his disgust for Tisdall as an "interloper", and they were estranged for many years. In 1713, Swift was appointed as Dean of St Patrick's Cathedral, Dublin, a position he held until his death.

During his visits to England in these years, Swift published A Tale of a Tub and The Battle of the Books (1704) and began to gain a reputation as a writer. This led to close, lifelong friendships with Alexander Pope, John Gay, and John Arbuthnot, forming the core of the Martinus Scriblerus Club (founded in 1713).

Swift became increasingly active politically in these years. Swift had supported the Glorious Revolution and early in his life belonged to the Whigs. As a member of the Anglican Church, he feared a return of the Catholic monarchy and "Papist" absolutism. From 1707 to 1709 and again in 1710, Swift was in London unsuccessfully urging upon the Whig administration of Lord Godolphin the claims of the Irish clergy to the First-Fruits and Twentieths ("Queen Anne's Bounty"), which brought in about £2,500 a year, already granted to their brethren in England. He found the opposition Tory leadership more sympathetic to his cause, and when they came to power in 1710, he was recruited to support their cause as editor of The Examiner. In 1711, Swift published the political pamphlet The Conduct of the Allies, attacking the Whig government for its inability to end the prolonged war with France. The incoming Tory government conducted secret (and illegal) negotiations with France, resulting in the Treaty of Utrecht (1713) ending the War of the Spanish Succession.

Swift was part of the inner circle of the Tory government, and often acted as mediator between Henry St John (Viscount Bolingbroke), the secretary of state for foreign affairs (1710–1715), and Robert Harley (Earl of Oxford), lord treasurer and prime minister (1711–1714). Swift recorded his experiences and thoughts during this difficult time in a long series of letters to Esther Johnson, collected and published after his death as A Journal to Stella. The animosity between the two Tory leaders eventually led to the dismissal of Harley in 1714. With the death of Queen Anne and the accession of George I that year, the Whigs returned to power, and the Tory leaders were impeached for high crimes and misdemeanors for conducting secret negotiations with France.

Swift has been described by scholars as "a Whig in politics and Tory in religion" and Swift related his own views in similar terms, stating that as "a lover of liberty, I found myself to be what they called a Whig in politics ... But, as to religion, I confessed myself to be an High-Churchman." In his Thoughts on Religion, fearing the intense partisan strife waged over religious belief in seventeenth-century England, Swift wrote that "Every man, as a member of the commonwealth, ought to be content with the possession of his own opinion in private." However, it should be borne in mind that, during Swift's time period, terms like "Whig" and "Tory" both encompassed a wide array of opinions and factions, and neither term aligns with a modern political party or modern political alignments.

Also during these years in London, Swift became acquainted with the Vanhomrigh family, Dutch merchants who had settled in Ireland, then moved to London, and "became involved with" one of the daughters, Esther. Swift furnished Esther with the nickname "Vanessa"—derived by adding "Essa", a pet form of Esther, to the "Van" of her surname, Vanhomrigh—and she features as one of the main characters in his poem Cadenus and Vanessa. The poem became the source for the popular woman's name "Vanessa". This poem and their correspondence suggest that Esther was infatuated with Swift and that he may have reciprocated her affections, only to regret this and then try to break off the relationship. Esther followed Swift to Ireland in 1714 and settled at her old family home, Celbridge Abbey. Their uneasy relationship continued for some years; then there appears to have been a confrontation, possibly involving Esther Johnson. Esther Vanhomrigh died in 1723 at the age of 35, after having destroyed the will she had made in Swift's favour. Another lady with whom he had a close but less intense relationship was Anne Long, a "toast" of the Kit-Cat Club.

==== Final years ====
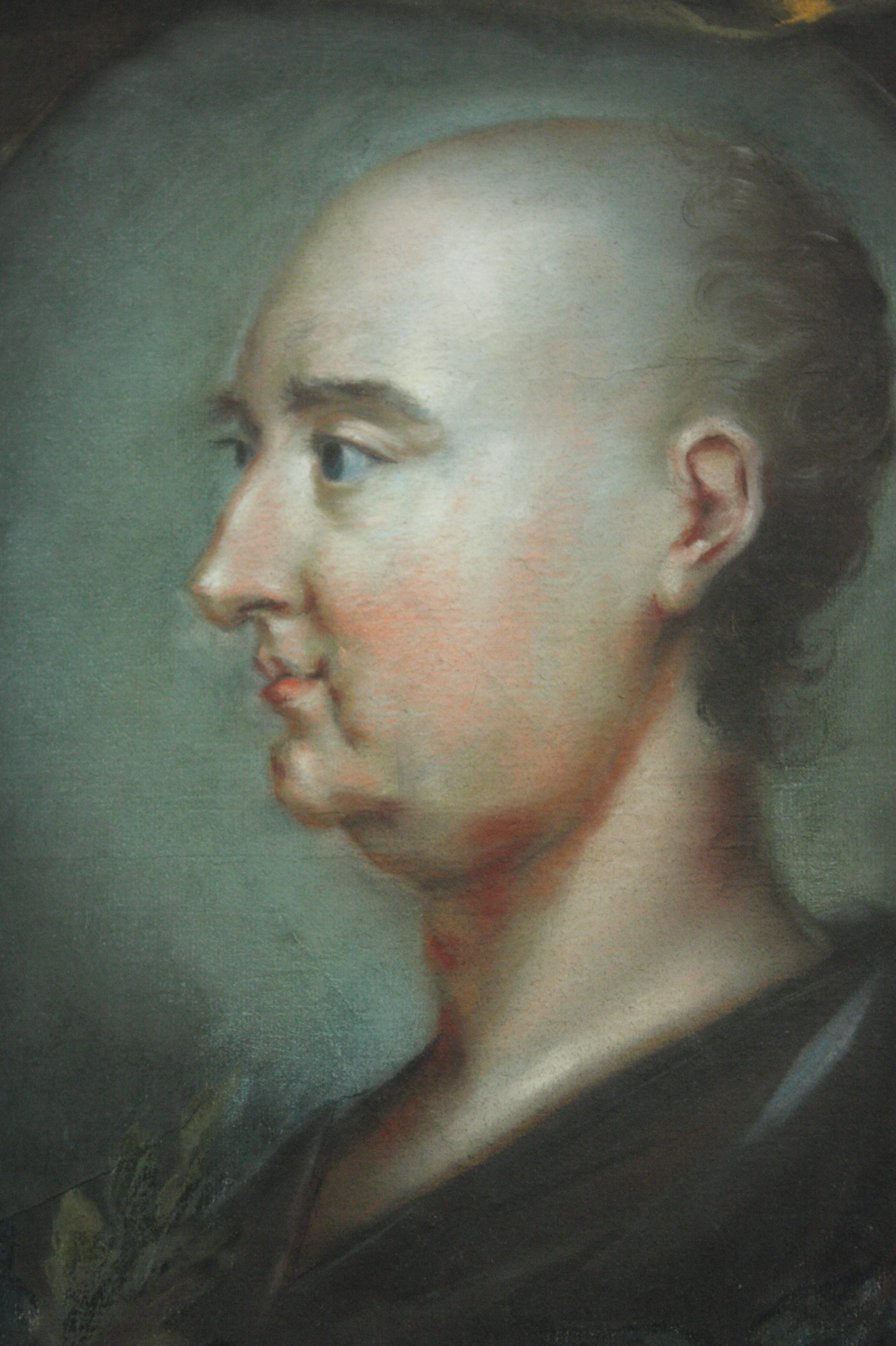
Jonathan Swift (shown without wig) by Rupert Barber, 1745, National Portrait Gallery, London

Before the fall of the Tory government, Swift had hoped that his services would be rewarded with a church appointment in England. However, Queen Anne appeared to have taken a dislike to Swift and thwarted these efforts. Her dislike has been attributed to A Tale of a Tub, which she thought blasphemous, compounded by The Windsor Prophecy, where Swift, with a surprising lack of tact, advised the Queen on which of her bedchamber ladies she should and should not trust. The best position his friends could secure for him was the Deanery of St Patrick's; while this appointment was not in the Queen's gift, Anne, who could be a bitter enemy, made it clear that Swift would not have received the preferment if she could have prevented it. With the return of the Whigs, Swift's best move was to leave England, and he returned to Ireland in disappointment, a virtual exile, to live "like a rat in a hole".

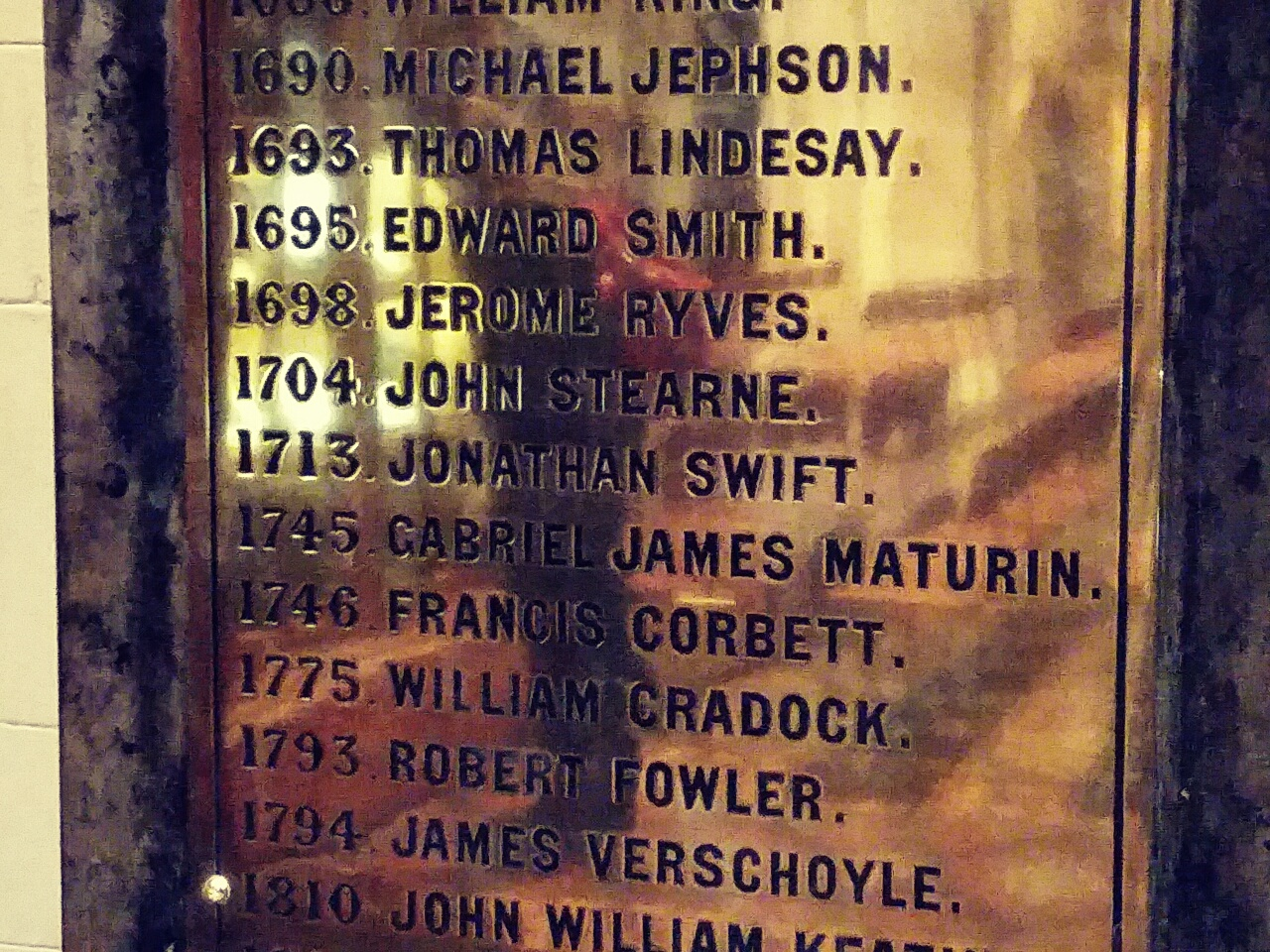
List of deans of Saint Patrick's Cathedral, including Jonathan Swift

Once in Ireland, however, Swift began to turn his pamphleteering skills in support of Irish causes, producing some of his most memorable works: Proposal for Universal Use of Irish Manufacture (1720), Drapier's Letters (1724), and A Modest Proposal (1729), earned him the status of an Irish patriot. This new role was unwelcome to the Government, which made clumsy attempts to silence him. His printer, Edward Waters, was convicted of seditious libel in 1720, but four years later a grand jury refused to find that the Drapier's Letters, which though written under a pseudonym were universally known to be Swift's work, were seditious. Swift responded with an attack on the Irish judiciary almost unparalleled in its ferocity, his principal target being the "vile and profligate villain" William Whitshed, Lord Chief Justice of Ireland.

Also during these years, he began writing his masterpiece, Travels into Several Remote Nations of the World, in Four Parts, by Lemuel Gulliver, first a surgeon, and then a captain of several ships, better known as Gulliver's Travels. Much of the material reflects his political experiences of the preceding decade. For instance, the episode in which the giant Gulliver puts out the Lilliputian palace fire by urinating on it can be seen as a metaphor for the Tories' illegal peace treaty, a treaty he regarded as a good thing accomplished in an unfortunate manner. In 1726 he paid a long-deferred visit to London, taking with him the manuscript of Gulliver's Travels. During his visit, he stayed with his old friends Alexander Pope, John Arbuthnot and John Gay, who helped him arrange for the anonymous publication of his book in November 1726. It was an immediate hit, with a total of three printings that year and another in early 1727. French, German, and Dutch translations appeared in 1727, and pirated copies were printed in Ireland.

In 1727, Swift returned to England one more time and stayed once again with Alexander Pope. The visit was cut short when Swift, receiving word that Esther Johnson was dying, rushed back home to be with her. On 28 January 1728, Johnson died; Swift had prayed at her bedside, even composing prayers for her comfort. Swift could not bear to be present at the end, but on the night of her death he began to write his The Death of Mrs Johnson. He was too ill to attend the funeral at St Patrick's. Many years later, a lock of hair, assumed to be Johnson's, was found in his desk, wrapped in a paper bearing the words, "Only a woman's hair."

===== Death =====
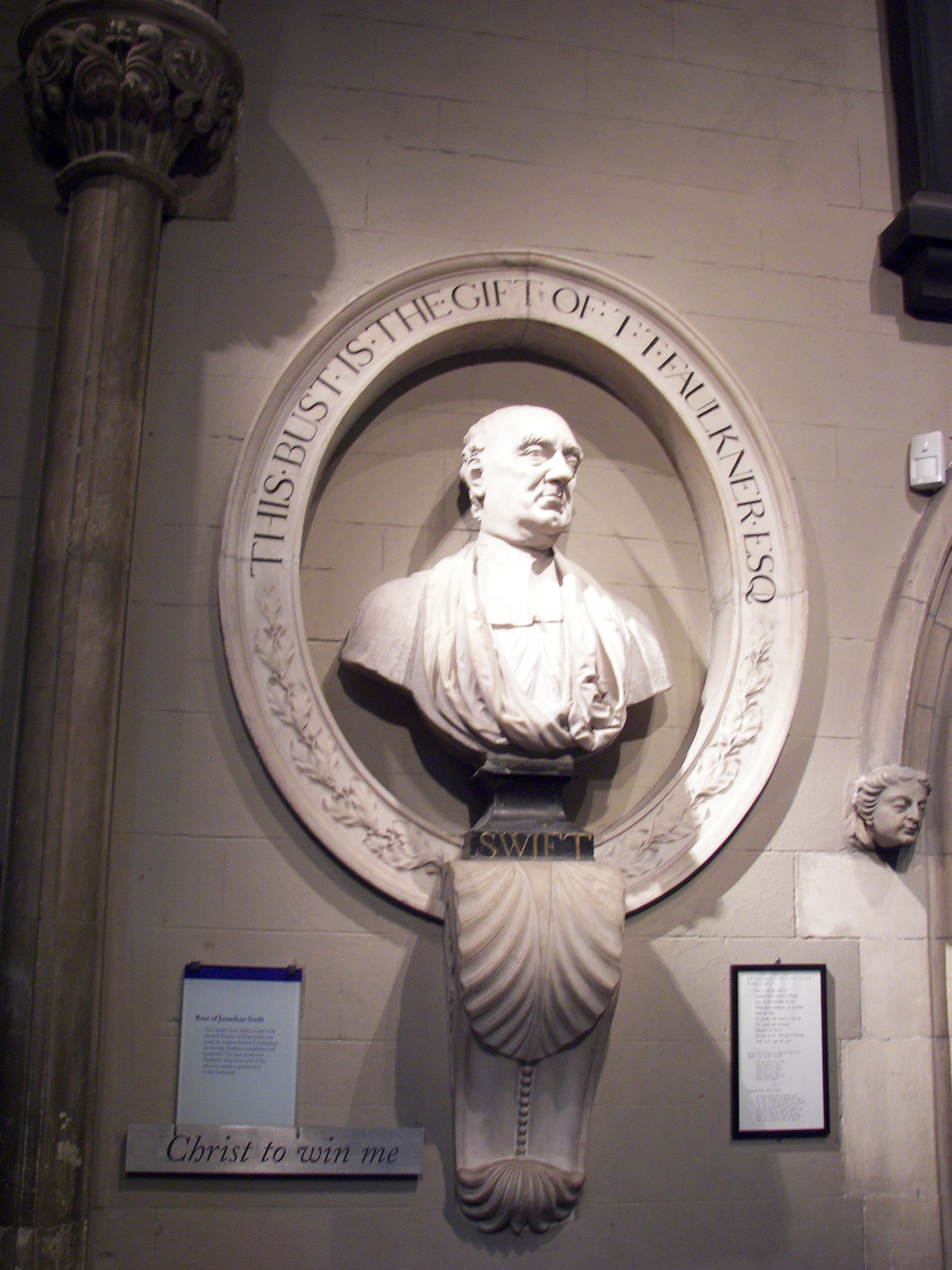
Bust in St Patrick's Cathedral

Death became a persistent preoccupation in Swift's mind from this point. In 1731 he wrote Verses on the Death of Dr. Swift, his own obituary, published in 1739. In 1732, his good friend and collaborator John Gay had died. In 1735, John Arbuthnot, another friend from his days in London, also died, and in 1738 Swift too began to show signs of illness, perhaps even suffering a stroke in 1742, losing the ability to speak and realising his worst fears of becoming mentally disabled. ("I shall be like that tree", he once said. "I shall die at the top.") He became increasingly quarrelsome, and long-standing friendships, like that with Thomas Sheridan, ended without sufficient cause. To protect him from unscrupulous hangers-on, who had begun to prey on the great man, his closest companions had him declared of "unsound mind and memory." However, it was long believed by many that Swift was actually insane at this point. In his book Literature and Western Man, author J. B. Priestley even cites the final chapters of Gulliver's Travels as proof of Swift's approaching "insanity". Bewley attributes his decline to 'terminal dementia'.

In part VIII of his series, The Story of Civilization, Will Durant describes the final years of Swift's life as exhibiting:

Definite symptoms of madness ... [first appearing] in 1738. In 1741, guardians were appointed to take care of his affairs and watch lest in his outbursts of violence, he should do himself harm. In 1742, he suffered great pain from the inflammation of his left eye, which swelled to the size of ... [a chicken's] egg; five attendants had to restrain him from tearing out his eye. He went a whole year without uttering a word.

In 1744, Alexander Pope died. Then on 19 October 1745, Swift died, at nearly 78. After being laid out in public view for the people of Dublin to pay their last respects, he was buried in his own cathedral by Esther Johnson's side, in accordance with his wishes. The bulk of his fortune (£12,000) was left to found a hospital for the mentally ill, originally known as St Patrick's Hospital for Imbeciles, which opened in 1757, and which still exists as a psychiatric hospital.

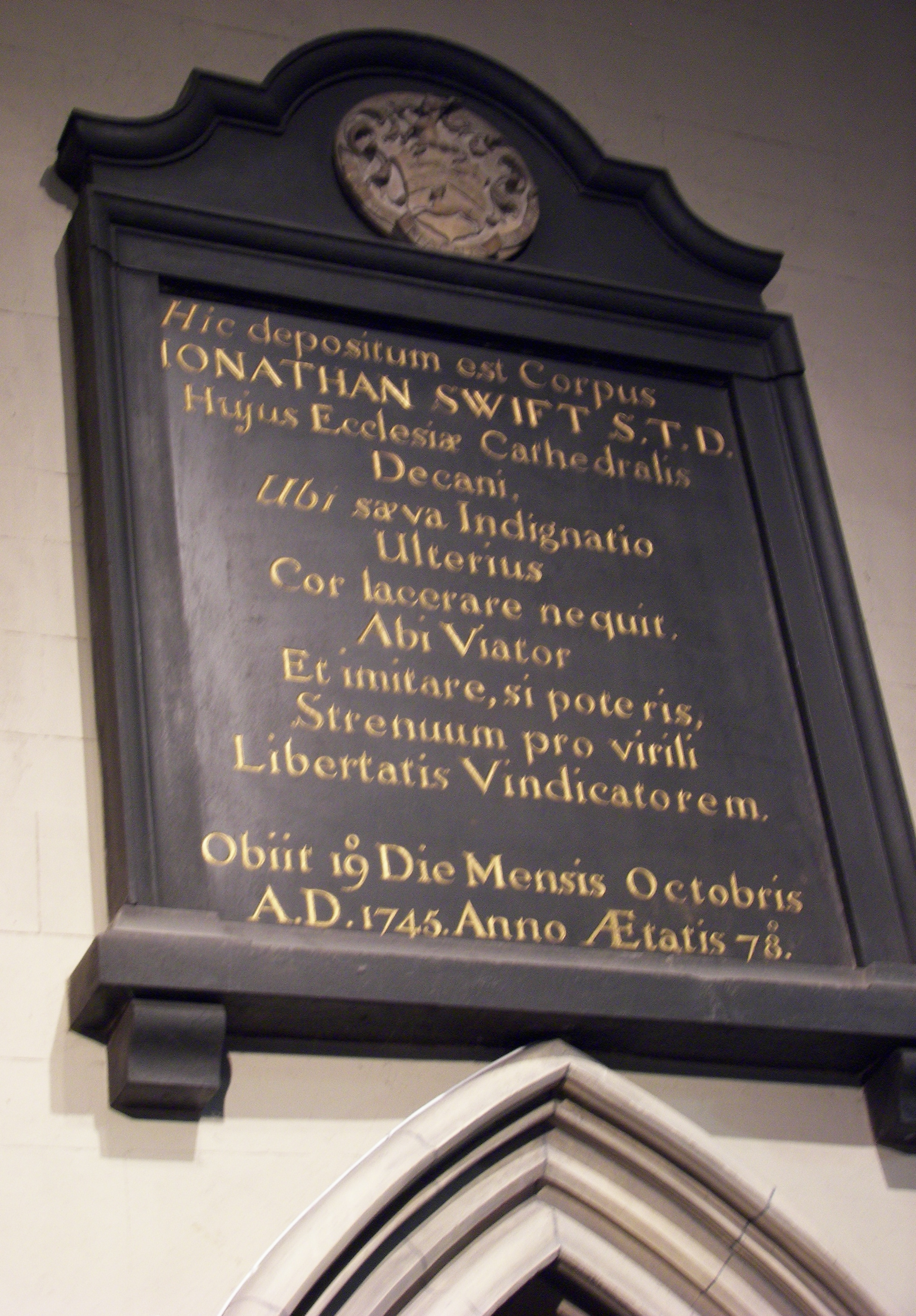
Epitaph in St Patrick's Cathedral, Dublin near his burial site

(Text extracted from the introduction to The Journal to Stella by George A. Aitken and from other sources).

Jonathan Swift wrote his own epitaph:

Hic depositum est Corpus
IONATHAN SWIFT S.T.D.
Hujus Ecclesiæ Cathedralis Decani,

Ubi sæva Indignatio
Ulterius
Cor lacerare nequit.
Abi Viator
Et imitare, si poteris,
Strenuum pro virili
Libertatis Vindicatorem.

Obiit 19º Die Mensis Octobris
A.D. 1745 Anno Ætatis 78º.

Here is laid the Body
of Jonathan Swift, Doctor of Sacred Theology,
Dean of this Cathedral Church,

where fierce Indignation
can no longer
injure the Heart.
Go forth, Voyager,
and copy, if you can,
this vigorous (to the best of his ability)
Champion of Liberty.

He died on the 19th Day of the Month of October,
A.D. 1745, in the 78th Year of his Age.

W. B. Yeats poetically translated it from the Latin as:

Swift has sailed into his rest;
Savage indignation there
Cannot lacerate his breast.
Imitate him if you dare,
World-besotted traveller; he
Served human liberty.

His library is known through sale catalogues.

In his will, Swift requested to be buried "under the pillar next to the Monument of Primate Narcissus Marsh." Swift's disdain for Marsh in life was well-known, leading some to conclude that his epitaph was intended as a satire on Marsh's grandiose sixty-line inscription. Since the renovation of St. Patrick's by Benjamin Guinness in the 1860s, the tombs stand some 50 meters apart, but originally they stood side-by-side. Swift's biographer John Stubbs regards this theory of the epitaph as "completely plausible," but also notes that the inscription stands on its own merits. Leo Damrosch, author of a seminal Swift biography, believes it to be "totally convincing." Both note that this would be consistent with Swift's character.

== Works ==
Swift was a prolific writer. The collection of his prose works (Herbert Davis, ed. Basil Blackwell, 1965–) comprises fourteen volumes. A 1983 edition of his complete poetry (Pat Rodgers, ed. Penguin, 1983) is 953 pages long. One edition of his correspondence (David Woolley, ed. P. Lang, 1999) fills three volumes.

=== Major prose works ===
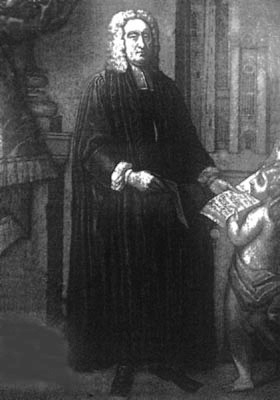
Jonathan Swift at the Deanery of St Patrick's, illus. from 1905 Temple Scott edition of Works

Swift's first major prose/satire work, A Tale of a Tub (1704, 1710), demonstrates many of the themes and stylistic techniques he would employ in his later work. It is at once wildly playful and funny while being pointed and harshly critical of its targets. In its main thread, the Tale recounts the exploits of three sons, representing the main threads of Christianity, who receive a bequest from their father of a coat each, with the added instructions to make no alterations whatsoever. However, the sons soon find that their coats have fallen out of current fashion, and begin to look for loopholes in their father's will that will let them make the needed alterations. As each finds his own means of getting around their father's admonition, they struggle with each other for power and dominance. Inserted into this story, in alternating chapters, the narrator includes a series of whimsical "digressions" on various subjects.

In 1690, Sir William Temple, Swift's patron, published An Essay upon Ancient and Modern Learning a defence of classical writing (see Quarrel of the Ancients and the Moderns), holding up the Epistles of Phalaris as an example. William Wotton responded to Temple with Reflections upon Ancient and Modern Learning (1694), showing that the Epistles were a later forgery. A response by the supporters of the Ancients was then made by Charles Boyle (later the 4th Earl of Orrery and father of Swift's first biographer). A further retort on the Modern side came from Richard Bentley, one of the pre-eminent scholars of the day, in his essay Dissertation upon the Epistles of Phalaris (1699). The final words on the topic belong to Swift in his Battle of the Books (1697, published 1704) in which he makes a humorous defence on behalf of Temple and the cause of the Ancients.

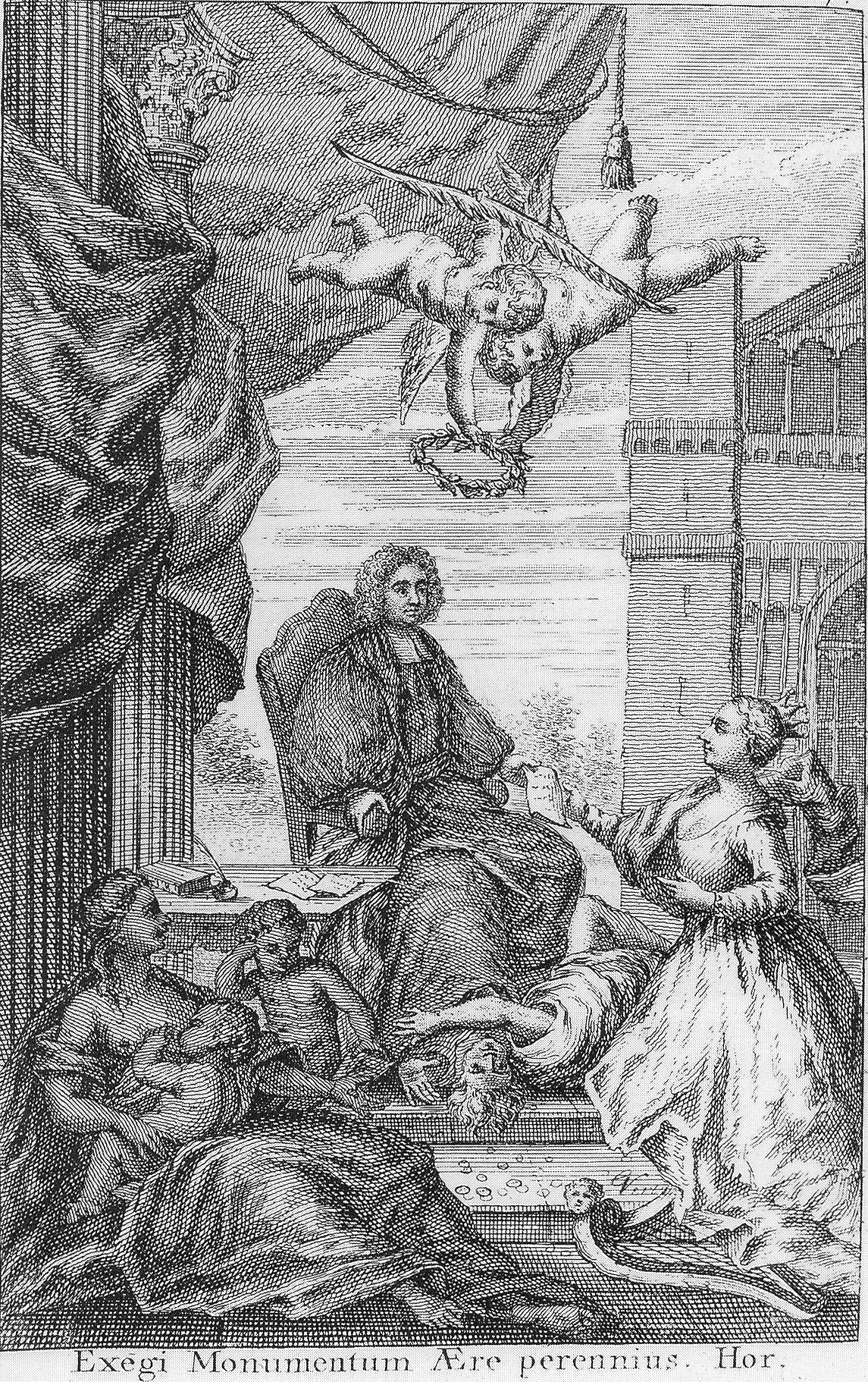
The title page to Swift's 1735 Works, depicting the author in the Dean's chair, receiving the thanks of Ireland. The Horatian motto reads, Exegi Monumentum Ære perennius, "I have completed a monument more lasting than brass." The "brass" is a pun, for William Wood's halfpennies (alloyed with brass) lie scattered at his feet. Cherubim award Swift a poet's laurel.

In 1708, a cobbler named John Partridge published a popular almanac of astrological predictions. Because Partridge falsely determined the deaths of several church officials, Swift attacked Partridge in Predictions for the Ensuing Year by Isaac Bickerstaff, a parody predicting that Partridge would die on 29 March. Swift followed up with a pamphlet issued on 30 March claiming that Partridge had in fact died, which was widely believed despite Partridge's statements to the contrary. According to other sources, Richard Steele used the persona of Isaac Bickerstaff, and was the one who wrote about the "death" of John Partridge and published it in The Spectator, not Jonathan Swift.

The Drapier's Letters (1724) was a series of pamphlets against the monopoly granted by the English government to William Wood to mint copper coinage for Ireland. It was widely believed that Wood would need to flood Ireland with debased coinage in order to make a profit. In these "letters", Swift posed as a shopkeeper or draper to criticise the plan. Swift's writing was so effective in undermining opinion in the project that a reward was offered by the government to anyone disclosing the true identity of the author. Though hardly a secret (on returning to Dublin after one of his trips to England, Swift was greeted with a banner, "Welcome Home, Drapier") no one turned Swift in, although there was an unsuccessful attempt to prosecute the publisher John Harding. General outcry against the coinage caused Wood's patent to be rescinded in September 1725, and the coins were kept out of circulation. In "Verses on the Death of Dr. Swift" (1739) Swift recalled this as one of his best achievements.

Gulliver's Travels, a large portion of which Swift wrote at Woodbrook House in County Laois, was published in 1726 and is regarded as his masterpiece. As with his other writings, the Travels was pseudonymously published under the name of the fictional eponymous character Lemuel Gulliver, who is described in the book's long title as a ship's surgeon and later a sea captain. Some of the correspondence between printer Benjamin Motte and Gulliver's also-fictional cousin negotiating the book's publication has survived. A satire of human nature based on Swift's experience of his times, Gulliver's Travels has often been mistakenly thought of (and published in bowdlerised form) as a children's book, and it has been criticised for its apparent misanthropy. Each of the four books—recounting four voyages to mostly fictional exotic lands—has a different theme. Critics hail the work as a satiric reflection on the shortcomings of Enlightenment thought.

In 1729, Swift's A Modest Proposal for Preventing the Children of Poor People in Ireland Being a Burden on Their Parents or Country, and for Making Them Beneficial to the Publick was published in Dublin by Sarah Harding. It is a satire in which the narrator, with intentionally grotesque arguments, recommends that Ireland's poor escape their poverty by selling their children as food to the rich: "I have been assured by a very knowing American of my acquaintance in London, that a young healthy child well nursed is at a year old a most delicious nourishing and wholesome food ..." Following the satirical form, he introduces the reforms he is actually suggesting by deriding them:

Therefore let no man talk to me of other expedients ... taxing our absentees ... using [nothing] except what is of our own growth and manufacture ... rejecting ... foreign luxury ... introducing a vein of parsimony, prudence and temperance ... learning to love our country ... quitting our animosities and factions ... teaching landlords to have at least one degree of mercy towards their tenants. ... Therefore I repeat, let no man talk to me of these and the like expedients, till he hath at least some glympse of hope, that there will ever be some hearty and sincere attempt to put them into practice.

=== Essays, tracts, pamphlets, periodicals ===
- "A Meditation upon a Broom-stick" (1703–10)
- "A Tritical Essay upon the Faculties of the Mind" (1707–11)
- The Bickerstaff-Partridge Papers (1708–09)
- "An Argument Against Abolishing Christianity" (1708): Full text
- The Intelligencer (with Thomas Sheridan (1719–1788)): Text: Project Gutenberg
- The Examiner (1710): Texts: Project Gutenberg
- "A Proposal for Correcting, Improving and Ascertaining the English Tongue" (1712)
- "On the Conduct of the Allies" (1711)
- "Hints Toward an Essay on Conversation" (1713): Full text: Bartleby.com
- "The Publick Spirit of the Whigs, set forth in their generous encouragement of the author of the crisis" (1714)
- "A Letter to a Young Gentleman, Lately Entered into Holy Orders" (1720)
- "A Letter of Advice to a Young Poet" (1721): Full text: Bartleby.com
- Drapier's Letters (1724, 1725): Full text: Project Gutenberg
- "Bon Mots de Stella" (1726): a curiously irrelevant appendix to "Gulliver's Travels"
- "A Modest Proposal", perhaps the most notable satire in English, suggesting that the Irish should engage in cannibalism. (Written in 1729)
- "An Essay on the Fates of Clergymen"
- "A Treatise on Good Manners and Good Breeding": Full text: Bartleby.com
- "A modest address to the wicked authors of the present age. Particularly the authors of Christianity not founded on argument, and of The resurrection of Jesus considered" (1743–45?)

=== Poems ===
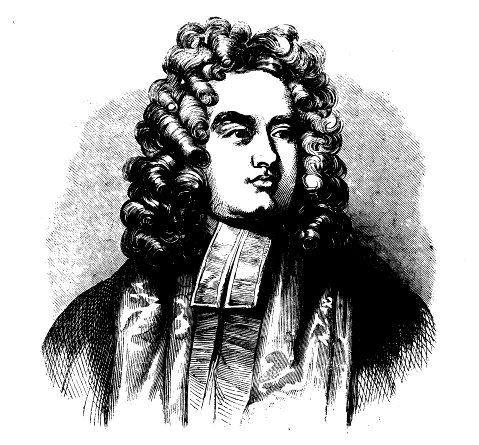
An 1850 illustration of Swift

- "Ode to the Athenian Society", Swift's first publication, printed in The Athenian Mercury in the supplement of Feb 14, 1691.
- Poems of Jonathan Swift, D.D. Texts at Project Gutenberg: Volume One, Volume Two
- "Baucis and Philemon" (1706–09): Full text: Munseys
- "A Description of the Morning" (1709): Full annotated text: U of Toronto; Another text: U of Virginia
- "A Description of a City Shower" (1710): Full text: Poetry Foundation
- "Cadenus and Vanessa" (1713): Full text: Munseys
- "Phillis, or, the Progress of Love" (1719): Full text: theotherpages.org
- Stella's birthday poems:
  - 1719. Full annotated text: U of Toronto
  - 1720. Full text
  - 1727. Full text: U of Toronto
- "The Progress of Beauty" (1719–20): Full text: OurCivilisation.com
- "The Progress of Poetry" (1720): Full text: theotherpages.org
- "A Satirical Elegy on the Death of a Late Famous General" (1722): Full text: U of Toronto
- "To Quilca, a Country House not in Good Repair" (1725): Full text: U of Toronto
- "Advice to the Grub Street Verse-writers" (1726): Full text: U of Toronto
- "The Furniture of a Woman's Mind" (1727)
- "On a Very Old Glass" (1728): Full text: Gosford.co.uk
- "A Pastoral Dialogue" (1729): Full text: Gosford.co.uk
- "The Grand Question debated Whether Hamilton's Bawn should be turned into a Barrack or a Malt House" (1729): Full text: Gosford.co.uk
- "On Stephen Duck, the Thresher and Favourite Poet" (1730): Full text: U of Toronto
- "Death and Daphne" (1730): Full text: OurCivilisation.com
- "The Place of the Damn'd" (1731):
- "A Beautiful Young Nymph Going to Bed" (1731): Full annotated text: Jack Lynch; Another text: U of Virginia
- "Strephon and Chloe" (1731): Full annotated text: Jack Lynch; Another text: U of Virginia
- "Helter Skelter" (1731): Full text: OurCivilisation.com
- "Cassinus and Peter: A Tragical Elegy" (1731): Full annotated text: Jack Lynch
- "The Day of Judgment" (1731): Full text
- "Verses on the Death of Dr. Swift, D.S.P.D." (1731–32): Full annotated texts: Jack Lynch, U of Toronto; Non-annotated text:: U of Virginia
- "An Epistle to a Lady" (1732): Full text: OurCivilisation.com
- "The Beasts' Confession to the Priest" (1732): Full annotated text: U of Toronto
- "The Lady's Dressing Room" (1732): Full annotated text: Jack Lynch
- "On Poetry: A Rhapsody" (1733)
- "The Puppet Show"
- "The Logicians Refuted"

=== Correspondence, personal writings ===
- "When I Come to Be Old" – Swift's resolutions. (1699)
- A Journal to Stella (1710–13): Full text (presented as daily entries): The Journal to Stella; Extracts: OurCivilisation.com;
- Letters:
  - Selected Letters
  - To Oxford and Pope: OurCivilisation.com
- The Correspondence of Jonathan Swift, D.D. Edited by David Woolley. In four volumes, plus index volume. Frankfurt am Main; New York : P. Lang, c. 1999 – c. 2007.

=== Sermons, prayers ===
- Three Sermons and Three Prayers. Full text: U of Adelaide, Project Gutenberg
- Three Sermons: I. on mutual subjection. II. on conscience. III. on the Trinity. Text: Project Gutenberg
- Writings on Religion and the Church. Text at Project Gutenberg: Volume One, Volume Two
- "The First He Wrote Oct. 17, 1727." Full text: Worldwideschool.org
- "The Second Prayer Was Written Nov. 6, 1727." Full text: Worldwideschool.org

=== Miscellany ===
- Directions to Servants (1731): Full text: Jonathon Swift Archive
- A Complete Collection of Genteel and Ingenious Conversation (1738)
- "Thoughts on Various Subjects." Full text: U of Adelaide
- Historical Writings: Project Gutenberg
- Swift quotes at Bartleby: Bartleby.com – 59 quotations, with notes
- The Benefit of Farting Explained, published under the pseudonym Don Fartinando Puff-Indorst, Professor of Bumbast in the University of Crackow.

== Legacy ==
=== Literary ===
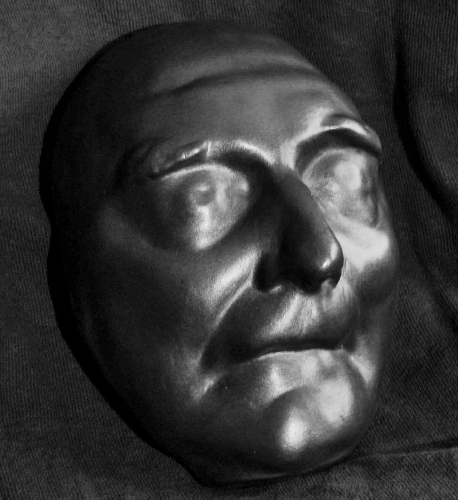
Swift's death mask

Since his death, Swift came to be regarded by many as the greatest satirist of the Georgian era, and among the foremost writers of satire in the English language. Thomas Sheridan called him "a man whose original genius and uncommon talents have raised him, in the general estimation, above all other writers of the age". John Ruskin named him as one of the three people in history who were the most influential for him. George Orwell named him as one of the writers he most admired, despite disagreeing with him on almost every moral and political issue. Modernist poet Edith Sitwell wrote a fictional biography of Swift, titled I Live Under a Black Sun and published in 1937. A. L. Rowse wrote a biography of Swift, essays on his works, and edited the Pan Books edition of Gulliver's Travels.

Literary scholar Frank Stier Goodwin wrote a full biography of Swift: Jonathan Swift – Giant in Chains, issued by Liveright Publishing Corporation, New York (1940).

In 1982, Soviet playwright Grigory Gorin wrote a theatrical fantasy called The House That Swift Built based on the last years of Jonathan Swift's life and episodes of his works. The play was filmed by director Mark Zakharov in the 1984 two-part television movie of the same name. Jake Arnott features him in his 2017 novel The Fatal Tree. A 2017 analysis of library holdings data revealed that Swift is the most popular Irish author, and that Gulliver's Travels is the most widely held work of Irish literature in libraries globally.

The first woman to write a biography of Swift was Sophie Shilleto Smith, who published Dean Swift in 1910.

=== Eponymous places ===
Swift crater, a crater on Mars's moon Deimos, is named after Jonathan Swift, who predicted the existence of the moons of Mars.

In honour of Swift's long-term residence in Trim, there are several monuments, statues and streets in the town. Most notable is Swift's Street, named after him. Trim also held a recurring festival in honour of Swift, called the Trim Swift Festival. In 2020, the festival was cancelled due to the COVID-19 pandemic, and has not been held since.

== See also ==
- List of Irish people
- List of people from Dublin
- Poor Richard's Almanack
- Sweetness and light
