= Cadenus and Vanessa =

1726 poem by Jonathan Swift

"Cadenus and Vanessa" is a poem by Jonathan Swift about one of his lovers, Esther Vanhomrigh (Vanessa), written in 1713 and published as a book in 1726, three years after the death of Vanhomrigh. It contains in its title an anagram and a neologism: Cadenus is an anagram of the Latin decanus, meaning 'dean': Swift was dean of St Patrick's, and known as Dean Swift in the manner of the time. The neologism is Vanessa, in secret reference to Esther Vanhomrigh. The name starts with the first three letters of her surname and the first two of her first name.

With this poem, Swift created the popular woman's name Vanessa.

== See also ==
- Vanessa (name)
- Esther Vanhomrigh
