= An Argument Against Abolishing Christianity =

Satirical essay by Jonathan Swift

An Argument Against Abolishing Christianity (Note: Full title: An Argument to Prove that the Abolishing of Christianity in England May, as Things Now Stand Today, be Attended with Some Inconveniences, and Perhaps not Produce Those Many Good Effects Proposed Thereby.) is a satirical essay by Jonathan Swift defending Christianity, and in particular, Anglicanism, against contemporary assaults by its various opponents, including freethinkers, deists, Antitrinitarians, atheists, Socinians, and other so-called "Dissenters." The essay was written in 1708 and, as was common at the time, was distributed widely as a pamphlet. The essay is known for its sophisticated, multi-layered irony, and is regarded as a prime example of political satire.

== Overview ==
In the essay, Swift answers several real and rhetorical arguments against Christianity. First, he responds to the argument that the abolition of Christianity would expand the liberty of conscience by arguing that if great wits could not denounce the Church, they might instead turn to the denunciation of the government, causing political unrest. Swift then addresses the argument that the Church, then supported by government funds, was a drain on resources that might be better spent elsewhere. Swift responds that if the funds used to support the clergy were used instead to fund freethinking young gentlemen, the money would, in short time, be squandered away on vices, and divided by disagreeable marriages. Next, Swift counters the argument that the abolition of Christianity would open up another day of the week (the Sabbath) to commercial activities for the benefit of the nation by arguing that the Sabbath provides benefits by allowing lawyers time to write their briefs, merchants to tally their books, and others to exercise, go to coffeehouses, and otherwise enjoy themselves, ironically implying that the argument is specious because the Sabbath was not kept as intended in any case. Swift then counters the argument that abolishing Christianity would remove arbitrary sectarian distinctions between Whig and Tory, high church and low church, etc. that arguably damaged civil discourse and politics, by arguing that Christianity merely stands in as a convenient and arbitrary source of such distinctions and that abolishing it would only allow other equally arbitrary distinctions, essentially arguing that the problem is merely semantic and that such distinctions are a part of human nature.

The irony becomes more explicit as Swift next addresses the argument that it is ridiculous to employ a class of people to wail on one day a week against behaviour that is the constant practice of all men alive on the other six by arguing that such vices, including wine and fine silks, were made all the more pleasurable by virtue of their being forbidden by the Christian mores of the era. In response to the argument that the abolition of Christianity would lead to the abolition of all religion, and with it such "grievous prejudices of education" as virtue, honour, conscience and justice, Swift argues that such concepts had already been banished from contemporary education, and that this argument was, therefore, moot. Answering the argument that the abolition of the gospel would benefit the vulgar, and that religion was put in force to keep the "lower part of the world in awe by fear of invisible powers," Swift points out that the vast majority of people were already unbelievers who only employed religion to quiet "peevish" children and provide topics for amusing discussion. Swift addresses the argument that abolishing Christianity will contribute to the uniting of a people divided by various sects by arguing that humanity has an inborn "spirit of opposition" such that if Christianity were not extant to provide a context for such natural oppositions among men, this natural tendency would instead be spent in contravention of the laws and disturbance of the public peace.

Finally, Swift points out potential negative consequences to the abolition of Christianity. First, Swift points out that reformers do not appreciate the advantage to them of having such an easy target upon which to practise their criticism and wit with such little risk to their persons in response as the Church and clergy; and rhetorically asks what institution could adequately replace religion in this role. Next, Swift warns that the abolition of Christianity (specifically the Anglican church) could lead to a rise in Presbyterianism, or worse in his mind, Catholicism. Swift's ironic defence of Christianity becomes more earnest and apparent as he finally proposes that if Christianity were to be abolished, all religion should be so banned, so as to fully free men from all bounds on their thinking and behaviour, in order that they may be allowed to freely engage in such vices as prostitution and drunkenness. In conclusion, Swift proposes that if Christianity is to be abolished, it ought not be done until the conclusion of wars in which England was then involved, as many of the country's allies were devoutly Christian, or at least, in the case of Turkey, religious. In a final ironic flourish, Swift warns that if Christianity were abolished, the stock market would fall, costing Great Britain more than the country had ever spent for Christianity's preservation, and that there would be no reason to lose that much money merely for the sake of destroying the faith.
