= Vanessa Angel =

Vanessa Angel may refer to:

- Vanessa Angel (English actress) (born 1966)
- Vanessa Angel (Indonesian actress) (1993–2021)
