= Vanessa Monaghan =

Irish radio presenter

- Career
- Show: The London Ear
- Station: RTÉ 2XM & RTÉ 2fm
- Style: Disc jockey
- Country: Ireland
- Website: 2xm.rte.ie/category/shows/the-london-ear-nessymon

Vanessa 'Nessy' Monaghan is an Irish radio presenter employed by RTÉ. She presents The London Ear on RTÉ 2XM.

== Personal life ==
Monaghan has documented her experience being an expat from Ireland now relocated in London; including her experience rediscovering the Irish language while encountering a Learn Gaelic programme on the BBC.

== Career ==
Monaghan presents her radio show from her home in London. She currently works for a media company based in the United Kingdom.

=== Blogging ===
In July 2015, Monaghan recorded her "cringe-worthy" experience when a wheelchair user was refused access to a double decker bus because the passenger failed to book a seat in advance of the fare. The incident received exposure and coverage from media outlets nationwide in Ireland.
