= Madyar =

Madyar may refer to:

== People ==
- Lajos Magyar (1891–1940), Hungarian journalist and Sinologist also known as Lyudvig Ignatyevich Madyar
- Robert "Madyar" Brovdi (born 1975), Ukrainian soldier and businessman
- Mojtaba (Madyar) Saminejad (born 1980), Iranian blogger and writer

== Other ==
- Barbastro, a city in Spain once known as "Madyar" under the Umayyad Empire.
