= Vanessa Lee (disambiguation) =

Vanessa Lee (1920-1992) was a British singer and actress.

Vanessa Lee may also refer to:

- Vanessa Lee (archer) (born 1988), Canadian archer
- Vanessa Lee Evigan (born 1981), American actress
- Vanessa Lee Chester (born 1984), American television actress
- Vanessa Lee Carlton (born 1980), American musician
- Vanessa Marie Lee (born 1983), Singaporean netball player
