= Vanessa Wood =

American engineer and professor

Vanessa Claire Wood
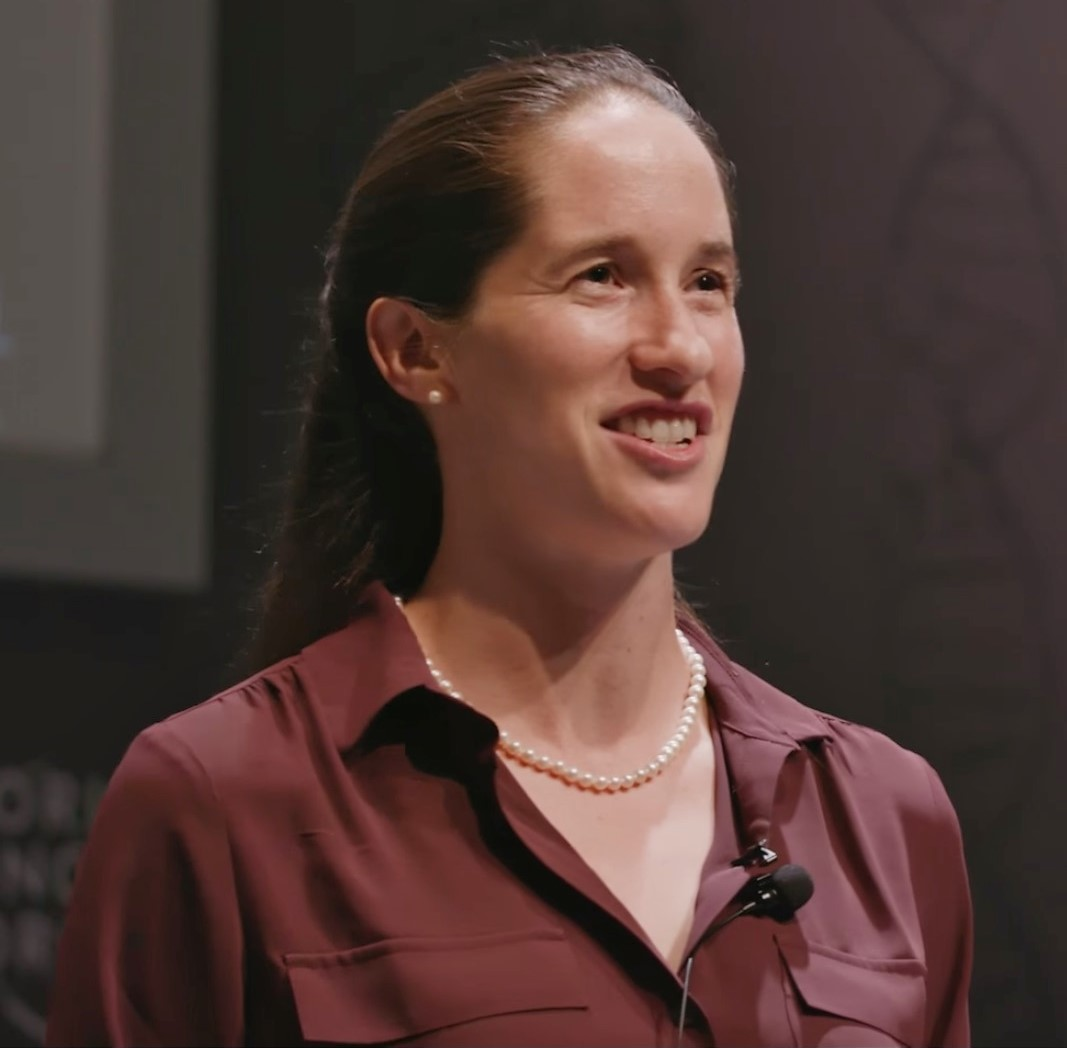
- Wood at the World Economic Forum in 2021
- Born: February 25, 1983 (age 43)
- Education: Yale University; Massachusetts Institute of Technology
- Scientific career
- Workplaces: ETH Zurich; Massachusetts Institute of Technology
- Thesis: Electrical excitation of colloidally synthesized quantum dots in metal oxide structures

Vanessa Claire Wood (born 25 February 1983) is an American engineer who is a professor at the ETH Zurich. She holds a chair in Materials and Device Engineering and serves as Vice President of Knowledge Transfer and Corporate Relations.

== Early life and education ==
Wood earned her bachelor's degree in physics at Yale University. She moved to Massachusetts Institute of Technology for her graduate studies, where she studied electrical engineering. She remained at MIT for graduate research, where she researched the use of metal oxides as transport layers in quantum-dot light-emitting diodes with Vladimir Bulovic. Her research developed strategies to integrate colloidal quantum dots in optoelectronic devices. She created three LEDs where air-stable metal oxides were used to surround the quantum dot active layers. This can improve the shelf-life and luminance of the light-emitting diodes. She also demonstrated the world's first inorganic quantum dot displays incorporating metal oxide charge transport layers. After earning her doctorate, she worked for a short while as a postdoctoral research with Yet-Ming Chiang. She focused on lithium-ion battery flow cells.

== Research and career ==
In 2011, Wood joined the faculty at ETH Zurich. Her research considered lithium-ion batteries, and how electrode microstructure impacts battery efficiency. She created a new analytical method which can be used to monitor battery electrodes during the manufacturing process. She was awarded a European Research Council starting grant to develop quantitative metrologie to guide lithium-ion battery manufacturing. Vanessa wood is a professor at ETH Zurich in Switzerland, where she leads research in materials and device engineering her research focusses on materials and devices such as batteries, solar cells, and leads.

Wood founded the spin-off company Battrion in 2015. Battrion looks to improve charging speed of high energy density lithium ion cells through the development of innovative fabrication strategies. She was made full Professor in 2019.

In 2021, Wood was made the Vice President for Knowledge Transfer and Corporate Relations at ETH Zurich. She was appointed Meeting Chair of the Materials Research Society 2022 Spring Meeting.

== Awards and honors ==
- 2014 BASF Science Prize in Electrochemistry
- 2018 MRS Outstanding Early-Career Investigator Award

== Selected publications ==
- Martin Ebner; Federica Marone; Marco Stampanoni; Vanessa Wood (2013). "Visualization and quantification of electrochemical and mechanical degradation in Li ion batteries". Science. 342 (6159): 716–720. Bibcode:2013Sci...342..716E. doi:10.1126/science.1241882. PMID 24136360. Wikidata Q46202155.
- Vanessa Wood; Vladimir Bulović (2010). "Colloidal quantum dot light-emitting devices". Nano reviews. 1. doi:10.3402/nano.v1i0.5202. PMC 3215219. PMID 22110863. Wikidata Q37960005.
- Mihai Duduta; Bryan Ho; Vanessa C. Wood; Pimpa Limthongkul; Victor E. Brunini; W. Craig Carter; Yet-Ming Chiang (2011). "Semi-Solid Lithium Rechargeable Flow Battery". Advanced Energy Materials. 1 (4): 511–516. doi:10.1002/aenm.201100152. Wikidata Q56618663.
