= Vanessa Gounden =

South African entrepreneur

Vanessa Gounden (born 1961) is an entrepreneur and fashion designer, who first launched her brand Vanessa Gounden in London in 2011. Her business portfolio encompasses mining, financial services, lifestyle, and leisure.

== Career ==
In 2003, Vanessa, alongside her husband Sivi, founded HolGoun Investment Holdings, an investment holding company in South Africa. Starting with minimal resources, they transformed HolGoun into a highly successful multi-divisional company.

HolGoun Investment Holdings primarily invests in coal and uranium but has diversified into various sectors, including mining, exploration, healthcare, financial services, property, and fashion. Vanessa currently serves as the chief executive officer of HolGoun. The group extends its reach through subsidiaries like HolGoun Healthcare, HG Property, and HG Lifestyle and Leisure.

March 2011 marked the launch of her clothing line, Vanessa G London, during London Fashion Week. Hosted at Banqueting House in London, her women's luxury fashion label spans casual, cocktail, formal, and haute couture "ready to wear" clothing.
