= Vanessa Van Edwards =

Author and behavioral investigator

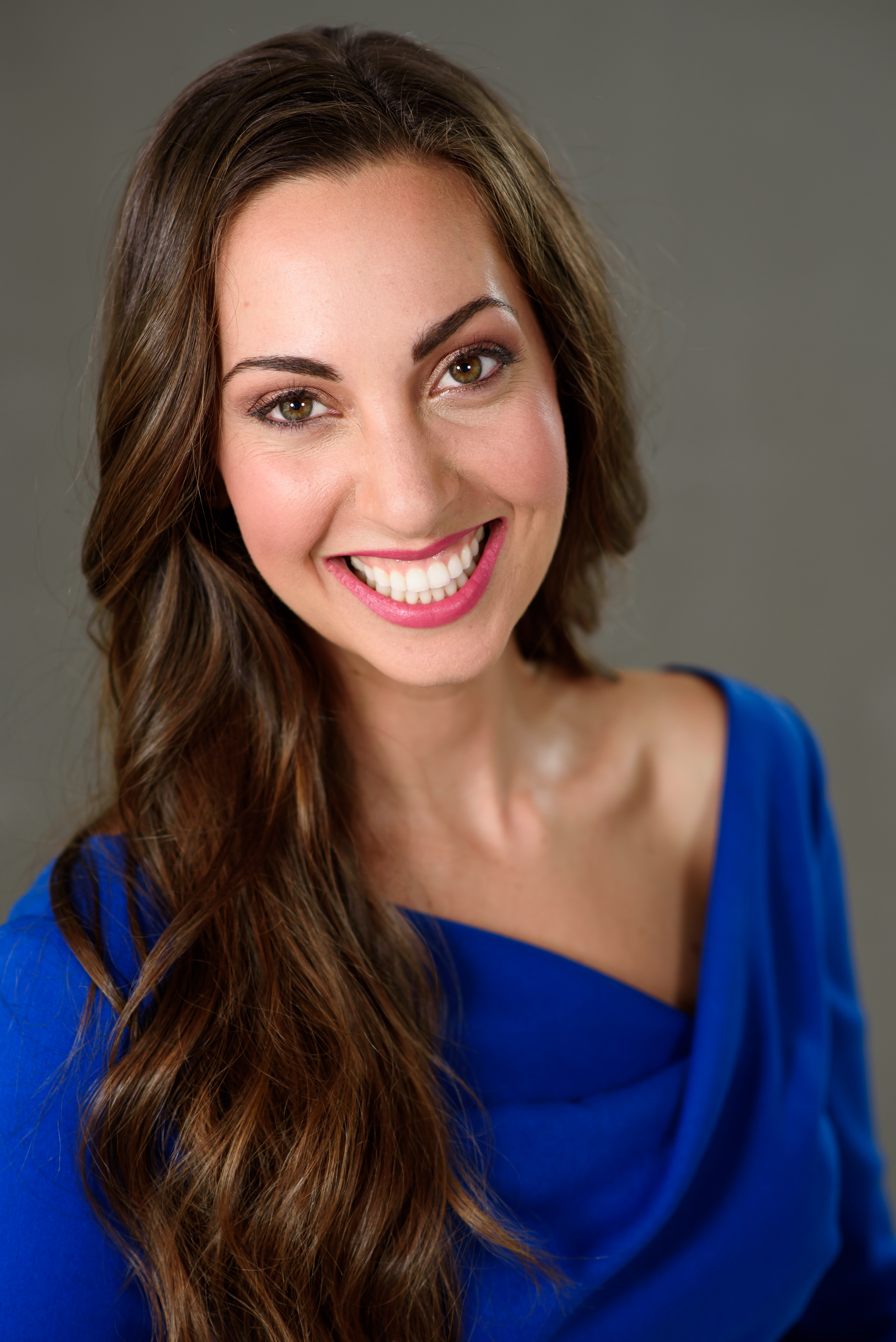
- Van Edwards, 2019
- Born: Vanessa Lynn Van Petten; May 17, 1985 (age 41); Los Angeles, California
- Education: Emory University
- Occupations: Public speaker; author; online instructor
- Years active: 2015–present
- Known for: Founder of Science of People
- Spouse: Scott Van Edwards (m. 2012)
- Children: 2
- Website: scienceofpeople.com

Vanessa Van Edwards (born Vanessa Lynn Van Petten May 17, 1985) is an American author and speaker with Science of People. She specializes in science-based people skills.

== Early life and education ==
Vanessa Van Edwards was born Vanessa Lynn Van Petten on May 17, 1985 in Los Angeles, California. She attended Emory University in Atlanta, Georgia where she studied sociology, Chinese, and international relations.

== Career ==
Van Edwards is lead investigator at her human behavior research lab, the Science of People. She conducts original research experiments on popular psychology and communication.

Van Edwards writes monthly columns for Entrepreneur Magazine and formerly used to for The Huffington Post. She is also a monthly guest on morning news show, AM Northwest. She has written for CNN, TIME, Forbes, and Fast Company.

Van Edwards teaches online courses about body language, facial expression, nonverbal communication and lie detection, all grounded in scientific research. Although lie detection is often associated with body language and facial expressions, research shows that humans perform only slightly above chance when attempting to detect deception. Reviews of the literature have found no reliable nonverbal indicators of deception.

Van Edwards has conducted a set of experiments on TED talks and presented her research at SXSW in March 2015. Her lab conducted research on the TV show Shark Tank and analyzed hand gestures in presidential inaugural addresses.

== Books ==
Van Edwards is the author of the book Captivate: The Science of Succeeding with People (2017).

Her second book Cues: Master the Secret Language of Charismatic Communication released in 2022 and appeared on the bestseller list of The Wall Street Journal.

Van Edwards is the author of the books Human Lie Detection and Body Language 101, Captivate: The Science of Succeeding with People, and Do I Get My Allowance Before or After I'm Grounded with Plume under her maiden name, Vanessa Van Petten. Her book Cues: Master the Secret Language of Charismatic Communication was released in March 2022.

== Personal life ==
Van Edwards married Scott Thornton Edwards in 2012. She lived in Portland, Oregon, with her husband and daughter. She currently resides in Austin, Texas, with her husband and two daughters.
