= Vanessa James (disambiguation) =

Vanessa James (born 1987) is a French pair skater.

Vanessa James may also refer to:

- Vanessa James, a Stargate Universe character
- Sally Beauman (1944–2016), an English journalist and writer, sometimes known as Vanessa James
