= Vanesa Gomez Gonzalez =

Spanish software engineer

Vanesa Gomez-Gonzalez
- Born: Madrid, Spain
- Education: Universidad Politecnica de Madrid (BSc), International Space University (MSc)
- Known for: human exploration on Mars
- Scientific career
- Fields: computer science, space science
- Website: www.vanesagomezgonzalez.com

Vanesa Gomez Gonzalez is a Spanish software engineer who has worked for NASA since 2013. During her NASA career, she has worked at Ames Research Center and the Jet Propulsion Laboratory on projects involving air traffic simulations, quantum computing, robotics, and bioinformatics.

== Education ==
Gomez Gonzalez earned a bachelor's degree in computer science from the Universidad Politecnica de Madrid and a master's degree in space studies from the International Space University in France.

She worked on developing the batch and sequencing process of commands for an academic NASA Mars Rover. She was a MarsWithoutBorders and Mars-X project team member.

== Career ==
Gomez Gonzalez has participated in several space-themed studies, such as undergoing 6G forces in a centrifuge at the National Aerospace Training and Research Center in Southampton, Penn. She also served as a control subject for spatial awareness investigations in connection with space station research.

In 2023, she was a Human Exploration Research Analog (HERA) crew member for a 45 day mission. HERA enables researchers to study how crew members adjust to isolation, confinement, and remote conditions on Earth before NASA sends astronauts on deep-space missions. To help researchers learn about crew behaviors, the crew carries out various science and maintenance tasks inside HERA, such as analyzing rock samples in a glovebox and testing augmented reality capabilities. Crew members also face the challenge of increasing communication delays with mission control as they approach Phobos.

== Personal life ==
Gomez Gonzalez is originally from Madrid. She is a private pilot and a certified rescue scuba diver, and also volunteers at Humane Society and mentors young engineers.
