= Vanessa Erogbogbo =

Ugandan private sector development specialist

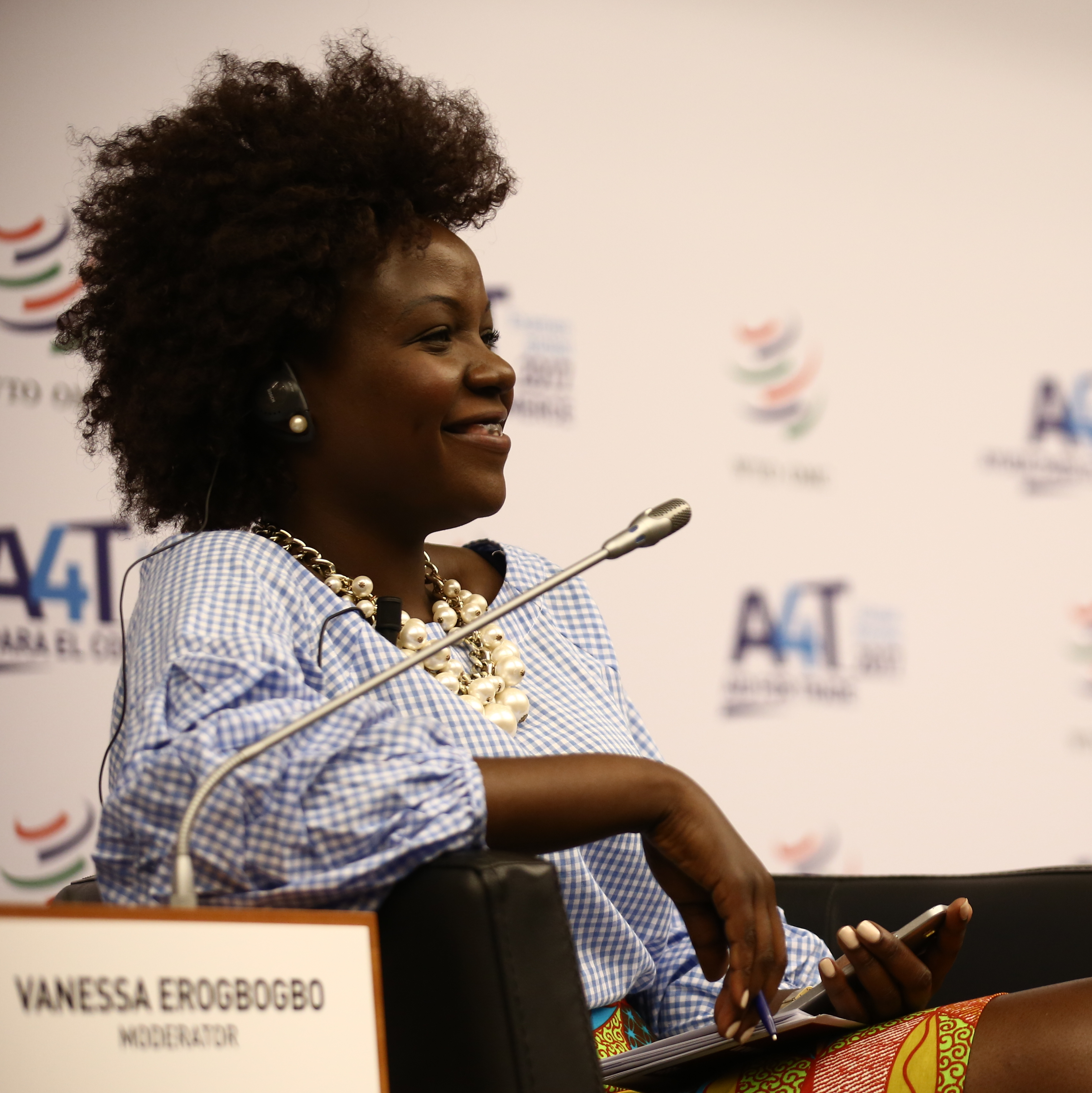
- Born: Kampala, Uganda
- Occupation: Private sector development specialist

Vanessa Erogbogbo is a Ugandan private sector development specialist who focuses on sustainable trade. She is the Director of the Division of Sustainable and Inclusive Trade at the International Trade Centre (ITC).

== Life and education ==
Vanessa Erogbogbo was born in Kampala, Uganda and has lived in several countries. She holds dual citizenship in both Uganda and the United Kingdom. Erogbogbo received an MBA from the London Business School, an MSc Information of Technology from Loughborough University, and a BEng (with Honours) in Civil Engineering also from Loughborough University.

== Career ==
Before her current position at the International Trade Centre (ITC) where she has worked since 2011, she previously worked for the International Finance Corporation, the Standard Chartered Bank, and as an entrepreneur. She currently resides in Geneva, Switzerland where the ITC has its headquarters.

=== Women and trade ===
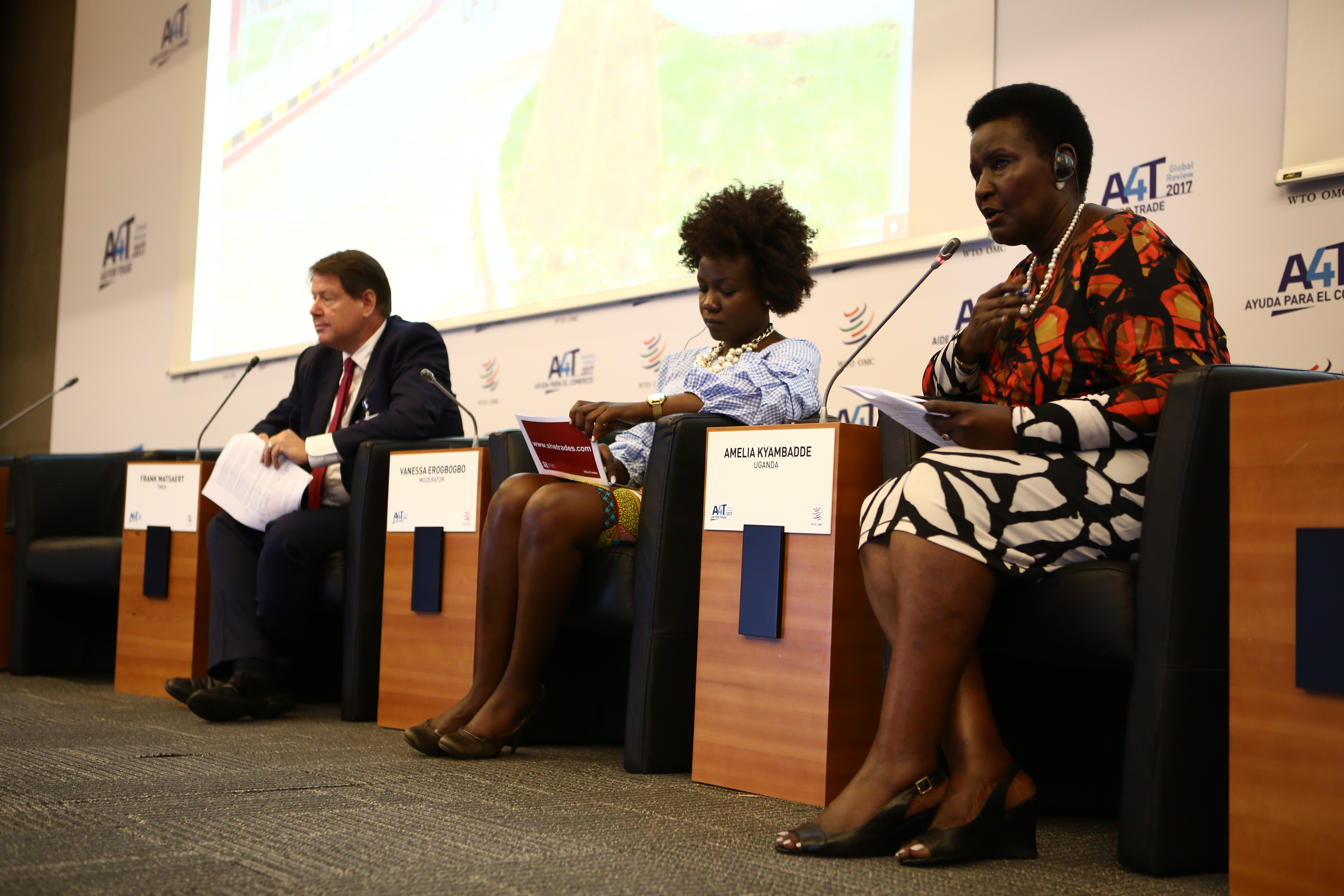
Frank Matsaert, Vanessa Erogbogbo and Minister Amelia Kyambadde at the Aid for Trade Global Review in 2017

The International Trade Centre (ITC)'s mission is to foster inclusive and sustainable economic development through trade and to contribute to achieving the United Nations Global Goals for Sustainable Development. Erogbogbo is the chief of the Green and Inclusive Value Chains Section of the ITC, which is a joint agency of the World Trade Organization (WTO) and the United Nations (UN). The section promotes inclusivity and sustainability in value chains to aid the efforts in creating economic development that is sustainable. A major focus is driving ITC's efforts on environmental sustainability and climate change. Erogbogbo founded #shetrades, an initiative promoting women's economic empowerment through trade, which was launched in 2015.

=== Writing ===
Erogbogbo co-authored, along with Ester Eghobamien and Elizabeth Pimentel, the Gender Responsive Investment Handbook: Addressing Barriers to Financial Access for Women's Enterprise. This work aligns with much of the #shetrades movement Erogbogbo leads. Besides this, she has also written several pieces on the subjects of women and trade.

== Media and conferences ==
Erogbogbo led a talk at TEDx LausanneWomen to introduce some of her favorite success stories in woman-owned businesses and how more can be done to drive this empowerment and lead the future economy.

Erogbogbo has participated in numerous media and speaking engagements, including the WTO public forums that are broadcast on the WTO website. In 2016, Erogbogbo was a panelist with moderators Katherine Hagen and Caitlin Kraft-Buchman with the topic "Women's Economic Empowerment and Trade: Contributing to the Deliberations and Recommendations of the UN Secretary-General's High-Level Panel on Women's Economic Empowerment" all on inclusive trade. When addressing systemic constraints of sustainable development and gender equality as a trade issue, Erogbogbo explained that there is not one singular reason for the supply side constraints, nor one easy solution, but that the transition from development community leading the way of the involvement of the private sector (which is key in resource accessing) is important in providing markets to women. In addition to this, women are already entrepreneurs but they either do not have the opportunities men do, or they do not have the skills to access these opportunities. Erogbogbo supports the leveraging of technology access to women so that women can cross barriers and access markets with less resistance. The following year, Erogbogbo acted as the moderator for the 2017 WTO public forum sessions.
