= Banasa =

Banasa may refer to:

- Iulia Valentia Banasa, a Roman-Berber city in northern Morocco
- Banasa (bug), a shield bug genus in the tribe Pentatomini
