= Vanessa Fernández =

Dominican footballer

Personal information
- Full name: Vanessa Fernández Marte
- Date of birth: 3 February 1993 (age 33)
- Positions: Left winger; attacking midfielder

Team information
- Current team: Las Rozas
- Number: 11

Senior career*
Years	Team	Apps	(Gls)
2013–2014	Las Rozas	26	(2)
2015–2016	Unión Adarve	22	(18)
2016–2017	Las Rozas	8	(0)
2019–	Las Rozas	2	(2)

International career^{‡}
2019–	Dominican Republic	3+	(0)
- * Club domestic league appearances and goals as of 22 September 2019 ‡ National team caps and goals as of 4 October 2019

Vanessa Fernández Marte (born 3 February 1993) is a Dominican footballer who plays as a left winger for Spanish club Las Rozas CF and the Dominican Republic national team.

== International career ==
Fernández has appeared for the Dominican Republic at the 2020 CONCACAF Women's Olympic Qualifying Championship qualification.
