= Vanessa Williams (disambiguation) =

Vanessa Williams (born 1963) is an American actress and singer who was named Miss America in 1984.

Vanessa Williams may also refer to:

- Vanessa Estelle Williams (born 1963), American actress known for her role in the drama series Soul Food
- Vanessa R. Williams (born 1960), American gospel singer
- Vanessa Williams (Sierra Leonean model), Sierra Leonean model and beauty pageant titleholder
