= Vanessa Davis =

Vanessa Davis may refer to:

- Vanessa Davis (actress), Australian actress
- Vanessa Davis (cartoonist) (born 1978), American cartoonist
