= Vanessa Rosales Altamar =

Colombian author

Vanessa Mercedes Rosales Altamar is a Colombian author. She is a renowned feminist fashion critic in Colombia.

Rosales was born in Cartagena. She received her degree as Historian from Universidad de los Andes. She wrote Mujeres Vestidas, a collection of essays, in 2017.

Rosales also wrote Mujer Incómoda, in 2021.
