= Vanessa Heleta =

Vanessa Heleta is a women's rights activist and Special Olympics organiser from Tonga.

Heleta is the founder and Director of the Talitha Project, an organisation which runs a drop-in centre for young women and girls in Tonga, providing security, counselling, training, income generation skills and support. Heleta has also worked to raise the marriage age of girls in Tonga, particularly through the ‘Let Girls be Girls’ campaign.

Heleta is also the National Director of Special Olympics in Tonga. She has led athletes to participate in regional and international sports competitions such as the Asia-Pacific Special Olympics in Australia in 2013 and the World Special Olympics in Los Angeles in 2015, at which Tonga won its first gold medal in an Olympic Games. She has also run Camp Shriver, a camp experience designed by Eunice Shriver, the founder of the Special Olympics movement, in Tonga specifically for young women and girls with disabilities.
