= Murders of Adam Lloyd and Vanessa Arscott =

2004 double murder in Thailand

Vanessa Arscott and Adam Lloyd

The murders of Adam Lloyd and Vanessa Arscott in the Thai town of Kanchanaburi on 9 September 2004, were blamed on Somchai Wisetsingh, a decorated Thai police officer. After confessing, then recanting his story, Wisetsingh was convicted of the crime.

== Background ==
British couple Adam Lloyd (age 25) and Vanessa Arscott (age 24) had been backpacking for two months in Thailand. They were near the end of their holiday and were planning to return home in a few days time. They traveled to the tourist town of Kanchanaburi and were staying at the Sugar Cane guesthouse.

== The murder ==
On 9 September 2004, Lloyd and Arscott were eating a meal at the S & S Restaurant in Kanchanaburi, owned by Mr. Wisetsingh, an off duty policeman when a heated argument ensued. Lloyd and Arscott left the restaurant but were followed by Wisetsingh who shot Mr. Lloyd then chased Ms. Arscott in his car for before running her down and shooting her. Lloyd was shot three times and Arscott twice and both were declared dead at the hospital.

Wisetsingh disappeared immediately after the incident, fleeing from a police manhunt over the border to Burma. He was returned to Thailand on 7 October 2004 by officers of the Karen National Liberation Army. He confessed but later said at trial that he was forced into confessing by police.

== Trial ==
During the trial, Wisetsingh changed his plea to not guilty, and denied the murders, blaming them on a mysterious Mr. Ya, a drug informant who he claimed shot the couple while trying to protect his handler. Wisetsingh indicated he was coerced into previous confessions. He was convicted of both murders and was sentenced to serve two life sentences of 50 years, only escaping the death sentence because of his record as a decorated police officer (he had been Outstanding Policeman of the Year for his district on several occasions) and his initial confession to police. The judge then changed his ruling to one life sentence and one sentence of 33 years and four months.

== Future ==
Lloyds parents have expressed concern that Wisetsingh may not serve his full sentence. They have been advised that prisoners may have their sentences reduced for a variety of reasons, including:

- Good behaviour
- Birthdays of the king and queen
- When the King dies (the elderly King Bhumipo) life sentences are halved
- When a prince is crowned king life sentences are halved
- When an heir is born life sentences are halved

The Bangkok Post reported in 2015 that Wisetsingh has been, "transferred from top security in Bangkok to his hometown prison in Kanchanaburi."
