= Vanesa Oshiro =

Singer

Vanesa Oshiro (大城 バネサ, Ōshiro Banesa; born November 26, 1981) is a Nikkei enka singer born in Buenos Aires, Argentina. She debuted in 2000 at the age of 18.
