= Vanesa Magar Brunner =

Mathematician, Physical Scientist and Entrepreneur

Vanesa Magar
- Born: 4 August 1971 (age 55); Mexico City
- Education: National Autonomous University of Mexico; University of Cambridge
- Scientific career
- Fields: Applied Mathematics; Fluid Dynamics; Oceanography; Meteorology; Renewable Energy
- Workplaces: Ensenada Center for Scientific Research and Higher Education University of Plymouth Bangor University University of Cambridge
- Thesis: Nutrient Uptake by a Self-Propelled Steady Squirmer (2001)
- Doctoral advisor: Tim Pedley

Vanesa Magar (also known as Vanesa Magar Brunner) is a Franco-Mexican scientist who works at the Physical Oceanography Department, Ensenada Center for Scientific Research and Higher Education (CICESE) in Mexico, since 2014. She runs the Geophysical and Environmental Modelling Lab. Her work focuses on wind energy and tidal energy.

== Early life and education ==
Magar was born in 1971 to Roger Magar Vincent (1936- ) and Palmira Brunner Liebshard (1940-2018). She was educated at the Lycée Franco-Mexicain, the National Autonomous University of Mexico (UNAM), at Clare College and Wolfson College, Cambridge University, and at the EPCC, University of Edinburgh.

After taking her Baccalauréat in Physics, Mathematics and Technology (Bac E) at the Lycée Franco-Mexicain in Mexico City in 1989, Magar moved to France and started a General Academic Studies Degree (DEUG) in Physics, Maths, Chemistry, and Technology at the University of Nantes. But, after starting her second year at the University of Orléans, she decided to return to Mexico and started the Physics and Mathematics BSc degrees at the UNAM. While she was a student, Magar was selected by NASA to take part in a space life sciences training programme at Kennedy Space Center, to celebrate International Space Year in 1992. She graduated from UNAM in 1996.

In 1997, she obtained a certificate of Advanced Study in Mathematics from the Department of Applied Mathematics and Theoretical Physics (DAMTP), Cambridge University. She also did her PhD at the DAMTP, working on fluid dynamics with Tim Pedley. Together they studied the uptake of nutrients by swimming microorganisms. She graduated in 2001.

== Professional Trajectory ==
Magar remained at the DAMTP between 2001 and 2002, for postdoctoral studies. She joined Bangor University in 2002, researching the transport of sediment above rippled beds. In 2005, she won a Research Councils UK Fellowship to work at the University of Plymouth., she was then appointed as lecturer in Coastal Engineering in 2010. In 2014, she moved to CICESE, where she was associate professor (2014-2021), then professor (since 2021) at the Physical Oceanography Department.

Between 2023 and 2024 she was a visiting scholar at the EPCC, University of Edinburgh and at the Danish Technical University. Also in 2023, she started an (online, intermittent) MSc in High-Performance Computing and Data Science at EPCC, with the aim to focus on atmosphering modelling for wind energy and weather forecasting applications for the remainder of her scientific career.

She is the author of the book "Sediment Transport and Morphodynamics Modelling in Coasts and Shallow Environments", published by Taylor and Francis Press in 2020 (1st edition). She has authored and co-authored more than 50 publications and refereed abstracts.

== Awards and honors ==
- 2023 - 2024: Visiting Scholar at EPCC, University of Edinburgh.
- 2012 - Fellow of the Software Sustainability Institute
- 2011 - Fellow of the Institute of Mathematics and its Applications (FIMA)
- 2008 - Fellow of The Higher Education Academy (FHEA)
- 2008 - Named a Chartered Mathematician by the Institute of Mathematics and Applications
