= Married at First Sight (Australian TV series) season 13 =

Married at First Sight
- Season 13
- No. of episodes: 39

Release
- Original network: Nine Network
- Original release: 2 February – 13 April 2026

Season chronology
- ← Previous; Season 12

The thirteenth season of Married at First Sight premiered on 2 February 2026 on the Nine Network. Relationship advisors John Aiken and Mel Schilling, alongside sexologist Alessandra Rampolla, all returned to match nine brides and nine grooms. Halfway through the experiment, the experts matched another two brides and two grooms together, as well as two grooms in a same-sex couple.

Following on from issues in past series, with investigations by New South Wales Police Force and Safework NSW, the show will provide a domestic violence support hotline number and the tag line, "Aggressive behaviour is never acceptable". This was Schilling’s last season as a relationship advisor after revealing her cancer had been terminal; she died on 24 March 2026.

== Couple profiles ==
No.	Couple	Age	Home	Occupation	Honeymoon	Final decision	Status
1	Alissa Fay	33	Adelaide, South Australia	Influencer, nurse	Breathtaker Hotel & Spa, Mount Buller, Victoria	No	Separated
1	David Momoh	31	Brisbane, Queensland	Rapper, product manager	Breathtaker Hotel & Spa, Mount Buller, Victoria	No	Separated
2	Rachel Gilmore	35	Melbourne, Victoria	Team leader, recruitment specialist	Evamor Valley, Mudgee, NSW	Yes	Separated
2	Steven Danyluk	34	Sydney, NSW	Marine technician	Evamor Valley, Mudgee, NSW	Yes	Separated
3	Melissa "Mel" Akbay	28	Sydney, NSW	Communications specialist	Rumi on Louth, Louth Island, South Australia	Broke up before final decision	Separated
3	Luke Fourniotis	30	Melbourne, Victoria	Farmer	Rumi on Louth, Louth Island, South Australia	Broke up before final decision	Separated
4	Gianna "Gia" Fleur	35	Melbourne, Victoria	Disability support worker	Ardo Hotel, Townsville, Queensland	Broke up before final decision	Separated
4	Scott McCristal	33	Gold Coast, Queensland	Business owner	Ardo Hotel, Townsville, Queensland	Broke up before final decision	Separated
5	Rebecca "Bec" Zacharia	35	Adelaide, South Australia	Socialite, rental consultant	Yatule Resort & Spa, Natadola, Fiji	No	Separated
5	Daniel "Danny" Hewitt	34	Melbourne, Victoria	Real estate	Yatule Resort & Spa, Natadola, Fiji	No	Separated
6	Brook Crompton	27	Gold Coast, Queensland	Model	The Lane, Hunter Valley, NSW	Broke up before final decision	Separated
6	Christopher "Chris" Nield	31	Melbourne, Victoria	Australian football player, construction supervisor	The Lane, Hunter Valley, NSW	Broke up before final decision	Separated
7	Rebecca Zukowski	51	Melbourne, Victoria	Leasing manager	Daydream Island Resort, Whitsunday Islands, Queensland	Broke up before final decision	Separated
7	Stephen "Steve" Powell	50	Melbourne, Victoria	Hospitality	Daydream Island Resort, Whitsunday Islands, Queensland	Broke up before final decision	Separated
8	Aistė "Stella" Mickunaitė	32	Sydney, NSW	Beauty technician	Freycinet Lodge, Coles Bay, Tasmania	Yes	Separated
8	Filip Gregov	37	Melbourne, Victoria	Influencer, motivational speaker, content creator, carpenter	Freycinet Lodge, Coles Bay, Tasmania	Yes	Separated
9	Julia Vogl	35	Melbourne, Victoria	Former journalist, celebrity interviewer, turned confidence coach	Niramaya Villas & Spa, Port Douglas, North Queensland	Broke up before final decision	Separated
9	Grayson McIvor	34	Gold Coast, Queensland	Recruitment agency owner	Niramaya Villas & Spa, Port Douglas, North Queensland	Broke up before final decision	Separated
10	Juliette Chae	27	Melbourne, Victoria	Receptionist	The Island, Gold Coast, Queensland	Broke up before final decision	Separated
10	Joel Moses	31	Sydney, New South Wales	Model	The Island, Gold Coast, Queensland	Broke up before final decision	Separated
11	Stephanie Marshall	32	Brisbane, Queensland	Real estate agent	Bangalay Luxury Villas, Shoalhaven Heads, NSW	Broke up before final decision	Separated
11	Tyson Gordon	30	Gold Coast, Queensland	Property investor	Bangalay Luxury Villas, Shoalhaven Heads, NSW	Broke up before final decision	Separated
12	Christopher "Chris" Robinson	38	Sydney, New South Wales	Farmer, gym owner	Encore by Mingara, Central Coast, NSW	Broke up before final decision	Separated
12	Samuel "Sam" Stanton	34	Adelaide, South Australia	Fitness studio owner	Encore by Mingara, Central Coast, NSW	Broke up before final decision	Separated

== Commitment ceremony history ==
Episode:	9	13	17	21	25	29	33	37
Ceremony:	1	2	3	4	5	6	7	Final decision
Rachel	Stay	Stay	Stay	Stay	Stay	Stay	Stay	Yes
Steven	Stay	Stay	Stay	Stay	Stay	Stay	Stay	Yes
Stella	Stay	Stay	Stay	Stay	Stay	Stay	Stay	Yes
Filip	Stay	Stay	Stay	Stay	Stay	Stay	Stay	Yes
Bec	Stay	Stay	Stay	Stay	Stay	Stay	Stay	Yes
Danny	Stay	Stay	Stay	Stay	Stay	Stay	Stay	No
Alissa	Stay	Stay	Stay	Stay	Stay	Stay	Stay	No
David	Stay	Stay	Stay	Stay	Stay	Stay	Stay	No
Gia	Stay	Stay	Stay	Stay	Stay	Stay	Stay	Left
Scott	Stay	Stay	Stay	Stay	Stay	Stay	Stay	Left
Chris R	Not in experiment		N/A	Stay	Stay	Leave	Leave	Left
Sam	Not in experiment		N/A	Stay	Stay	Stay	Leave	Left
Juliette	Not in experiment		N/A	Stay	Leave	Left		
Joel	Not in experiment		N/A	Leave	N/A	Left		
Stephanie	Not in experiment		N/A	N/A	Left			
Tyson	Not in experiment		N/A	Leave	Left			
Julia	Stay	Stay	Leave	Left				
Grayson	Stay	Stay	Leave	Left				
Mel	Leave	Stay	Leave	Left				
Luke	Stay	Stay	Leave	Left				
Brook	Stay	Leave	Left					
Chris N	Stay	N/A	Left					
Rebecca	Stay	Leave	Left					
Steve	Stay	Leave	Left					
Notes	none	1	2, 3	4	5	none		6, 7, 8
Left	none	Rebecca & Steve	Mel & Luke	Stephanie & Tyson	Juliette & Joel	none	Chris R & Sam	Gia & Scott
Left	none	Rebecca & Steve	Mel & Luke	Stephanie & Tyson	Juliette & Joel	none	Chris R & Sam	Alissa & David
Left	none	Brook & Chris N	Julia & Grayson	Stephanie & Tyson	Juliette & Joel	none	Chris R & Sam	Bec & Danny

This couple left the experiment outside of commitment ceremony.
This couple elected to leave the experiment during the commitment ceremony.

- ^1: Brook decided to leave the experiment during the commitment ceremony before revealing her decision. Due to this, Chris N also had to leave the experiment.
- ^2: Three new couples were introduced into the experiment.
- ^3: The three new couples were not required to make a decision during the commitment ceremony.
- ^4: Tyson decided to leave the experiment during the commitment ceremony before revealing his decision. Due to this, Stephanie also had to leave the experiment.
- ^5: Juliette decided to leave the experiment during the commitment ceremony before revealing her decision. Due to this, Joel also had to leave the experiment.
- ^6: Scott decided to leave the experiment at the eighth dinner party. Due to this, Gia also had to leave the experiment.
- ^7: David decided to leave at final vows without listening to Alissa. However, Alissa's decision regardless was to leave at final vows.
- ^8: Filip proposed to Stella at their final vows.

== Ratings ==
No.	Title	Air date	Timeslot	National reach viewers	National total viewers	Night rank	Ref(s)
1	Marriages 1 & 2	2 February 2026	Monday 7:30 pm	2,890,000	1,464,000	1	
2	Marriages 3 & 4	3 February 2026	Tuesday 7:30 pm	2,770,000	1,639,000	1	
3	Marriages 5 & 6	4 February 2026	Wednesday 7:30 pm	2,809,000	1,590,000	1	
4	Marriage 7	5 February 2026	Thursday 7:30 pm	2,584,000	1,458,000	1	
5	Marriages 8 & 9	8 February 2026	Sunday 7:00 pm	3,152,000	1,655,000	1	
6	Dinner Party 1	9 February 2026	Monday 7:30 pm	3,099,000	1,784,000	1	
7	Revelations Week Part 1	10 February 2026	Tuesday 7:30 pm	3,084,000	1,731,000	1	
8	Revelations Week Part 2	11 February 2026	Wednesday 7:30 pm	2,937,000	1,635,000	1	
9	Commitment Ceremony 1	15 February 2026	Sunday 7:00 pm	3,287,000	1,973,000	1	
10	Intimacy Week Part 1	16 February 2026	Monday 7:30 pm	3,117,000	1,776,000	1	
11	Intimacy Week Part 2	17 February 2026	Tuesday 7:30 pm	3,023,000	1,820,000	1	
12	Dinner Party 2	18 February 2026	Wednesday 7:30 pm	3,205,000	2,010,000	1	
13	Commitment Ceremony 2	22 February 2026	Sunday 7:00 pm	3,541,000	2,101,000	1	
14	Marriages 10 & 11	23 February 2026	Monday 7:30 pm	3,192,000	1,866,000	1	
15	Marriage 12	24 February 2026	Tuesday 7:30 pm	3,023,000	1,860,000	1	
16	Dinner Party 3	25 February 2026	Wednesday 7:30 pm	3,024,000	2,024,000	1	
17	Commitment Ceremony 3	1 March 2026	Sunday 7:00 pm	3,399,000	2,118,000	1	
18	Family & Friends Week Part 1	2 March 2026	Monday 7:30 pm	2,943,000	1,858,000	1	
19	Family & Friends Week Part 2	3 March 2026	Tuesday 7:30 pm	2,719,000	1,785,000	1	
20	Dinner Party 4	4 March 2026	Wednesday 7:30 pm	2,873,000	1,917,000	1	
21	Commitment Ceremony 4	8 March 2026	Sunday 7:00 pm	3,075,000	1,905,000	1	
22	Couples Retreat Week Part 1	9 March 2026	Monday 7:30 pm	2,831,000	1,933,000	1	
23	Couples Retreat Week Part 2	10 March 2026	Tuesday 7:30 pm	2,816,000	1,856,000	1	
24	Dinner Party 5	11 March 2026	Wednesday 7:30 pm	2,983,000	1,943,000	1	
25	Commitment Ceremony 5	15 March 2026	Sunday 7:00pm	3,136,000	1,965,000	1	
26	Feedback Week Part 1	16 March 2026	Monday 7:30 pm	2,916,000	1,887,000	1	
27	Feedback Week Part 2	17 March 2026	Tuesday 7:30 pm	2,833,000	1,758,000	1	
28	Dinner Party 6	18 March 2026	Wednesday 7:30 pm	2,852,000	1,851,000	1	
29	Commitment Ceremony 6	22 March 2026	Sunday 7:00pm	3,100,000	1,910,000	1	
30	Homestay Part 1	23 March 2026	Monday 7:30 pm	2,786,000	1,776,000	1	
31	Homestay Part 2	24 March 2026	Tuesday 7:30 pm	2,756,000	1,672,000	1	
32	Dinner Party 7	25 March 2026	Wednesday 7:30 pm	2,941,000	1,883,000	1	
33	Commitment Ceremony 7	29 March 2026	Sunday 7:00 pm	3,081,000	1,879,000	1	
34	Final Test Week Part 1	30 March 2026	Monday 7:30 pm	2,983,000	1,821,000	1	
35	Final Test Week Part 2	31 March 2026	Tuesday 7:30 pm	2,876,000	1,900,000	1	
36	Dinner Party 8	6 April 2026	Monday 7:30 pm	2,823,000	1,920,000	1	
37	Final Vows	7 April 2026	Tuesday 7:30 pm	2,927,000	1,804,000	1	
38	Reunion Dinner Party	12 April 2026	Sunday 7:00 pm	3,171,000	1,974,000	1	
39	Reunion Finale	13 April 2026	Monday 7:30 pm	3,041,000	1,954,000	1	
