= Rutene =

Rutene or Rūtene is a surname. It is a Māori translation of lieutenant. Notable people with the name include:

- Awhina Rutene, aged care worker and contestant on Married At First Sight
- Simon Wi Rutene (born 1966), New Zealand alpine skier and politician

== See also ==
- Ruteni
