= Married at First Sight (Australian TV series) season 7 =

Married at First Sight
- Season 7
- No. of episodes: 36

Release
- Original network: Nine Network
- Original release: 3 February – 5 April 2020

Season chronology
- ← Previous; Season 6 Next → Season 8

The seventh season of Married at First Sight premiered on 3 February 2020 on the Nine Network. Relationship experts John Aiken, Mel Schilling and Trisha Stratford all returned from the previous season to match eleven brides and nine grooms. The show cast their first same-sex couple since marriage equality laws were passed in Australia. Halfway through the experiment, the experts matched another two brides and two grooms together, including Elizabeth Sobinoff who previously appeared in season 6.

== Couple profiles ==
No.	Couple	Age	Home	Occupation	Honeymoon	Final Decision	Status
1	Poppy Jennings	38	Wollongong, New South Wales	Photographer	Hunter Valley, New South Wales	Broke up before final decision	Separated
1	Luke Eglin	38	Melbourne, Victoria	Maintenance supervisor (FIFO)	Hunter Valley, New South Wales	Broke up before final decision	Separated
2	Cathy Evans	26	Sydney, New South Wales	Logistics investigator	Daylesford, Victoria	Broke up before final decision	Separated
2	Josh Pihlak	28	Newcastle, New South Wales	Operator/truck driver	Daylesford, Victoria	Broke up before final decision	Separated
3	Amanda Micallef	34	Melbourne, Victoria	Strength coach	Daydream Island, Whitsundays	Broke up before final decision	Separated
3	Tash Herz	31	Adelaide, South Australia	Bartender	Daydream Island, Whitsundays	Broke up before final decision	Separated
4	Natasha Spencer	26	Sydney, New South Wales	Financial analyst	Snowy Mountains, New South Wales	Broke up before final decision	Separated
4	Mikey Pembroke	28	Sydney, New South Wales	Operations manager	Snowy Mountains, New South Wales	Broke up before final decision	Separated
5	Hayley Vernon	32	Melbourne, Victoria	Finance broker	Singapore	Removed from experiment	Separated
5	David Cannon	31	Melbourne, Victoria	Truck driver	Singapore	Removed from experiment	Separated
6	Vanessa Romito	31	Perth, Western Australia	Pharmacy manager	Hervey Bay, Queensland	Broke up before final decision	Separated
6	Chris Nicholls	37	Adelaide, South Australia	Correctional youth worker	Hervey Bay, Queensland	Broke up before final decision	Separated
7	Connie Crayden	27	Melbourne, Victoria	Student	Broome, Western Australia	No	Separated
7	Jonethen Musulin	27	Gold Coast, Queensland	Construction mining (FIFO)	Broome, Western Australia	No	Separated
8	Aleks Marković	26	Perth, Western Australia	Real estate agent	Gold Coast, Queensland	Left experiment, but reconciled	Separated
8	Ivan Sarakula	30	Sydney, New South Wales	Real estate agent	Gold Coast, Queensland	Left experiment, but reconciled	Separated
9	Mishel Karen	48	Brisbane, Queensland	Teacher	Queenstown, New Zealand	No	Separated
9	Steve Burley	52	Melbourne, Victoria	Barber shop owner	Queenstown, New Zealand	No	Separated
10	Stacey Hampton	25	Adelaide, South Australia	Law graduate	Fiji	Yes	Separated
10	Michael Goonan	28	Adelaide, South Australia	Company director	Fiji	Yes	Separated
11	Elizabeth Sobinoff	28	Newcastle, New South Wales	Store manager	Port Macquarie, New South Wales	Yes	Separated
11	Sebastian Guilhaus	31	Adelaide, South Australia	Personal trainer	Port Macquarie, New South Wales	Yes	Separated
12	KC Osborne	31	Cronulla, New South Wales	Professional dancer	Terrigal, New South Wales	Yes	Separated
12	Drew Brauer	31	Cairns, Queensland	Musician/charity founder	Terrigal, New South Wales	Yes	Separated

== Commitment ceremony history ==
Episode:	9	13	17	21	25	28	33/34
Ceremony:	1	2	3	4	5	6	Final Decision
Stacey	Stay	Stay	Leave	Stay	Stay	Stay	Yes
Michael	Stay	Stay	Stay	Stay	Stay	Stay	Yes
Elizabeth	Not in Experiment			Stay	Stay	Stay	Yes
Sebastian	Not in Experiment			Stay	Stay	Stay	Yes
KC	Not in Experiment			Stay	Stay	Stay	Yes
Drew	Not in Experiment			Stay	Stay	Stay	Yes
Mishel	Stay	Leave	Stay	Stay	Stay	Stay	No
Steve	Stay	Stay	Stay	Leave	Stay	Stay	Yes
Connie	Stay	Stay	Leave	Stay	Stay	Stay	No
Jonethen	Stay	Stay	Stay	Leave	Leave	Leave	No
Cathy	Stay	Stay	Stay	Stay	Leave	Left	
Josh	Stay	Stay	Stay	Stay	Leave	Left	
Aleksandra	Stay	Stay	Stay	Stay	Left		
Ivan	Stay	Stay	Stay	Stay	Left		
Hayley	Stay	Stay	Stay	Removed			
David	Stay	Stay	Leave	Removed			
Natasha	Stay	Stay	Leave	Left			
Mikey	Stay	Leave	Leave	Left			
Vanessa	Stay	Stay	Left				
Chris	Stay	Stay	Left				
Amanda	Stay	Leave	Left				
Tash	Stay	Leave	Left				
Poppy	Stay	Left					
Luke	Stay	Left					
Notes	none	1	2, 3	4	5	none	
Removed	none		Hayley & David	none			
Left	none	Poppy & Luke	Vanessa & Chris	none	Aleksandra & Ivan	none	Connie & Jonethen
Left	none	Amanda & Tash	Natasha & Mikey	none	Cathy & Josh	none	Mishel & Steve

This couple left the experiment outside of commitment ceremony.
This couple elected to leave the experiment during the commitment ceremony.
This couple was removed from the experiment by the experts.

- ^1: Poppy left the experiment on her own. Due to this, Luke also had to leave the experiment.
- ^2: Chris left the experiment on his own. Due to this, Vanessa also had to leave the experiment.
- ^3: The experts decided to remove Hayley and David from the experiment after Hayley revealed she wrote 'stay' to keep David in the experiment as revenge.
- ^4: Two new couples were introduced into the experiment.
- ^5: Aleksandra and Ivan left the experiment together before the commitment ceremony.

== Controversy ==
Having discovered that his partner had cheated on him with another groom, David Cannon used wife Hayley Vernon's toothbrush to clean their toilet. The incident caused production to be shut down for a short time while producers dealt with both scandals. At the following commitment ceremony, the experts decided to remove Hayley and David from the experiment due to their toxic behaviour towards each other.

== Ratings ==
No.	Title	Air date	Timeslot	Overnight ratings		Consolidated ratings		Total viewers	Ref(s)
No.	Title	Air date	Timeslot	Viewers	Rank	Viewers	Rank	Total viewers	Ref(s)
1	Episode 1	3 February 2020	Monday 7:30pm	1,154,000	1	139,000	1	1,293,000	
2	Episode 2	4 February 2020	Tuesday 7:30pm	1,067,000	1	124,000	1	1,191,000	
3	Episode 3	5 February 2020	Wednesday 7:30pm	1,014,000	1	144,000	1	1,158,000	
4	Episode 4	6 February 2020	Thursday 7:30pm	992,000	2	174,000	1	1,166,000	
5	Episode 5	9 February 2020	Sunday 7:00pm	1,091,000	1	103,000	1	1,194,000	
6	Episode 6	10 February 2020	Monday 7:30pm	1,140,000	1	102,000	1	1,242,000	
7	Episode 7	11 February 2020	Tuesday 7:30pm	1,109,000	1	132,000	1	1,241,000	
8	Episode 8	12 February 2020	Wednesday 7:30pm	1,178,000	1	152,000	1	1,330,000	
9	Episode 9	16 February 2020	Sunday 7:00pm	1,103,000	1	120,000	1	1,223,000	
10	Episode 10	17 February 2020	Monday 7:30pm	1,091,000	1	136,000	1	1,227,000	
11	Episode 11	18 February 2020	Tuesday 7:30pm	1,005,000	1	112,000	1	1,117,000	
12	Episode 12	19 February 2020	Wednesday 7:30pm	1,058,000	1	147,000	1	1,205,000	
13	Episode 13	23 February 2020	Sunday 7:00pm	1,200,000	1	104,000	1	1,304,000	
14	Episode 14	24 February 2020	Monday 7:30pm	1,027,000	1	116,000	1	1,143,000	
15	Episode 15	25 February 2020	Tuesday 7:30pm	1,020,000	1	135,000	1	1,155,000	
16	Episode 16	26 February 2020	Wednesday 7:30pm	1,128,000	1	175,000	1	1,303,000	
17	Episode 17	1 March 2020	Sunday 7:00pm	1,184,000	1	106,000	1	1,290,000	
18	Episode 18	2 March 2020	Monday 7:30pm	1,087,000	1	113,000	1	1,200,000	
19	Episode 19	3 March 2020	Tuesday 7:30pm	987,000	1	112,000	1	1,099,000	
20	Episode 20	4 March 2020	Wednesday 7:30pm	1,100,000	1	136,000	1	1,236,000	
21	Episode 21	8 March 2020	Sunday 7:00pm	976,000	1	110,000	1	1,086,000	
22	Episode 22	9 March 2020	Monday 7:30pm	1,030,000	1	102,000	1	1,132,000	
23	Episode 23	10 March 2020	Tuesday 7:30pm	950,000	2	112,000	1	1,062,000	
24	Episode 24	11 March 2020	Wednesday 7:30pm	1,047,000	1	137,000	1	1,177,000	
25	Episode 25	15 March 2020	Sunday 7:00pm	1,115,000	1	93,000	1	1,208,000	
26	Episode 26	16 March 2020	Monday 7:30pm	1,046,000	4	94,000	1	1,140,000	
27	Episode 27	17 March 2020	Tuesday 7:30pm	1,070,000	2	92,000	1	1,162,000	
28	Episode 28	18 March 2020	Wednesday 7:30pm	1,077,000	2	104,000	1	1,181,000	
29	Episode 29	22 March 2020	Sunday 7:00pm	1,154,000	3	73,000	3	1,227,000	
30	Episode 30	23 March 2020	Monday 7:30pm	1,124,000	5	88,000	2	1,212,000	
31	Episode 31	24 March 2020	Tuesday 7:30pm	1,075,000	5	67,000	4	1,142,000	
32	Episode 32	25 March 2020	Wednesday 7:30pm	1,206,000	5	107,000	1	1,313,000	
33	Final Vows Part 1	29 March 2020	Sunday 7:00pm	1,161,000	3	63,000	3	1,224,000	
34	Final Vows Part 2	30 March 2020	Monday 7:30pm	1,122,000	5	54,000	5	1,176,000	
35	Reunion Dinner Party	31 March 2020	Tuesday 7:30pm	1,317,000	1	115,000	1	1,432,000	
36	Reunion Finale	5 April 2020	Sunday 7:00pm	1,478,000	1	76,000	1	1,554,000	
