= Married at First Sight (Australian TV series) season 9 =

Married at First Sight
- Season 9
- No. of episodes: 37

Release
- Original network: Nine Network
- Original release: 31 January – 4 April 2022

Season chronology
- ← Previous; Season 8 Next → Season 10

The ninth season of Married at First Sight premiered on 31 January 2022 on the Nine Network. Relationship experts John Aiken and Mel Schilling, along with sexologist Alessandra Rampolla all returned from the previous season to match eight brides and eight grooms. Halfway through the experiment, the experts matched another three brides and three grooms together.

== Couple profiles ==
No.	Couple	Age	Home	Occupation	Honeymoon	Final Decision	Status
1	Selin Mengu	32	Sydney, New South Wales	Executive Assistant	The Holidays Collection, Kavalier Park, Berry, New South Wales	Broke up before final decision	Separated
1	Anthony Cincotta	38	Melbourne, Victoria	Sales	The Holidays Collection, Kavalier Park, Berry, New South Wales	Broke up before final decision	Separated
2	Brent Vitiello	33	Sydney, New South Wales	Hospitality Manager	Shoalhaven, New South Wales	No	Separated
2	Tamara Djordjevic	29	Gold Coast, Queensland	Operations Manager	Shoalhaven, New South Wales	No	Separated
3	Domenica Calarco	28	Sydney, New South Wales	Makeup Artist	Greyleigh, Kiama, New South Wales	Yes	Separated
3	Jack Millar	26	Sydney, New South Wales	Financial Planner	Greyleigh, Kiama, New South Wales	Yes	Separated
4	Ella Ding	27	Melbourne, Victoria	Beautician	Palm Beach, New South Wales	No	Separated
4	Mitch Eynaud	26	Gold Coast, Queensland	Financial Planner	Palm Beach, New South Wales	No	Separated
5	Holly Greenstein	36	Sydney, New South Wales	Cinema Manager	Cedars Mount View, Hunter Valley, New South Wales	Broke up before final decision	Separated
5	Andrew Davis	39	Sydney, New South Wales	Motivational Speaker	Cedars Mount View, Hunter Valley, New South Wales	Broke up before final decision	Separated
6	Selina Chhaur	32	Adelaide, South Australia	Hairdresser	Palm Beach, New South Wales	Yes	Separated
6	Cody Bromley	30	Sydney, New South Wales	Swim Coach/Personal Trainer	Palm Beach, New South Wales	Yes	Separated
7	Olivia Frazer	27	Newcastle, New South Wales	Teaching Student	Arcadia, New South Wales	Yes	Separated
7	Jackson Lonie	30	Melbourne, Victoria	Plumber	Arcadia, New South Wales	Yes	Separated
8	Samantha Moitzi	26	Gold Coast, Queensland	Fashion Brand Manager	Hawkesbury, New South Wales	Broke up before final decision	Separated
8	Al Perkins	25	Sydney, New South Wales	Carpenter	Hawkesbury, New South Wales	Broke up before final decision	Separated
9	Kate Laidlaw	38	Melbourne, Victoria	Clinical Nutritionist	Berry, New South Wales	Broke up before final decision	Separated
9	Matt Ridley	39	Brisbane, Queensland	Law Clerk	Berry, New South Wales	Broke up before final decision	Separated
10	Carolina Santos	33	Sydney, New South Wales	Online Business Owner	Gerringong, New South Wales	Broke up before final decision	Separated
10	Dion Giannarelli	33	Melbourne, Victoria	Property Developer	Gerringong, New South Wales	Broke up before final decision	Separated
11	Jessica Seracino	27	Melbourne, Victoria	Retail Assistant	Kangaroo Valley, New South Wales	Broke up before final decision	Separated
11	Daniel Holmes	30	Brisbane, Queensland	Personal Trainer	Kangaroo Valley, New South Wales	Broke up before final decision	Separated

== Commitment ceremony history ==
Episode:	9	13	17	21	25	29	34/35
Ceremony:	1	2	3	4	5	6	Final Decision
Domenica	Stay	Stay	Stay	Stay	Stay	Stay	Yes
Jack	Stay	Stay	Stay	Stay	Stay	Stay	Yes
Selina	Stay	Stay	Leave	Stay	Stay	Stay	Yes
Cody	Stay	Stay	Stay	Stay	Stay	Stay	Yes
Olivia	Stay	Stay	Stay	Stay	Stay	Stay	Yes
Jackson	Stay	Stay	Stay	Stay	Stay	Stay	Yes
Ella	Stay	Stay	Stay	Stay	Stay	Stay	Yes
Mitch	Stay	Stay	Stay	Stay	Stay	Stay	No
Tamara	Stay	Stay	Stay	Stay	Leave	Stay	No
Brent	Stay	Stay	Stay	Stay	Stay	Stay	No
Samantha	Stay	Stay	Stay	Leave	Leave	Leave	Left
Al	Stay	Stay	Stay	Stay	Stay	Leave	Left
Kate	Not in Experiment		Stay	Leave	Leave	Left	
Matt	Not in Experiment		Stay	Stay	Leave	Left	
Carolina	Not in Experiment		Stay	Leave	N/A	Left	
Dion	Not in Experiment		Stay	Stay	Leave	Left	
Jessica	Not in Experiment		Leave	Left			
Daniel	Not in Experiment		Stay	Left			
Selin	Stay	Stay	Leave	Left			
Anthony	Stay	Stay	Leave	Left			
Holly	Stay	Left					
Andrew	Stay	Left					
Notes	none	1	2	3	4, 5	none	6
Left	none	Holly & Andrew	Selin & Anthony	Jessica & Daniel	Kate & Matt	Sam & Al	Tamara & Brent
Left	none	Holly & Andrew	Selin & Anthony	Jessica & Daniel	Carolina & Dion	Sam & Al	Ella & Mitch

This couple left the experiment outside of commitment ceremony.
This couple elected to leave the experiment during the commitment ceremony.

- ^1: Andrew left the experiment on his own. Due to this, Holly also had to leave the experiment.
- ^2: Three new couples were introduced into the experiment.
- ^3: Jessica left the experiment on her own. Due to this, Daniel also had to leave the experiment.
- ^4: Dion attended the commitment ceremony by himself and wrote 'leave'.
- ^5: Carolina and Daniel tried to enter the commitment ceremony as a couple, but the experts rejected their request.
- ^6: Mitch needed more time at final vows to make a decision about his relationship with Ella. They were in a relationship at the reunion.

== Controversy ==
During filming, contestant Simon Blackburn was removed from the show after homophobic and misogynistic videos of him surfaced on social media. All scenes that featured Blackburn were edited out of the series following his dismissal.

A petition, signed by over 120,000 fans, called for the E-Safety Commission to look into the behaviour of Olivia Frazer after she shared around a nude photo of fellow bride Domenica Calarco without Domenica's knowledge or consent. In March 2022, the New South Wales Police Force confirmed reports they were investigating an incident involving glass smashing at the couples retreat, as well as the distribution of an image without consent.

== Ratings ==
No.	Title	Air date	Timeslot	Overnight ratings		Consolidated ratings		Total viewers	Ref(s)
No.	Title	Air date	Timeslot	Viewers	Rank	Viewers	Rank	Total viewers	Ref(s)
1	Episode 1	31 January 2022	Monday 7:30pm	869,000	5	136,000	1	1,005,000	
2	Episode 2	1 February 2022	Tuesday 7:30pm	862,000	4	124,000	1	986,000	
3	Episode 3	2 February 2022	Wednesday 7:30pm	808,000	5	118,000	1	926,000	
4	Episode 4	3 February 2022	Thursday 7:30pm	752,000	5	187,000	1	939,000	
5	Episode 5	6 February 2022	Sunday 7:00pm	825,000	3	93,000	1	918,000	
6	Episode 6	7 February 2022	Monday 7:30pm	982,000	3	111,000	1	1,093,000	
7	Episode 7	8 February 2022	Tuesday 7:30pm	913,000	2	106,000	1	1,019,000	
8	Episode 8	9 February 2022	Wednesday 7:30pm	868,000	3	113,000	1	981,000	
9	Episode 9	13 February 2022	Sunday 7:00pm	961,000	2	90,000	1	1,051,000	
10	Episode 10	14 February 2022	Monday 7:30pm	837,000	3	91,000	1	928,000	
11	Episode 11	15 February 2022	Tuesday 7:30pm	827,000	3	93,000	1	920,000	
12	Episode 12	16 February 2022	Wednesday 7:30pm	922,000	2	105,000	1	1,027,000	
13	Episode 13	20 February 2022	Sunday 7:00pm	926,000	1	91,000	1	1,017,000	
14	Episode 14	21 February 2022	Monday 7:30pm	823,000	5	82,000	1	905,000	
15	Episode 15	22 February 2022	Tuesday 7:30pm	845,000	3	80,000	1	925,000	
16	Episode 16	23 February 2022	Wednesday 7:30pm	908,000	2	98,000	1	1,006,000	
17	Episode 17	27 February 2022	Sunday 7:00pm	1,007,000	3	111,000	1	1,118,000	
18	Episode 18	28 February 2022	Monday 7:30pm	940,000	5	128,000	1	1,068,000	
19	Episode 19	1 March 2022	Tuesday 7:30pm	889,000	5	129,000	1	1,018,000	
20	Episode 20	2 March 2022	Wednesday 7:30pm	967,000	5	151,000	1	1,118,000	
21	Episode 21	6 March 2022	Sunday 7:30pm	968,000	2	86,000	1	1,054,000	
22	Episode 22	7 March 2022	Monday 7:30pm	978,000	5	93,000	1	1,071,000	
23	Episode 23	8 March 2022	Tuesday 7:30pm	1,028,000	1	89,000	1	1,117,000	
24	Episode 24	9 March 2022	Wednesday 7:30pm	1,015,000	1	98,000	1	1,113,000	
25	Episode 25	13 March 2022	Sunday 7:00pm	1,076,000	1	70,000	1	1,146,000	
26	Episode 26	14 March 2022	Monday 7:30pm	977,000	2	68,000	1	1,045,000	
27	Episode 27	15 March 2022	Tuesday 7:30pm	925,000	1	86,000	1	1,011,000	
28	Episode 28	16 March 2022	Wednesday 7:30pm	930,000	1	106,000	1	1,036,000	
29	Episode 29	20 March 2022	Sunday 7:00pm	1,063,000	1	67,000	1	1,130,000	
30	Episode 30	21 March 2022	Monday 7:30pm	942,000	2	79,000	1	1,021,000	
31	Episode 31	22 March 2022	Tuesday 7:30pm	939,000	1	77,000	1	1,016,000	
32	Episode 32	23 March 2022	Wednesday 7:30pm	954,000	1	118,000	1	1,072,000	
33	Episode 33	27 March 2022	Sunday 7:00pm	1,113,000	1	66,000	1	1,179,000	
34	Final Vows Part 1	28 March 2022	Monday 7:30pm	997,000	3	73,000	1	1,070,000	
35	Final Vows Part 2	29 March 2022	Tuesday 7:30pm	1,008,000	1	87,000	1	1,095,000	
36	Reunion Dinner Party	3 April 2022	Sunday 7:00pm	1,140,000	1	78,000	1	1,218,000	
37	Reunion Finale	4 April 2022	Monday 7:30pm	1,207,000	1	108,000	1	1,315,000	
