= Married at First Sight (Australian TV series) season 11 =

Married at First Sight
- Season 11
- No. of episodes: 38

Release
- Original network: Nine Network
- Original release: 29 January – 8 April 2024

Season chronology
- ← Previous; Season 10 Next → Season 12

The eleventh season of Married at First Sight premiered on 29 January 2024 on the Nine Network. Relationship experts John Aiken and Mel Schilling, alongside sexologist Alessandra Rampolla, all returned to match nine brides and nine grooms. Halfway through the experiment, the experts matched another two brides and two grooms together, as well as two grooms in a same-sex couple.

== Couple profiles ==
No.	Couple	Age	Home	Occupation	Honeymoon	Final decision	Status
1	Sara Mesa	29	Sydney, New South Wales	Nutritionist	Nanuku Resort, Fiji	Yes	Separated
1	Tim Calwell	31	Gold Coast, Queensland	Online business owner	Nanuku Resort, Fiji	Yes	Separated
2	Cassandra Allen	29	Gold Coast, Queensland	Administration officer	Beresford Estate, McLaren Vale, South Australia	Broke up before final decision	Separated
2	Tristan Black	30	Sydney, New South Wales	Event manager	Beresford Estate, McLaren Vale, South Australia	Broke up before final decision	Separated
3	Timothy Smith	51	Melbourne, Victoria	Online business owner	Bannisters Port Stephens, New South Wales	Broke up before final decision	Separated
3	Lucinda Light	43	Byron Bay, New South Wales	Master of ceremonies and wedding celebrant	Bannisters Port Stephens, New South Wales	Broke up before final decision	Separated
4	Jack Dunkley	34	Gold Coast, Queensland	Personal trainer	Tamanu on the Beach, Vanuatu	Yes	Separated
4	Tori Adams	27	Melbourne, Victoria	Business development manager	Tamanu on the Beach, Vanuatu	Yes	Separated
5	Natalie Parham	32	Melbourne, Victoria	Physiotherapist	Eco Beach Resort, Broome, Western Australia	Broke up before final decision	Separated
5	Collins Christian	28	Sydney, New South Wales	Executive assistant	Eco Beach Resort, Broome, Western Australia	Broke up before final decision	Separated
6	Jayden Eynaud	26	Gold Coast, Queensland	Professional kickboxer	Club Wyndham, Airlie Beach, Queensland	Yes	Separated
6	Eden Harper	28	Gold Coast, Queensland	Recruitment manager	Club Wyndham, Airlie Beach, Queensland	Yes	Separated
7	Ellie Dix	32	Gold Coast, Queensland	Registered nurse	Milton Park, Bowral, New South Wales	Broke up before final decision	Separated
7	Ben Walters	39	Newcastle, New South Wales	Podcaster and construction worker	Milton Park, Bowral, New South Wales	Broke up before final decision	Separated
8	Richard Sauerman	62	Sydney, New South Wales	Motivational speaker	Hotel Sorrento, Sorrento, Victoria	Broke up before final decision	Separated
8	Andrea Thompson	51	Sunshine Coast, Queensland	Photographer	Hotel Sorrento, Sorrento, Victoria	Broke up before final decision	Separated
9	Lauren Dunn	32	Perth, Western Australia	Public relations and marketing consultant	Mount French Lodge, Charlwood, Queensland	No	Separated
9	Jonathan McCullough	39	Gold Coast, Queensland	Health business owner	Mount French Lodge, Charlwood, Queensland	No	Separated
10	Stephen Stewart	26	Perth, Western Australia	Hairdresser	MacQ1, Hobart, Tasmania	Broke up before final decision	Separated
10	Michael Felix	34	Melbourne, Victoria	Salesperson	MacQ1, Hobart, Tasmania	Broke up before final decision	Separated
11	Madeleine Maxwell	30	Melbourne, Victoria	Psychic medium	Cupitt's Estate, Ulladulla, New South Wales	Broke up before final decision	Separated
11	Ash Galati	33	Melbourne, Victoria	Sales manager	Cupitt's Estate, Ulladulla, New South Wales	Broke up before final decision	Separated
12	Ridge Barredo	27	Sydney, New South Wales	Psychiatric nurse	The Anchorage, Port Stephens, New South Wales	Yes	Together
12	Jade Pywell	26	Gold Coast, Queensland	Executive assistant	The Anchorage, Port Stephens, New South Wales	Yes	Together

== Commitment ceremony history ==
Episode:	9	13	17	21	25	29	33	35/36
Ceremony:	1	2	3	4	5	6	7	Final decision
Sara	Stay	Stay	Stay	Stay	Stay	Stay	Stay	Yes
Tim	Stay	Stay	Stay	Stay	Leave	Stay	Stay	Yes
Eden	Stay	Stay	Stay	Stay	Stay	Stay	Stay	Yes
Jayden	Stay	Stay	Stay	Stay	Stay	Stay	Stay	Yes
Jade	Not in experiment		Stay	Stay	Stay	Stay	Stay	Yes
Ridge	Not in experiment		Stay	Stay	Stay	Stay	Stay	Yes
Tori	Stay	Stay	Stay	Stay	Stay	Stay	Stay	Yes
Jack	Stay	Stay	Stay	Stay	Stay	Stay	Stay	Yes
Lauren	Stay	Stay	Stay	Stay	Stay	Stay	Stay	No
Jonathan	Stay	Stay	Stay	Stay	Stay	Stay	Stay	No
Lucinda	Stay	Stay	Stay	Stay	Stay	Stay	Leave	Left
Timothy	Stay	Stay	Stay	Stay	Stay	Stay	Leave	Left
Andrea	Stay	Stay	Stay	Stay	Stay	Leave	Left	
Richard	Stay	Stay	Stay	Stay	Stay	Leave	Left	
Cassandra	Stay	Stay	Stay	Stay	Leave	Leave	Left	
Tristan	Stay	Stay	Leave	Stay	Stay	Leave	Left	
Stephen	Not in experiment		Stay	Stay	Leave	Left		
Michael	Not in experiment		Stay	Stay	Leave	Left		
Ellie	Stay	Stay	Leave	Leave	Left			
Ben	Stay	Stay	Stay	Leave	Left			
Madeleine	Not in experiment		Leave	Left				
Ash	Not in experiment		Stay	Left				
Natalie	Leave	Left						
Collins	Stay	Left						
Notes	none	1	2, 3	none				
Left	none	Natalie & Collins	Madeleine & Ash	Ellie & Ben	Stephen & Michael	Cassandra & Tristan	Lucinda & Timothy	Lauren & Jonathan
Left	none	Natalie & Collins	Madeleine & Ash	Ellie & Ben	Stephen & Michael	Andrea & Richard	Lucinda & Timothy	Lauren & Jonathan

This couple left the experiment outside of commitment ceremony.
This couple elected to leave the experiment during the commitment ceremony.

- ^1: Natalie left the experiment on her own. Due to this, Collins also had to leave the experiment.
- ^2: Three new couples were introduced into the experiment.
- ^3: Madeleine was removed from the experiment after the third commitment ceremony. Due to this, Ash also had to leave the experiment.

== Ratings ==
On 28 January 2024, OzTAM's rating data recording system changed. Viewership data then focused on National Reach and National Total ratings instead of the five metro centres and overnight shares.

No.	Title	Air date	Timeslot	National reach viewers	National total viewers	Night rank	Ref(s)
1	Episode 1	29 January 2024	Monday 7:30 pm	2,461,000	1,252,000	1	
2	Episode 2	30 January 2024	Tuesday 7:30 pm	2,419,000	1,284,000	1	
3	Episode 3	31 January 2024	Wednesday 7:30 pm	2,349,000	1,236,000	1	
4	Episode 4	1 February 2024	Thursday 7:30 pm	2,340,000	1,229,000	1	
5	Episode 5	4 February 2024	Sunday 7:00 pm	2,522,000	1,338,000	1	
6	Episode 6	5 February 2024	Monday 7:30 pm	2,519,000	1,496,000	1	
7	Episode 7	6 February 2024	Tuesday 7:30 pm	2,411,000	1,406,000	1	
8	Episode 8	7 February 2024	Wednesday 7:30 pm	2,476,000	1,312,000	1	
9	Episode 9	11 February 2024	Sunday 7:00 pm	2,594,000	1,549,000	1	
10	Episode 10	12 February 2024	Monday 7:30 pm	2,507,000	1,429,000	2	
11	Episode 11	13 February 2024	Tuesday 7:30 pm	2,265,000	1,295,000	1	
12	Episode 12	14 February 2024	Wednesday 7:30 pm	2,372,000	1,369,000	1	
13	Episode 13	18 February 2024	Sunday 7:00 pm	2,663,000	1,576,000	1	
14	Episode 14	19 February 2024	Monday 7:30 pm	2,505,000	1,360,000	1	
15	Episode 15	20 February 2024	Tuesday 7:30 pm	2,409,000	1,371,000	1	
16	Episode 16	21 February 2024	Wednesday 7:30 pm	2,590,000	1,529,000	1	
17	Episode 17	25 February 2024	Sunday 7:00 pm	2,832,000	1,752,000	1	
18	Episode 18	26 February 2024	Monday 7:30 pm	2,450,000	1,506,000	1	
19	Episode 19	27 February 2024	Tuesday 7:30 pm	2,369,000	1,406,000	1	
20	Episode 20	28 February 2024	Wednesday 7:30 pm	2,558,000	1,486,000	1	
21	Episode 21	3 March 2024	Sunday 7:00 pm	3,040,000	1,756,000	1	
22	Episode 22	4 March 2024	Monday 7:30 pm	2,778,000	1,619,000	1	
23	Episode 23	5 March 2024	Tuesday 7:30 pm	2,666,000	1,660,000	1	
24	Episode 24	6 March 2024	Wednesday 7:30 pm	2,695,000	1,721,000	1	
25	Episode 25	10 March 2024	Sunday 7:00 pm	2,932,000	1,714,000	1	
26	Episode 26	11 March 2024	Monday 7:30 pm	2,692,000	1,575,000	1	
27	Episode 27	12 March 2024	Tuesday 7:30 pm	2,596,000	1,489,000	1	
28	Episode 28	13 March 2024	Wednesday 7:30 pm	2,578,000	1,588,000	1	
29	Episode 29	17 March 2024	Sunday 7:00 pm	2,931,000	1,752,000	1	
30	Episode 30	18 March 2024	Monday 7:30 pm	2,815,000	1,588,000	1	
31	Episode 31	19 March 2024	Tuesday 7:30 pm	2,551,000	1,503,000	1	
32	Episode 32	20 March 2024	Wednesday 7:30 pm	2,591,000	1,608,000	1	
33	Episode 33	24 March 2024	Sunday 7:00 pm	2,802,000	1,648,000	1	
34	Episode 34	25 March 2024	Monday 7:30 pm	2,554,000	1,599,000	1	
35	Final Vows Part 1	31 March 2024	Sunday 7:00 pm	2,505,000	1,452,000	1	
36	Final Vows Part 2	1 April 2024	Monday 7:30 pm	2,763,000	1,611,000	1	
37	Reunion Dinner Party	7 April 2024	Sunday 7:00 pm	2,910,000	1,706,000	1	
38	Reunion Finale	8 April 2024	Monday 7:30 pm	2,752,000	1,731,000	1	
