= Married at First Sight (Australian TV series) season 4 =

Married at First Sight
- Season 4
- No. of episodes: 29

Release
- Original network: Nine Network
- Original release: 30 January – 3 April 2017

Season chronology
- ← Previous; Season 3 Next → Season 5

The fourth season of Married at First Sight premiered on 30 January 2017 on the Nine Network. Relationship experts John Aiken, Mel Schilling and Trisha Stratford all returned from the previous season to match ten brides and ten grooms. In episode 9 of the experiment, the experts re-matched Cheryl and Andrew after their previous marriages came to abrupt ends.

== Couple profiles ==
No.	Couple	Age	Home	Occupation	Honeymoon	Final Decision	Status
1	Susan Rawlings	37	Perth, Western Australia	Mining truck driver	Airlie Beach, Queensland	No	Separated
1	Sean Hollands	35	Maryborough, Queensland	Farmer	Airlie Beach, Queensland	No	Separated
2	Cheryl Maitland	25	Gold Coast, Queensland	Hair salon assistant	Queenstown, New Zealand	Broke up before final decision	Separated
2	Jonathan Troughton	30	Brisbane, Queensland	Entrepreneur	Queenstown, New Zealand	Broke up before final decision	Separated
3	Scarlett Cooper	30	Sydney, New South Wales	Aspiring author	Kakadu National Park, Northern Territory	Broke up before final decision	Separated
3	Michael Tomic	30	Perth, Western Australia	Data entry clerk/stripper	Kakadu National Park, Northern Territory	Broke up before final decision	Separated
4	Nadia Stamp	36	Brisbane, Queensland	Flight attendant/model	Daintree Rainforest, Queensland	Yes	Separated
4	Anthony Manton	33	Sydney, New South Wales	Racing broadcaster	Daintree Rainforest, Queensland	Yes	Separated
5	Alene Khatcherian	31	Sydney, New South Wales	Registered nurse	Magnetic Island	Yes	Separated
5	Simon McQuillan	36	Ipswich, Queensland	Business owner	Magnetic Island	Yes	Separated
6	Vanessa Belvedere	31	Melbourne, Victoria	Student	Fiji	Yes	Separated
6	Andy Hills	30	Gold Coast, Queensland	Aerodrome plant operator	Fiji	Yes	Separated
7	Lauren Bran	33	Sydney, New South Wales	Automotive aftermarket sales	N/A	Broke up before final decision	Separated
7	Andrew Jones	38	Perth, Western Australia	Firefighter	N/A	Broke up before final decision	Separated
8	Deborah Brosnan	53	Sunshine Coast, Queensland	Ex-model	Samoa	Broke up before final decision	Separated
8	John Robertson	53	Melbourne, Victoria	Business owner	Samoa	Broke up before final decision	Separated
9	Michelle Marsh	31	Perth, Western Australia	Commercial cleaner	Katherine, Northern Territory	No	Separated
9	Jesse Konstantinoff	31	Adelaide, South Australia	Retailer	Katherine, Northern Territory	No	Separated
10	Sharon Marsh	31	Perth, Western Australia	Business owner	Koh Samui, Thailand	Yes	Separated
10	Nick Furphy	30	Melbourne, Victoria	Carpenter	Koh Samui, Thailand	Yes	Separated
11	Cheryl Maitland	25	Gold Coast, Queensland	Hair salon assistant	N/A	Broke up before final decision	Separated
11	Andrew Jones	38	Perth, Western Australia	Firefighter	N/A	Broke up before final decision	Separated

== Commitment ceremony history ==
Episode:	8	11	13	16	19	23-25
Ceremony:	1	2	3	4	5	Final Decision
Nadia	Stay	Stay	Stay	Stay	Stay	Yes
Anthony	Stay	Stay	Stay	Stay	Stay	Yes
Alene	Stay	Stay	Stay	Stay	Stay	Yes
Simon	Stay	Stay	Stay	Stay	Stay	Yes
Vanessa	Stay	Stay	Stay	Stay	Stay	Yes
Andy	Stay	Stay	Stay	Stay	Stay	Yes
Sharon	Stay	Stay	Stay	Stay	Stay	Yes
Nick	Stay	Stay	Stay	Stay	Stay	Yes
Susan	Stay	Stay	Stay	Stay	Stay	No
Sean	Stay	Stay	Stay	Stay	Stay	Yes
Michelle	Stay	Stay	Stay	Stay	Stay	No
Jesse	Stay	Stay	Stay	Stay	Stay	Yes
Cheryl	Not in Experiment	Stay	Stay	Stay	Leave	Left
Andrew	Not in Experiment	Stay	Stay	Leave	Leave	Left
Deborah	Stay	Left				
John	Leave	Left				
Cheryl	Leave	Left				
Jonathan	Leave	Left				
Michael	Leave	Left				
Scarlett	Leave	Left				
Lauren	Left					
Andrew	Left					
Notes	1, 2	3, 4	none			
Left	Lauren & Andrew	Deborah & John	none	none	Cheryl & Andrew	Susan & Sean
Left	Cheryl & Jonathan	Deborah & John	none	none	Cheryl & Andrew	Susan & Sean
Left	Scarlett & Michael	Deborah & John	none	none	Cheryl & Andrew	Michelle & Jesse

This couple left the experiment outside of commitment ceremony.
This couple elected to leave the experiment during the commitment ceremony.

- ^1: Lauren and Andrew left the experiment after Lauren walked out after their wedding.
- ^2: Jonathan originally chose to "stay", but changed his mind to leave after the commitment ceremony.
- ^3: John left the experiment on his own. Due to this, Deborah also had to leave the experiment.
- ^4: Andrew was asked to re-join the experiment with Cheryl as a new couple.

== Controversy ==
Groom Andrew Jones shocked viewers when during a "boy's night" he made sexist and mocking comments about wife Cheryl Maitland's appearance and intelligence. During the Reunion, Andrew failed to apologise for his actions, insisting that his behaviour was acceptable. Fellow Groom Anthony Manton was accused of bullying wife Nadia Stamp, with viewers labelling him as "arrogant" and "controlling" after he complained about a lack of intimacy in their relationship.

== Ratings ==
No.	Title	Air date	Timeslot	Overnight ratings		Consolidated ratings		Total viewers	Ref(s)
No.	Title	Air date	Timeslot	Viewers	Rank	Viewers	Rank	Total viewers	Ref(s)
1	Episode 1	30 January 2017	Monday 7:30pm	820,000	10	84,000	9	904,000	
2	Episode 2	31 January 2017	Tuesday 7:30pm	927,000	5	79,000	5	1,006,000	
3	Episode 3	1 February 2017	Wednesday 7:30pm	824,000	6	75,000	5	899,000	
4	Episode 4	5 February 2017	Sunday 7:00pm	909,000	4	90,000	4	999,000	
5	Episode 5	6 February 2017	Monday 7:30pm	893,000	6	100,000	6	993,000	
6	Episode 6	7 February 2017	Tuesday 7:30pm	920,000	6	96,000	2	1,016,000	
7	Episode 7	8 February 2017	Wednesday 7:30pm	905,000	6	112,000	3	1,017,000	
8	Episode 8	12 February 2017	Sunday 7:00pm	1,064,000	3	103,000	2	1,167,000	
9	Episode 9	13 February 2017	Monday 7:30pm	1,107,000	2	108,000	2	1,215,000	
10	Episode 10	14 February 2017	Tuesday 7:30pm	1,024,000	1	119,000	2	1,143,000	
11	Episode 11	20 February 2017	Monday 7:30pm	1,096,000	2	96,000	2	1,192,000	
12	Episode 12	21 February 2017	Tuesday 7:30pm	1,062,000	2	152,000	2	1,214,000	
13	Episode 13	26 February 2017	Sunday 7:00pm	1,113,000	1	129,000	1	1,242,000	
14	Episode 14	27 February 2017	Monday 7:30pm	1,101,000	2	123,000	1	1,224,000	
15	Episode 15	28 February 2017	Tuesday 7:30pm	1,092,000	1	144,000	1	1,236,000	
16	Episode 16	5 March 2017	Sunday 7:00pm	1,170,000	1	86,000	1	1,256,000	
17	Episode 17	6 March 2017	Monday 7:30pm	1,099,000	1	101,000	1	1,200,000	
18	Episode 18	7 March 2017	Tuesday 7:30pm	1,122,000	1	117,000	1	1,239,000	
19	Episode 19	12 March 2017	Sunday 7:00pm	1,160,000	1	91,000	1	1,251,000	
20	Episode 20	13 March 2017	Monday 7:30pm	1,060,000	1	103,000	1	1,163,000	
21	Episode 21	14 March 2017	Tuesday 7:30pm	1,148,000	1	104,000	1	1,252,000	
22	Episode 22	19 March 2017	Sunday 7:30pm	1,190,000	1	102,000	1	1,292,000	
23	Final Vows Part 1	20 March 2017	Monday 7:30pm	1,239,000	1	108,000	1	1,347,000	
24	Final Vows Part 2	21 March 2017	Tuesday 7:30pm	1,194,000	1	93,000	1	1,287,000	
25	Final Vows Part 3	26 March 2017	Sunday 7:00pm	1,157,000	1	72,000	1	1,229,000	
26	Episode 26	27 March 2017	Monday 7:30pm	1,163,000	2	137,000	2	1,300,000	
27	Episode 27	28 March 2017	Tuesday 7:30pm	1,034,000	5	112,000	2	1,146,000	
28	Reunion Dinner Party	2 April 2017	Sunday 7:30pm	1,379,000	1	98,000	1	1,477,000	
29	Reunion Finale	3 April 2017	Monday 7:30pm	1,389,000	1	107,000	1	1,496,000	
