= Married at First Sight (Australian TV series) season 6 =

Married at First Sight
- Season 6
- No. of episodes: 41

Release
- Original network: Nine Network
- Original release: 28 January – 8 April 2019

Season chronology
- ← Previous; Season 5 Next → Season 7

The sixth season of Married at First Sight premiered on 28 January 2019 on the Nine Network. Relationship experts John Aiken, Mel Schilling and Trisha Stratford all returned from the previous season to match ten brides and ten grooms. Halfway through the experiment, the experts matched another two brides and two grooms together.

== Couple profiles ==
No.	Couple	Age	Home	Occupation	Honeymoon	Final Decision	Status
1	Jules Robinson	36	Sydney, New South Wales	Business owner	New Zealand	Yes	Married with children
1	Cameron Merchant	34	Sydney, New South Wales	Former pro cricketer	New Zealand	Yes	Married with children
2	Cyrell Paule	29	Sydney, New South Wales	Healthcare consultant	New Zealand	Broke up before final decision	Separated
2	Nic Jovanović	27	Newcastle, New South Wales	Electrician	New Zealand	Broke up before final decision	Separated
3	Jessika Power	27	Perth, Western Australia	Administration officer	Palm Cove, Queensland	Broke up before final decision	Separated
3	Mick Gould	31	Gympie, Queensland	Plasterer/farmer	Palm Cove, Queensland	Broke up before final decision	Separated
4	Melissa Lucarelli	38	Sydney, New South Wales	Talent agent	Fiji	Broke up before final decision	Separated
4	Dino Hira	34	Perth, Western Australia	Meditation facilitator	Fiji	Broke up before final decision	Separated
5	Heidi Latcham	38	Sunshine Coast, Queensland	Radio announcer	Whitsundays, Queensland	Yes	Separated
5	Mike Gunner	44	Brisbane, Queensland	Electrician	Whitsundays, Queensland	Yes	Separated
6	Ning Surasiang	32	Townsville, Queensland	Hairdresser	Bangkok, Thailand	No	Separated
6	Mark Scrivens	42	Melbourne, Victoria	Ex-army	Bangkok, Thailand	No	Separated
7	Elizabeth Sobinoff	27	Newcastle, New South Wales	Store manager	N/A	Broke up before final decision	Separated
7	Sam Ball	26	Sydney, New South Wales	Tradie	N/A	Broke up before final decision	Separated
8	Lauren Huntriss	31	Sydney, New South Wales	Makeup artist	McLaren Vale, South Australia	Broke up before final decision	Separated
8	Matthew Bennett	29	Brisbane, Queensland	Videographer	McLaren Vale, South Australia	Broke up before final decision	Separated
9	Ines Bašić	28	Brisbane, Queensland	Legal assistant	Port Douglas, Queensland	Broke up before final decision	Separated
9	Bronson Norrish	34	Perth, Western Australia	Entrepreneur	Port Douglas, Queensland	Broke up before final decision	Separated
10	Martha Kalifatidis	31	Sydney, New South Wales	Makeup artist	Samoa	Yes	Engaged with children
10	Michael Brunelli	29	Melbourne, Victoria	Teacher	Samoa	Yes	Engaged with children
11	Susie Bradley	25	Jimboomba, Queensland	Aged care nurse	Shoalhaven, New South Wales	Broke up before final decision	Separated
11	Billy Vincent	28	Lennox Head, New South Wales	Barista	Shoalhaven, New South Wales	Broke up before final decision	Separated
12	Dan Webb	35	Gold Coast, Queensland	Car broker	Hunter Valley, New South Wales	Broke up before final decision	Separated
12	Tamara Joy	29	Melbourne, Victoria	Administrator	Hunter Valley, New South Wales	Broke up before final decision	Separated
13	Jessika Power	27	Perth, Western Australia	Administration officer	N/A	Yes	Separated
13	Dan Webb	35	Gold Coast, Queensland	Car broker	N/A	Yes	Separated

== Commitment ceremony history ==
Episode:	9	13	17	21	25	29	33	37-39
Ceremony:	1	2	3	4	5	6	7	Final Decision
Jules	Stay	Stay	Stay	Stay	Stay	Stay	Stay	Yes
Cameron	Stay	Stay	Stay	Stay	Stay	Stay	Stay	Yes
Martha	Stay	Stay	Stay	Stay	Stay	Stay	Stay	Yes
Michael	Stay	Stay	Stay	Stay	Stay	Stay	Stay	Yes
Heidi	Stay	Stay	Stay	Stay	Stay	Stay	Stay	Yes
Mike	Stay	Stay	Stay	Stay	Stay	Stay	Stay	Yes
Jessika	Not in Experiment						N/A	Yes
Dan	Not in Experiment						N/A	Yes
Ning	Stay	Leave	Stay	Stay	Stay	Stay	Leave	Yes
Mark	Stay	Stay	Stay	Stay	Stay	Stay	Stay	No
Jessika	Stay	Stay	Stay	Stay	Stay	Stay	Leave	Left
Mick	Stay	Stay	Stay	Leave	Leave	Leave	Leave	Left
Tamara	Not in Experiment			Stay	Stay	Stay	N/A	Left
Dan	Not in Experiment			Stay	Stay	Stay	Leave	Left
Cyrell	Stay	Stay	Stay	Stay	Stay	Leave	Left	
Nic	Stay	Stay	Stay	Leave	Stay	Leave	Left	
Susie	Not in Experiment			Stay	Stay	Leave	Left	
Billy	Not in Experiment			Stay	Leave	Leave	Left	
Melissa	Stay	Stay	Stay	Leave	Left			
Dino	Stay	Stay	Stay	Leave	Left			
Elizabeth	Stay	N/A	Leave	Left				
Sam	Leave	Stay	Leave	Left				
Ines	Leave	Stay	Leave	Left				
Bronson	Stay	Stay	Leave	Left				
Lauren	Stay	Leave	Left					
Matthew	Stay	Leave	Left					
Notes	none	1	none	2	none		3	4
Left	none	Lauren & Matthew	Elizabeth & Sam	Melissa & Dino	none	Cyrell & Nic	Jessika & Mick	Ning & Mark
Left	none	Lauren & Matthew	Ines & Bronson	Melissa & Dino	none	Susie & Billy	Tamara & Dan	Ning & Mark

This couple elected to leave the experiment during the commitment ceremony.

- ^1: Elizabeth was not able to be at the commitment ceremony due to illness.
- ^2: Two new couples were introduced into the experiment.
- ^3: Jessika and Dan both wrote "leave", but asked the experts if they could become a couple. The experts allowed them to re-enter the experiment as a couple. Due to this, Tamara had to leave the experiment.
- ^4: Cameron proposed to Jules at their final vows.

== Controversy ==
The experts had to decide on a controversial request by Dan and Jess who wanted to leave their respective "spouses" but remain in the experiment as a couple. The experts allowed the couple to leave their previous matches and stay in the experiment as a new couple. As a result of the decision, an online petition garnered thousands of votes to have the show cancelled.

== Ratings ==
No.	Title	Air date	Timeslot	Overnight ratings		Consolidated ratings		Total viewers	Ref(s)
No.	Title	Air date	Timeslot	Viewers	Rank	Viewers	Rank	Total viewers	Ref(s)
1	Episode 1	28 January 2019	Monday 7:30pm	1,003,000	2	144,000	1	1,147,000	
2	Episode 2	29 January 2019	Tuesday 7:30pm	955,000	2	107,000	1	1,062,000	
3	Episode 3	30 January 2019	Wednesday 7:30pm	1,027,000	1	115,000	1	1,142,000	
4	Episode 4	31 January 2019	Thursday 7:30pm	1,001,000	1	96,000	1	1,097,000	
5	Episode 5	3 February 2019	Sunday 7:30pm	1,088,000	1	78,000	1	1,166,000	
6	Episode 6	4 February 2019	Monday 7:30pm	1,117,000	1	136,000	1	1,253,000	
7	Episode 7	5 February 2019	Tuesday 7:30pm	1,167,000	1	146,000	1	1,313,000	
8	Episode 8	6 February 2019	Wednesday 7:30pm	1,282,000	1	145,000	1	1,427,000	
9	Episode 9	10 February 2019	Sunday 7:00pm	1,263,000	1	107,000	1	1,370,000	
10	Episode 10	11 February 2019	Monday 7:30pm	1,298,000	1	117,000	1	1,415,000	
11	Episode 11	12 February 2019	Tuesday 7:30pm	1,183,000	1	109,000	1	1,292,000	
12	Episode 12	13 February 2019	Wednesday 7:30pm	1,290,000	1	142,000	1	1,432,000	
13	Episode 13	17 February 2019	Sunday 7:00pm	1,291,000	1	105,000	1	1,395,000	
14	Episode 14	18 February 2019	Monday 7:30pm	1,205,000	1	91,000	1	1,299,000	
15	Episode 15	19 February 2019	Tuesday 7:30pm	1,349,000	1	116,000	1	1,463,000	
16	Episode 16	20 February 2019	Wednesday 7:30pm	1,329,000	1	119,000	1	1,447,000	
17	Episode 17	24 February 2019	Sunday 7:00pm	1,659,000	1	136,000	1	1,796,000	
18	Episode 18	25 February 2019	Monday 7:30pm	1,293,000	1	103,000	1	1,400,000	
19	Episode 19	26 February 2019	Tuesday 7:30pm	1,261,000	1	120,000	1	1,380,000	
20	Episode 20	27 February 2019	Wednesday 7:30pm	1,277,000	1	147,000	1	1,421,000	
21	Episode 21	3 March 2019	Sunday 7:30pm	1,451,000	1	92,000	1	1,543,000	
22	Episode 22	4 March 2019	Monday 7:30pm	1,293,000	1	93,000	1	1,386,000	
23	Episode 23	5 March 2019	Tuesday 7:30pm	1,282,000	1	108,000	1	1,390,000	
24	Episode 24	6 March 2019	Wednesday 7:30pm	1,301,000	1	118,000	1	1,419,000	
25	Episode 25	10 March 2019	Sunday 7:00pm	1,281,000	1	101,000	1	1,382,000	
26	Episode 26	11 March 2019	Monday 7:30pm	1,360,000	1	88,000	1	1,448,000	
27	Episode 27	12 March 2019	Tuesday 7:30pm	1,245,000	1	82,000	1	1,327,000	
28	Episode 28	13 March 2019	Wednesday 7:30pm	1,407,000	1	105,000	1	1,512,000	
29	Episode 29	17 March 2019	Sunday 7:00pm	1,476,000	1	109,000	1	1,585,000	
30	Episode 30	18 March 2019	Monday 7:30pm	1,351,000	1	106,000	1	1,457,000	
31	Episode 31	19 March 2019	Tuesday 7:30pm	1,306,000	1	112,000	1	1,418,000	
32	Episode 32	20 March 2019	Wednesday 7:30pm	1,454,000	1	118,000	1	1,572,000	
33	Episode 33	24 March 2019	Sunday 7:00pm	1,685,000	1	96,000	1	1,781,000	
34	Episode 34	25 March 2019	Monday 7:30pm	1,315,000	1	81,000	1	1,396,000	
35	Episode 35	26 March 2019	Tuesday 7:30pm	1,225,000	1	95,000	1	1,320,000	
36	Episode 36	27 March 2019	Wednesday 7:30pm	1,374,000	1	138,000	1	1,512,000	
37	Final Vows Part 1	31 March 2019	Sunday 7:00pm	1,485,000	1	74,000	1	1,559,000	
38	Final Vows Part 2	1 April 2019	Monday 7:30pm	1,407,000	1	73,000	1	1,480,000	
39	Final Vows Part 3	2 April 2019	Tuesday 7:30pm	1,388,000	1	84,000	1	1,472,000	
40	Reunion Dinner Party & Reunion Finale	7 April 2019 & 8 April 2019	Sunday 7:00pm & Monday 7:30pm	1,858,000 & 1,968,000	1	85,000 & 112,000	1	1,943,000 & 2,080,000	
