= Married at First Sight (Australian TV series) season 8 =

Married at First Sight
- Season 8
- No. of episodes: 32

Release
- Original network: Nine Network
- Original release: 22 February – 18 April 2021

Season chronology
- ← Previous; Season 7 Next → Season 9

The eighth season of Married at First Sight premiered on 22 February 2021 on the Nine Network. Relationship experts John Aiken and Mel Schilling returned from the previous season, and were joined by sexologist Alessandra Rampolla to match nine brides and nine grooms. Halfway through the experiment, the experts matched another three brides and three grooms together.

== Couple profiles ==
No.	Couple	Age	Home	Occupation	Honeymoon	Final Decision	Status
1	Melissa Rawson	31	Melbourne, Victoria	Workplace Trainer	Edith, New South Wales	Yes	Married with children
1	Bryce Ruthven	31	Canberra, Australian Capital Territory	Radio Announcer	Edith, New South Wales	Yes	Married with children
2	Rebecca Zemek	27	Perth, Western Australia	Business Manager	Hunter Valley, New South Wales	Yes	Separated
2	Jake Edwards	32	Melbourne, Victoria	Charity CEO	Hunter Valley, New South Wales	Yes	Separated
3	Samantha Harvey	31	Canberra, Australian Capital Territory	Property Developer	Casuarina, New South Wales	Broke up before final decision	Separated
3	Cameron Dunne	32	Melbourne, Victoria	Crane Operator	Casuarina, New South Wales	Broke up before final decision	Separated
4	Booka Nile	31	Perth, Western Australia	Musician/Mental Health Worker	South Coast, New South Wales	Broke up before final decision	Separated
4	Brett Helling	31	Melbourne, Victoria	Psychology Student/Electrician	South Coast, New South Wales	Broke up before final decision	Separated
5	Coco Stedman	30	Sydney, New South Wales	Pilates Studio Owner	South Coast, New South Wales	Broke up before final decision	Separated
5	Sam Carraro	32	Melbourne, Victoria	Clothing Brand Owner	South Coast, New South Wales	Broke up before final decision	Separated
6	Alana Lister	30	Brisbane, Queensland	Teacher	South Coast, New South Wales	Yes	Separated
6	Jason Engler	35	Brisbane, Queensland	Construction Estimator	South Coast, New South Wales	Yes	Separated
7	Joanne Todd	39	Melbourne, Victoria	Barber	Shoalhaven, New South Wales	Broke up before final decision	Separated
7	James Susler	44	Melbourne, Victoria	Prestige Car Company Owner	Shoalhaven, New South Wales	Broke up before final decision	Separated
8	Belinda Vickers	29	Melbourne, Victoria	Door-to-Door Sales	Caves Beach, New South Wales	Yes	Separated
8	Patrick Hayes Dwyer	27	Melbourne, Victoria	Personal Trainer	Caves Beach, New South Wales	Yes	Separated
9	Beth Moore	39	Perth, Western Australia	Retail Worker/Student	Mimosa Rocks, New South Wales	Broke up before final decision	Separated
9	Russell Duance	37	Adelaide, South Australia	Diesel Mechanic	Mimosa Rocks, New South Wales	Broke up before final decision	Separated
10	Georgia Fairweather	25	Brisbane, Queensland	Entrepreneur	Hunter Valley, New South Wales	No	Separated
10	Liam Cooper	29	Brisbane, Queensland	Prison Case Officer	Hunter Valley, New South Wales	No	Separated
11	Kerry Knight	30	Sunshine Coast, Queensland	Occupation Therapist	Cabarita, New South Wales	Yes	Married with child
11	Johnny Balbuziente	30	Brisbane, Queensland	Theatre Producer	Cabarita, New South Wales	Yes	Married with child
12	Jaimie Gardner	35	Sydney, New South Wales	Brand Manager	Adelaide, South Australia	Broke up before final decision	Separated
12	Chris Jensen	32	Sunshine Coast, Queensland	FIFO Driller	Adelaide, South Australia	Broke up before final decision	Separated

== Commitment ceremony history ==
Episode:	9	13	17	21	25	29/30
Ceremony:	1	2	3	4	5	Final Decision
Melissa	Stay	Stay	Stay	Stay	Stay	Yes
Bryce	Stay	Stay	Stay	Stay	Stay	Yes
Rebecca	Stay	Leave	Stay	Stay	Leave	Yes
Jake	Stay	Stay	Stay	Stay	Stay	Yes
Alana	Stay	Stay	Stay	Stay	Stay	Yes
Jason	Stay	Stay	Stay	Stay	Stay	Yes
Belinda	Stay	Stay	Stay	Stay	Stay	Yes
Patrick	Stay	Stay	Stay	Stay	Stay	Yes
Kerry	Not in Experiment		Stay	Stay	Stay	Yes
Johnny	Not in Experiment		Stay	Stay	Stay	Yes
Georgia	Not in Experiment		Stay	Stay	Stay	Yes
Liam	Not in Experiment		Stay	Stay	Stay	No
Booka	Stay	Stay	Stay	Leave	Leave	Left
Brett	Stay	Stay	Stay	Stay	Leave	Left
Jaimie	Not in Experiment		Stay	Left		
Chris	Not in Experiment		Stay	Left		
Joanne	Stay	Stay	Leave	Left		
James	Stay	Leave	Leave	Left		
Beth	Stay	Leave	Left			
Russell	Leave	Leave	Left			
Coco	Leave	Leave	Left			
Sam	Stay	Leave	Left			
Samantha	Leave	Leave	Left			
Cameron	Stay	Leave	Left			
Notes	none	none	1	2	none	3, 4
Left	none	Beth & Russell	Joanne & James	Jaimie & Chris	Booka & Brett	Georgia & Liam
Left	none	Coco & Sam	Joanne & James	Jaimie & Chris	Booka & Brett	Georgia & Liam
Left	none	Samantha & Cameron	Joanne & James	Jaimie & Chris	Booka & Brett	Georgia & Liam

This couple left the experiment outside of commitment ceremony.
This couple elected to leave the experiment during the commitment ceremony.

- ^1: Three new couples were introduced into the experiment.
- ^2: Chris left the experiment on his own. Due to this, Jaimie also had to leave the experiment.
- ^3: Alana originally decided to leave, but changed her mind to stay after hearing Jason's vows.
- ^4: Liam originally decided to stay, but changed his mind to leave after hearing Georgia's vows.

== Controversy ==
The season was heavily criticised by media outlets and fans of the show due to the lack of diversity in casting. The series also saw accusations of misogyny against a number of the male participants. In June the Australian Communications and Media Authority revealed they were looking into the season after receiving 54 complaints from viewers about the show. Several of the complaints alleged the series had aired abusive interactions between participants through "gaslighting, social, verbal and mental abuse". The Network was later cleared of any breaches.

== Ratings ==
No.	Title	Air date	Timeslot	Overnight ratings		Consolidated ratings		Total viewers	Ref(s)
No.	Title	Air date	Timeslot	Viewers	Rank	Viewers	Rank	Total viewers	Ref(s)
1	Episode 1	22 February 2021	Monday 7:30pm	964,000	1	110,000	1	1,074,000	
2	Episode 2	23 February 2021	Tuesday 7:30pm	992,000	1	105,000	1	1,097,000	
3	Episode 3	24 February 2021	Wednesday 7:30pm	891,000	2	128,000	1	1,019,000	
4	Episode 4	25 February 2021	Thursday 7:30pm	773,000	5	151,000	1	924,000	
5	Episode 5	28 February 2021	Sunday 7:00pm	898,000	1	114,000	1	1,012,000	
6	Episode 6	1 March 2021	Monday 7:30pm	1,020,000	1	110,000	1	1,130,000	
7	Episode 7	2 March 2021	Tuesday 7:30pm	944,000	1	115,000	1	1,059,000	
8	Episode 8	3 March 2021	Wednesday 7:30pm	932,000	1	111,000	1	1,043,000	
9	Episode 9	7 March 2021	Sunday 7:00pm	945,000	1	131,000	1	1,076,000	
10	Episode 10	8 March 2021	Monday 7:30pm	804,000	7	97,000	6	901,000	
11	Episode 11	9 March 2021	Tuesday 7:30pm	945,000	2	89,000	1	1,034,000	
12	Episode 12	10 March 2021	Wednesday 7:30pm	969,000	1	104,000	1	1,073,000	
13	Episode 13	14 March 2021	Sunday 7:00pm	1,096,000	1	92,000	1	1,188,000	
14	Episode 14	15 March 2021	Monday 7:30pm	979,000	1	106,000	1	1,085,000	
15	Episode 15	16 March 2021	Tuesday 7:30pm	1,026,000	1	108,000	1	1,134,000	
16	Episode 16	17 March 2021	Wednesday 7:30pm	1,030,000	1	121,000	1	1,151,000	
17	Episode 17	21 March 2021	Sunday 7:00pm	1,116,000	1	86,000	1	1,202,000	
18	Episode 18	22 March 2021	Monday 7:30pm	1,068,000	3	75,000	1	1,143,000	
19	Episode 19	23 March 2021	Tuesday 7:30pm	1,040,000	2	92,000	1	1,132,000	
20	Episode 20	24 March 2021	Wednesday 7:30pm	1,017,000	1	107,000	1	1,124,000	
21	Episode 21	28 March 2021	Sunday 7:30pm	1,106,000	1	85,000	1	1,191,000	
22	Episode 22	29 March 2021	Monday 7:30pm	1,065,000	1	94,000	1	1,159,000	
23	Episode 23	30 March 2021	Tuesday 7:30pm	1,031,000	1	99,000	1	1,130,000	
24	Episode 24	31 March 2021	Wednesday 7:30pm	1,003,000	1	126,000	1	1,129,000	
25	Episode 25	5 April 2021	Monday 7:30pm	1,121,000	2	94,000	1	1,215,000	
26	Episode 26	6 April 2021	Tuesday 7:30pm	1,009,000	1	65,000	1	1,074,000	
27	Episode 27	7 April 2021	Wednesday 7:30pm	1,100,000	1	86,000	1	1,186,000	
28	Episode 28	11 April 2021	Sunday 7:00pm	1,127,000	1	82,000	1	1,209,000	
29	Final Vows Part 1	12 April 2021	Monday 7:30pm	1,093,000	1	79,000	1	1,172,000	
30	Final Vows Part 2	13 April 2021	Tuesday 7:30pm	1,032,000	1	69,000	1	1,101,000	
31	Reunion Dinner Party	14 April 2021	Wednesday 7:30pm	1,134,000	1	112,000	1	1,246,000	
32	Reunion Finale	18 April 2021	Sunday 7:00pm	1,398,000	1	93,000	1	1,481,000	
