= Evelyn Ellis (disambiguation) =

Evelyn Ellis may refer to:

- Evelyn Ellis, American character actress
- Evelyn Henry Ellis, British motoring pioneer
- Evelyn Ellis, Australian marketing manager, model and reality television personality (Big Brother UK, Married at First Sight Australia)
