= Married at First Sight (Australian TV series) season 5 =

Married at First Sight
- Season 5
- No. of episodes: 32

Release
- Original network: Nine Network
- Original release: 29 January – 21 March 2018

Season chronology
- ← Previous; Season 4 Next → Season 6

The fifth season of Married at First Sight premiered on 29 January 2018 on the Nine Network. Relationship experts John Aiken, Mel Schilling and Trisha Stratford all returned from the previous season to match eleven brides and eleven grooms, including John Robertson who previously appeared in season 4.

== Couple profiles ==
No.	Couple	Age	Home	Occupation	Honeymoon	Final Decision	Status
1	Sarah Roza	38	Melbourne, Victoria	Beauty specialist	Cairns, Queensland	Yes	Separated
1	Telv Williams	33	Perth, Western Australia	Machinery technician	Cairns, Queensland	Yes	Separated
2	Tracey Jewel	34	Perth, Western Australia	Marketing consultant	Fiji	No	Separated
2	Dean Wells	39	Sydney, New South Wales	Executive creative director	Fiji	No	Separated
3	Alycia Galbraith	29	Adelaide, South Australia	Student	Fraser Island, Queensland	Broke up before final decision	Separated
3	Mathew Lockett	32	Melbourne, Victoria	Plumber	Fraser Island, Queensland	Broke up before final decision	Separated
4	Jo McPharlin	39	Adelaide, South Australia	Single mother	Singapore	Broke up before final decision	Separated
4	Sean Donnelly	39	Adelaide, South Australia	Pub manager	Singapore	Broke up before final decision	Separated
5	Davina Rankin	26	Brisbane, Queensland	Personal trainer/bikini model	Cook Islands	Broke up before final decision	Separated
5	Ryan Gallagher	29	Sydney, New South Wales	Tradesman	Cook Islands	Broke up before final decision	Separated
6	Charlene Perera	33	Melbourne, Victoria	Brand manager	Tasmania	Yes	Separated
6	Patrick Miller	34	Melbourne, Victoria	Operations manager	Tasmania	Yes	Separated
7	Melissa Walsh	53	Mornington Peninsula, Victoria	Journalist	New Zealand	Yes	Separated
7	John Robertson	54	Melbourne, Victoria	Business owner	New Zealand	Yes	Separated
8	Ashley Irvin	28	Brisbane, Queensland	Flight attendant	Broome, Western Australia	No	Separated
8	Troy Delmege	35	Sydney, New South Wales	IT accounts manager	Broome, Western Australia	No	Separated
9	Gabrielle Bartlett	44	Sydney, New South Wales	Marketing coordinator/plus-size model	Samoa	Broke up before final decision	Separated
9	Nasser Sultan	50	Sydney, New South Wales	Fitness instructor	Samoa	Broke up before final decision	Separated
10	Carly Bowyer	32	Melbourne, Victoria	Marketing manager	Vanuatu	Broke up before final decision	Separated
10	Justin Fischer	41	Sydney, New South Wales	Entrepreneur	Vanuatu	Broke up before final decision	Separated
11	Blair Rachael	31	Sydney, New South Wales	Executive assistant	New Zealand	Broke up before final decision	Separated
11	Sean Thomsen	34	Perth, Western Australia	Railway technician	New Zealand	Broke up before final decision	Separated

== Commitment ceremony history ==
Episode:	9	13	17	21	25	29/30
Ceremony:	1	2	3	4	5	Final Decision
Sarah	Stay	Stay	Stay	Stay	Stay	Yes
Telv	Stay	Stay	Stay	Stay	Stay	Yes
Charlene	Stay	Stay	Stay	Stay	Stay	Yes
Patrick	Stay	Stay	Stay	Stay	Stay	Yes
Melissa	Stay	Stay	Stay	Stay	Stay	Yes
John	Stay	Stay	Stay	Stay	Stay	Yes
Tracey	Stay	Stay	Stay	Stay	Stay	No
Dean	Leave	Stay	Stay	Stay	Stay	Yes
Ashley	Stay	Stay	Stay	Stay	Stay	No
Troy	Stay	Stay	Stay	Stay	Stay	No
Gabrielle	Stay	Stay	Leave	Stay	Leave	Left
Nasser	Stay	Stay	Stay	Leave	Leave	Left
Carly	Stay	Leave	Stay	Stay	Leave	Left
Justin	Stay	Stay	Stay	Stay	Leave	Left
Blair	Stay	Stay	Stay	Left		
Sean	Stay	Stay	Leave	Left		
Davina	Stay	Leave	Leave	Left		
Ryan	Stay	Stay	Leave	Left		
Jo	Stay	Leave	Left			
Sean	Leave	Leave	Left			
Alycia	Stay	Left				
Mathew	Stay	Left				
Notes	none	1	none	2, 3	none	
Left	none	Alycia & Mathew	Davina & Ryan	Blair & Sean	Carly & Justin	Tracey & Dean
Left	none	Jo & Sean	Davina & Ryan	Blair & Sean	Gabrielle & Nasser	Ashley & Troy

This couple left the experiment outside of commitment ceremony.
This couple elected to leave the experiment during the commitment ceremony.

- ^1: Mathew left the experiment on his own. Due to this, Alycia also had to leave the experiment.
- ^2: Sean left the experiment on his own. Due to this, Blair also had to leave the experiment.
- ^3: Melissa was unable to attend the commitment ceremony due to the birth of her granddaughter. She chose to stay via text message.

== Controversy ==
Contestants Dean Wells and Davina Rankin were involved in a cheating scandal that blindsided their respective partners, Tracey Jewel and Ryan Gallagher. Dean and Davina had planned to write "leave" at the commitment ceremony, but instead Dean chose to stay with Tracey and deny any wrongdoing when Davina called out his lies over their affair. Dean further infuriated fans when during a "boy's night" he led a conversation on wife swapping and asked the other grooms if any of their wives' mothers were attractive.

== Ratings ==
No.	Title	Air date	Timeslot	Overnight ratings		Consolidated ratings		Total viewers	Ref(s)
No.	Title	Air date	Timeslot	Viewers	Rank	Viewers	Rank	Total viewers	Ref(s)
1	Episode 1	29 January 2018	Monday 7:30pm	912,000	7	102,000	5	1,014,000	
2	Episode 2	30 January 2018	Tuesday 7:30pm	907,000	5	101,000	4	1,008,000	
3	Episode 3	31 January 2018	Wednesday 7:30pm	929,000	4	81,000	2	1,010,000	
4	Episode 4	1 February 2018	Thursday 7:30pm	995,000	1	96,000	1	1,091,000	
5	Episode 5	4 February 2018	Sunday 7:00pm	835,000	5	102,000	4	937,000	
6	Episode 6	5 February 2018	Monday 7:30pm	879,000	6	101,000	4	978,000	
7	Episode 7	6 February 2018	Tuesday 7:30pm	899,000	7	130,000	3	1,029,000	
8	Episode 8	8 February 2018	Thursday 7:30pm	938,000	1	124,000	1	1,062,000	
9	Episode 9	11 February 2018	Sunday 7:00pm	1,163,000	1	76,000	2	1,239,000	
10	Episode 10	12 February 2018	Monday 7:30pm	1,158,000	1	89,000	2	1,247,000	
11	Episode 11	13 February 2018	Tuesday 7:30pm	1,057,000	1	91,000	2	1,148,000	
12	Episode 12	14 February 2018	Wednesday 7:30pm	1,133,000	1	107,000	1	1,240,000	
13	Episode 13	18 February 2018	Sunday 7:00pm	1,351,000	1	101,000	1	1,452,000	
14	Episode 14	19 February 2018	Monday 7:30pm	1,296,000	1	104,000	1	1,400,000	
15	Episode 15	20 February 2018	Tuesday 7:30pm	1,233,000	1	104,000	1	1,337,000	
16	Episode 16	21 February 2018	Wednesday 7:30pm	1,341,000	1	132,000	1	1,473,000	
17	Episode 17	25 February 2018	Sunday 7:00pm	1,536,000	1	92,000	1	1,628,000	
18	Episode 18	26 February 2018	Monday 7:30pm	1,325,000	1	107,000	1	1,432,000	
19	Episode 19	27 February 2018	Tuesday 7:30pm	1,253,000	1	102,000	1	1,355,000	
20	Episode 20	28 February 2018	Wednesday 7:30pm	1,315,000	1	127,000	1	1,442,000	
21	Episode 21	4 March 2018	Sunday 7:30pm	1,535,000	1	108,000	1	1,643,000	
22	Episode 22	5 March 2018	Monday 7:30pm	1,271,000	1	98,000	1	1,369,000	
23	Episode 23	6 March 2018	Tuesday 7:30pm	1,267,000	1	119,000	1	1,386,000	
24	Episode 24	7 March 2018	Wednesday 7:30pm	1,260,000	1	112,000	1	1,372,000	
25	Episode 25	11 March 2018	Sunday 7:00pm	1,342,000	1	107,000	1	1,429,000	
26	Episode 26	12 March 2018	Monday 7:30pm	1,256,000	1	102,000	1	1,358,000	
27	Episode 27	13 March 2018	Tuesday 7:30pm	1,230,000	1	103,000	1	1,333,000	
28	Episode 28	14 March 2018	Wednesday 7:30pm	1,188,000	1	132,000	1	1,320,000	
29	Final Vows Part 1	18 March 2018	Sunday 7:00pm	1,446,000	1	76,000	1	1,522,000	
30	Final Vows Part 2	19 March 2018	Monday 7:30pm	1,525,000	1	78,000	1	1,603,000	
31	Reunion Dinner Party	20 March 2018	Tuesday 7:30pm	1,623,000	1	127,000	1	1,750,000	
32	Reunion Finale	21 March 2018	Wednesday 7:30pm	1,753,000	1	136,000	1	1,889,000	
