= Married at First Sight (Australian TV series) =

Reality television series

- Genre: Reality television
- Directed by: Ryan Potter
- Starring: John Aiken; Sabina Read; Trisha Stratford; Mel Schilling; Alessandra Rampolla; Marryam Chehelnabi
- Narrated by: Georgie Gardner; Helen Dallimore
- Country of origin: Australia
- Original language: English
- No. of seasons: 13
- No. of episodes: 383

Production
- Executive producers: Tara McWilliams; Kate Feely; John Walsh
- Production locations: Sydney, New South Wales
- Running time: 60–90 minutes
- Production company: Endemol Shine Australia

Original release
- Network: Nine Network
- Release: 18 May 2015 – present

Married at First Sight is an Australian reality television adaptation of the Danish series Gift ved første blik. The show features a group of strangers who participate in a social experiment and are paired together by experts. Due to the legal requirement to give one month's notice of marriage in Australia, participants in this installment are not legally married, instead proceeding with an unofficial commitment ceremony. The series first premiered on 18 May 2015 on the Nine Network. The show has had thirteen seasons between 2015 and 2026, plus a two-part reunion special which was broadcast before the eighth season in 2021.

== Premise ==
Couples meet for the first time at the altar, before spending their "wedding night" in a hotel and then embarking on a honeymoon. Upon return, they live together for a period of time and each week decide whether they will continue their relationship at a commitment ceremony where they can choose to either stay or leave. Those who stay make their final decision during the final vows. The experts encourage contestants to fully immerse themselves within all stages of the experiment which focuses on relationship building and companionship.

== Production ==
In November 2013, the series was originally announced to air in 2014, however was later delayed to the following year and premiered on 18 May 2015, with experts John Aiken, Sabina Read and Trisha Stratford. Following the series premiere, the series was immediately renewed for a second season after a strong debut in its timeslot. Mel Schilling replaced Read as an expert starting from the second season and left in 2026, due to being diagnosed with terminal cancer. In March 2026, Schilling died at the age of 54. Alessandra Rampolla replaced Stratford as an expert starting from the eighth season. It was narrated by Georgie Gardner from 2015 to 2017 for the first four seasons. Since 2018, Helen Dallimore has replaced Gardner as series narrator since the fifth season. In September 2026, Marryam Chehelnabi was announced as Shilling’s replacement.

== Series overview ==
Season	Episodes	Originally aired	
Season	Episodes	Season premiere	Season finale
1	6	18 May 2015	22 June 2015
2	7	4 April 2016	27 April 2016
3	8	29 August 2016	13 September 2016
4	29	30 January 2017	3 April 2017
5	32	29 January 2018	21 March 2018
6	41	28 January 2019	8 April 2019
7	36	3 February 2020	5 April 2020
GR	2	31 January 2021	1 February 2021
8	32	22 February 2021	18 April 2021
9	37	31 January 2022	4 April 2022
10	36	30 January 2023	3 April 2023
11	38	29 January 2024	15 April 2024
12	40	27 January 2025	7 April 2025
13	39	2 February 2026	13 April 2026

== Timeline of narrators and experts ==
Cast	Seasons													
Cast	1	2	3	4	5	6	7	GR	8	9	10	11	12	13
Narrators
Georgie Gardner	Narrator	Narrator	Narrator	Narrator										
Helen Dallimore					Narrator	Narrator	Narrator		Narrator	Narrator	Narrator	Narrator	Narrator	Narrator
Experts
John Aiken	Expert	Expert	Expert	Expert	Expert	Expert	Expert	Expert	Expert	Expert	Expert	Expert	Expert	Expert
Sabina Read	Expert													
Trisha Stratford	Expert	Expert	Expert	Expert	Expert	Expert	Expert							
Mel Schilling		Expert	Expert	Expert	Expert	Expert	Expert	Expert	Expert	Expert	Expert	Expert	Expert	Expert
Alessandra Rampolla									Expert	Expert	Expert	Expert	Expert	Expert

== Season 1 (2015) ==
In the first episode, two couples (Michael & Roni, Clare & Lachlan) met and wed in Melbourne and Sydney respectively. In the second episode, another two couples (Zoe & Alex, Michelle & James) met and wed in Melbourne and Sydney.

The Nine Network announced on 26 June 2015 that Lachlan would participate in the network's upcoming revival of The Farmer Wants a Wife.

=== Couple profiles ===
No.	Couple	Age	Home	Occupation	Honeymoon	Final Decision	Status
1	Clare Tamas	37	Sydney, New South Wales	Marketing manager	Gold Coast, Queensland	Yes	Separated
1	Lachlan McAleer	36	Sydney, New South Wales	Farmer	Gold Coast, Queensland	Yes	Separated
2	Roni Azzopardi	32	Melbourne, Victoria	Payroll manager	Wanaka, New Zealand	Broke up before final decision	Separated
2	Michael O'Dea	31	Melbourne, Victoria	Event manager	Wanaka, New Zealand	Broke up before final decision	Separated
3	Zoe Hendrix	25	Melbourne, Victoria	Digital marketing executive	Whitsunday Islands	Yes	Separated with child
3	Alex Garner	29	Melbourne, Victoria	Plumber	Whitsunday Islands	Yes	Separated with child
4	Michelle Worsley	34	Sydney, New South Wales	Communications manager	Darwin, Northern Territory	Yes	Separated
4	James Webster	36	Sydney, New South Wales	Sign writer	Darwin, Northern Territory	Yes	Separated

== Season 2 (2016) ==
In the first episode, two couples (Erin & Bryce, Christie & Mark) met and wed in Melbourne and Sydney. In the second episode, another two couples (Clare & Jono, Simone & Xavier) met and wed in Melbourne and Sydney respectively.

=== Couple profiles ===
No.	Couple	Age	Home	Occupation	Honeymoon	Final Decision	Status
1	Erin Bateman	26	Melbourne, Victoria	Retail Manager	Palm Cove, Queensland	Yes	Separated
1	Bryce Mohr	31	Melbourne, Victoria	Business analyst	Palm Cove, Queensland	Yes	Separated
2	Christie Jordee	39	Sydney, New South Wales	Business Owner	New Caledonia	Yes	Separated
2	Mark Hughes	36	Gippsland, Victoria	Farmer	New Caledonia	Yes	Separated
3	Clare Verrall	32	Melbourne, Victoria	Recruitment Consultant	Northern Territory	Broke up before final decision	Separated
3	Jono Pitman	28	Melbourne, Victoria	Tradie	Northern Territory	Broke up before final decision	Separated
4	Simone Lee Brennan	29	Sydney, New South Wales	Make-up artist	Fiji	No	Separated
4	Xavier Forsberg	26	Sydney, New South Wales	Sales manager	Fiji	No	Separated

== Season 3 (2016) ==
Season 3 was the first to feature five couples, including the series' first same sex couple. In the first episode, two couples (Nicole & Keller, Monica & Mark) met and wed in Brisbane and Sydney. In the second episode, another two couples (Jess & Dave, Bella & Michael) met and wed in Sydney and Brisbane. In the third episode, the last couple (Craig & Andy, same sex couple) met and wed in New Zealand.

=== Couple profiles ===
No.	Couple	Age	Home	Occupation	Honeymoon	Final Decision	Status
1	Nicole Heir	28	Gold Coast, Queensland	Teacher	Cook Islands	Yes	Separated
1	Craig Keller	26	Brisbane, Queensland	Mechanical fitter	Cook Islands	Yes	Separated
2	Monica Vanderkley	28	Sydney, New South Wales	Project manager	Lord Howe Island	Yes	Separated
2	Mark Ellam	30	Sydney, New South Wales	Firefighter	Lord Howe Island	Yes	Separated
3	Jess Wardrop	31	Sydney, New South Wales	Bank officer	Byron Bay, New South Wales	Broke up before final decision	Separated
3	Dave Crisp	28	Melbourne, Victoria	Account manager	Byron Bay, New South Wales	Broke up before final decision	Separated
4	Bella Frizza	30	Gold Coast, Queensland	Radio announcer	Port Douglas, Queensland	Yes	Separated
4	Michael Hughes	32	Brisbane, Queensland	Fashion accessories designer	Port Douglas, Queensland	Yes	Separated
5	Craig Roach	41	Gold Coast, Queensland	Hairdresser	Queenstown, New Zealand	Broke up before final decision	Separated
5	Andy Ankers	41	Sydney, New South Wales	Global account director	Queenstown, New Zealand	Broke up before final decision	Separated

== Season 4 (2017) ==
In the first episode, two couples (Cheryl & Jonathan, Susan & Sean) met and wed in Sydney and Melbourne. In the second episode, another two couples (Scarlett & Michael, Nadia & Anthony) met and wed in Sydney. In the third episode, two more couples (Alene & Simon, Vanessa & Andy) met and wed in Sydney and Melbourne respectively. In the fourth episode, another two couples (Lauren & Andrew, Deborah & John) met and wed in Sydney. In the fifth episode, the final two couples, two of whom were twins, were all married in the same ceremony in Perth. (Michelle & Jesse, Sharon & Nick). In the ninth episode, two previous contestants were matched up (Andrew & Cheryl).

== Season 5 (2018) ==
In the first episode, the first two couples (Tracey & Dean, Sarah & Telv) met and wed in Sydney and Melbourne. In the second episode, another two couples (Jo & Sean, Alycia & Mat) met and wed in Sydney and Melbourne. In the third episode, two more couples (Davina & Ryan, Charlene & Patrick) met and wed in Warrawong and Melbourne. In the fifth episode, two additional couples—Ashley and Troy, and Melissa and John (the latter a returning groom from season 4)—met and married in the Gold Coast and Melbourne. In the sixth episode, another two couples (Gabrielle & Nasser, Carly & Justin) met and wed in Sydney. In the seventh episode, the final couple (Blair & Sean) met and wed in Sydney.

== Season 6 (2019) ==
In the first episode, two couples (Jules & Cameron, Cyrell & Nic) met and wed in Sydney. In the second episode, two more couples (Jessika & Mick, Melissa & Dino) met and wed in Byron Bay and Hawkesbury River, both in New South Wales. In the third episode, another two couples (Heidi & Mike, Ning & Mark) met and wed in Byron Bay and Melbourne. In the fifth episode, two more couples (Lauren & Matthew, Elizabeth & Sam) met and wed in Byron Bay and Hawkesbury River. In the sixth episode, the two couples (Ines & Bronson, Martha & Michael) met and wed in Byron Bay and Melbourne. In the 18th episode, the final two new couples (Susie & Billy, Tamara & Dan) met and wed in Sydney.

The experts had to decide on a controversial request by Dan and Jess who wanted to leave their respective "spouses" but remain in the experiment as a couple. The experts allowed the couple to leave their previous matches and stay in the experiment as a new couple.

== Season 7 (2020) ==
In the first episode, the first two couples (Poppy & Luke, Cathy & Josh) met and wed in Bilpin and Wyong Creek, both in New South Wales. In the second episode, another two couples (Natasha & Mikey, Amanda & Tash, same sex couple) met and wed in Stanwell Tops and Melbourne. In the third episode, another two couples (Hayley & David, Vanessa & Chris) met and wed in Melbourne and Sydney. In the fifth episode, two more couples (Connie & Jonethen, Aleks & Ivan) met and wed in Melbourne and Sydney. In the sixth episode, two couples (Mishel & Steve, Stacey & Michael) met and wed in Melbourne. In the 18th episode, the final two new couples (Elizabeth & Seb, KC & Drew) met and wed in Sydney and Central Coast.

== Grand Reunion special (2021) ==
After Season 8 was delayed by three weeks due to a delayed Australian Open, the Nine Network commissioned a two part reunion special to fill the programming gap. Part 1 centered around a dinner party, whereas Part 2 focused on experts John Aiken and Mel Schilling catching up with each participant, where they reflected on their lives following their time in the experiment.

Part 1 aired on 31 January 2021. Part 2 was scheduled to air on 7 February 2021, however was brought forward to 1 February 2021, as counter-programming to the Seven Network's premiere of Holey Moley.

=== Participants ===
Participant	Season
Dean Wells	Season 5
Tracey Jewel	Season 5
Cyrell Paule	Season 6
Ines Bašić	Season 6
Jessika Power	Season 6
Martha Kalifatidis	Season 6
Michael Brunelli	Season 6
Sarah Roza	Season 5
Nasser Sultan	Season 5
Troy Delmege	Season 5
Ashley Irvin	Season 5
Mike Gunner	Season 6
Charlene Perera	Season 5
Jo McPharlin	Season 5
Ryan Gallagher	Season 5
Elizabeth Sobinoff	Season 6 & 7
Sebastian Guilhaus	Season 7

== Season 8 (2021) ==
In the first episode, two couples (Melissa & Bryce, Rebecca & Jake) met and wed in Richmond and Hunter Valley, both in New South Wales. In the second episode, three more couples (Samantha & Cameron, Booka & Brett, Coco & Sam) met and wed in Sydney and Hunter Valley. In the third episode, another two couples (Alana & Jason, Joanne & James) met and wed in Sydney and Vaucluse. In the fifth episode, two more couples (Belinda & Patrick, Beth & Russell) met and wed in the Hunter Valley and Sydney. In the 14th episode, an additional two couples (Kerry & Johnny, Georgia & Liam) met and wed in Richmond and Helensburgh, both in New South Wales. In the 15th episode, the final couple (Jaimie & Chris) met and wed in Sydney.

== Season 9 (2022) ==
In the first episode, two couples (Selin & Anthony, Tamara & Brent) met and wed in Richmond and Sydney. In the second episode, two more couples (Domenica & Jack, Ella & Mitch) met and wed in Helensburgh and Sydney. In the third episode, another two couples (Holly & Andrew, Selina & Cody) met and wed in Sydney and Cattai, New South Wales. In the fifth episode, two more couples (Olivia & Jackson, Samantha & Al) met and wed in Sydney. In the 14th episode, an additional two couples (Kate & Matt, Carolina & Dion) met and wed in Sydney and Oatlands, New South Wales. In the 15th episode, the final couple (Jessica & Daniel) met and wed in Richmond, New South Wales.

== Season 10 (2023) ==
In the first episode, two couples (Lyndall & Cameron, Bronte & Harrison) met and wed in Byron Bay and Sydney. In the second episode, another two couples (Sandy & Dan, Claire & Jesse) met and wed in Sydney. In the third episode, two more couples (Tahnee & Ollie, Janelle & Adam) met and wed in Sydney and Byron Bay. In the fourth episode, another two couples (Caitlin & Shannon, Alyssa & Duncan) met and wed on the Gold Coast and in Byron Bay. In the fifth episode, two more couples (Melissa & Josh, Melinda & Layton) met and wed in Sydney. In the 14th episode, the final two couples (Tayla & Hugo, Evelyn & Rupert) met and wed in Sydney.

== Season 11 (2024) ==
In the first episode, two couples (Sara & Tim, Cassandra & Tristan) met and wed in Sydney. In the second episode, two couples (Lucinda & Timothy, Tori & Jack) met & wed in Gold Coast Hinterland and Sydney. In the third episode, two couples (Natalie & Collins, Eden & Jayden) met & wed in Sydney and Gold Coast. In the fourth episode, one couple (Ben & Ellie) met & wed in Sydney. In the fifth episode, two couples (Lauren & Jonathan, Andrea & Richard) met & wed in Gold Coast & Tamborine Mountain. In the 14th episode, two couples (Stephen & Michael, same sex couple and Madeleine & Ash) met & wed. In the 15th episode, the final couple (Jade & Ridge) met & wed in Sydney.

== Season 12 (2025) ==
In the first episode, two couples (Carina & Paul, Lauren & Eliot) met and wed in Sydney. In the second episode, two couples (Katie & Tim, Jamie & Dave) met and wed in Sydney and Berry. In the third episode, two couples (Awhina & Adrian, Sierah & Billy) met and wed. In the fourth episode, two couples (Ashleigh & Jake, Rhi & Jeff) met and wed. In the fifth episode, two couples (Morena & Tony, Jacqueline & Ryan) met and wed. In the 14th episode, one couple (Beth & Teejay) met and wed. In the 15th episode, a couple who left returned as separate bride and groom to form two new couples (Lauren & Clint, Veronica & Eliot) met and wed.

== Season 13 (2026) ==
In the first episode, two couples (Alissa & David, Rachel & Steven) met and wed. In the second episode, two couples (Melissa & Luke, Gia & Scott) met and wed. In the third episode, two couples (Bec & Danny, Brook & Chris) met and wed. In the fourth episode, one couple (Rebecca & Steve) met and wed. In the fifth episode, two couples (Stella & Filip, Julia & Grayson) met and wed. In the 14th episode, two couples (Juliette & Joel, Stephanie & Tyson) met & wed. In the 15th episode, the final couple (Chris & Sammy, same sex couple) met & wed. During the series a message of support for relationship expert Mel Schilling was given by John Aiken. Schilling died on 24 March 2026.

== Viewership ==
=== Season ratings ===
Ratings data for seasons 1-10 represents the same day average viewership from the 5 largest Australian metropolitan centres (Sydney, Melbourne, Brisbane, Perth and Adelaide). Season 11 onwards represents the national average viewership.

Season	Episodes	Originally aired		Preliminary		Consolidated	
Season	Episodes	Season premiere	Season finale	Average viewers	Average rank	Average viewers	Average rank
1	6	18 May 2015	22 June 2015	1.115	#4	1.195	#3
2	7	4 April 2016	27 April 2016	0.915	#7	0.999	#6
3	8	29 August 2016	13 September 2016	0.880	#7	0.970	#5
4	29	30 January 2017	3 April 2017	1.081	#3	1.186	#2
5	32	29 January 2018	21 March 2018	1.223	#1	1.328	#1
6	41	28 January 2019	8 April 2019	1.323	#1	1.432	#1
7	36	3 February 2020	5 April 2020	1.102	#2	1.215	#1
GR	2	31 January 2021	1 February 2021	0.824	#6	0.980	#4
8	32	22 February 2021	18 April 2021	1.021	#2	1.121	#1
9	37	31 January 2022	4 April 2022	0.946	#3	1.045	#1
10	36	30 January 2023	3 April 2023	0.878	#2	—N/a	#1
11	38	29 January 2024	8 April 2024	1.513	#1	—N/a	#1
12	40	27 January 2025	7 April 2025	1.751	#1	—N/a	#1
13	39	2 February 2026	13 April 2026	1.837	#1	—N/a	#1

=== Season 1 (2015) ===
No.	Title	Air date	Overnight ratings		Consolidated ratings		Total viewers	Ref(s)
No.	Title	Air date	Viewers	Rank	Viewers	Rank	Total viewers	Ref(s)
1	Episode 1	18 May 2015	1,134,000	5	65,000	2	1,199,000	
2	Episode 2	25 May 2015	1,103,000	4	77,000	2	1,180,000	
3	Episode 3	1 June 2015	1,116,000	3	84,000	3	1,200,000	
4	Episode 4	8 June 2015	971,000	7	99,000	6	1,070,000	
5	Episode 5	15 June 2015	1,079,000	3	85,000	2	1,164,000	
6	Episode 6	22 June 2015	1,290,000	1	71,000	1	1,361,000	

=== Season 2 (2016) ===
No.	Title	Air date	Overnight ratings		Consolidated ratings		Total viewers	Ref(s)
No.	Title	Air date	Viewers	Rank	Viewers	Rank	Total viewers	Ref(s)
1	Episode 1	4 April 2016	771,000	13	86,000	9	857,000	
2	Episode 2	5 April 2016	905,000	6	91,000	5	996,000	
3	Episode 3	11 April 2016	874,000	8	62,000	7	936,000	
4	Episode 4	12 April 2016	880,000	8	85,000	6	965,000	
5	Episode 5	18 April 2016	899,000	6	122,000	7	1,021,000	
6	Episode 6	19 April 2016	831,000	9	93,000	8	924,000	
7	Finale Follow Up	27 April 2016	1,048,000 1,110,000	4 1	66,000 66,000	2 1	1,114,000 1,176,000	

=== Season 3 (2016) ===
No.	Title	Air date	Overnight ratings		Consolidated ratings		Total viewers	Ref(s)
No.	Title	Air date	Viewers	Rank	Viewers	Rank	Total viewers	Ref(s)
1	Episode 1	29 August 2016	805,000	11	74,000	7	879,000	
2	Episode 2	30 August 2016	810,000	7	60,000	7	870,000	
3	Episode 3	31 August 2016	788,000	9	79,000	7	867,000	
4	Episode 4	5 September 2016	843,000	8	97,000	6	940,000	
5	Episode 5	6 September 2016	919,000	5	93,000	4	1,012,000	
6	Episode 6	7 September 2016	974,000	2	117,000	1	1,091,000	
7	Episode 7	12 September 2016	814,000	9	100,000	8	914,000	
8	Episode 8	13 September 2016	1,083,000	3	101,000	1	1,184,000	

=== Grand Reunion special (2021) ===
No.	Title	Air date	Overnight ratings		Consolidated ratings		Total viewers	Ref(s)
No.	Title	Air date	Viewers	Rank	Viewers	Rank	Total viewers	Ref(s)
1	Part 1	31 January 2021	866,000	4	165,000	1	1,031,000	
2	Part 2	1 February 2021	781,000	7	148,000	6	929,000	

== Awards and nominations ==
Year	Award	Category	Nominee	Result
2018	Logie Awards	Most Popular Reality Program	Married At First Sight Season 5	Nominated
2019	Logie Awards	Most Popular Reality Program	Married At First Sight Season 6	Nominated
2019	Logie Awards	Most Outstanding Reality Program	Married At First Sight Season 6	Nominated
2022	Logie Awards	Most Popular New Talent	Alessandra Rampolla	Nominated
2022	Logie Awards	Most Popular Reality Program	Married At First Sight Season 9	Nominated
2023	Logie Awards	Most Popular Reality Program	Married At First Sight Season 10	Nominated
2023	Logie Awards	Most Outstanding Reality Program	Married At First Sight Season 10	Nominated
2024	Logie Awards	Best Structured Reality Program	Married At First Sight Season 11	Nominated
2025	Logie Awards	Best Structured Reality Program	Married At First Sight Season 12	Nominated

== Controversy and legality ==
Before the first season went to air, an online petition calling for the series to be axed attracted over 15,000 signatures.

Contestants have also criticised the show, such as second season participant Simone Lee Brennan described the program as "never [being] portrayed to its full authenticity," suggesting the man she had been paired with, Xavier Forsberg, had been recruited by producers and was seeking a sports-presenting role rather than a relationship.

At the show's commitment ceremonies, each contestant chooses to remain in the production or withdraw, the latter of which the contestant's partner must agree to mutually. This has been criticised as sending "the worst possible message" to people who may be in a toxic relationship. Due to interpersonal complexities in Season 10, contestants Caitlin McConville and Josh White were permitted to withdraw without input from their respective partners.

Some of the contestants of the show have also spoken out against the program claiming it to be fake, including Dean Wells from Season 5. Other former contestants have been abused in the street, received death threats online, attempted suicide, or been taken to a psychiatric hospital.

== International broadcast ==
In the Netherlands the show is called Married at First Sight and is broadcast at primetime on RTL 4.

In Belgium, the show is broadcast as Blind getrouwd - Australië and runs every weekday on the Flemish channel VTM 2. The parent network VTM also produces and runs an own installment of the format, called Blind getrouwd ("Married in blind faith") and which features Flemish couples.

In Spain, the show is broadcast as Casados a ciegas and runs every weekday from 6:15 pm for three hours each day on TEN.

In the United Kingdom, in 2020, E4 aired the fourth series (2017), following this the fifth series (2018) was aired and then in early 2021, the sixth series (2019) was broadcast on the channel. By 2021 the series had become a hit with British audiences, earning a number of celebrity fans that included Sam Smith, Michael Ball, and Duncan James.

In New Zealand, the show is broadcast on Three and screens four nights per week.

In Croatia, the show is broadcast on the VOD platform Voyo.

In the United States, the show is broadcast on cable network Lifetime on Wednesdays and Thursdays at 9pm ET/PT.

In Poland, the show is broadcast on a VOD platform Player.pl.
