= Married at First Sight (Australian TV series) season 12 =

Married at First Sight
- Season 12
- No. of episodes: 40

Release
- Original network: Nine Network
- Original release: 27 January – 7 April 2025

Season chronology
- ← Previous; Season 11 Next → Season 13

The twelfth season of Married at First Sight premiered on 27 January 2025 on the Nine Network. Relationship advisors John Aiken and Mel Schilling, alongside sexologist Alessandra Rampolla, all returned to match ten brides and ten grooms. Halfway through the experiment, the experts matched another three brides and three grooms together, including couple number 2 who had exited, returned as separate bride and groom to form two new couples.

== Couple profiles ==
No.	Couple	Age	Home	Occupation	Honeymoon	Final Decision	Status
1	Carina Mirabile	31	Perth, Western Australia	Digital marketing manager	Iririki Island Resort, Vanuatu	No	Separated
1	Paul Antoine	30	Perth, Western Australia	Wellness advisor	Iririki Island Resort, Vanuatu	No	Separated
2	Lauren Hall	37	Brisbane, Queensland	Business owner	Kingfisher Bay Resort, K'gari, Queensland	Broke up before final decision	Separated
2	Eliot Donovan	35	Gold Coast, Queensland	Business owner	Kingfisher Bay Resort, K'gari, Queensland	Broke up before final decision	Separated
3	Katie Johnston (Note: Surname erroneously displayed on certain websites as Johnstone, or Johnson.)	37	Eumundi, Queensland	Restaurant CEO	Cradle Mountain Resort, Tasmania	Broke up before final decision	Separated
3	Tim Gromie	38	Melbourne, Victoria	Primary school teacher	Cradle Mountain Resort, Tasmania	Broke up before final decision	Separated
4	Jamie Marinos	28	Melbourne, Victoria	Account manager	Daydream Island, Whitsundays, Queensland	Yes	Separated
4	David 'Dave' Hand	36	Melbourne, Victoria	Builder	Daydream Island, Whitsundays, Queensland	Yes	Separated
5	Awhina Rutene	30	Perth, Western Australia	Aged care worker	Sofitel Fiji Resort and Spa, Denarau Island, Fiji	Yes	Separated
5	Adrian Araouzou	30	Sydney, NSW	Online business owner	Sofitel Fiji Resort and Spa, Denarau Island, Fiji	Yes	Separated
6	Sierah Swepstone	31	Melbourne, Victoria	Financial Planner	Perisher Valley, NSW	Broke up before final decision	Separated
6	Billy Belcher	31	Perth, Western Australia	Plasterer	Perisher Valley, NSW	Broke up before final decision	Separated
7	Ashleigh Ackerman	34	Gold Coast, Queensland	Dance studio owner	Novotel Sunshine Coast, Queensland	Broke up before final decision	Separated
7	Jake Luik	30	Perth, Western Australia	Teacher	Novotel Sunshine Coast, Queensland	Broke up before final decision	Separated
8	Rhiannon 'Rhi' Dišljenković	34	Melbourne, Victoria	Account manager	Imperial Hotel, Gold Coast, Queensland	Yes	Separated
8	Jeffrey 'Jeff' Gobbels	39	Melbourne, Victoria	Electrician	Imperial Hotel, Gold Coast, Queensland	Yes	Separated
9	Morena Farina	57	Melbourne, Victoria	Fitness instructor	Pullman Magenta Shores Resort, Central Coast, NSW	Broke up before final decision	Separated
9	Tony Mojanovski	53	Wollongong, NSW	Charter boat captain	Pullman Magenta Shores Resort, Central Coast, NSW	Broke up before final decision	Separated
10	Jacqueline 'Jacqui' Burfoot	29	Sydney, NSW	Consultant	Mount Lofty House Estate, Adelaide Hills, South Australia	No	Separated
10	Ryan Donnelly	36	Sydney, NSW	Project manager	Mount Lofty House Estate, Adelaide Hills, South Australia	No	Separated
11	Beth Kelly	28	Brisbane, Queensland	Hair salon manager	The Elandra Resort, Mission Beach, Far North Queensland	Broke up before final decision	Separated
11	Teejay Halkias	28	Brisbane, Queensland	Wedding model, actor	The Elandra Resort, Mission Beach, Far North Queensland	Broke up before final decision	Separated
12	Lauren Hall (#2)	37	Brisbane, Queensland	Business owner	Oakes Cypress Lakes Resort, Hunter Valley, NSW	Broke up before final decision	Separated
12	Clint Rice	43	Launceston, Tasmania	Pro golfer, business owner	Oakes Cypress Lakes Resort, Hunter Valley, NSW	Broke up before final decision	Separated
13	Veronica Cloherty	32	Sydney, NSW	Actor, fitness instructor	Mudgee Retreats, NSW	Broke up before final decision	Separated
13	Eliot Donovan (#2)	35	Gold Coast, Queensland	Business owner	Mudgee Retreats, NSW	Broke up before final decision	Separated

== Commitment ceremony history ==
Episode:	9	13	17	21	25	29	33	37/38
Ceremony:	1	2	3	4	5	6	7	Final decision
Jamie	Stay	Stay	Stay	Stay	Stay	Stay	Stay	Yes
Dave	Stay	Stay	Stay	Stay	Stay	Stay	Stay	Yes
Awhina	Stay	Stay	Leave	Stay	Stay	Stay	Stay	Yes
Adrian	Stay	Stay	Stay	Stay	Stay	Stay	Stay	Yes
Rhi	Stay	Stay	Stay	Stay	Stay	Stay	Stay	Yes
Jeff	Stay	Stay	Stay	Stay	Stay	Stay	Stay	Yes
Carina	Stay	Stay	Stay	Stay	Stay	Stay	Stay	No
Paul	Stay	Stay	Stay	Stay	Stay	Stay	Stay	Yes
Jacqueline	Stay	Stay	Stay	Stay	Stay	Stay	Stay	No
Ryan	Stay	Stay	Stay	Stay	Stay	Stay	Leave	No
Beth	Not in experiment		Stay	Stay	Stay	Stay	Stay	Left
Teejay	Not in experiment		Stay	Stay	Stay	Stay	Leave	Left
Veronica	Not in experiment		Stay	Stay	Stay	Leave	Left	
Eliot	Not in experiment		Stay	Stay	Stay	Leave	Left	
Lauren	Not in experiment		Stay	Stay	Leave	Left		
Clint	Not in experiment		Stay	Stay	Leave	Left		
Morena	Stay	Leave	Stay	Leave	Left			
Tony	Stay	Stay	Stay	Leave	Left			
Sierah	Stay	Stay	Leave	Left				
Billy	Stay	Stay	Leave	Left				
Ashleigh	Stay	Left						
Jake	Leave	Left						
Katie	Leave	Left						
Tim	Leave	Left						
Lauren	Left							
Eliot	Left							
Notes	1	2	3	none				4, 5
Left	Lauren & Eliot	Ashleigh & Jake	Sierah & Billy	Morena & Tony	Lauren & Clint	Veronica & Eliot	none	Beth & Teejay
Left	Lauren & Eliot	Ashleigh & Jake	Sierah & Billy	Morena & Tony	Lauren & Clint	Veronica & Eliot	none	Carina & Paul
Left	Katie & Tim	Ashleigh & Jake	Sierah & Billy	Morena & Tony	Lauren & Clint	Veronica & Eliot	none	Jacqueline & Ryan

This couple left the experiment outside of commitment ceremony.
This couple elected to leave the experiment during the commitment ceremony.

- ^1: Eliot left the experiment on his own. Due to this, Lauren also had to leave the experiment.
- ^2: Jake left the experiment on his own. Due to this, Ashleigh also had to leave the experiment.
- ^3: Three new couples were introduced into the experiment including Lauren and Eliot who had exited, returned as separate bride and groom to form two new couples.
- ^4: Beth decided to leave the experiment before the final vows. Due to this, Teejay also had to leave the experiment.
- ^5: Awhina and Adrian originally decided to leave at the final vows, but changed their minds to stay after hearing each other's vows.

=== Partner swap week ===
No.	Couple	Swapped with
1	Carina	Awhina
1	Paul	Remained at apartment
2	Jamie	Veronica
2	Dave	Remained at apartment
3	Awhina	Jamie
3	Adrian	Remained at apartment
4	Rhi	Jacqueline
4	Jeff	Remained at apartment
5	Jacqueline	Beth
5	Ryan	Remained at apartment
6	Beth	Carina
6	Teejay	Remained at apartment
7	Veronica	Rhiannon
7	Eliot	Remained at apartment

== Ratings ==
No.	Title	Air date	Timeslot	National reach viewers	National total viewers	Night rank	Ref(s)
1	Marriage 1 & 2	27 January 2025	Monday 7:30 pm	2,523,000	1,353,000	2	
2	Marriage 3 & 4	28 January 2025	Tuesday 7:30 pm	2,662,000	1,484,000	1	
3	Marriage 5 & 6	29 January 2025	Wednesday 7:30 pm	2,548,000	1,497,000	1	
4	Marriage 7 & 8	30 January 2025	Thursday 7:30 pm	2,407,000	1,426,000	1	
5	Marriage 9 & 10	2 February 2025	Sunday 7:00 pm	2,909,000	1,620,000	1	
6	Honesty Week Part 1	3 February 2025	Monday 7:30 pm	2,817,000	1,779,000	1	
7	Honesty Week Part 2	4 February 2025	Tuesday 7:30 pm	2,704,000	1,674,000	1	
8	Dinner Party 1	5 February 2025	Wednesday 7:30 pm	2,727,000	1,639,000	1	
9	Commitment Ceremony 1	9 February 2025	Sunday 7:00 pm	3,063,000	1,929,000	1	
10	Intimacy Week Part 1	10 February 2025	Monday 7:30 pm	2,767,000	1,668,000	1	
11	Intimacy Week Part 2	11 February 2025	Tuesday 7:30 pm	2,624,000	1,673,000	1	
12	Dinner Party 2	12 February 2025	Wednesday 7:30 pm	2,867,000	1,756,000	1	
13	Commitment Ceremony 2	16 February 2025	Sunday 7:00 pm	2,979,000	1,808,000	1	
14	Marriage 11	17 February 2025	Monday 7:30 pm	2,726,000	1,748,000	1	
15	Marriage 12 & 13	18 February 2025	Tuesday 7:30 pm	2,812,000	1,747,000	1	
16	Dinner Party 3	19 February 2025	Wednesday 7:30 pm	2,865,000	1,803,000	1	
17	Commitment Ceremony 3	23 February 2025	Sunday 7:00 pm	3,308,000	2,012,000	1	
18	Family & Friends Week Part 1	24 February 2025	Monday 7:30 pm	2,961,000	1,833,000	1	
19	Family & Friends Week Part 2	25 February 2025	Tuesday 7:30 pm	2,799,000	1,791,000	1	
20	Dinner Party 4	26 February 2025	Wednesday 7:30 pm	2,814,000	1,817,000	1	
21	Commitment Ceremony 4	2 March 2025	Sunday 7:00 pm	3,265,000	2,024,000	1	
22	Couples Retreat Week Part 1	3 March 2025	Monday 7:30 pm	2,949,000	1,827,000	1	
23	Couples Retreat Week Part 2	4 March 2025	Tuesday 7:30 pm	2,772,000	1,742,000	1	
24	Dinner Party 5	5 March 2025	Wednesday 7:30 pm	2,822,000	1,837,000	1	
25	Commitment Ceremony 5	9 March 2025	Sunday 7:00 pm	3,229,000	1,843,000	1	
26	Partner Swap Week Part 1	10 March 2025	Monday 7:30 pm	2,843,000	1,728,000	1	
27	Partner Swap Week Part 2	11 March 2025	Tuesday 7:30 pm	2,841,000	1,710,000	1	
28	Dinner Party 6	12 March 2025	Wednesday 7:30 pm	2,840,000	1,766,000	1	
29	Commitment Ceremony 6	16 March 2025	Sunday 7:00 pm	3,215,000	1,926,000	1	
30	Homestay Part 1	17 March 2025	Monday 7:30 pm	2,741,000	1,746,000	1	
31	Homestay Part 2	18 March 2025	Tuesday 7:30 pm	2,710,000	1,636,000	1	
32	Dinner Party 7	19 March 2025	Wednesday 7:30 pm	2,789,000	1,718,000	1	
33	Commitment Ceremony 7	23 March 2025	Sunday 7:00 pm	3,009,000	1,839,000	1	
34	Final Test Week Part 1	24 March 2025	Monday 7:30 pm	2,827,000	1,767,000	1	
35	Final Test Week Part 2	25 March 2025	Tuesday 7:30 pm	2,729,000	1,815,000	1	
36	Dinner Party 8	26 March 2025	Wednesday 7:30 pm	2,813,000	1,763,000	1	
37	Final Vows Part 1	30 March 2025	Sunday 7:00 pm	3,069,000	1,816,000	1	
38	Final Vows Part 2	31 March 2025	Monday 7:30 pm	2,737,000	1,753,000	1	
39	Reunion Dinner Party	6 April 2025	Sunday 7:00 pm	3,099,000	1,894,000	1	
40	Reunion Finale	7 April 2025	Monday 7:30 pm	2,899,000	1,829,000	1	

== Notes ==
Jacqui Burfoot and Clint Rice started dating before the reunion. They are now still together and married.
