= Married at First Sight (Australian TV series) season 10 =

Married at First Sight
- Season 10
- No. of episodes: 36

Release
- Original network: Nine Network
- Original release: 30 January – 3 April 2023

Season chronology
- ← Previous; Season 9 Next → Season 11

The tenth season of Married at First Sight premiered on 30 January 2023 on the Nine Network. Relationship experts John Aiken and Mel Schilling, alongside sexologist Alessandra Rampolla all return to match ten brides and ten grooms. Halfway through the experiment, the experts matched another two brides and two grooms together.

== Couple Profiles ==
No.	Couple	Age	Home	Occupation	Honeymoon	Final Decision	Status
1	Lyndall Grace	27	Perth, Western Australia	Accountant	Fraser Island, Queensland	No	Separated
1	Cameron Woods	27	Darwin, Northern Territory	Carpenter	Fraser Island, Queensland	No	Separated
2	Bronte Schofield	28	Perth, Western Australia	Online Beauty Educator	Hunter Valley, New South Wales	Broke up before final decision	Separated
2	Harrison Boon	32	Sydney, New South Wales	Builder	Hunter Valley, New South Wales	Broke up before final decision	Separated
3	Sandy Jawanda	36	Melbourne, Victoria	Dental Hygienist	Singapore	Broke up before final decision	Separated
3	Dan Hunjas	42	Gold Coast, Queensland	Digital Marketing Business Owner	Singapore	Broke up before final decision	Separated
4	Claire Nomarhas	31	Melbourne, Victoria	Kindergarten Assistant	Whitsunday Islands, Queensland	Broke up before final decision	Separated
4	Jesse Burford	30	Perth, Western Australia	Marriage Celebrant	Whitsunday Islands, Queensland	Broke up before final decision	Separated
5	Tahnee Cook	27	Sydney, New South Wales	PR Manager	Fiji	Yes	Separated
5	Ollie Skelton	26	Perth, Western Australia	Voice Over Artist	Fiji	Yes	Separated
6	Janelle Han	28	Perth, Western Australia	Beauty Influencer	Cairns, Queensland	Broke up before final decision	Separated
6	Adam Seed	35	Queensland	Entrepreneur	Cairns, Queensland	Broke up before final decision	Separated
7	Caitlin McConville	27	Brisbane, Queensland	Makeup Artist	Gold Coast, Queensland	Broke up before final decision	Separated
7	Shannon Adams	30	Melbourne, Victoria	Personal Trainer/UberEATS driver	Gold Coast, Queensland	Broke up before final decision	Separated
8	Alyssa Barmonde	35	Sydney, New South Wales	Executive Assistant	Yarrawonga, Victoria	No	Separated
8	Duncan James	36	Sydney, New South Wales	Cyber Security Sales	Yarrawonga, Victoria	No	Separated
9	Layton Mills	35	Sydney, New South Wales	CEO, Biotech	Crowne Plaza, Hawkesbury River, New South Wales	Yes	Separated
9	Melinda Willis	32	Brisbane, Queensland	CEO, Fashion & Beauty	Crowne Plaza, Hawkesbury River, New South Wales	Yes	Separated
10	Melissa Sheppard	41	Sydney, New South Wales	Hairdresser	Club Wyndham, Denarau Island, Fiji	Broke up before final decision	Separated
10	Josh White	40	Sydney, New South Wales	Advertising Client Director	Club Wyndham, Denarau Island, Fiji	Broke up before final decision	Separated
11	Tayla Winter	27	Hobart, Tasmania	Nurse	Yarra Valley, VIC	Broke up before final decision	Separated
11	Hugo Armstrong	32	Sydney, New South Wales	IT Account Executive	Yarra Valley, VIC	Broke up before final decision	Separated
12	Evelyn Ellis	26	Sydney, New South Wales	Marketing Manager and Model	Shoalhaven, NSW	No	Separated
12	Rupert Bugden	27	Brisbane, Queensland	Electrician	Shoalhaven, NSW	No	Separated

== Commitment Ceremony History ==
Episode:	9	13	17	21	25	29	33/34
Ceremony:	1	2	3	4	5	6	Final Decision
Tahnee	Stay	Stay	Stay	Stay	Stay	Stay	Yes
Ollie	Stay	Stay	Stay	Stay	Stay	Stay	Yes
Melinda	Stay	Stay	Stay	Stay	Stay	Stay	Yes
Layton	Stay	Stay	Stay	Stay	Stay	Stay	Yes
Lyndall	Stay	Stay	Stay	Stay	Stay	Stay	No
Cameron	Stay	Stay	Stay	Stay	Stay	Stay	No
Evelyn	Not in Experiment		Stay	Stay	Stay	Stay	No
Rupert	Not in Experiment		Stay	Stay	Stay	Stay	No
Alyssa	Stay	Stay	Stay	Stay	Stay	Stay	Yes
Duncan	Stay	Stay	Stay	Stay	Stay	Stay	No
Bronte	Stay	Stay	Stay	Stay	Stay	Stay	Left
Harrison	Leave	Stay	Stay	Stay	Stay	Stay	Left
Claire	Stay	Stay	Stay	Stay	Leave	Left	
Jesse	Leave	Stay	Leave	Stay	Leave	Left	
Tayla	Not in Experiment		Stay	Leave	Left		
Hugo	Not in Experiment		Stay	Stay	Left		
Sandy	Stay	Stay	Stay	Leave	Left		
Dan	Stay	Stay	Stay	Leave	Left		
Janelle	Stay	Stay	Leave	Left			
Adam	Stay	Stay	Leave	Left			
Caitlin	Stay	Leave	Left				
Shannon	Stay	Stay	Left				
Melissa	Stay	Stay	Left				
Josh	Stay	Leave	Left				
Notes	none	1	2, 3	none	4	none	5
Left	none	Melissa & Josh	Janelle & Adam	Sandy & Dan	Tayla & Hugo	none	Bronte & Harrison
Left	none	Melissa & Josh	Janelle & Adam	Sandy & Dan	Tayla & Hugo	none	Alyssa & Duncan
Left	none	Caitlin & Shannon	Janelle & Adam	Sandy & Dan	Claire & Jesse	none	Evelyn & Rupert
Left	none	Caitlin & Shannon	Janelle & Adam	Sandy & Dan	Claire & Jesse	none	Lyndall & Cameron

This couple left the experiment outside of commitment ceremony.
This couple elected to leave the experiment during the commitment ceremony.

- ^1: The experts allowed Josh and Caitlin to leave the experiment even though their respective partners wrote "stay" due to their relationships breaking down beyond repair.
- ^2: Two new couples were introduced into the experiment.
- ^3: Bronte was not able to attend the commitment ceremony due to illness, however she did write "stay" on a card that Harrison presented.
- ^4: Tayla & Hugo decided to leave the experiment separately at the fifth dinner party.
- ^5: Bronte decided to leave the experiment at the seventh dinner party. Due to this, Harrison also had to leave the experiment.

=== Partner swap week ===
No.	Couple	Swapped with
1	Lyndall	Alyssa
1	Cameron	Remained at apartment
2	Bronte	Remained at apartment
2	Harrison	Layton
3	Tahnee	Lyndall
3	Ollie	Remained at apartment
4	Alyssa	Evelyn
4	Duncan	Remained at apartment
5	Melinda	Remained at apartment
5	Layton	Harrison
6	Evelyn	Tahnee
6	Rupert	Remained at apartment

== Ratings ==
No.	Title	Air date	Timeslot	Overnight ratings		Consolidated ratings		Total viewers	Ref(s)
No.	Title	Air date	Timeslot	Viewers	Rank	Viewers	Rank	Total viewers	Ref(s)
1	Episode 1	30 January 2023	Monday 7:30pm	840,000	3	143,000	1	983,000	
2	Episode 2	31 January 2023	Tuesday 7:30pm	796,000	3	143,000	1	939,000	
3	Episode 3	1 February 2023	Wednesday 7:30pm	790,000	3	133,000	1	923,000	
4	Episode 4	2 February 2023	Thursday 7:30pm	704,000	3	162,000	1	866,000	
5	Episode 5	5 February 2023	Sunday 7:00pm	834,000	2	145,000	1	979,000	
6	Episode 6	6 February 2023	Monday 7:30pm	841,000	3	117,000	1	958,000	
7	Episode 7	7 February 2023	Tuesday 7:30pm	826,000	3	130,000	1	956,000	
8	Episode 8	8 February 2023	Wednesday 7:30pm	836,000	1	120,000	1	956,000	
9	Episode 9	12 February 2023	Sunday 7:00pm	933,000	1	70,000	1	1,003,000	
10	Episode 10	13 February 2023	Monday 7:30pm	779,000	3	100,000	1	879,000	
11	Episode 11	14 February 2023	Tuesday 7:30pm	762,000	4	97,000	1	859,000	
12	Episode 12	15 February 2023	Wednesday 7:30pm	849,000	1	105,000	1	954,000	
13	Episode 13	19 February 2023	Sunday 7:00pm	961,000	1	74,000	1	1,035,000	
14	Episode 14	20 February 2023	Monday 7:30pm	837,000	3	80,000	1	917,000	
15	Episode 15	21 February 2023	Tuesday 7:30pm	872,000	2	85,000	1	957,000	
16	Episode 16	22 February 2023	Wednesday 7:30pm	925,000	1	110,000	1	1,035,000	
17	Episode 17	26 February 2023	Sunday 7:00pm	928,000	1	69,000	1	997,000	
18	Episode 18	27 February 2023	Monday 7:30pm	885,000	3	92,000	1	977,000	
19	Episode 19	28 February 2023	Tuesday 7:30pm	898,000	1	100,000	1	998,000	
20	Episode 20	1 March 2023	Wednesday 7:30pm	921,000	1	122,000	1	1,043,000	
21	Episode 21	5 March 2023	Sunday 7:00pm	993,000	1	81,000	1	1,074,000	
22	Episode 22	6 March 2023	Monday 7:30pm	854,000	3	86,000	1	940,000	
23	Episode 23	7 March 2023	Tuesday 7:30pm	848,000	3	88,000	1	936,000	
24	Episode 24	8 March 2023	Wednesday 7:30pm	897,000	1	103,000	1	1,000,000	
25	Episode 25	12 March 2023	Sunday 7:00pm	867,000	1	89,000	1	956,000	
26	Episode 26	13 March 2023	Monday 7:30pm	835,000	3	97,000	1	932,000	
27	Episode 27	14 March 2023	Tuesday 7:30pm	881,000	1	103,000	1	984,000	
28	Episode 28	15 March 2023	Wednesday 7:30pm	855,000	1	126,000	1	981,000	
29	Episode 29	19 March 2023	Sunday 7:00pm	927,000	1	65,000	1	986,000	
30	Episode 30	20 March 2023	Monday 7:30pm	843,000	3	90,000	1	933,000	
31	Episode 31	21 March 2023	Tuesday 7:30pm	893,000	3	83,000	1	973,000	
32	Episode 32	22 March 2023	Wednesday 7:30pm	914,000	1	124,000	1	1,038,000	
33	Final Vows Part 1	26 March 2023	Sunday 7:00pm	924,000	2	62,000	1	987,000	
34	Final Vows Part 2	27 March 2023	Monday 7:30pm	913,000	3	68,000	1	981,000	
35	Reunion Dinner Party	2 April 2023	Sunday 7:00pm	1,077,000	1	76,000	1	1,153,000	
36	Reunion Finale	3 April 2023	Monday 7:30pm	1,066,000	1	87,000	1	1,153,000	
