= Mel Schilling =

Australian TV personality and coach (1972–2026)

- Born: Melanie Jane Schilling; 20 April 1972; Melbourne, Australia
- Died: 24 March 2026 (aged 53); London, England
- Other name: Melanie Jane Brisbane-Schilling
- Education: Deakin University (B.A.); University of Melbourne (GradD); Victoria University (C. G. S.)
- Occupations: Television personality; relationships coach
- Years active: 1998–2026
- Spouse: Gareth Brisbane (m. 2018)
- Children: 1

Melanie Jane Brisbane-Schilling (née Schilling; 20 April 1972 – 24 March 2026) was an Australian television personality, psychologist and relationship coach, best known for appearing as one of the dating experts on the Nine Network reality series Married at First Sight from 2016 until her death in 2026.

== Early life ==
Melanie Jane Schilling was born on 20 April 1972 in Melbourne, Australia, to Paul and Beth Schilling. She also had a sister, Rebecca.

She began her career in organizational psychology, attaining a B.A. in Psychology at Deakin University, as well as a graduate diploma at the University of Melbourne, and a graduate certificate in Human Resources and Industrial Relations at Victoria University. She worked as a practicing psychologist for over 20 years. She moved to a senior role at Personnel Decisions International in 2001. She later worked as a consulting psychologist with Extraversion Consulting.

== Career ==
In 2005, Schilling appeared in an episode of the police drama series Blue Heelers and played a nurse in an episode of the Network 10 soap opera Neighbours in 2007. Schilling began working for multinational and national consulting firms in which she specialised in behavioural assessment, leadership development and talent strategy. She later founded her own consultancy, coaching corporate and government clients across Australia and the Middle East. In 2013, she became the first Australian accredited by the International Dating Coaching Association, and was appointed Dating and Relationship Expert for the dating website eHarmony Australia in 2014, on which she had met her husband.

In 2016, Schilling joined the Nine Network reality series Married at First Sight as one of the dating experts for its second series. She remained on the show for the next decade.

Schilling lived in London and made several appearances on British television. Between 2021 and 2024, she made appearances as an expert on the British version of Married at First Sight. In 2023, she appeared as a contestant on an episode of the game show The Weakest Link, and in 2024, she appeared as one of the celebrity experts on The Wheel. In 2026, she appeared on the game show Countdown in dictionary corner.

== Personal life ==
Schilling married Gareth Brisbane in 2018, after several years of dating. Their daughter was born in November 2015 after they underwent IVF treatment.

In December 2023, Schilling was diagnosed with bowel cancer. She was subsequently given the all clear; however, in February 2024, during a routine check-up, nodules were discovered in her lungs. She underwent numerous rounds of chemotherapy over the next two years. In March 2026, Schilling announced that her cancer was terminal after it had metastasised to her lungs and the left side of her brain. She died from complications of the illness in London, England, on 24 March 2026, aged 53.

== Filmography ==
Year	Title	Role	Notes	Ref.
2005	Blue Heelers	Tina the Cook	Episode: "Night and Day"	
2007	Neighbours	Nurse	1 episode	
2016–2026	Married at First Sight	Herself	Dating expert	
2021–2025	Married at First Sight UK	Herself	Dating expert	
2023–2024	This Morning	Herself	Guest; 2 episodes	
2023	The Weakest Link	Herself	Contestant; 1 episode	
2024	The Wheel	Herself	Celebrity expert; 1 episode	
2026	Countdown	Herself	Dictionary corner; 5 episodes	
