= John Aiken (television personality) =

Australian television personality and former cricketer (born 1970)

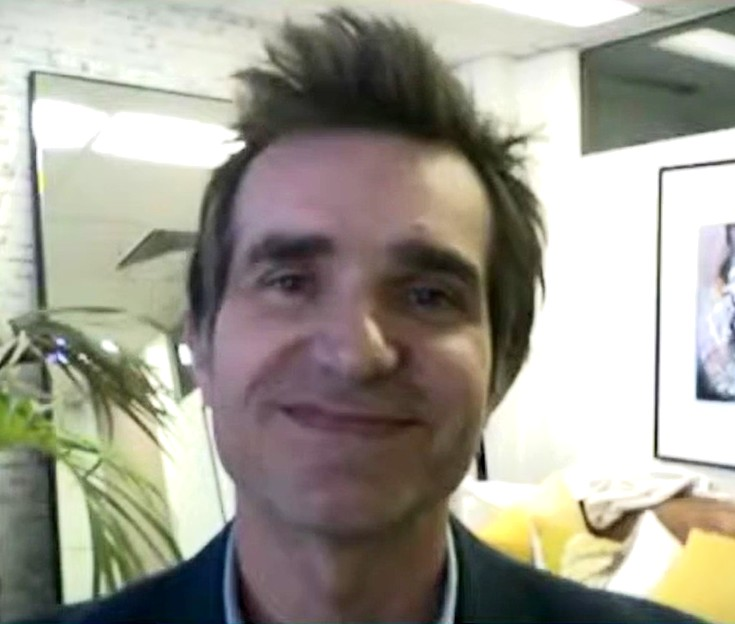
- Aiken in 2016

Personal information
- Full name: John Maxwell Aiken
- Born: 3 July 1970 (age 56); Sydney, New South Wales, Australia
- Batting: Left-handed

Domestic team information
- Years: Team
- 1989/90–1998/99: Wellington
- 1999/00–2000/01: Auckland

Career statistics
Competition	First-class	List A
Matches	46	39
Runs scored	2,170	817
Batting average	28.93	23.34
100s/50s	4/9	1/3
Top score	170*	101*
Balls bowled	18	–
Wickets	0	–
Bowling average	–	–
5 wickets in innings	–	–
10 wickets in match	–	–
Best bowling	–	–
Catches/stumpings	33/–	8/–
- Source: CricketArchive, 21 September 2008

John Maxwell Aiken (born 3 July 1970) is an Australian television personality, psychologist and former cricketer, who played for Auckland and Wellington in New Zealand. Since 2015, he has appeared as one of the experts on every season of the reality television series Married at First Sight Australia.

== Early life and cricket career ==
Aiken was born on 3 July 1970 in Sydney and moved to New Zealand in 1982 when he was 12 years old. He played as a left-handed batsman who played 46 first class matches and 39 one-day matches in a career spanning 11 seasons from 1989/90 to 2000/01. He scored 2,170 first-class runs at an average of 28.93. During his career, he played for New Zealand XIs against the West Indies, South Africa, Zimbabwe and Sri Lanka.

At the same time as his cricket career, Aiken trained as a relationship specialist and ran private practices in New Zealand and Australia, though he gave up his practice to focus on his media career.

== Media career ==
As a psychologist, Aiken has undertaken a range of media work, becoming the dating and relationship expert for the 9Honey television channel, and hosting the ABC documentaries Making Couples Happy and Making Families Happy. He has appeared as one of the experts on the popular Nine Network reality dating series Married at First Sight Australia since its first season in 2015.

== Personal life ==
Aiken has been married since 2007 to Kelly Swanson-Roe, whom he met in New Zealand. They married on Waiheke Island. They moved to Sydney in 2008 and have two children, Aston and Piper.
