= Australia–Philippines relations =

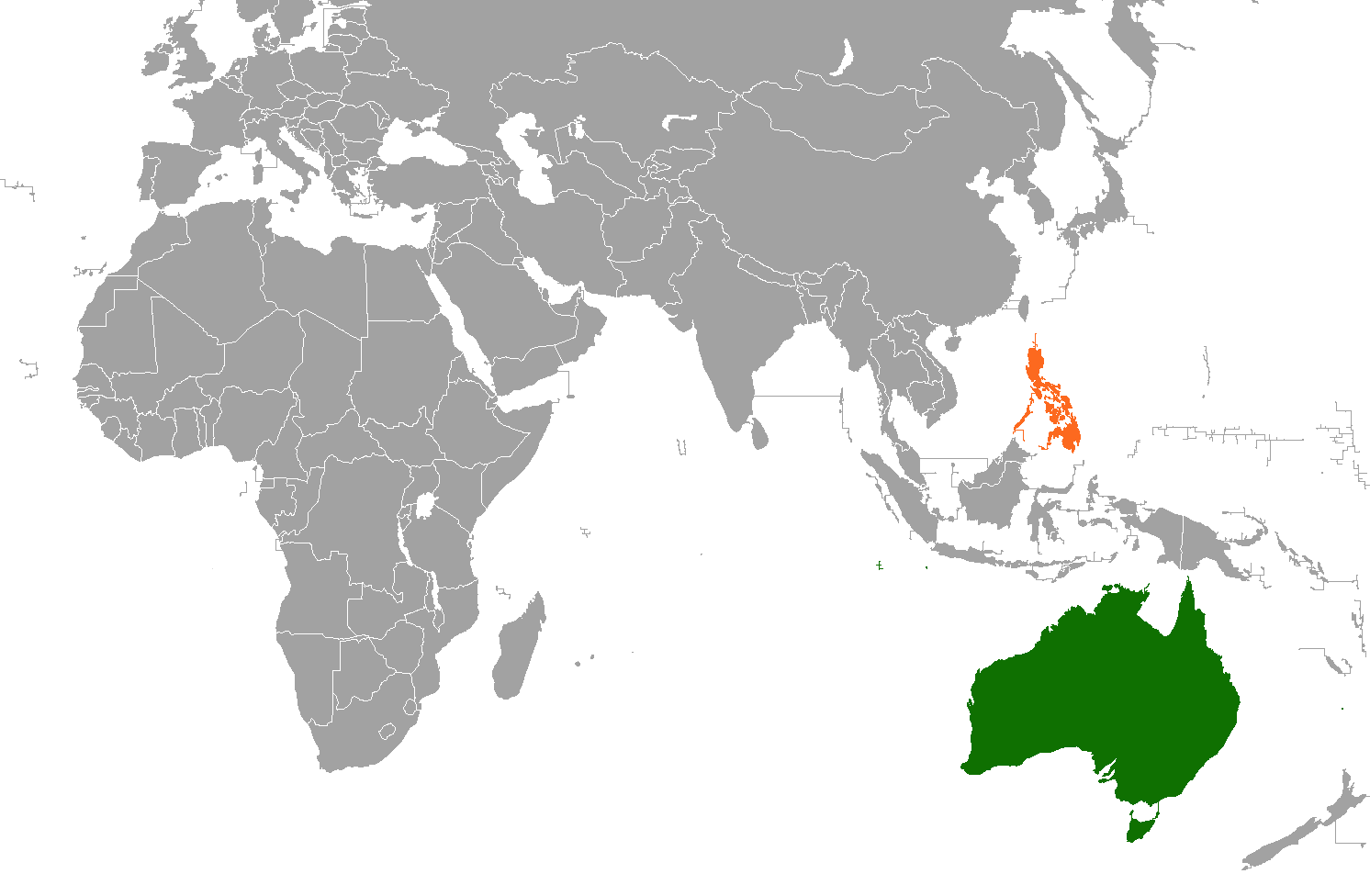

- Australia: Philippines

Diplomatic mission
- Australian Embassy, Manila: Philippine Embassy, Canberra

Envoy
- Ambassador Marc Innes-Brown: Ambassador Antonio A. Morales

Foreign relations between Australia and the Philippines cover a broad range of areas of cooperation including political, economic, development, defence, security, and cultural relations between Australia and the Philippines. The countries are both physically situated in the Western Pacific Ocean area, with no land borders to other nations. The two countries are members of Asia-Pacific Economic Cooperation, and universities in both countries are also part of Association of Pacific Rim Universities.

== History before 1946 ==
The earliest known links between the Philippines and Australia have been through the explorations being conducted by Spanish sailors in the Pacific. One of the bodies of water that connected the Philippines and Australia was the Torres Strait. The people who inhabited Torres Strait were of Melanesian descent and spoke two distinctive languages. They were different from Aboriginal Australians living on mainland Australia. Torres Strait was named after Luis Vaz de Torres, a Spanish captain, who sailed via the strait in 1606 towards the Philippines.

Early contacts between the Philippines and Australia have been in the form of trade. In the 1800s, the Philippines made use of the services of Nicolas Loney, Great Britain's Vice Consul to Iloilo, to improve the sugarcane industry. Loney utilized two British Brigs, the SS Pet and the SS Camilla to dock at the Port of Iloilo to load sugar going to Melbourne, Australia where the Victoria Sugar Company was waiting. The Negros Islands also exported sugar to Australia. Perdon (2014) also cites that Australians utilize the purchased sugar from the Philippines for the distillation of rum. On the other hand, Australia returned the favor by marketing its fresh bottled milks in Manila. Another commodity that Australia values from the Philippines is the manila hemp. Perdon (2014) explains the manila hemp's "fibre length, lightness and whiteness of colour" are the reasons why it is an in-demand product in Australia. An estimate of 9,000 to 15,000 piculs of manila hemp are exported to different countries, especially to Australia. Merchants from Sydney realized how profitable trading with Manila had become which led to them moving further north.

Another contributing factor to early Philippines-Australia relations is the Filipino migrant workers. The earliest Filipino workers were called the "ManilaMen" and they worked in the pearling industry in northern Australia. Mostly from the central and southern part of the Philippines, these Filipinos were "responsible, daring, and fatalistically brave". Filipinos played an integral part in the development of the pearl, trochus and beche-de-mer industries in Northern Australia. In 2016, a group of Indigenous Australians who are descendants of the Manila Men came to the Philippines to trace their ancestry and meet Filipino relations.

In the 19th century, one of the prominent Filipinos in Australia was Heriberto Zarcal. He was a jeweler in Thursday Island and owned a hotel named Noli Me Tangere. Zarcal operated a fleet of pearling boats, all bearing names indicating Filipino patriotic and nationalistic sentiments.

Zarcal was one of Emilio Aguinaldo's links outside the Philippines throughout the period of the Philippine revolution through to after the declaration of the first Philippine Independence in 1898. There was some suggestion that during the Philippine Revolution, he organized an Australian support committee for General Emilio Aguinaldo's revolution against Spanish rule, but there was direct evidence of this (Ileto).

=== Australia in the liberation of the Philippines ===
World War II forced Manuel L. Quezon, President of the Commonwealth of the Philippines, together with his family and officials, to move to Australia on 19 February 1942 on board a B-17 Flying Fortress. From Adelaide, President Quezon's group made its way to Melbourne in March 1942 to meet with General Douglas MacArthur, his wife, fellow officials, and friends. At Melbourne, President Quezon addressed the Filipino people on why he was forced to leave the country. His time in Australia was short. On 9 April 1942, Bataan fell and President Quezon and his group made their way to Washington to establish a government-in-exile. At the onslaught of the war, Australians joined their Filipino and Allied comrades in liberating the Philippines.

The liberation of the Philippines started on 20 October 1944 with the Leyte Gulf Landings. The naval invasion fleet at Leyte included the Australian frigate HMAS Gascoyne and Fairmile motor launch HDML 1074 in laying buoys to mark the approach channels. This was followed by ships delivering American troops that included the three Australian landing ships, or LSIs (Landing Ships, Infantry), HMA Ships Kanimbla, Manoora, and Westralia. Joining them were several Australian soldiers who helped in landing craft liaison teams. Protecting the force were allied warships, including the Australian cruisers HMA Ships Australia and Shropshire and destroyers HMA Ships Arunta and Warramunga.

HMAS Australia was the first Allied warship victim by a kamikaze aircraft when it was struck on 21 October. 30 of HMAS Australia's crew, including Captain Emile Dechaineux DSC, were killed or died of their wounds, and 64 were wounded, 26 seriously. HMAS Australia was accompanied out of the battle by HMAS Warramunga for repairs. HMAS Shropshire and HMAS Arunta stayed and participated in the Battle of Surigao Strait.

Australian civilians at Tacloban had been interned by the Japanese after the fall of the Philippines in 1942. They were described as "among the first prisoners of war and internees anywhere in the Pacific to be freed."

Three RAAF (Royal Australian Armed Forces) Wireless Units assisted in the Philippines. They were said to be "the most northerly based Australian land units in the Pacific war." They also provided air support for the Americans. In their first landing, Australian aircraft carried out attacks against enemy supply lines and then on 22 November 1944 Australian aircraft attacked targets for the first time. Boston light bombers of 22 Squadron pounced at Bunuwan harbour on Mindanao Island and Beaufighter strike-fighters of 30 Squadron attacked barges in Davao Gulf. During November and December, Catalina flying boats of 76 Wing dropped mines in Manila Bay to help American landings to the south on Mindoro Island. On the night of 14 December, nine Australian airmen died when a Catalina crashed or was shot down.

Three Airfield Construction Squadron RAAF landed at Mindoro on 15 December 1944. The Australians were in control of building airfields. While unloading the LSTs (Landing Ships, Tank), Japanese aircraft were attacking the area. Australians labored under the hot sun to unload equipment and supplies. Air raids occurred at half-hourly intermissions. American anti-aircraft gunners maintained a barrage of attacks but a kamikaze nearly hit an LST which Australian airmen were unloading supplies. Leading Aircraftman William Barham, 17 years old, was killed by a shrapnel. At night, the Australians at Mindoro Island already unloaded all of their equipment and gear and had moved inland to the first airfield that was to be built.

In January 1945, Australian warships participated in a big naval operation of the campaign when American forces landed at Lingayen Gulf for the invasion of Luzon. Manila was their target. Frigates Gascoyne and Warrego took part in survey tasks and escort duties. The Kanimbla, Manoora and Westralia transported American troops for the landings while being accompanied by Shropshire and Australia (underwent repairs) and destroyers Arunta and Warramunga.

The Australia seemed to be singled out by kamikazes. Between 5 and 9 January 1945, the Australia suffered considerable damage to it and the deaths of 25 crewmen. The warship was withdrawn for repairs and it took no further part in the war. It was replaced by the returning HMAS Hobart after being seriously damaged by a torpedo in 1943. The Arunta also lost two men killed when a kamikaze barely missed the ship. Other ships narrowly escaped damage. The gunners on all ships gunned down kamikazes before they could attack a ship.

Australians continued to help the Philippines until the war ended. Some RAAF squadrons were stationed in some islands to support Australian operations in Borneo. After the war, Australians were sent to the Philippines to support in the handling of prisoners of war returning from Japan on the way home to Australia.

In total, 4,000 Australian service personnel took part in the campaign, some fought as guerrillas after they escaped from Borneo to the Philippines two years earlier. 92 were killed during the liberation of the Philippines.

=== HMAS Arunta I and II ===
The Royal Australian Navy played a pivotal role in World War II. Australia deployed two ships that took part in Pacific war. HMAS Arunta I, one of three Tribal destroyers, was prepared for the American advance to the Philippines. On 13 October 1944, HMAS Arunta I made its way to Leyte Gulf at the Philippines. Together with HMA Ships Australia II, Shropshire and Warramunga I, to Task Group 77.3 (Close Covering Group) were led by Rear Admiral Berkley USN. On 25 October 1944, HMAS Arunta I, with Shropshire, participated in the Battle of Surigao Strait, one of the most crucial battles in World War II. The battle was fought at night and the Japanese were put in a tactical disadvantage when two battleships and three destroyers were defeated. HMAS Arunta I remained at the Leyte area until 16 November 1944 when she left for Manus, Papua New Guinea. After spending December at Manus, HMAS Arunta I returned to Leyte with HMA Ships Australia II, Shropshire, Warramunga I and three American destroyers. In January 1945, HMAS Arunta I took part in the landings at Lingayen. The Allied forces had 850 ships, 305 of which were either fighting or semi-fighting ships. HMAS Arunta I together with HMA Ships Australia II, Shropshire and Warramunga I were with Task Group 77.2. On 9 January 1945, the landings were completed in the midst of aerial assaults. The Australia II was hit five times while Arunta I was damaged when a "Kamikaze" narrowly missed her. After the landings, Arunta I accompanied Australia II to Lingayen then reported back to Leyte in order to reunite with Task Group 77.2. HMAS Arunta I continued to help in the Philippines campaign as part of the Lingayen Defence Force. On 10 March, she went back to Sydney for repairs after a brief stay at Manus. She later returned to Manila. HMAS Arunta I stayed in home waters (Sydney) until 3 December 1946 when she departed to Japan with Shropshire.

The second is HMAS Arunta II where it served during the battles of Leyte Gulf and Lingayen Gulf. Also, HMAS Arunta is the second Royal Australian Navy ship to use the name, and it had historical ties to the Philippines. HMAS visited the Philippines from 7–11 October 2015 and has two Filipino-Australian sailors that are currently serving as part of Arunta's ship's company. They are able Seaman Electronics Technician Aaron Scott and Able Seaman Boatswains Mate Matthew Parry.

=== Post-war relations and the White Australia policy ===
Australia and the Philippines were on friendly terms after the end of World War II. President Manuel Roxas and Prime Minister Ben Chifley exchanged messages of friendship to mark Philippine independence in July 1946. Elpidio Quirino, Roxas's successor in the presidency, sought out Australia as a potential strategic partner, hoping to lessen his country's dependence on the United States.

Relations between Australia and the Philippines were damaged by the Australian government's treatment of Lorenzo Gamboa—a Filipino man with an Australian wife and children—who was refused entry under the White Australia policy. Previously, very few Filipinos had been unaware that such a policy existed.

In March 1949, Congressman Hermenegildo Atienza introduced House Bill No. 2613 (the "Reciprocity Immigration Bill") into the Philippine House of Representatives. The bill would have banned any person from entering the Philippines, unless the other country's laws allowed the admission of Filipinos; it was directly targeted at Australia. Cipriano Primicias called Australians "the biggest hypocrites in the world" in the ensuing debate. President Quirino expressed his disappointment "that our neighbour, to whom we looked for friendship, should exclude us because of our colour", and stated that "we, the people of the Philippines, have been deeply humiliated". The bill was passed by the House of Representatives on 27 April. The Senate added an amendment exempting Australian wives of Filipino citizens, but a sudden adjournment prevented a final vote on the bill. After a change of government in December 1949 the new Australian government allowed Gamboa to enter the country. However, his treatment continued to be remembered by Filipinos for many years, and according to one Australian diplomat, "all Filipinos from Manila to the most distant hinterlands knew of Gamboa and the White Australia Policy; in some cases, these two items constituted their only knowledge of Australia".

== World War II memorials ==
=== Lingayen ===
At the aftermath of World War II, the Philippines made two memorial sites for Australians who sacrificed their lives to protect the country. On 20 February 2009, the Australian Embassy in the Philippines and the Provincial Government of Pangansinan presented a memorial plaque in Lingayen to honor the Royal Australian Navy's contribution in the Invasion of Lingayen Gulf in World War II. A wreath laying ceremony was held at the Lingayen Gulf to remember the Royal Australian Navy personnel who died in the battle.

=== Leyte ===
On 18 October 2014, the Philippines honored 92 Australians at Palo, Leyte who paid the ultimate price of liberating the Philippines. The memorial is close to the site of General Douglas MacArthur's landing spot after leading the charge from Australia. The Royal Australian Navy also played a pivotal role in the largest naval battle at Surigao Strait and in the Battle of Lingayen Gulf. The Australian Army bombardment liaison team helped the naval attack while the landing was happening. Also, the Royal Australian Air Force provided aerial photo reconnaissance and aerial mine-laying.

=== Subic Bay ===
On 1 July 2009, then Australian Ambassador to the Philippines Rod Smith unveiled the Montevideo Maru plaque at the Hellships Memorial. The Japanese ship SS Montevideo Maru was sunk in 1942 while carrying 1,000 Australian Service personnel and civilian prisoners of war.

=== Bataan ===
Bataan, one of the areas greatly affected by World War II, honoured the gallantry of the Royal Australian Air Force Catalina A24-64 personnel who contributed to the liberation of the Philippines. The crew composed of 43 Squadron Black Cat Catalina A24-64, known as "The Dabster", flew their last mission together on 14 December 1944, the night before Australian and US forces were to land at San Jose on the island of Mindoro. 24 Catalinas were tasked to lay mines at a very low altitude to stop the Japanese from leaving Manila Bay and interfering with the Mindoro landing. "The Dabster" was number six in an offensive of 15 aircraft that came from Jinamoc.

"The Dabster" never came back to Jinamoc on completion of the mission. The crew of nine was among the first 56 Australians who died over the next 23 days during the Mindoro and Lingayen Gulf landing phase of the liberation of the Philippines that continued until 5 July 1945.

An Australian built Tribal Class destroyer was named HMAS Bataan – in tribute to the Australian-American alliance during World War II, and recognition of the courageous stand by allied forces on the Bataan Peninsula in the Philippines. Jean Marie MacArthur, the wife of General Douglas MacArthur, was invited to launch her.

=== Surigao ===
The Royal Australian Navy played a pivotal role in the "world's last big-gun naval battle" at Surigao Strait and in the Battle of Lingayen Gulf. Australian Army bombardment liaison squads helped to safeguard the accuracy of naval attack in support of the landings and the Royal Australian Air Force contributed with aerial photo reconnaissance and aerial mine-laying.

== Establishment of formal diplomatic relations ==
On 22 May 1946, an Australian official who became Secretary of the Department of Foreign Affairs, Herbert Peterson, established the Australian Consulate General office in the Manila Hotel, beginning the bilateral relations between Australia and the Philippines.

This happened before the inauguration speech of Manuel Roxas as President of the Commonwealth of the Philippines, and weeks before the foundation of the Republic of the Philippines on 4 July 1946.

After World War II, the Philippines was faced with the task of rebuilding. Also, as a new republic, the Philippines had to find its place in the international community. Australia has made itself available to help the Philippines on this journey.

On the eve of his 4 July inauguration, President Roxas said in a radio broadcast that Australia was one of the Philippines' most important geographic neighbours and one which the people of the Philippines especially wished to promote. He said, "Our interest in the land down under is not confined to sentiment. Australia is a sister democracy of the western pattern. We are in the same ideological camp. Australia is a natural ally of the Philippines."

=== Consular offices and embassies ===
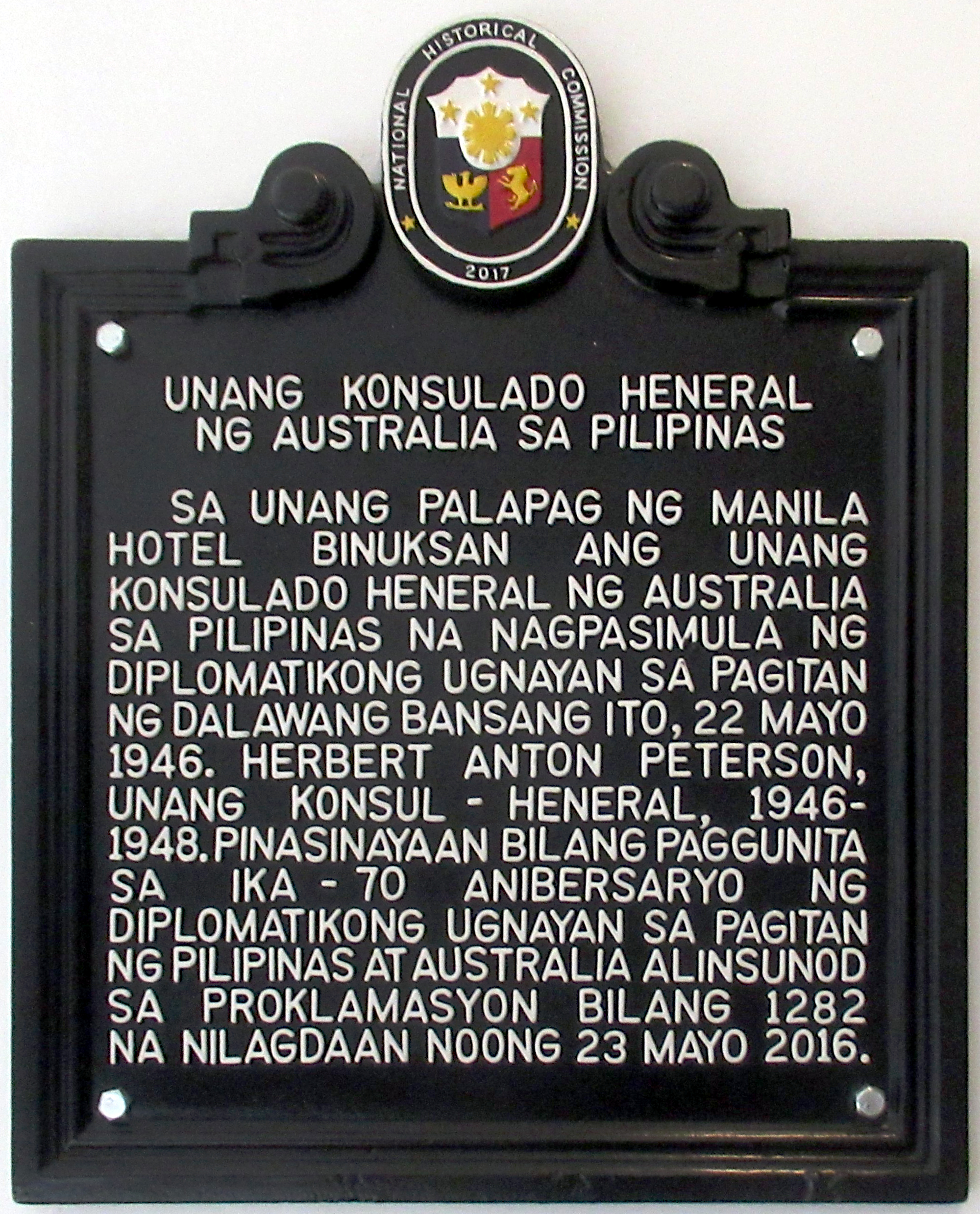
National historical marker unveiled in 2017 at the Manila Hotel to commemorate the first Consulate-General of Australia

On 22 May 1946, the first Australian Consulate-General in the Philippines opened at The Manila Hotel. Herbert Peterson was appointed as the first Consul-General. In 1947, the Philippines was able to establish its first Philippine mission in Sydney, Australia. On 15 April 1948, Consul General Manuel A. Alzate and his eight colleagues were able to establish a consular office at a property, 11 Onslow Avenue, Elizabeth Bay, Sydney, purchased by the Philippine Government. 1949 saw the upgrade of Philippine consular office to a Philippine Legation. In 1956, the Philippine Legation was elevated to a Philippine Embassy with Roberto F. Regala as the first Philippine Ambassador to Australia. Back in Manila, Keith Charles Owen "Mick" Shann was appointed the first Australian Ambassador to the Philippines in 1957. In March 1961, the Philippine embassy was moved from Sydney to Australia's capital of Canberra. The following year saw the construction of the Philippine Embassy at 1 Moonah Place, Yarralumla, ACT. The Philippine Embassy was temporarily placed at 1 Arkana St., Yarralumla, ACT. On 12 June 1964, the official inauguration of the Philippine Embassy took place at 1 Moonah Place, Yarralumla, ACT under Philippine Ambassador to Australia Mariano Ezpeleta.

In December 2023, the Australian government posted a joint declaration of a strategic partnership between the Philippines and Australia.

==== Timeline of Australian Embassy Chancery locations ====
Year	Address
1950	MRS Buildings, Plaza Cervantes, Manila
1951–1952	3rd Floor, El Hogar, Filipino Building, Manila
1953–1956	207 Ayala Building, Juan Luna, Manila
1957–1971	501 Ayala Building, Juan Luna, Manila
1972–1986	China Banking Corporation Building, Paseo de Roxas, Makati, Rizal
1987–1991	Bank of the Philippine Islands Building, Ayala Avenue, Cnr Paseo de Roxas, Makati, Metro Manila
1992–2003	Salustiana Dee Ty Tower, 104 Paseo de Roxas Ave Makita, Manila
2003–present	Level 23 Tower 2 RCBC Plaza 6819 Ayala Avenue, Makati City, 1200

==== Ambassadors to the Philippines and Australia ====
Table for Consuls-General from Australia to the Philippines

Consul-General	Term
Herbert Peterson	1946–1948
Keith Waller	1948–1950

Table for Ministers from Australia to the Philippines

Minister	Term
George D. Moore	1950–1955
Mick Shann	1955–1957

Table of Ambassadors from Australia to the Philippines

Ambassadors to the Philippines	Term
Mick Shann	1957–1959
Alfred Stirling	1959–1963
Bill Cutts	1963–1966
Francis Hamilton Stuart	1966–1970
James Ingram	1970–1973
Peter Henderson	1973–1975
Daniel Nutter	1975–1978
Richard Woolcott	1978–1982
Roy Fernandez	1982–1986
John Holloway	1986–1989
Mack Williams	1989–1994
Richard Smith	1994–1996
Miles Kupa	1996–1999
John Buckley	1999–2002
Ruth Pearce	2002–2005
Tony Hely	2005–2008
Rod Smith	2008–2012
Bill Tweddell	2012–2016
Amanda Gorely	2016–2018
Steven J. Robinson AO	2019–2022
Hae Kyong (HK) Yu PSM	2022–present

Table for Consuls-General from the Philippines to Australia

Consul-General	Term
Manuel A. Alzate	1948*

Table of Ambassadors from the Philippines to Australia

Ambassadors to Australia	Term
Roberto Regala	1950–1956
Jose Imperial	1956–1960
Mario Ezpeleta	1960–1970
Gregorio Abad	1971–1977
Leticia Ramos-Shahani	1978–1980
Monico R. Vicente	1982–1986
Romualdo A. Ong	1986–1989
Rora Navarro-Tolentino	1989–1994
Delia Domingo-Albert	1994–2001
Willy C. Gaa	2001–2003
Christina G. Ortega	2004–2006
Ernesto De Leon	2006–2010
Belen F. Anota	2011–2015
Minda Calaguian-Cruz	2016–2018
Ma. Hellen Barber De La Vega	2018–present

== 21st century bilateral relations ==
Australia and the Philippines have a long history of bilateral cooperation. The relationships grew, with people-to-people links, development assistance towards sustainable growth, trade and investment to expand economic ties, defence, and law enforcement cooperation.

Australia and the Philippines have at least 120 agreements aimed at promoting political, security, economic and socio-cultural linkages and cooperation.

The two countries take turns to host the Philippines-Australia Ministerial Meeting (PAMM). The PAMM sets the direction and vision of Philippines-Australia bilateral relations and serves as the forum to discuss initiatives and activities to strengthen the bilateral partnership. The first meeting was hosted by Australia in 2008. The 4th meeting was hosted by the Philippines in February 2014

=== Comprehensive partnership ===
On 18 November 2015, then Philippine President Benigno S. Aquino met with Australian Prime Minister Malcolm Turnbull who was on his first visit to the Philippines. They signed the Joint Declaration on Philippines-Australia Comprehensive Partnership. This declaration acknowledges the increasing importance of Philippine-Australia relations, which establishes the foundation of the ties in the future. They had extensive discussions on how to further improve the bilateral relations, and enhance the cooperation and engagement on regional and international issues.

Through the declaration, the Philippines and Australia reaffirmed the importance of engagement and cooperation in the political, defense and security, law enforcement, and counter-terrorism fields, among others. They also exchanged views on regional security challenges, which include maritime security. The two countries are committed to conducting more "substantive and meaningful" activities between the Armed Forces of the Philippines and the Australian Defence Force to foster camaraderie and assurance and enhance interoperability.

Also, President Aquino thanked Prime Minister Turnbull for Australia's constant support to the modernization of the Philippine military, including the recent contribution of two landing craft heavy vessels to the Philippine Navy. These are significant assets to Philippine defense and also to disaster response activities. One of these vessels was deployed in the Philippine Navy's relief operations in the wake of Typhoon Koppu.

When it comes to disaster risk reduction and management (DRRM), Australia has a history of providing support to communities and the Philippine government. One such assistance is by funding the through the Resilience and Preparedness towards Inclusive Development (RAPID) Programme which aims to enhance the Philippines' DRRM capacities .

Australia's aid investments in the Philippines have contributed significantly in areas such as education and infrastructure development. There is also the School Building Program for Basic Education, Provincial Road Management Facility, and the Mindanao Trust Fund-Reconstruction and Development Program, among others.

President Aquino and Prime Minister Turnbull are also wary of the need to increase bilateral trade between their respective countries. Australia has supported Philippine public-private partnership (PPP) programs which provides stronger policy, legal, institutional, and regulatory environment for PPPs.

In terms of people-to-people exchanges, the Philippines-Australia Memorandum of Understanding on Cooperation in Technical and Vocational Education and Training (TVET) was introduced by Aquino and Turnbull. This initiative would facilitate information sharing when it comes to capacity-building and work ethics for Filipinos and Australians.

On 24 July 2012, the Philippine Senate ratified the Philippines–Australia Status of Visiting Forces Agreement (SOVFA). It provided a "more comprehensive legal framework for the presence of one country's forces in the other." SOVFA practices reciprocity. The Agreement houses real-world issues—including immigration and customs, arrangements for visiting forces to wear uniforms while in the other country, and criminal and civil jurisdiction over visiting forces while in the other country. The two countries signed the Agreement on 31 May 2007. Ratification enabled its entry into force.

On 20 February 2014, Philippine Secretary of Foreign Affairs, Albert del Rosario, and Secretary of Trade and Industry, Gregory Domingo, met with the Australian Minister for Foreign Affairs, Julie Bishop MP, and Minister for Trade and Investment, Andrew Robb AO MP, met for the Fourth Philippines-Australia Ministerial Meeting. The Secretaries and Ministers approved that the Philippines and Australia would preserve and develop bilateral co-operation on defence and security matters, especially the entry into force of SOVFA. They noted that SOVFA's successful implementation in the form of training in Australia for Philippine defence personnel and the utilization of Australian Defence Force assets and personnel to support in the Typhoon Yolanda relief operations.

In November 2026, the two countries signed an updated defense cooperation agreement.

=== High-level visits ===
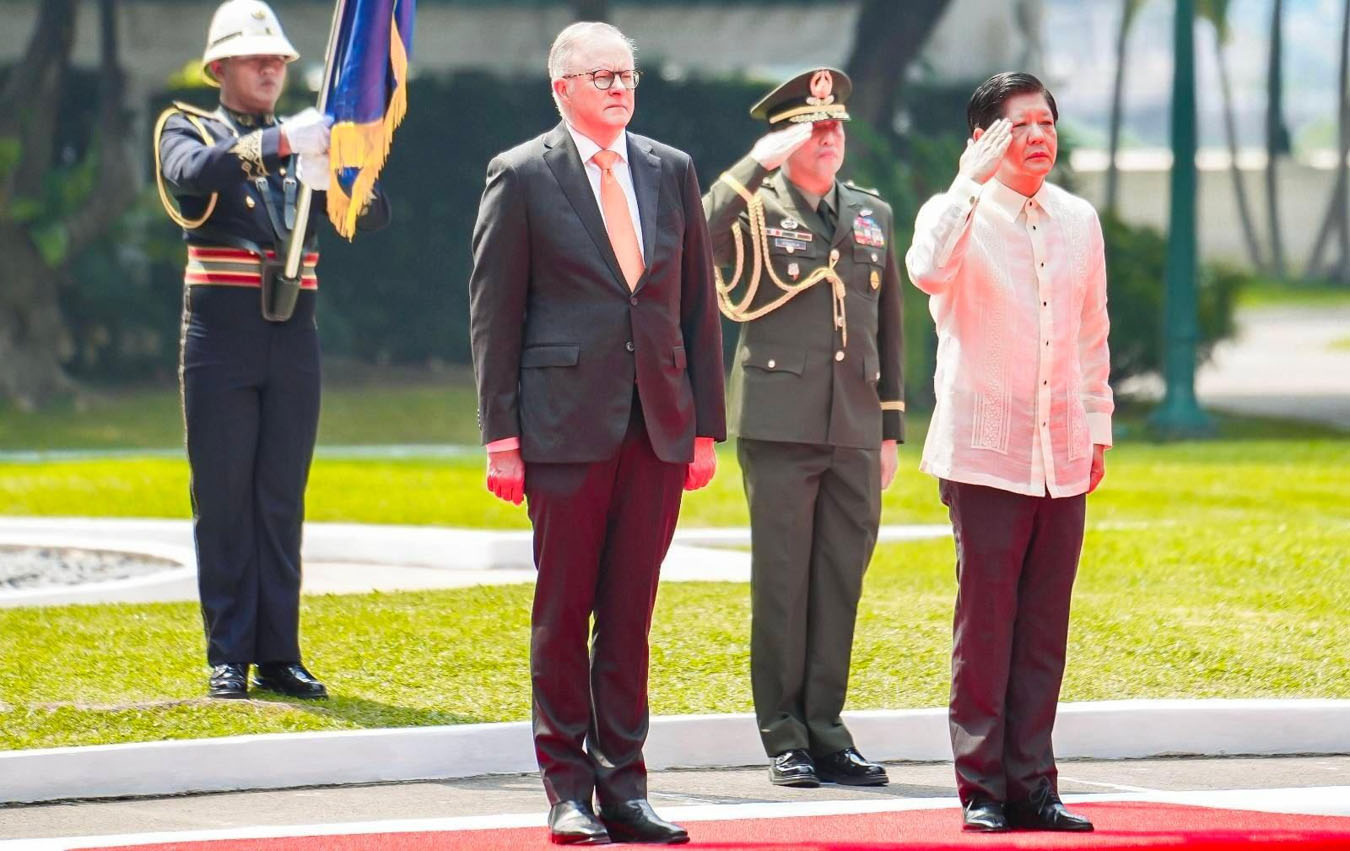
Australian Prime Minister Anthony Albanese and Philippine President Bongbong Marcos during the former's official visit to Manila in September 2023

Since the establishment of diplomatic relations, there have been many high-level visits between the two countries. Vice President Carlos P. García was on an official visit to Australia at the time of President Ramon Magsaysay's untimely death, and returned to the Philippines to assume the presidency and serve out the last eight months of Magsaysay's term. President Ferdinand Marcos Sr. visited Australia from 21 to 24 December 1967 to attend the memorial service of Prime Minister Harold Holt. President Fidel V. Ramos had a state visit to Australia in 1995. President Gloria Macapagal-Arroyo made two visits to Australia. First was a state visit in May 2007 while the second one was in September 2007 for the 15th APEC Economic Leaders Meeting. The last one to visit Australia was President Bongbong Marcos in February 2024.

==== Timeline of high-level visits ====
1995	Philippine President Fidel V. Ramos' first visit to Australia.
November 1996	Australian Prime Minister John Howard visited the Philippines to attend the 4th APEC Summit with Deputy Prime Minister Tim Fischer and Foreign Minister Alexander Downer.
July 2003	Australian Prime Minister John Howard's second visit to the Philippines.
January 2007	Australian Prime Minister John Howard visited Cebu for the 2nd East Asia Summit.
30–31 May 2007 7–9 September 2007	Philippine President Gloria Macapagal-Arroyo made her state visit to Australia.
11–14 April 2012	Australian Governor General Quentin Bryce's state visit to the Philippines.
25 October 2012	Philippine President Benigno S. Aquino III's state visit to Australia.
18–19 November 2015	Australian Prime Minister Malcolm Turnbull attended the APEC Philippines 2015 along with Philippine President Benigno S. Aquino III and other heads of state.
13–14 November 2017	Australian Prime Minister Malcolm Turnbull attended the 31st ASEAN Summit as a guest and the Twelfth East Asia Summit.
29 June – 1 July 2022	Australian Governor General David Hurley attended the inauguration of Bongbong Marcos as the 17th president of the Philippines.
7–8 September 2023	Australian Prime Minister Anthony Albanese's official visit to the Philippines.
28–29 February 2024	Philippine President Bongbong Marcos' state visit to Australia. He became the first Philippine president to address a joint session of the Parliament of Australia.

== 70th anniversary of diplomatic relations ==
=== Overview ===
The two countries celebrated 70 years of diplomatic relations in 2016. This bilateral relation was established when Australia opened a Consulate General in Manila on 22 May 1946. The anniversary is being celebrated in the Philippines and Australia. The Australian Embassy in the Philippines launched the 'Philippines and Australia: The First 70 Years' exhibition in November 2015. This exhibition featured momentous milestones in the shared history between Australia and the Philippines like the efforts of over 4,000 Australian service personnel who fought side by side with Filipino and Allied forces in World War II, to Australian medical mission teams working alongside other Filipino and international humanitarian communities in the aftermath of Typhoon Yolanda in 2013. With this, the exhibit epitomizes the shared history of the Philippines and Australia. One facet of this is people-to-people links, which continues to grow at a staggering pace. Over 250,000 Filipinos now call Australia home, making up the sixth largest migrant community in Australia, and they continue to make a helpful input to Australian society.

At the same time, the Philippine Embassy in Canberra also celebrated the anniversary. Philippine Ambassador Minda Calaguian-Cruz and Australian Foreign Affairs Secretary Peter Varghese co-hosted a diplomatic reception on 20 June 2016 at the Australian Department of Foreign Affairs and Trade (DFAT). DFAT secretary Varghese presented former Philippine Secretary of Foreign Affairs and former Philippine Ambassador to Australia Delia Domingo-Albert a 70th Anniversary Friendship Award in acknowledgment of her far-reaching assistance to the enrichment of Philippine-Australian relations. One of her notable achievements is the awarding of Philippine Liberation Medals to 3,800 Australian soldiers who participated in the campaign to liberate the Philippines during World War II. Ambassador Minda Calaguian-Cruz mentioned that bilateral relations achieved its pinnacle last year with the signing by President Benigno Aquino III and Prime Minister Malcolm Turnbull of the historic joint Declaration on Philippines-Australia Comprehensive Partnership. The Declaration enabled more strategic and meaningful collaboration on bilateral, regional, and global issues of mutual interest. Guests such as the members of the diplomatic corps, defence, business, think-tanks, educational institutions, former Australian Ambassadors to the Philippines, students in the New Colombo Plan who attended Philippine universities and Filipino business and community leaders joined the officials of the two countries in celebrating seven decades of dynamic friendship.

The following day, Bayanihan, the National Folk Dance Company of the Philippines, ended their tour in Australia after a series of performances in Canberra to celebrate the 118th Anniversary of the Proclamation of Philippine Independence and 70th Anniversary.

== Trade and investment ==
Monthly value of Australian merchandise exports to the Philippines (A$ millions) since 1988

Monthly value of Philippine merchandise exports to Australia (A$ millions) since 1988

Australia seeks to strengthen its significant economic ties with the Philippines and other countries in the Asia-Pacific region. Australia and the Philippines are both members of APEC (which the Philippines hosted in 2015), and Australia is an active participant in the East Asia Summit (EAS). Australia's trade relationship with the Philippines is also supported by the ASEAN Australia New Zealand Free Trade Agreement (AANZFTA).

The ASEAN-Australia-New Zealand Free Trade Agreement (AANZ) now allows for 95% of Australian products to enter the Philippines duty free while 97% of Philippine-made products can enter Australia with the same advantage.

=== Australian investments in the Philippines ===
More than 280 Australian companies create 40,000 jobs in the Philippines. Australian investments of close to A$500 million across a multitude of sectors contribute to knowledge sharing and economic growth. Some of the Australian companies in the Philippines include:

- ANZ Bank
- Austal
- Cardno
- Crone Partners
- Greenstone
- IDP
- Macquarie
- OceanaGold
- Orica
- Qantas
- QBE Group

Site Skills Training is situated in Clark Freeport Zone, Pampanga. Its 300,000 sqm campus is the former site of Expo Pilipino. Site Skills Training (RTO 32531) delivers training for mining, oil and gas, engineering and construction industries. It is part of Site Group International which have other business units in the Philippines, which include Site Axial, Site WorkReady, Site Online, and TESOL Asia.

Telstra, a business process outsourcing (BPO) company, employs the highest number of Filipinos in the industry.

=== Australian companies in the Philippines ===
Australian retail brands have a huge presence in the Philippine market. In the realm of cosmetics, BYS Cosmetics has a large range of products in the Philippines, with around 1,000 products in Watson stores from all over the country. Cotton On is one of the premier retail clothing brands in the world. Since its opening in September 2012, there are 21 Cotton On and six Cotton On Kids stores nationwide. Ever New is a female fashion brand that has four retail boutiques in Manila and one in Cebu. Holster shoe is an Australian brand that incorporates jewelry, studs and Swarovski elements in its designs. Shoe Salon outlets have Holster shoes in their inventories.

On 9 September 1971, Philippine Airlines expanded its Australian operations to Melbourne. Years later in 2013, two additional routes reaching three Australian cities are introduced. Manila-Darwin-Brisbane vice versa operates three times weekly while Manila-Darwin-Perth vice versa flies four times weekly. Both routes use Airbus A320 jets. Darwin and Perth are original destinations for PAL while Brisbane was last commenced in October 2010.

==== Philippine companies in Australia ====
International Container Terminal Services, Inc. (ICTSI) obtains, manages, and operates container ports and terminals worldwide. Founded in December 1987, ICTSI began to expand from its flagship operations at the Manila International Container Terminal to other domestic and international markets in 1994.

As of 2016, ICTSI Ltd. manages operations on all acquired foreign terminals. It has regional representatives in Manila, Hong Kong, Miami, Sydney, Dubai and Cape Town, with plans to expand in Asia, Australia, the Indian Subcontinent, the Middle East, Africa, Europe and the Americas.

Monde Nissin created the popular Filipino noodle brand Lucky Me! and other product lines in various food categories. In 2015, Monde Nissin (Australia) Pty. Ltd. company obtained Nudie Juice, a manufacturer, marketer and distributor of pure premium juices in Australia. Nudie originated in the kitchen of founder Tim Pethick who mixed different fruit juices and smoothies for his family. Nudie was started in 2003 and has soared as Australia's number one chilled juice brand in grocery stores and is one of the "top 20 most desired food and beverage brands in the Asia Pacific." Nudie also possess one of the leading coconut water brands in Australia. Monde Nissin Chief Nudie James Ajaka said, "This event is a great opportunity for us to work closely with the Monde Nissin group and capitalize on their extensive experience and presence in several Asian markets. We also look forward to working together to ensure the Nudie brand goes from strength to strength here in Australia."

=== Business groups ===
The Australian-New Zealand Chamber of Commerce (Philippines) Inc came from the Australian Business Group (ABG), which was started by the Australian Senior Trade Commissioner Bill Brigstocke. The ABG was created by the Austrade Senior Trade Commissioner in 1974 to give a platform for Australian businessmen based in Manila or who are visiting. Also, there was the goal of being able to reach the bilateral level as the American Chamber. The ABG invites speakers to meetings, which gave the businessmen the opportunity to obtain information about what policies were being put into practice by the Administration. Arranging meetings during those times were made through the Trade Commissioner's office at the Australian Embassy. The Australian Ambassador back then was Gerry Nutter and he was supportive of the ABG. Around the late '70s there was an increasing interest in structuring the Australian Business Group into a Chamber of Commerce. The current Australian Ambassador at the time was Richard Woolcott, and the Australian Senior Trade Commissioner, John Skinner, were both very influential in the creation of the Chamber of Commerce. On 19 November 1981, the incorporators of the Chamber in the presence of Richard Woolcott and John Skinner signed the Articles of Incorporation of the Australian Chamber of Commerce and Industry Philippines, Inc.

The Australia Philippines Business Council (APBC) started in April 1975, it has entrenched itself as the leading private sector organisation that specializes in fostering and deepening trade and investment between Australia and the Philippines. The APBC attracts members from many industries based in New South Wales, Victoria, Queensland, South Australia, Western Australia and the Philippines.

The Chamber of Commerce and Industry Australia Philippines Incorporated is the pioneer local Chamber of Commerce and Industry in Australia wherein bilateral trade relations between Australia and the Philippines is the focal point of its charter. CCIAP affirms in the Australian multicultural principle of productive diversity which emphasizes the important cultural and economic factors arising from the diversity of the population. CCIAP is primarily composed of Philippine-born Australians (the fourth largest non-English speaking ethnic group in Queensland), CCIAP members have the luxury of maximizing business opportunities and strengthening cultural ties between Queensland and the Philippines.

== Development cooperation ==
Australia's aid program in the Philippines program has been reshaped to form a consolidated program aligned with the key objectives of inclusive economic growth; effective governance; and peace and stability. This reflects a transition from a traditional donor-recipient partnership to an economic partnership with the Philippines, with an emphasis on investments that are targeted, catalytic, leverage the Philippine Government's own resources and are based on the Philippines' own commitments in the Filipino Development Plan.

=== Official Development Assistance ===
In 2013, Australia was the single largest source of Official Development Assistance (ODA) for the Philippines according to National Economic Development Authority (NEDA) statistics. The Australian Government provided A$170.1 million or approximately PHP6.8 billion in official development assistance (ODA) expected for the 2013-14 financial year.

In 2014–15, the Australian Government provided an estimated PHP5.7 billion (A$143 million) in official development assistance to the Philippines.

The total Australian Official Development Assistance (ODA) to the Philippines is estimated to be at A$81.9 million in 2016–17.

Australia focuses on providing technical assistance and capacity-building measures to the Philippines. Australian ODA has three objectives on how it can help the Philippines in terms of aid. First, Australia is strengthening the base for economic progress in the Philippines. Investing in education has enabled Australia to help the Philippines in producing a well-educated workforce. Second, Australia is able to build stronger, transparent and accountable government institutions. Australia is a strong proponent of improving the quality of public service in the Philippines. Australia is a constant supporter of the Philippine Government as it embraces governance with accountability and transparency. Lastly, Australia is an advocate of peace and stability. Much of this is focused on Mindanao as Australia supports the ongoing peace talks there. Australian investment on peace and stability is specific, flexible and tried and tested.

=== Education reforms ===
Australia has been supportive of Philippine education for almost two decades. In 2016, Australia was the single largest grant donor to the education sector in the Philippines. Former Department of Education Secretary Brother Armin Luistro, FSC described Australia as a "partner of choice" when it comes to technical expertise on basic education reform. For over two decades, Australia has consistently supported reform measures, provided teacher training and scholarships, constructed disaster resilient school buildings and refurbished learning centres and classrooms.

The Basic Education Sector Transformation (BEST) is an Australian aid programme. Its intention is to contribute to improving the quality of education via better training regimens for teachers and improved school curriculum. The initiative supports the increased participation of boys, especially since more girls study in the Philippines than boys. BEST intends to support Australian and Philippine universities and their collaboration.

Australia provides short-term training and long-term scholarships for post-graduate study in Australia. The value is set at A$73 million from 2009 to 2019.

=== Australia Awards ===
Australia Awards Scholarships are offered by the Australian Government to the next global leaders for development. Recipients develop the necessary skills and knowledge to be agents of effective change and help build long-term people-to-people links with Australia. The Australia Awards Scholarships have been an important aspect of the Australian Government's aid program in the Philippines. It gives "high-achieving" Filipino development leaders with the chance to pursue post-graduate studies in Australian institutions and contribute to Philippine development.

=== Infrastructure ===
The Provincial Road Management Facility (PRMF) was a partnership between the Philippines and Australia to develop road infrastructure and local governance in the Southern Philippines. The Facility helps provincial governments to progress and preserve a core network of provincial roads in 10 provinces in Mindanao and the Visayas, i.e. Agusan del Sur, Aklan, Bohol, Bukidnon, Davao del Norte, Guimaras, Lanao del Norte, Misamis Occidental, Misamis Oriental and Surigao del Norte. Through this, Australia has worked to maintain the improvement of local accessibility in partnership with the Department of the Interior and Local Government (DILG) and provincial governments. Roads rehabilitated and preserved by the Facility are able to cut transportation costs and increase access of poor Filipinos to basic services.

=== Improved financial management ===
The Philippines–Australia Public Financial Management Program (PFMP) is a long-term partnership between the Philippines and Australia to "improve the efficiency, accountability and transparency of public fund use in the Philippines." The Australian Government has committed $30 million (AUD) to the program for a period of five years, since October 2011 up to 2016. The PFMP supports the Philippine Government to implement its Philippine PFM Reform Roadmap: Towards Improved Accountability and Transparency, 2011–2015. This comprehensive PFM reform agenda aims "to clarify, simplify, improve and harmonize the financial management processes and information systems of the civil service in the Philippines."

== Humanitarian assistance ==
=== Disaster risk management and climate change adaptation ===
Disaster risk management was able to strengthen the partnership of the Philippines and Australia. The Australian Government introduced two projects that would enhance the capability of the Philippines to withstand climate change and natural disasters. The Australian Government has provided monetary help to strengthen the capacity of the Philippine technical agencies in assessing preventive measures and actions. Australia also contributed Light Detection and Ranging (LiDAR) technology to help the Philippines assess its vulnerability and prepare for future calamities. Also, Australia has collaborated with the United Nations Development Programme (UNDP) in helping the Philippine National Disaster Risk Reduction and Management Council (NDRRMC) develop a vulnerability map of Metro Manila. The Philippines-Australia Community Assistance Program has created the Microfinance Technokit which guides development organizations on how to properly manage microfinance projects. It also aims to help non-government organizations (NGOs) and communities in developing their own projects. Another is the Proceedings of the National Forum on Community Development which is a collection of best practices from the Program and fellow NGOs. It assists community-initiated development efforts and focuses on improving the economic development of rural areas. These programs support Australia's goal of helping the Philippines realize its economic potential.

=== Humanitarian assistance ===
Australia has always assisted the Philippine Government and its communities when it comes to preparing for, coping with and recovering from, and responding to natural disasters. Australia's aid program helped the Philippines with multi-hazard and risk mapping, updates to land use and contingency plans and zoning ordinances, establishment of early warning systems and emergency management teams in high-risk areas, monetary aid and humanitarian relief.

== Defence and security cooperation ==
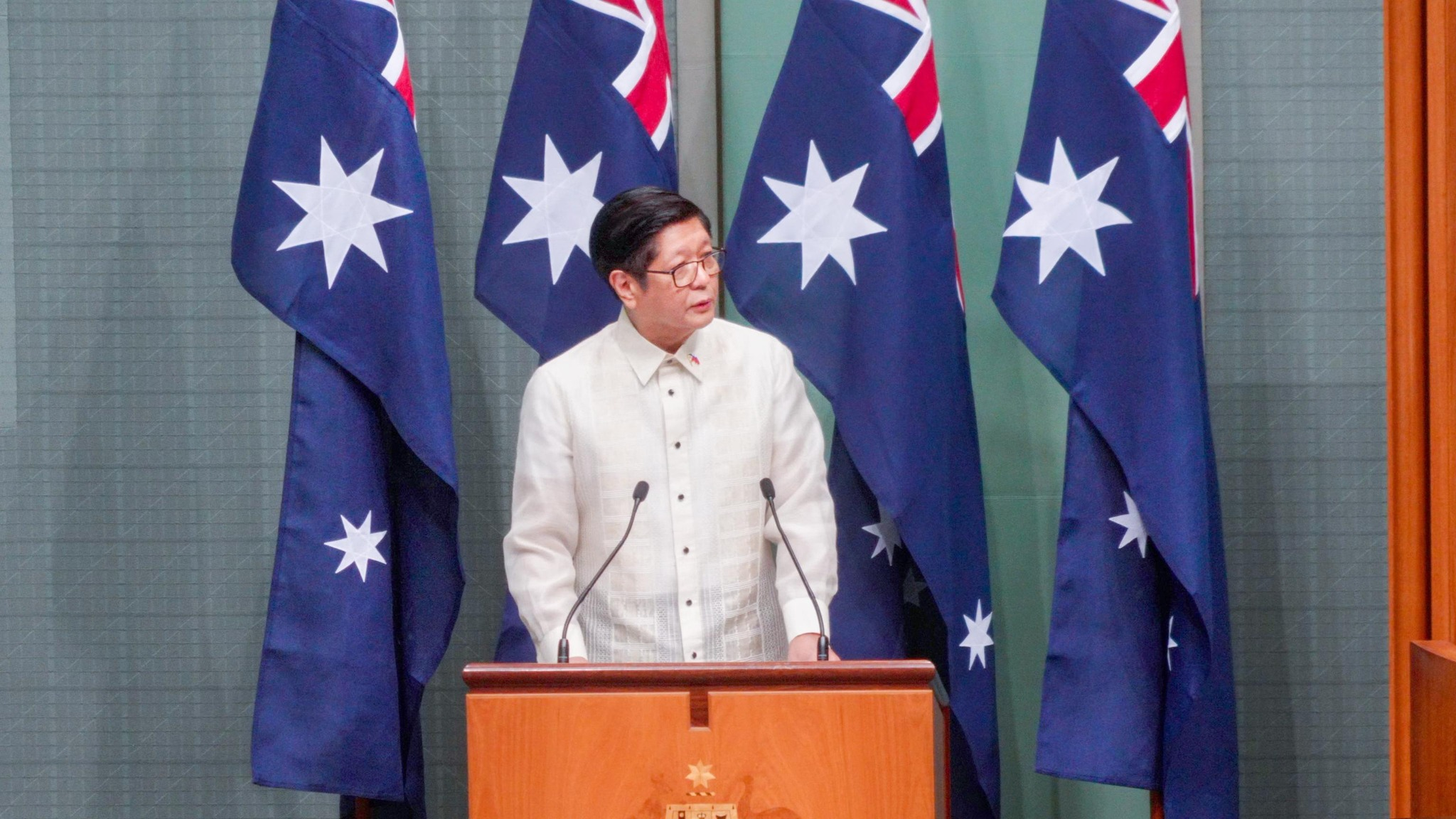
Philippine President Bongbong Marcos' address to the Parliament of Australia on 29 February 2024, the first by a Philippine leader, emphasized the bilateral defence cooperation.

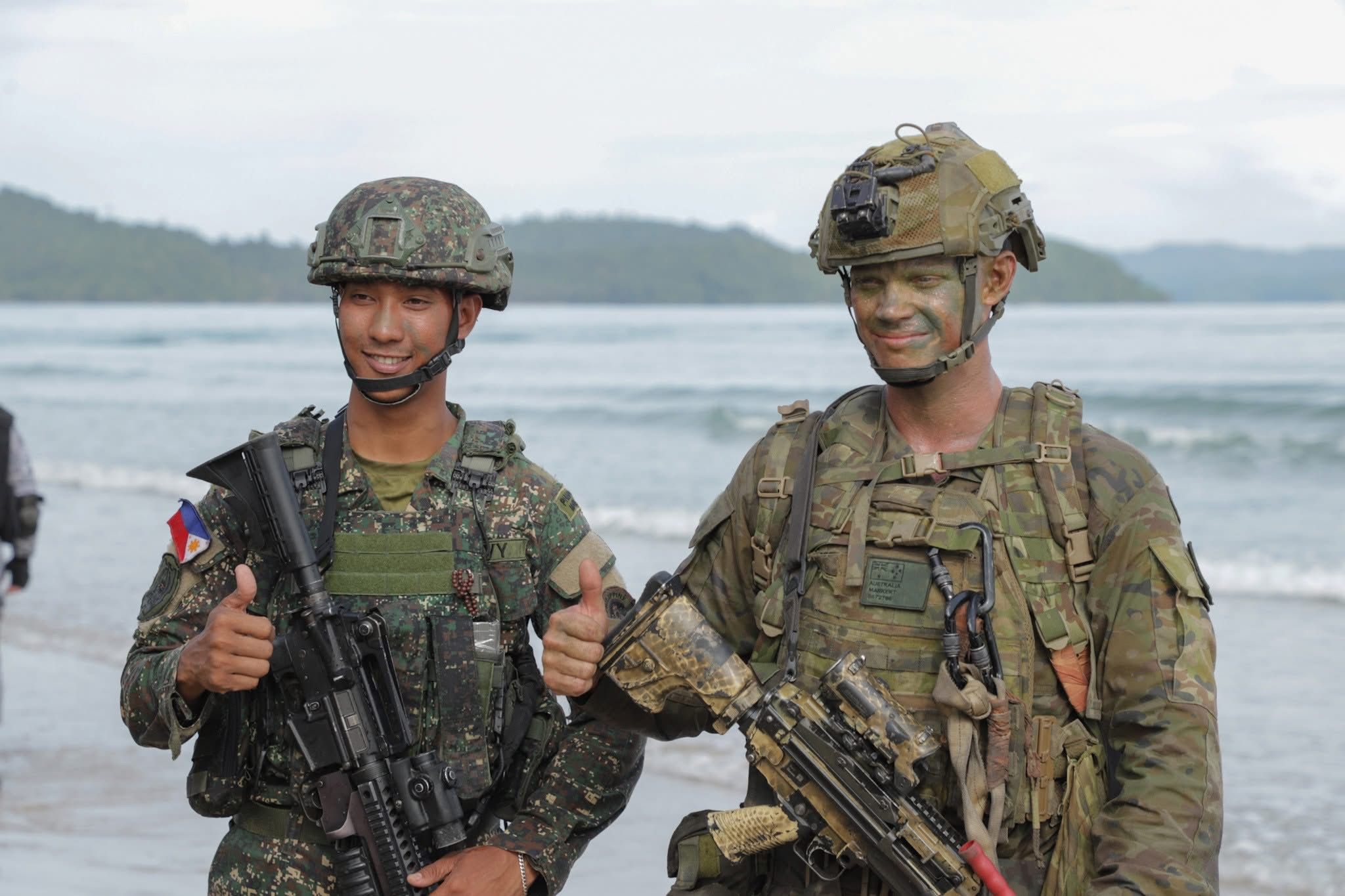
A Filipino and Australian soldier during a joint military exercise in San Vicente, Palawan, Philippines, August 2025

Philippine-Australia defence relations have flourished since World War II with regular dialogues to create mechanisms that would support the bilateral partnership. These mechanisms are the Philippines-Australia Ministerial Meeting (PAMM), Senior Officials Meeting (SOM), Philippine-Australia Bilateral Counter Terrorism Consultations (BCTC), High Level Consultations on Development Cooperation (HLC), Joint Defence Cooperation Committee (JDCC) and Defence Cooperation Working Group (DCWG) dialogues.

The Philippines and Australia, according to the preambles of SOVFA, has pursued the purpose and objectives of the Memorandum of Understanding between the two governments on Cooperative Defence Activities which was signed on 22 August 1995 in Canberra, Australia. It deliberated that cooperation between the Philippines and Australia promotes their common security interests and bearing in mind that from time to time, by arrangement between the Philippines and Australia, elements of the Forces of one Party may be sent to visit the territory of the other Party. SOFVA established the status of Visiting Forces of the Sending Party when in the territory of the Receiving Party; and acknowledged their intention in fulfilling their international commitments.

The Philippines has taken possession of three former Australian landing crafts. According to Philippine Navy spokesman Captain Lued Lincuna, three Balikpapan-class landing craft heavy (LCH) vessels were obtained by the Philippine government from Australia that arrived in Liloan, Cebu on 26 March around 10:30am. The three LCHs are former ships of the Royal Australian Navy and were formerly identified as HMAS Balikpapan (L-126), HMAS Wewak (L-130) and HMAS Betano (L-133). The LCHs are part of a set of five vessels that the Philippines acquired from Australia. The first two are the BRP Ivatan (formerly HMAS Tarakan) and BRP Batak (formerly HMAS Brunei) were donated and commissioned into the Philippine Navy (PN) last 2015, while the three newly arrived vessels were sold to Manila for a 'friendship price' of 270 million pesos.

The Status of Visiting Forces Agreement with Australia is an agreement that includes real-world issues including immigration and customs; measures for visiting forces to wear uniforms while in the other country; and criminal and civil jurisdiction over these visiting forces while in the other country. Australia and the Philippines signed the Agreement on 31 May 2007. Ratification of the Agreement by the Philippines was on 24 July 2012. The Philippine Senate passed the resolution for SOVFA on second reading with seven negative votes, on its last day of plenary sessions before the chamber's sine die adjournment. Australia has similar agreements with, among others, Malaysia, Papua New Guinea, Singapore and the US.

Australian Defence Force personnel participated in "Exercise BALIKATAN 2016", the foremost yearly multi-faceted exercise hosted by the Armed Forces of the Philippines and US Pacific Command. Exercise BALIKATAN 2016 included 86 ADF personnel, with major contributions which includes a 30-strong Special Forces element from the 2nd Commando Regiment. An RAAF AP-3C Orion maritime patrol aircraft and crew also joined in supporting maintenance personnel drawn from 92 Wing.

During Typhoon Haiyan, the Australian Government responded with the deployment of defence assets such as a C-17A Globemaster and a C-130J Super Hercules aircraft, and amphibious ship on humanitarian operation; and a two 37-member Australian Medical Assistance Team (AUSMAT), which established a 50-bed field hospital with surgical capability next to Tacloban Airport.

In August 2024, Australia, the Philippines, the USA and Canada conducted their first joint navy patrol in the South China Sea between the four countries, in a show of military strength and cooperation in the face of Chinese aggression.

=== Scholarships and PADSA ===
The Defence Cooperation Scholarship Program (DCSP) is an Australian program that caters scholarships to Defence personnel from targeted countries in the Asia-Pacific region to commence post-graduate studies in Australia. Filipinos such as former Chief of Staff of the Armed Forces of the Philippines General Gregorio Catapang are one of the alumni who graduated from the program. There is also the Philippines Australia Defense Scholars Association that is open to graduates of Australian Defence courses and Defence-sponsored training, and is for the promotion of fellowship amongst Australian military training graduates and Australian graduates of Philippine training. One member is Lieutenant General Roy Deveraturda who was responsible for the military support provided to the sinking of the Thomas Aquino Ferry, relief efforts for the 7.2 magnitude Bohol earthquake and responding to Typhoon Yolanda.

=== Law enforcement ===
Australian law enforcement agencies (LEA) have been working closely with their Philippine counterpart for over 30 years. Successful operational partnerships between the Australian and Philippine LEAs include joint international investigations into terrorist events such as the Makati bus bombing, the Glorietta Mall bombing and the Superferry bombing. AFP and Philippine LEAs frequently work together to dismantle major transnational drug and gun smuggling syndicates targeting both the Philippines and Australia, as well as identifying, disrupting and prosecuting numerous multinational child abuse syndicates. In 2015, Australian and Philippine LEA successfully dismantled an international paedophile ring in Mindanao by NBI with PNP and AFP support, gaining positive worldwide publicity for Philippine law enforcement in their fight against child abuse. A 60 Minutes program on this operation won a 2015 Walkley award. The success of the two countries' law enforcement cooperation is based on trust, mutual respect and common interests.

The Philippines has a treaty with Australia regarding assistance in criminal matters. This treaty is known as Australia-Philippines Mutual Legal Assistance Treaty. According to Article 1 of the Treaty, "The Contracting States shall, in accordance with the provisions of this Treaty, grant and provide to each other assistance in all matters relating to investigations or proceedings in respect of criminal matters." As part of joint international law enforcement operations, Australian and Philippine law enforcement agencies work together to defeat, disrupt and prevent transnational serious and organised criminal activity—including terrorism—in the South East Asian area.

Australia seeks to provide Philippine LEAs with training in global best-practice in human rights compliant investigative techniques. More than 1,800 Philippine law enforcement officers have undergone sponsored training in various law enforcement disciplines including applied management, intelligence reporting and analysis, investigations management, surveillance, hostage negotiation, counter terrorism operations, command & control, cognitive interviewing and critical incident management.

Australia's support to Philippine law enforcement includes a range of capacity building initiatives including training; construction and refurbishment of LEA establishments; and gifting of technical equipment, vehicles and surveillance equipment to Philippine LEAs.

In 2008, Australia funded the building of the Forensic Explosives Laboratory and Bomb Data Centre in Davao, Mindanao. This continues to provide world class counter-terrorism and counter IED work.

In 2012, Australia sponsored the establishment of the Cyber Counter Terrorism Team in Camp Crame, Manila.

In 2013, Australian Federal Police members deployed to Tacloban to assist the Philippines' response to Typhoon Yolanda. The Australian Federal Police gifts A$180,000 in radios and forensic supplies to the Philippine National Police, enhancing their capacity to respond to future mass casualty events.

In 2015, Australia sponsors the establishment of the joint Cyber Counter Terrorism Team in Zamboanga, Mindanao—providing training and state of the art computer systems and other necessary equipment

=== Child protection against online abuse ===
On 17 November 2015, the Australian Government launched a child protection program with the Philippine Department of Social Welfare and Development. The Australian Government provided $2 million to the Philippine Government and the Asia Foundation in support of the protection of children from online sexual abuse and exploitation and reduces the risk of children being exploited online. The program aims to help prosecute offenders, promote children's rights, advocate for stronger laws and create a sex offender registry and notification system. It will also develop an information and education campaign targeting identified sexual abuse hot spots.

The Australian Government has pledged Aus$2 million for a program that will defend children from online abuse and exploitation. During the Asia-Pacific Economic Cooperation, Australian Foreign Minister Julie Bishop announced the start of the implementation of the program in partnership with the Department of Social Welfare and Development, Department of Justice and the Asia Foundation. The Australian Embassy believes the program would support "an advocacy for child-friendly rules in family courts, the establishment of community-based multi-sectoral and local task forces in selected pilot areas, an audit of cases involving online child sexual abuse, and a public information and education campaign on the rights of children against online sexual abuse and exploitation."

=== Ports and airports infrastructure security ===
Together with Australia and Korea, the Philippines' Office for Transport Security (OTS) conducted a workshop on how airport design can help to develop security for staff, airlines and travellers. The Philippine Government allocated considerable funding for the improvement of 24 airports and the renovation of numerous international terminals across the country. These works are required to integrate new aviation security standards and infrastructure.

The Australian Department of Infrastructure and Regional Development hosted a forum in Manila to give information to airport operators and Philippine authorities about the International Civil Aviation Organization (ICAO) design standards and how they can be applied in an airport environment.

The Philippine Government, through the support of the Australian Government, held live simulation exercises at the Cebu International Port to check the synchronization and preparedness of local ports in handling security incidents. Former Australian Ambassador Rod Smith said the Philippine Office for Transportation Security (OTS), the Cebu Ports Authority, the Philippine Ports Authority and the Philippine Coast Guard participated in exercises involving simulated attacks to vital port facilities. The Philippines-Australia Port Security Capacity Building Project (PAPSCBP), funded by AusAID, was part of the A$10 million Counter-Terrorism Assistance Package to the Philippines from 2003 to 2010. The package aims to strengthen the capability of key government agencies to stop terrorist threats with a specific focus on law enforcement, border control, port security and regional cooperation.

The Philippines hosted the Asia Pacific Economic Cooperation (APEC) Summit 2015. The Office for Transportation Security (OTS) participated via proper implementation and coordination of security measures in various airports, seaports and land transport facilities. Australia was one of the countries who attended the event.

=== Cooperation on lawful migration ===
An important program between Australia and the Philippine Bureau of Immigration (BI) is their cooperation to counter people smuggling, human trafficking and other forms of illegal migration. The two countries signed a Memorandum of Understanding in 2005 to share expertise on effective border control to detect and deter human trafficking and other forms of irregular migration. Australia gifted new forensic document examination equipment and software to the Bureau of Immigration to shore up border security and improve the Bureau's capability to combat illegal migration, smuggling, human trafficking and terrorism. The equipment allowed the BI to set up new Document Examination Laboratories at three international terminals, Ninoy Aquino International Airport Terminal 2, Clark International Airport and Mactan-Cebu International Airport.

== People-to-people links ==
The Philippines and Australia have an increasing record when it comes to people-to-people links in trade, investment, cultural exchange, education and tourism.

=== ManilaMen ===
Filipinos in Australia arrived in the early 1900s. Some 700 were said to be working in the pearling industry and on trading ships.

The Manila men were Filipinos who made their way to the northern coast of Australia and found employment in Australia's pearling industry. Others Filipinos worked in Queensland's sugar cane plantations. Manila men established families in many settlements in places like Broome, Palmerston (now Darwin) Torres Strait islands and other states. Staying true to their Filipino heritage, they became a backbone of faith in their settlements. Some became important figures in the community. Heriberto Zarcal was a jeweler in Thursday Island and owned a hotel named Noli Me Tangere. Zarcal was one of Emilio Aguinaldo's links outside the Philippines throughout the period of the Philippine revolution through to after the declaration of the first Philippine Independence in 1898. He operated a fleet of pearling boats, all bearing names indicating Filipino patriotic and nationalistic sentiments.

In Broome, Shinju Matsuri (Festival of the Pearl) was celebrated in honor of the Filipinos who contributed to its prosperity. Majority of Australians are not aware of the 19th and early 20th century Manilamen's contributions to the cultural and economic infrastructure of Broome. Manila men built two Catholic churches in the early years, as was the now dismantled Old Jetty. Town Beach, the Old Jetty site, was a place where people gather for picnics, dine at the beach restaurant, swim, or observe at full moon from March through to October, the 'Staircase to the Moon' — "a visual display of the moon's reflection on the mudflats of Roebuck Bay that beams like a staircase to the sky." Few Filipinos became entrepreneurs like Filomeno 'Francis' Rodriguez who was a crew, diver and pearling master. His descendant, James Frederic Jahan de Lestang explained that Weld Club Hotel and the Continental Hotel were owned by his grandfather. Also, Filipinos are known for music. The Manila Club was established by the first Filipino settlers who provided entertainment in town. Through Filipino Catholic, Thomas Puertollano, and the guidance of a Cistercian Spanish priest, Fr Nicholas Emo, Filipinos were able to buy land and put up a fine hall. A great rondalla stringed orchestra was formed and was known as 'one of the finest in Australia.' Filipino lineage is deeply embedded in Broome's soil. New arrivals are proud with the history of the Manila men and their descendants.

=== Cultural, scientific and sporting cooperation ===
Australia and the Philippines celebrate a strong Indigenous heritage. Australia has the National Aboriginal and Islander Day Observance Committee (NAIDOC) Week in July to the achievements of Aboriginal and Torres Strait Islander peoples. This also highlights Australia's support for other Indigenous cultures, including in the Philippines.

Australian assistance to Philippine Indigenous peoples has helped improve education with the implementation of indigenized curriculum in Mindanao. Since 2006, the DAP has provided approximately Php4 million to programs which contribute to Indigenous peoples' welfare and income-generating capacity.

For science, the Australian Government launched its 'Scientists in Schools' initiative at the University of the Philippines-Manila including a talk by renowned Australian scientist and cervical cancer vaccine developer Professor Ian Frazer. The initiative is likened to a similar project by Australia's science agency, the Commonwealth Scientific and Industrial Research Organisation, wherein it promoted science education in primary and secondary schools with the help of Australian scientists. The Australian Government has always been a partner to the Philippines that has devoted considerably in education. Around Php 2 billion, or almost half of Australia's current bilateral development program, is allocated in improving access and quality of education in the Philippines, and to providing scholarships to a lot of Filipinos to pursue higher education in Australia.

The Philippines and Australia are passionate sports fans, especially when it comes to basketball. The Pilipinas 16 & Under National Youth Basketball Team of the Samahang Basketbol ng Pilipinas visited Canberra to practice at the Australian Institute of Sport (AIS), known as Australia's "world-leading elite sports development institute." The 10-day training camp enabled the team to prepare for future international tournaments. It included a small tournament led by National Intensive Training Centre Program head coach Rob Beveridge wherein the Philippine team competed against teams from Australian states. The future goal of the program is to have more training camps and pocket tournaments that will be held yearly in Canberra.

In football, A-League side Perth Glory F.C. visited the Philippines for their pre-season tour. The team faced United Football League (UFL) club, Global F.C., in a goalless draw, a 2–1 victory over a selection of stars from the UFL and won 2–0 against the Philippines' national team, the Philippine Azkals.

=== Colombo Plan scholars ===
The New Colombo Plan is an updated initiative of the Australian Government which aims to provide academic help to those in the Indo-Pacific region. Its goal is to deepen Australia's ties in the region as well as helping scholars in fellow countries. On 10 September 2014, Australian Ambassador to the Philippines Bill Tweddell discussed the New Colombo Plan to Filipino education officials. The Philippines is an original partner of the Colombo Plan. On 20 April 2015, the New Colombo Plan was launched in the Philippines.

=== New Colombo Plan ===
The New Colombo Plan is a trademark program of the Australian Government which targets to boost knowledge of the Indo-Pacific in Australia by supporting Australian undergraduate students to study and undertake internships in the region. It inspires a two-way flow of students between Australia and the rest of our region, which complement the thousands of students from the region coming to Australia to study each year. The New Colombo Plan is planned to be transformational, it expanded Australia's relationships in the region, both at the individual level and through expanding university, business and other links.

=== Australia global alumni ===
There is the Philippine Australian Alumni Association, Inc which organizes activities that promote mutual understanding between Australia and the Philippines. The association supports business networking and socializing among alumni of Australian education and training institutes.

One of the program's alumni is Martin Andanar, a journalist who completed a Bachelor of Arts in Social and Political Studies, majoring in Film and Media Studies at Federation University in Victoria. He later became Secretary of the Presidential Communications Operating Office.

=== Immigration ===
One important component of this relationship between the Philippines and Australia is immigration. A huge number of Filipinos have immigrated to Australia since the 1960s and they have a very large community in the country.

In 1987–88, Australia has the third largest migration area for Filipinos after the United Kingdom and New Zealand. Since then, Filipinos have a growing ethnic minority population in Australia. The first wave included Filipinos of Spanish descent when Australia opened its doors to immigrants who did not differ much from the European immigrants.

The second wave came from the emigration of families as more Australians and Filipinos marry and settle in Australia. Later, immigration came from relatives who have been sponsored to come to Australia. Filipino-Australians have a high ratio of two-parent families with children, and a low ratio with non-dependent children living with them, compared to the Australian average.

In 2011, it is said that 225,000 Australians claim that they have Filipino lineage, an increase from 129,000 in 2001. The Australian Parliament even has an Australia-Philippines Parliament Group wherein its members participate in exchanges to know and examine the history, culture and politics of the Philippines.

== Study destination ==
Australia is one of the leading countries in terms of education. Its well-developed education system has attracted millions of international students to study in Australia, especially Filipino students.

In June 2011, the Australian Government announced a new brand, the "Future Unlimited" to promote Australian education internationally. It identifies the importance of having an international education as a catalyst for a better future. Future Unlimited revolutionizes Australian education as it emphasizes on the outcomes of an Australian education. This showcases the global significance, practicality and quality of Australian academic institutions. Future Unlimited reassures families that their return of investment in an Australian education is in the form of a better future with an internationally recognised program, qualifications and skills.

The official government web site about studying in Australia is www.studyinaustralia.gov.au. The site has a "search facility covering all the courses and institutions available to international students seeking a student visa for Australian study." The site also links to varieties in major languages and provides contact details in different regions. The Australian Government has Australian Education Centres in selected regions.

In the Philippines, Australian qualifications are recognised by leading professional associations and employers in the country and abroad.

In the Philippines, the Australian Trade Commission (Austrade) is promoting Australian education with the "Study in Australia" campaign. Austrade is responsible for encouraging and organizing exhibits participated in by Australian colleges, universities and institutions. On Facebook, Austrade accepts comments and posts on the Study in Australia Facebook Page.

=== Protection of foreign students ===
There are a lot of international students, especially Filipinos, studying in Australia because of its well-developed education system and world class universities. The Australian Government has made it a point to protect its international students. The Education Services for Overseas Students Act 2000 (ESOS Act) provides legislative requirements and standards for the regulation of education and training institutions offering courses to international students in Australia on a student visa. In short, ESOS provides tuition protection for international students. The goal of ESOS is to protect the interest of international students and enhance Australia's track record when it comes to education.

== Resident diplomatic missions ==
of Australia in the Philippines

- Manila (Embassy)

of the Philippines in Australia

- Canberra (Embassy)
- Melbourne (Consulate-General)
- Sydney (Consulate-General)

Building hosting the Embassy of Australia in Manila

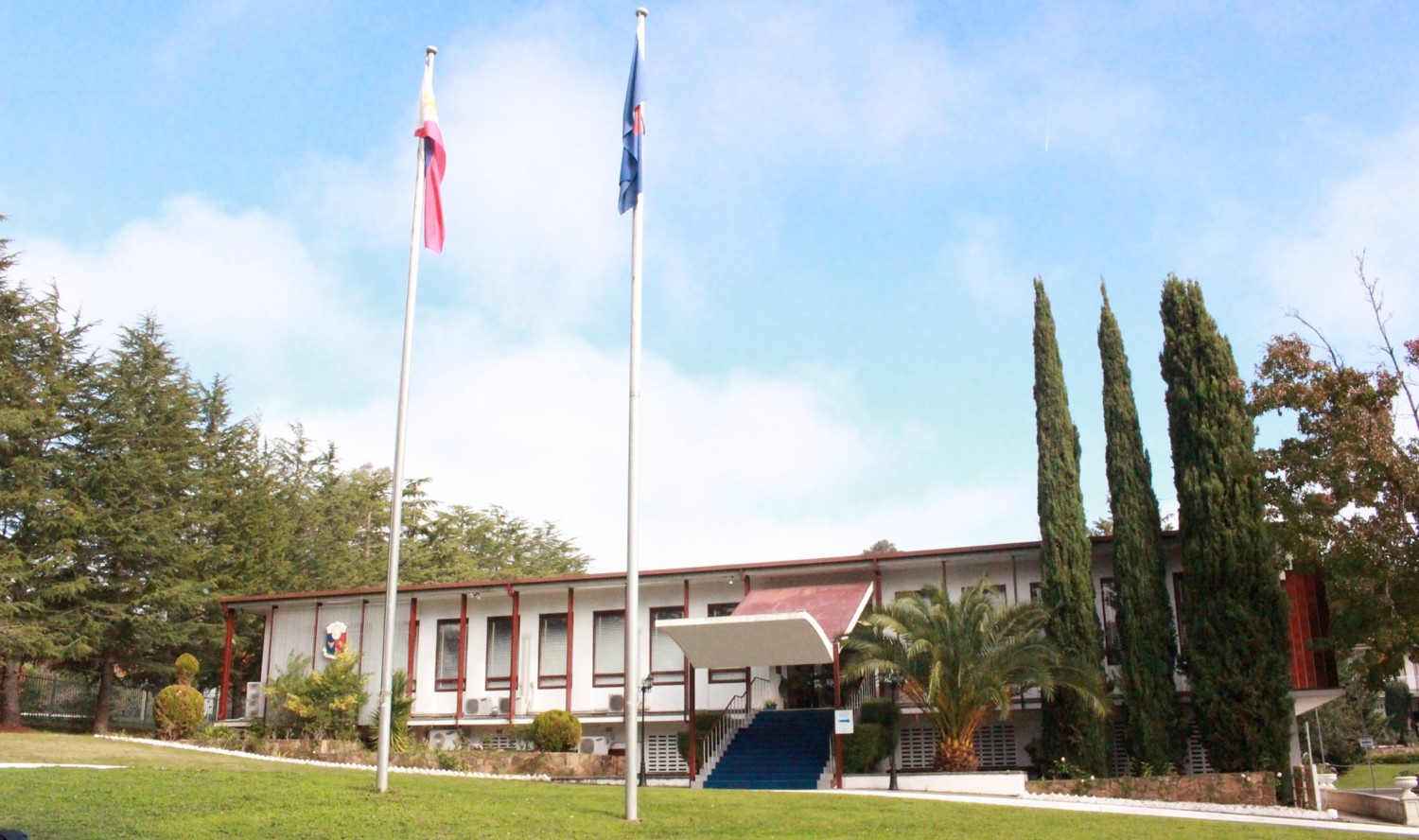
Embassy of the Philippines in Canberra

== See also ==
- Filipino Australian
- Foreign relations of Australia
- Foreign relations of Philippines
- List of ambassadors of Australia to the Philippines
