= List of ambassadors of the Philippines to Australia =

Ambassador of the Republic of the Philippines to the Commonwealth of Australia
- Sugo ng Republika ng Pilipinas sa Komonwelt ng Australya
- Seal of the Department of Foreign Affairs of the Philippines

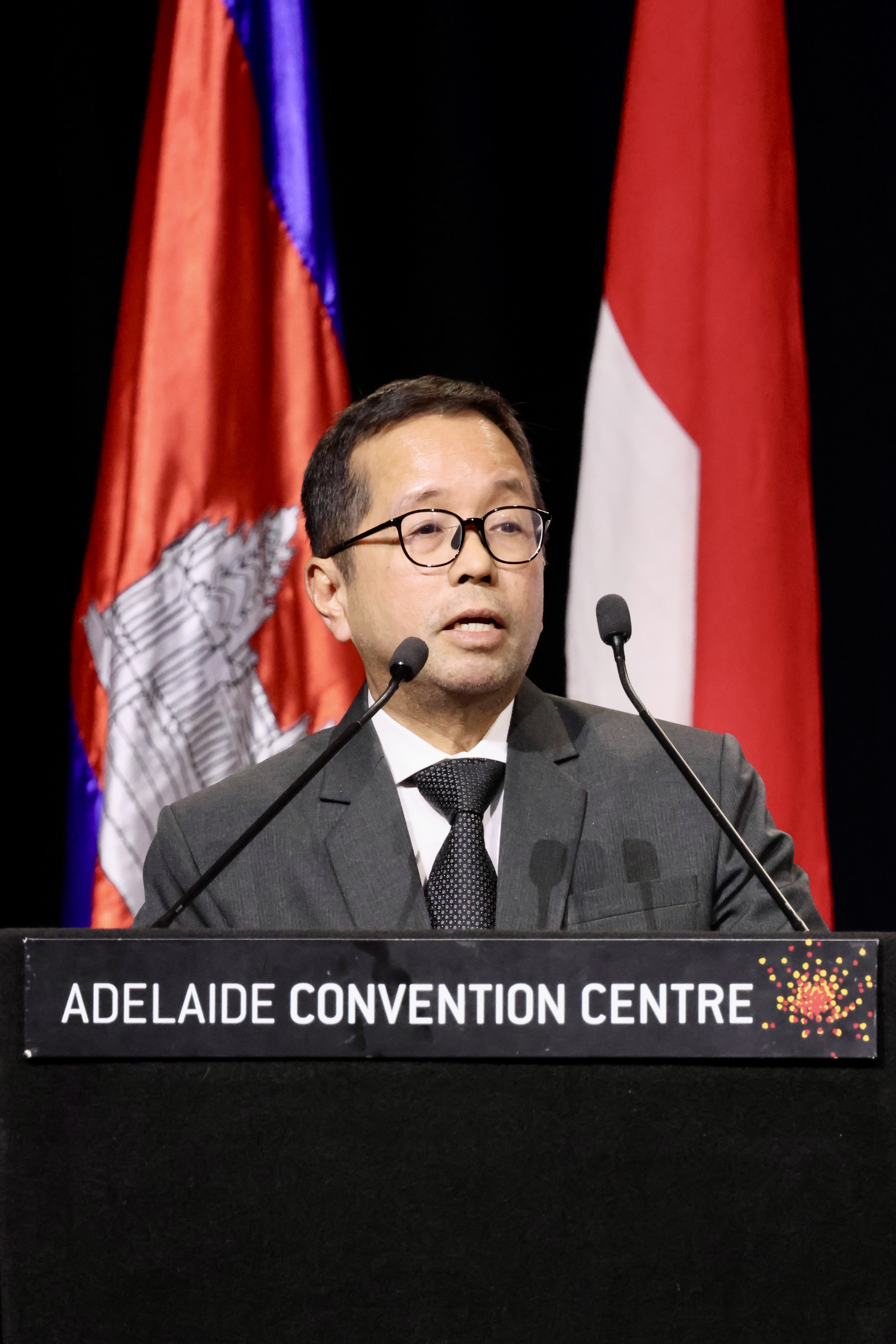
- Incumbent; Antonio A. Morales since December 4, 2024
- Department of Foreign Affairs; Embassy of the Philippines, Canberra
- Style: Her Excellency
- Reports to: Department of Foreign Affairs
- Seat: Canberra, Australia
- Nominator: Secretary of Foreign Affairs
- Appointer: President of the Philippines; with the advice and consent of the Commission on Appointments
- Term length: No fixed term
- Inaugural holder: Roberto Regala
- Formation: July 8, 1949
- Website: Philippine Embassy, Canberra

The ambassador of the Republic of the Philippines to the Commonwealth of Australia (Filipino: Sugo ng Republika ng Pilipinas sa Komonwelt ng Australya) is the Republic of the Philippines' foremost diplomatic representative in the Commonwealth of Australia. As head of the Philippines' diplomatic mission there, the ambassador is the official representative of the president and the government of the Philippines to the governor-general and the government of Australia. The position has the rank and status of an ambassador extraordinary and plenipotentiary and is based at the embassy located in Canberra.

Although the diplomatic relations between the two countries were established on July 4, 1946, this diplomatic post was established on July 8, 1949, under the rank of a consul general (later, minister), and the rank of ambassador extraordinary and plenipotentiary was later officially elevated in 1956. The Philippine ambassador to Australia also serves as the non-resident ambassador to the countries of Nauru, Tuvalu, and Vanuatu.

== List of heads of mission ==
Image	Ambassador	Tenure	Australian monarch	Australian governor-general	Australian prime minister	Philippine president	Remarks
	Roberto Regala	1949–1956	George VI; Elizabeth II	Sir William McKell; Sir William Slim	Ben Chifley; Robert Menzies	Elpidio Quirino; Ramon Magsaysay	Credentials were presented on January 24, 1956.
	Jose Imperial	1956–1960	Elizabeth II	Sir William Slim; William Morrison, 1st Viscount Dunrossil	Robert Menzies; Harold Holt; John McEwen; John Gorton	Ramon Magsaysay; Carlos P. Garcia	
	Mariano Ezpeleta	1960–1970	Elizabeth II	William Morrison, 1st Viscount Dunrossil; William Sidney, 1st Viscount De L'Isle; Richard Casey, Baron Casey; Sir Paul Hasluck	Robert Menzies; Harold Holt; John McEwen; John Gorton	Carlos P. Garcia; Diosdado Macapagal; Ferdinand Marcos	
	Gregorio Abad	1971–1977	Elizabeth II	Sir Paul Hasluck; Sir John Kerr; Sir Zelman Cowen	John Gorton; William McMahon; Gough Whilam; Malcolm Fraser	Ferdinand Marcos	
	Leticia Ramos-Shahani	1978–1980	Elizabeth II	Sir Zelman Cowen; Sir Ninian Stephen; Bill Hayden	John Gorton; William McMahon; Gough Whilam; Malcolm Fraser	Ferdinand Marcos	
	Monico R. Vicente	1982–1986	Elizabeth II	Sir Zelman Cowen; Sir Ninian Stephen; Bill Hayden	Malcolm Fraser; Bob Hawke; Paul Keating	Ferdinand Marcos; Corazon Aquino	
	Romualdo A. Ong	1986–1989	Elizabeth II	Sir Zelman Cowen; Sir Ninian Stephen; Bill Hayden	Malcolm Fraser; Bob Hawke; Paul Keating	Corazon Aquino; Fidel V. Ramos	
	Rora Navarro-Tolentino	1989–1994	Elizabeth II	Sir Zelman Cowen; Sir Ninian Stephen; Bill Hayden	Malcolm Fraser; Bob Hawke; Paul Keating	Corazon Aquino; Fidel V. Ramos	
	Delia Domingo-Albert	1994–2002	Elizabeth II	Bill Hayden; Sir William Deane; Peter Hollingworth	Paul Keating; John Howard	Fidel V. Ramos; Joseph Estrada; Gloria Macapagal Arroyo	
	Willy C. Gaa	2002–2003	Elizabeth II	Peter Hollingworth; Michael Jeffery	Paul Keating; John Howard	Gloria Macapagal Arroyo	
	Cristina G. Ortega	2004–2006	Elizabeth II	Peter Hollingworth; Michael Jeffery	Paul Keating; John Howard	Gloria Macapagal Arroyo	
	Ernesto De Leon	2006–2010	Elizabeth II	Michael Jeffery; Dame Quentin Bryce; Sir Peter Cosgrove	Kevin Rudd; Julia Gilliard; Kevin Rudd; Tony Abbott; Malcolm Turnbull; Scott Morrison	Gloria Macapagal Arroyo; Benigno Aquino III	
	Belen F. Anota	2011–2015	Elizabeth II	Michael Jeffery; Dame Quentin Bryce; Sir Peter Cosgrove	Kevin Rudd; Julia Gilliard; Kevin Rudd; Tony Abbott; Malcolm Turnbull; Scott Morrison	Gloria Macapagal Arroyo; Benigno Aquino III	
	Minda Calaguian-Cruz	2016–2018	Elizabeth II	Michael Jeffery; Dame Quentin Bryce; Sir Peter Cosgrove	Kevin Rudd; Julia Gilliard; Kevin Rudd; Tony Abbott; Malcolm Turnbull; Scott Morrison	Benigno Aquino III; Rodrigo Duterte	
	Ma. Hellen De La Vega	2018–2024	Elizabeth II; Charles III	Sir Peter Cosgrove; David Hurley; Sam Mostyn	Scott Morrison; Anthony Albanese	Rodrigo Duterte; Bongbong Marcos	Appointment confirmed by Commission on Appointments on August 15, 2018. Credentials were presented on November 29, 2018.
	Antonio A. Morales	2024–	Charles III	Sam Mostyn	Anthony Albanese	Bongbong Marcos	Appointment confirmed by Commission on Appointments on August 7, 2024. Credentials were presented on December 4, 2024.
Source: Embassy of the Republic of the Philippines, Canberra
