= Lauren Reid =

Filipino-Australian actress

- Born: Lauren Danielle Reid (Note: Lauren Reid was born in Australia. Thus, she does not possess her mother's maiden name which is Marquinez.); April 16, 1993 (age 32); Zamboanga City, Philippines
- Occupations: Model, Actress, Events and Television Host, Blogger,
- Years active: 2016–present
- Agent: MAIN: (2016–Present) Viva Entertainment Korean Freelanced: Koffeedream Management

Lauren Danielle Reid (Hangul: 로렌레이드) (born April 16, 1993) is a Filipino-Australian model, actress, events and television host, and blogger with dual Filipino and Australian citizenship. She began her professional career in modelling in 2016 with the influence of her brother James Reid. On July 1, 2016, she joined her current entertainment agency Viva Entertainment since then she has been on major magazine covers in the Philippines.

Lauren is currently expanding her career not just in the Philippines, but also exploring the world of K-pop & Korean entertainment by joining Koffeedream Artist in their upcoming world tours. She will be known as 로렌레이드

Lauren is also known to influence her fans in staying fit and healthy. In her blog (Instagram) laurenreidabook. she was able to encourage her followers to eat healthily exercise frequently and recently she challenged her followers to do 30 days sugar-free challenge.

== Radio ==
| Year | Radio | Role |
|---|---|---|
| 2016 | Magic 89.9 | Guest DJ |
| 2017 | Monster RX Radio | Guest DJ |

== Events ==
| Year | Event | Role |
|---|---|---|
| 2016 | Ms World Coronation Night | Co-Host |
| 2016 | Fuji Film Philippines Launch | Special Guest |
| 2016 | G-Force Project 2016 | Dance Performer |
| 2017 | GNC Philippines | Special Guest |
| 2017 | TV100PH Hotlist Yacht Party | Special Guest |
| 2017 | Ayala Cinema Malls opening | Host |
| 2017 | Manila X Style + Music Festival | Catwalk Model |
| 2017 | Sept 15 Richmond USA KDM Fanmeeting | Special Guest Fanmeeting Co-Host |
| 2017 | Sept 16 40th Korean Festival of Maryland USA | Special Guest Fanmeeting Co-Host |
| 2017 | Hot Shot Brandy Launch at Valkyrie | Ambassador/Endorser |
| 2017 | Hot Shot Brandy Hottest Party in Pangasinan | Ambassador/Endorser |
| 2018 | Whispher: Choose Curvalicious | Special Guest |
| 2018 | Manila X | Catwalk Model for Folded & Hung |

== T.V. and Cinema ==
| Year | Program | Episode | Role |
|---|---|---|---|
| 2016 | Juan Half TFC TV | Sept | Special Guest |
| 2017 | Starworld Food Trip | May | Special Guest |
| 2017 | Family Feud Philippines | May | Player (Nadine Lustre Team) |
| 2017 | Tadhana: Love Rehab | Nov | as Avery |
| 2018 | Halik | Jul | Special Guest |
| 2019 | Ulan | Mar | Special Guest |

== Ambassador & endorser ==
| Year | Brand |
|---|---|
| 2018-Current | Converse |
| 2016-Current | Folded & Hung |
| 2016 | SM Megamall |
| 2016 | Krispy Kreme Philippines |
| 2016 | Folded & Hung Star Wars Rogue |
| 2017-2018 | Skin101 |
| 2017-Current | GAOC Dental |
| 2017-2018 | LG Philippines brand |
| 2017 | SM Parisian |
| 2017-Current | Nike Philippines brand |
| 2017 | HP Sprocket Photo Printer |
| 2017-2018 | Eyewear Mujosh brand |
| 2017-2018 | Emperador Hot Shot Brandy |
| 2017-2018 | L'Oréal |

== Newspaper and Magazine ==
| Year | Month Issue | Magazine |
|---|---|---|
| 2016 | July | Inside ShowBiz |
| 2016 | July | Cosmopolitan PH |
| 2016 | August | Escape Magazine |
| 2016 | August | Philippines Star Supreme |
| 2016 | August | Preview Magazine Front Cover |
| 2016 | September | Cosmopolitan PH |
| 2016 | September | Mega Style Philippines Front Cover |
| 2016 | September | Preview Magazine |
| 2016 | September | Starstyle Magazine |
| 2016 | October – December | Chalk Magazine |
| 2016 | November | StarStyle Magazine |
| 2016 | November – December | SCOUT Cover model |
| 2016 | December | Mega Magazine Front Cover |
| 2016 | December | SM Supermalls Shopmag frontcover |
| 2017 | January | Style Weekend front cover |
| 2017 | | Metro Magazine Philippines |
| 2017 | | Mega Millennials Magazine |
| 2017 | | Preview Magazine |
| 2017 | June | Rouge Front cover |
| 2018 | August | Cosmopolitan |
| 2018 | August | The Philippine Star |
