= Filipino Australians =

Australian citizens of Filipino ancestry

Filipino Australians Mga Australyanong Pilipino

Total population
- 408,836 by ancestry (2021 census) (1.6% of the Australian population); 300,620 born in the Philippines (2021)

Regions with significant populations
- Sydney, Melbourne, Perth, Brisbane, Adelaide

Languages
- Australian English, Tagalog, Visayan languages (Cebuano, Hiligaynon), Kapampangan, Pangasinan, Ilocano, other Philippine languages

Religion
- Roman Catholicism · Protestantism · Irreligion

Related ethnic groups
- Filipino people, Overseas Filipinos, Filipino Americans, Filipino Canadians

Filipino Australians (Filipino: Mga Australyanong Pilipino) are Australians of Filipino ancestry. Filipino Australians are one of the largest groups within the global Filipino diaspora. At the 2021 census, 408,836 people stated that they had Filipino ancestry (whether alone or in combination with another ancestry), representing 1.6% of the Australian population. In 2021, the Australian Bureau of Statistics estimated that there were 310,620 Australian residents born in the Philippines.

== Population ==
People born in the Philippines as a percentage of the population in Sydney divided geographically by postal area, as of the 2011 census

Currently Filipinos are the third-largest Asian Australian immigrant group, behind Chinese Australians and Indian Australians. At the 2021 census, 408,836 people stated that they had Filipino ancestry (whether alone or in combination with another ancestry), representing 1.6% of the Australian population. In 2021, the Australian Bureau of Statistics estimated that there were 310,620 Australian residents born in the Philippines.

At the 2021 census, the states with the largest numbers of people reporting Filipino ancestry were: New South Wales (152,804), Victoria (95,186), Queensland (73,805), Western Australia (46,785) and South Australia (21,257).

Females account for 61%, while males represent 39% of Filipino Australians born in the Philippines.

== History ==
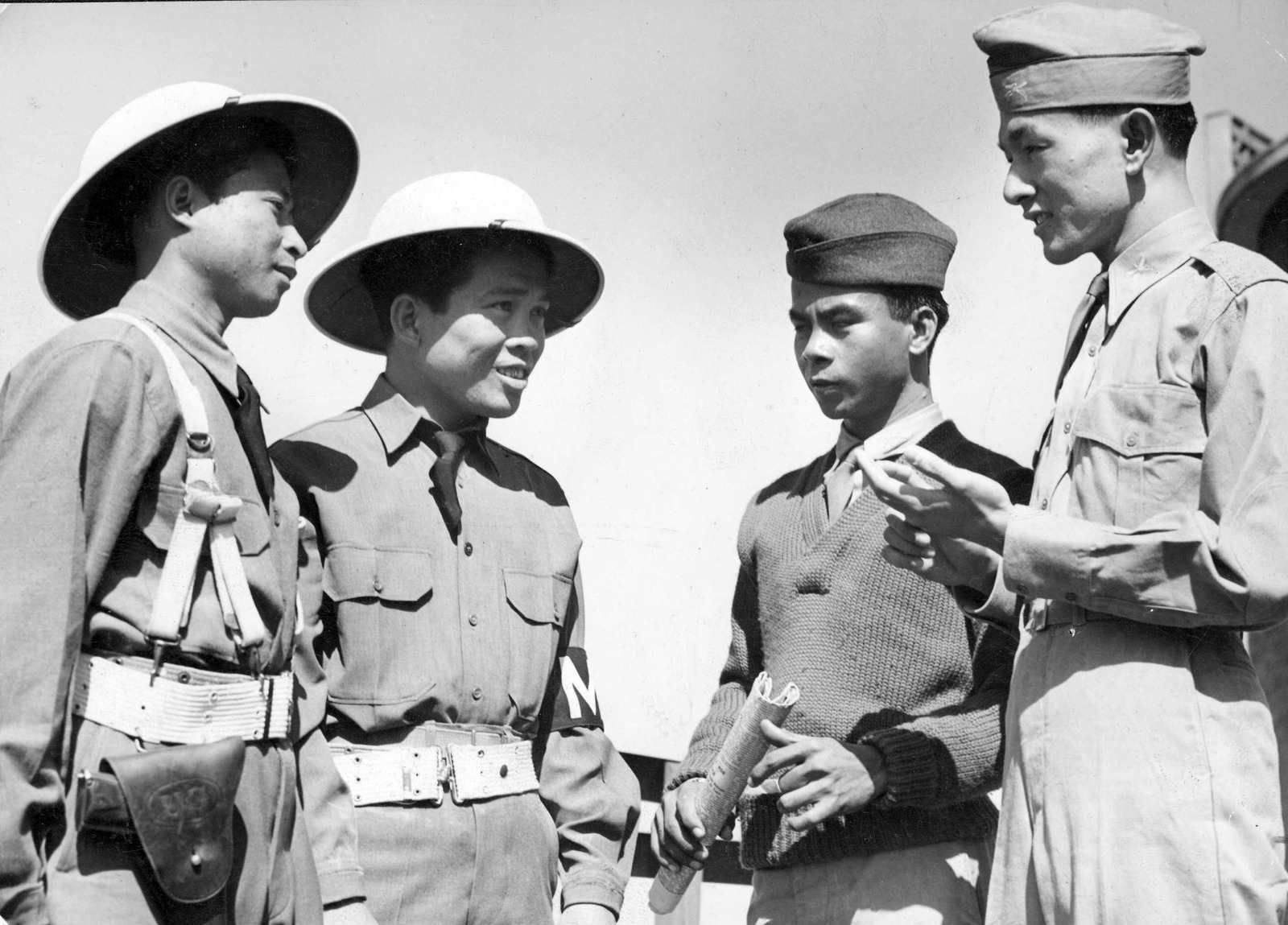
Filipino Australian Army soldiers in Victoria, 1941

During the 1800s until the early 20th century, Broome became the pearling capital of the world. Filipinos worked as divers, crew, shell openers, and sorters. Eventually, they married with local women in Broome.

Filipinos were excluded from entering Australia under the White Australia policy. As a consequence, until the abolition of racially selective immigration policies in 1966 their numbers in Australia remained minimal – confined to descendants of those few Filipinos who had migrated to the north-west pearling areas of Western Australia and the sugar cane plantations of Queensland prior to 1901. The 1901 census had recorded 700 Filipinos in Australia.

The number of permanent settlers arriving in Australia from the Philippines since 1991 (monthly)

Martial law in the Philippines, declared in 1972 by Philippine president Ferdinand Marcos, and the renunciation of the White Australia policy made Australia an attractive destination for Filipino emigrants, particularly skilled workers. Many Filipinos also settled in Australia from the 1970s onward as either migrant workers or the spouses of Australian citizens. Marriages between Filipinos and Australians rose very sharply from 1978, peaked in 1986, and remained high as of 2000, despite a dip in the early 1990s. The 1980s were the period of the greatest Filipino immigration, with 1987–1988 being the peak year.

== Media ==
The Philippine Times is Victoria's longest-running community paper. The first edition was published in November 1990.

== Notable people ==
=== Philippine-born ===
- Aljin Abella, actor from the TV series Power Rangers Jungle Fury
- Migo Adecer, singer, dancer, model, and actor
- Alyssa Alano, actress and model
- Leila Alcasid, singer and songwriter
- Joey Mead King, model, VJ, and TV and events host
- Shar Mae Amor, singer and former Paradiso Girls member
- Hannah Arnold, model and beauty queen, crowned Binibining Pilipinas 2021
- Mig Ayesa, theatre actor and rock vocalist
- Merlinda Bobis, writer
- Shey Bustamante, reality show contestant
- Arianne Caoili, chess player
- Israel Cruz, singer
- Kathleen de Leon Jones, original Hi-5 member
- Ashley del Mundo, actress and former reality show contestant
- Felino Dolloso, theatre actor
- Ben Gonzales, rugby league player
- Sef Gonzales, convicted murderer
- Nathalie Hart, actress
- Fely Irvine, former Hi-5 member
- Jal Joshua, singer, dancer, and Australia's Got Talent Season 3 1st runner-up
- Alfred Nicdao, actor
- Kylie Padilla, actress, singer and model
- Jim Paredes, singer, songwriter, member of APO Hiking Society trio
- Rose Porteous, socialite
- RJ Rosales, actor and musical theatre performer
- Claire Ruiz, actress, singer, dancer, and model
- Guillermo Capati, civil and environmental engineer

=== Filipino ancestry ===
- Ridge Barredo, Married at First Sight Australia Season 11 star
- Chris Cayzer, actor and singer
- Kate Ceberano, singer
- Genesis Cerezo, beatboxer and Australia's Got Talent Season 6 finalist
- Sarah Christophers, former actress
- Elizabeth Clenci, model and beauty queen, Miss Grand International 2017 2nd runner-up
- Jessica Connelly, singer and former reality show contestant
- Anne Curtis, actress, model, and singer
- Jasmine Curtis-Smith, actress and model
- Daine, singer
- Rod Davies, wing for Queensland Reds Super Rugby team
- Jason Day, golfer
- Karen Gallman, model and beauty queen crowned Binibining Pilipinas Intercontinental 2018 and Miss Intercontinental 2018
- Ylona Garcia, singer
- Kevin Gordon, Gold Coast Titans Rugby League player
- Catriona Gray, singer and model crowned Miss World Philippines 2016, Miss Universe Philippines 2018 and Miss Universe 2018
- Payne Haas, Brisbane Broncos Rugby League player
- Jasmine Henry, singer and member of Filipino girl group, G22
- Mojo Juju, musician
- Clinton Kane, singer
- Kelebek, rapper, The X Factor Australia Season 5 finalist, and former Third Degree member
- Michael Letts, rugby player
- Jericho Malabonga, winner of the fourth series of Australian Survivor
- Reyanna Maria, singer and rapper
- Janette McBride, former actress
- Michael McCoy, reality show contestant
- Reef McInnes, Australian rules footballer
- Natalie Mendoza, actress (Hotel Babylon)
- Rebecca Jackson Mendoza, actress, singer, and dancer
- Paul Merciadez, singer, dancer, and member of dance group Justice Crew
- Patrick Miller, Married at First Sight Australia Season 5 star
- Montaigne, singer
- Seann Miley Moore, singer, The X Factor U.K. Season 12 finalist, and The Voice Australia Season 10 contestant
- Kenneth Moraleda, director & actor
- Bobby Morley, actor from Home and Away and The 100 TV series
- Charlotte Nicdao, actress
- Cyrell Paule, Married at First Sight Australia Season 6 star
- John Pearce, singer, dancer, member of Justice Crew, and member of children's music group The Wiggles
- Lenny Pearce, singer, dancer, and member of Justice Crew
- Mick Pennisi, basketball player
- Marlisa Punzalan, winner of the sixth series of The X Factor Australia
- Iain Ramsay, professional football (soccer) player. Has chosen to represent the Philippines national football team at the international level.
- Amy Reeves, 1st runner-up of the ninth series of Australian Idol
- James Reid, actor, singer, and dancer
- Lauren Reid, model, actress, events and television host, and blogger
- Sheldon Riley, singer, 2022 Australian Eurovision representative, The Voice Australia Season 7 2nd runner-up, The X Factor Australia Season 8 finalist
- Nina Robertson, beauty queen crowned Miss Earth Australia 2017
- Nicole Schmitz, beauty queen and model crowned Binibining Pilipinas 2012, Miss International 2012 Top 15 finalist
- Naomi Sequeira, actress and singer, Hanging with Adam & Naomi, The Evermoor Chronicles
- Monique Shippen, model, singer and beauty queen crowned Miss Earth Australia 2018 and Miss International Australia 2019
- Flip Simmons, theatre actor and musician
- Starley, singer
- Calmell Teagle, The X Factor Australia Season 8 finalist, member of pop duo band, Cat & Calmell
- Melanie Vallejo, actress from the TV series Power Rangers: Mystic Force
- Michelle Vergara Moore, actress from the TV series The Time of Our Lives
- Matthew Victor Pastor, film director
- Iya Villania, singer, actress and model
- Cyrus Villanueva, winner of the seventh series of The X Factor Australia
- Craig Wing, Australian Rugby League player (South Sydney Rabbitohs)
- Breanna Yde, actress and singer from School of Rock and Malibu Rescue
- Gwen Zamora, actress and model
- BJ Pridham, Member of Planetshakers (Acoustic Guitarist/Worship Leader/Vocalist & Keys)

== See also ==
- Australia–Philippines relations
- Embassy of the Philippines, Canberra
- Filipino diaspora
- Immigration to Australia
- Filipino New Zealanders
