= Delia Albert =

Filipina career diplomat

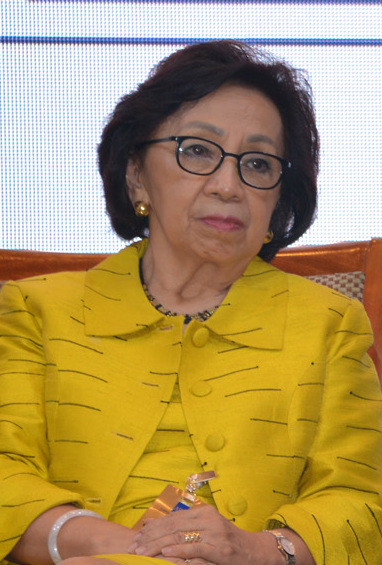
- Albert at an Asian Development Bank-Philippine Institute for Development Studies book launch, June 20, 2017

23rd Secretary of Foreign Affairs
- In office December 22, 2003 – August 18, 2004
- President: Gloria Macapagal Arroyo
- Preceded by: Blas Ople
- Succeeded by: Alberto Romulo

Ambassador of the Philippines to Australia
- In office October 1994 – January 2002
- President: Fidel V. Ramos; Joseph Estrada; Gloria Macapagal Arroyo
- Preceded by: Rora N. Tolentino
- Succeeded by: Willy C. Gaa

Personal details
- Born: Delia Domingo; August 11, 1942 (age 83) Baguio, Benguet, Philippines
- Profession: Diplomat, Public Servant

Delia Domingo Albert (born August 11, 1942) is a Filipina career diplomat who served as the first female and 23rd Philippine Secretary of Foreign Affairs from December 22, 2003 to August 18, 2004. She was also the first woman career diplomat to serve as foreign minister of a Southeast Asian country.

== Career ==
Albert received a bachelor's degree in international relations from the University of the Philippines Diliman before studying at a number of institutions overseas including the Graduate Institute of International and Development Studies in Geneva and Harvard Kennedy School at Harvard University.

Albert's career in the Department of Foreign Affairs began as an Assistant in the Office of the Secretary of Foreign Affairs in 1967. In 1969 Albert began serving in various capacities in Filipino diplomatic missions abroad: at the delegation to the United Nations in Geneva, Switzerland (1969–1975), at the Philippine Embassy in Bucharest in Romania which also managed Filipino relations with Hungary and East Germany (1975–1980), and at the Philippine Embassy in Bonn in West Germany (1982–1990). From 1990 to 1995, Albert worked in the Philippines at the Department of Foreign Affairs where she was the director general of the ASEAN. In 1995 she was posted to the Philippine Embassy in Canberra as Ambassador to Australia (with concurrent accreditation to Nauru, Vanuatu and Tuvalu), a post she held until 2002. She also served as Dean of the Diplomatic Corps in 2001. Before her appointment on 22 December 2003 as Secretary of Foreign Affairs, she served as Undersecretary for International Economic Relations and Philippine Senior Official for the Asia-Pacific Economic Cooperation (APEC). Albert was Ambassador to Germany from 2005 to 2010.

Albert was appointed Knight Commander Cross of the Order of Merit with Star of the Federal Republic of Germany in 1992 for her efforts in promoting Philippine relations with Germany as well as relations between ASEAN and the European Union. She served as Director-General of the ASEAN National Secretariat of the Philippines. In January 2004, President Gloria Macapagal Arroyo conferred on her the Order of Sikatuna, with the rank of Datu, for her exceptional and meritorious services to the Republic of the Philippines.

== Personal life ==
Albert is married to journalist Hans Albert, a German national, to which they have one daughter together. The couple splits their time between the Philippines and Germany, where they also maintain a home in Wiesbaden. In addition to English and Filipino, as well as her native Ilocano, Albert also speaks German, French, Romanian, Spanish and Japanese.

Political offices
Preceded by Blas Ople	Secretary of Foreign Affairs; 2003–2004	Succeeded by Alberto Romulo
Diplomatic posts
Preceded by Rora Navarro-Tolentino	Ambassador of the Philippines to Australia; 1994–2002	Succeeded by Willy C. Gaa
