= Embassy of the Philippines, Canberra =

Diplomatic mission of the Philippines in Australia

Embassy of the Philippines, Canberra Pasuguan ng Pilipinas sa Canberra

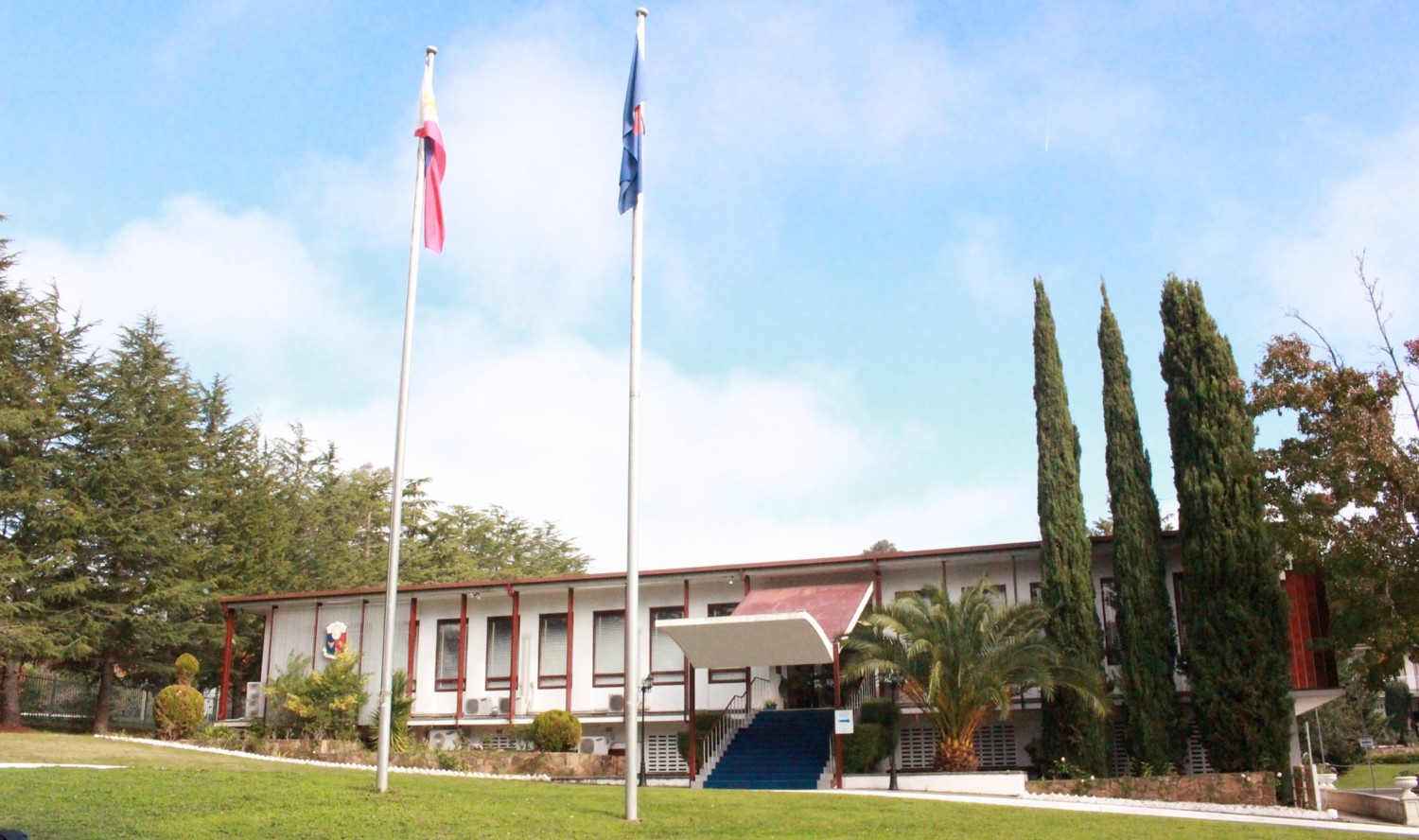
- Location: Canberra
- Address: 1 Moonah Place, Yarralumla
- Coordinates: 35°18′33.8″S 149°07′01.1″E
- Ambassador: Antonio A. Morales
- Website: https://www.philembassy.org.au/

The Embassy of the Philippines in Canberra is the diplomatic mission of the Republic of the Philippines to the Commonwealth of Australia. It is currently located at 1 Moonah Place in the Yarralumla suburb of south Canberra, just beyond the periphery of Parliament House.

== History ==
Although diplomatic relations between the Philippines and Australia were established in May 1946, the Philippines did not establish a presence in the country until three years later, when Roberto Regala, at the time serving as Consul General at the Philippine Consulate General in San Francisco, was appointed by President Elpidio Quirino as consul to Australia on July 8, 1949. Regala's appointment was subsequently accepted by the Australian government a month later, and he was elevated to the rank of minister the following year.

Despite there being a consul — and later minister — to Australia, the Philippines did not have a mission in Canberra; at the time, the country's interests were represented through the Philippine Consulate General in Sydney. For a time, the consulate was upgraded to an embassy in 1956 with the naming of Jose Imperial as the first resident Philippine ambassador to Australia. The Embassy was then moved to Canberra in 1962, with Imperial's successor, Mariano Ezpeleta, becoming the first Philippine ambassador to reside in the city.

The Embassy has seen itself become the subject of scandal in 2018, when the ABC News investigative program Four Corners found that a former ambassador to Australia had exploited a Filipino worker, and in 2020, when it had been accused on social media of calling in for questioning a certain person who had criticized President Rodrigo Duterte — a charge which it subsequently denied.

== Building ==
The buildings of the Philippine Embassy in Canberra were designed by noted Filipino architect Federico Ilustre, who had also designed the chancery of the Philippine Embassy in New Delhi, alongside the Australian firm Moir and Slater. Construction began in 1962, and it was opened on Philippine Independence Day, June 12, 1964, with both the chancery and the ambassadorial residence being located within the same compound.

== Staff and activities ==
The Philippine Embassy in Canberra is headed by Ambassador Antonio A. Morales, who was appointed to the position by President Bongbong Marcos on June 25, 2024. Prior to becoming Ambassador, Morales, a career diplomat with over thirty years of experience, served as Undersecretary for Administration at the Department of Foreign Affairs, and prior to that headed the Philippine Consulate General in Hong Kong. His appointment was confirmed by the Commission on Appointments on August 7, 2024, and he presented his credentials to Governor General Sam Mostyn on December 4, 2024.

Notable diplomats who have been deployed to the Embassy as Ambassadors to Australia include Leticia Ramos Shahani, who would later become Senator, and future Foreign Affairs Secretary Delia Albert.

Many of the Embassy's activities center around fostering continuing relations between the Philippines and Australia, and in particular with respect to the more than 300,000 Filipino Australians. These include organizing a lecture on the discovery of Homo luzonensis, hosting the Loboc Children's Choir during its tour of Australia, and facilitating cultural exchanges between the two countries. It also works closely with Filipino communities and community organizations throughout Australia, particularly during natural disasters, and also works with government agencies in the Philippines to ensure the welfare of Filipinos coming to Australia.

== See also ==
- Australia–Philippines relations
- List of diplomatic missions of the Philippines
- Filipino Australians
