= Leticia Ramos-Shahani =

Filipina politician and diplomat

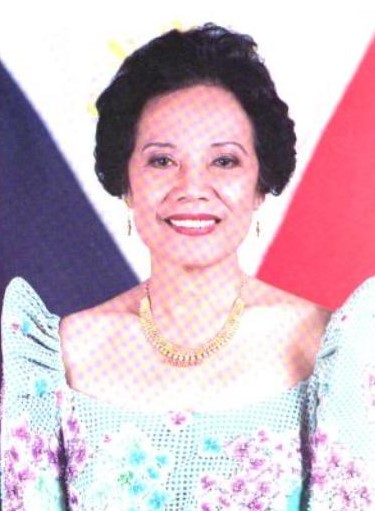
- Official portrait, 1997

Senator of the Philippines
- In office June 30, 1987 – June 30, 1998

President pro tempore of the Senate of the Philippines
- In office July 6, 1993 – October 10, 1996
- President: Edgardo Angara; Neptali Gonzales
- Preceded by: Teofisto Guingona, Jr.
- Succeeded by: Blas Ople

Undersecretary/Deputy Minister of Foreign Affairs
- In office 1986–1987
- President: Corazon Aquino

UN Assistant Secretary-General for Social and Humanitarian Affairs
- In office 1981–1986

Ambassador of the Philippines to Australia
- In office August 1978 – December 1980
- President: Ferdinand Marcos
- Preceded by: Monico Vicente
- Succeeded by: Gregorio Abad

Personal details
- Born: Leticia Valdez Ramos; September 30, 1929 Lingayen, Pangasinan, Philippine Islands
- Died: March 20, 2017 (aged 87) Taguig, Philippines
- Cause of death: Pneumonia, cardiac arrest
- Resting place: Manila Memorial Park – Sucat
- Party: Lakas (1991–2017)
- Other political affiliations: LDP (1988–1991); UNIDO (until 1988)
- Spouse: Ranjee Shahani (m. 1962; died 1970)
- Children: 3
- Relatives: Fidel Ramos (brother); Marcos family
- Education: Wellesley College (BA); Columbia University (MA); University of Paris (Ph.D)
- Occupation: Politician
- Profession: Professor

Leticia Valdez Ramos-Shahani (September 30, 1929 – March 20, 2017) was a Filipino senator, diplomat, and writer.

She was the younger sister of Fidel V. Ramos, the 12th president of the Philippines.

== Early life ==
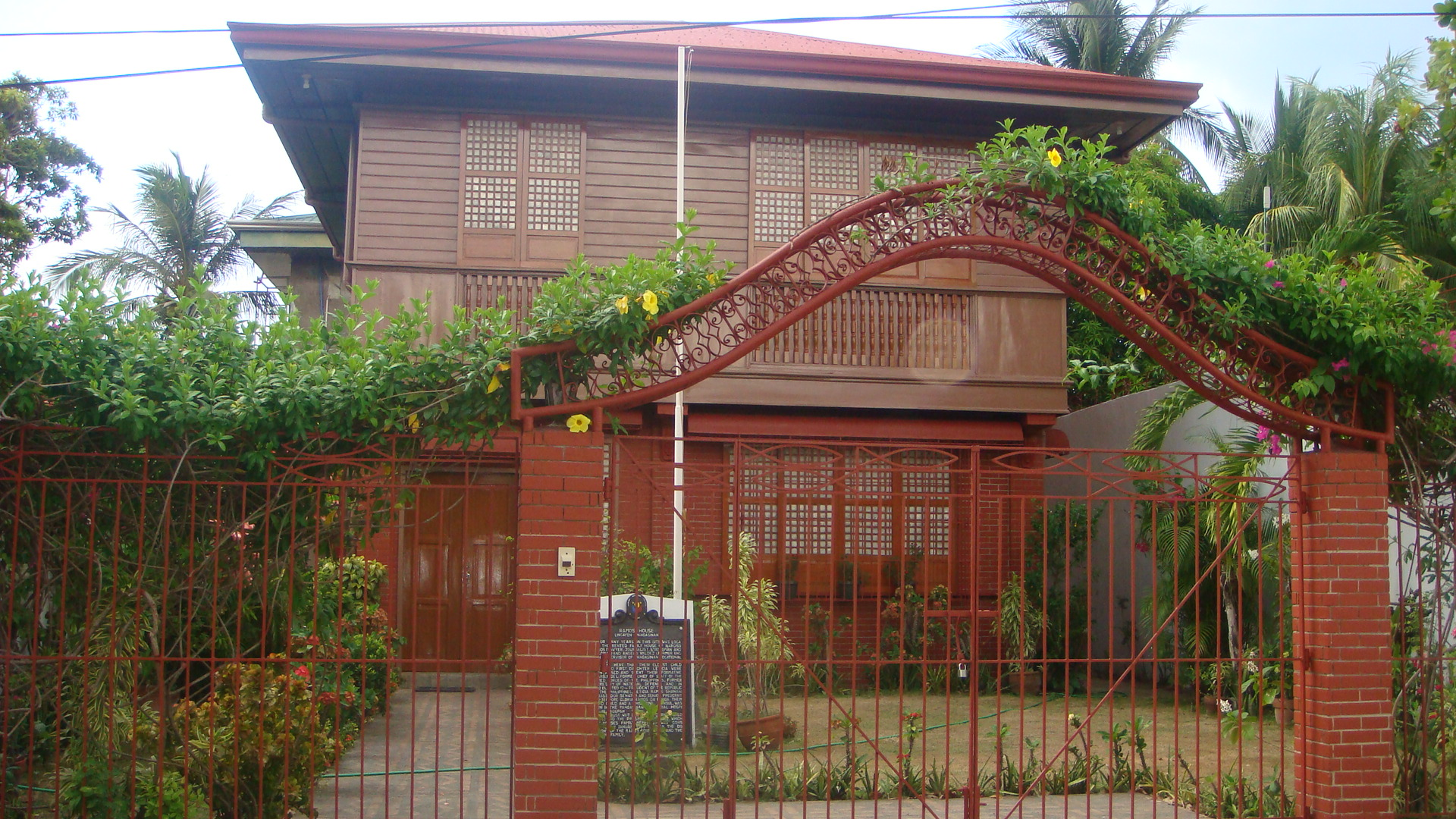
The Ramos House along Primicias Street in Lingayen. This was the rented family house of Narciso and Ángela Ramos, where Fidel and Leticia were born.

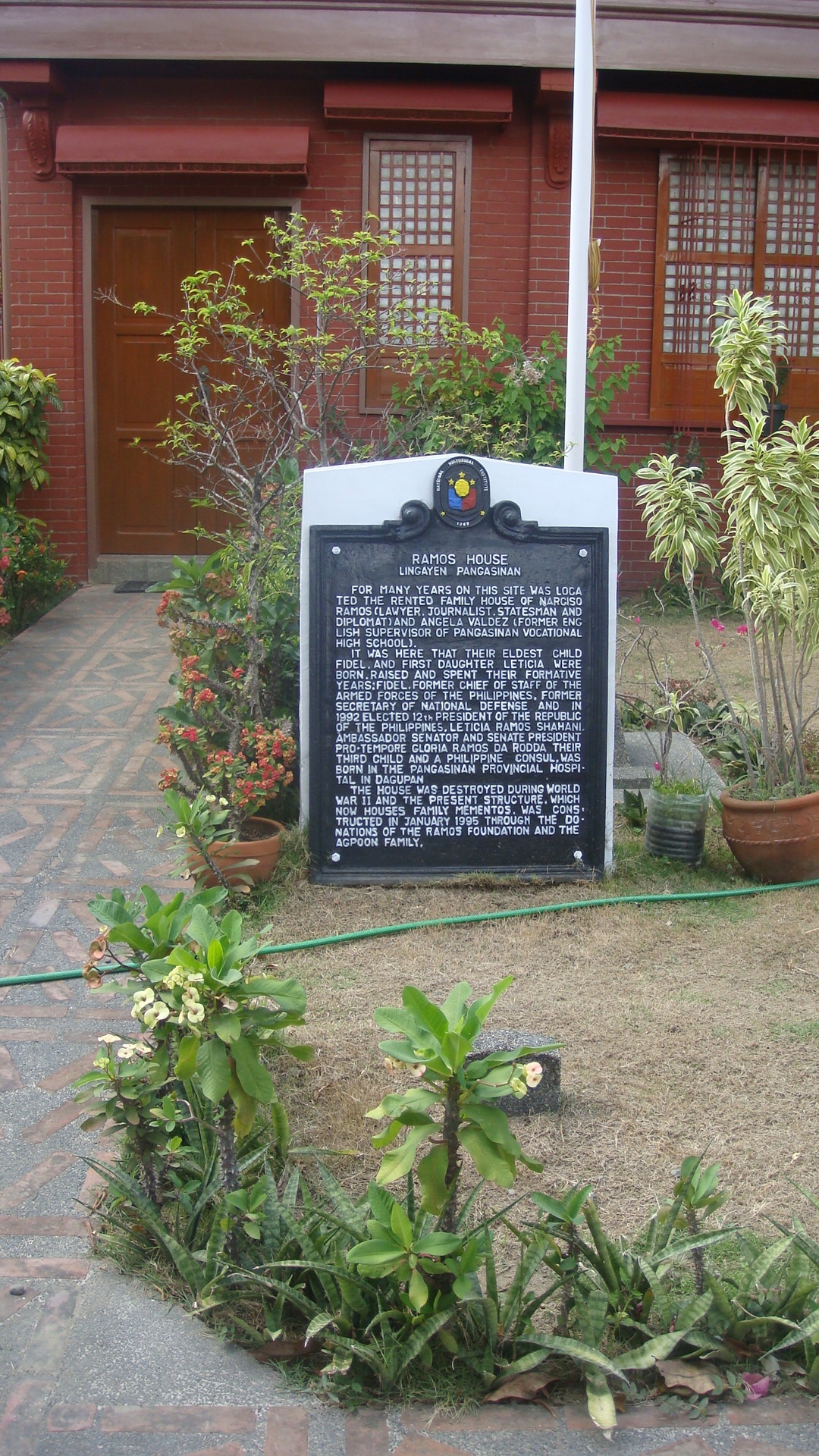
Ramos House historical marker

She was born on September 30, 1929, in Lingayen, Pangasinan and grew up in Asingan town along with her brother, former President Fidel V. Ramos. Her father, Narciso Ramos (1900–1986), was a lawyer, crusading journalist and five-term legislator at the House of Representatives, who eventually became Secretary of Foreign Affairs. As such, Narciso Ramos was the Philippine signatory to the ASEAN declaration forged in Bangkok in 1967 and was one of the founder of the Liberal Party. He was of the Ramos clan that has roots in Asingan, Pangasinan.

Her mother, Angela Valdez-Ramos (1905–1978), was an educator, suffragette and daughter of the prominent Valdez clan of Batac, Ilocos Norte, making her a second degree cousin of Ferdinand Marcos, the 10th President of the Philippines.

== Education ==
Ramos-Shahani finished her elementary and secondary level education at the University of the Philippines. She finished her Bachelor of Arts in English literature at Wellesley College in Massachusetts and her master's degree in comparative literature at Columbia University in New York. She earned her Doctor of Philosophy in comparative literature at the University of Paris (Sorbonne) after defending her doctoral thesis with highest honors.

She was a former dean of the Graduate School of Lyceum of the Philippines. She taught English literature, French, Spanish, comparative literature, humanities, social psychology and others. She was former member of the faculty of the University of the Philippines from 1954 to 1957, Queens Borough Community College, New York in 1961, Brooklyn College, New York in 1962 and New School for Social Research, New York from 1962 to 1967.

She was also the former dean of the College of International, Humanitarian, and Development Studies of Miriam College.

== Political career ==
=== Early diplomatic career ===
After passing the Philippine Foreign Service Officer (FSO) Examination, Ramos-Shahani held various high positions such as Ambassador to Australia from August 1978 to December 1980; UN Assistant Secretary-General for Social and Humanitarian Affairs from 1981 to 1986; and Secretary-General of the World Conference on the UN Decade of Women in Nairobi, Kenya in 1985. As Ambassador, she travelled extensively around Australia and was the first Philippine envoy to Australia to visit the Northern Territory. Under her watch, the Australian-Philippines Friendship Society was formally organized in December 1980. She also saw the first formal consultations between Philippines and Australia in Canberra in 1979 and again in 1980. She advocated for the establishment of a chair in Philippine studies in a top university in Australia.

=== People Power Revolution ===
Ramos-Shahani eventually spoke up against the Marcos dictatorship, speaking in support of opposition candidate Corazon Aquino. She then resigned from her UN post and returned to the Philippines, whereupon she tried to convince her brother, Philippine Constabulary Director General Fidel V. Ramos, to support the opposition.

After the 1986 EDSA Revolution, Ramos-Shahani became the new revolutionary government's Deputy Minister for Philippine Affairs, serving until a new constitution and a new democratic government could be established, in 1987.

=== Senatorial career ===
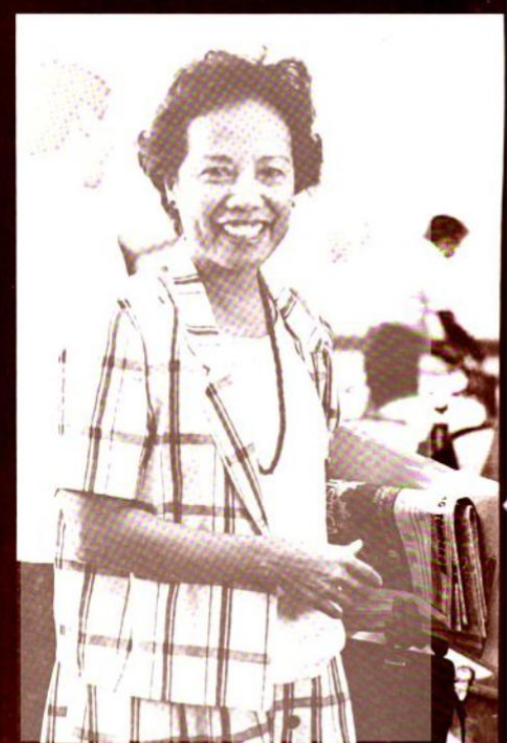
Ramos-Shahani as senator, c. 1988

In 1987, Ramos-Shahani was elected as Senator in 1987. Reelected in 1992, she rose to the post of Senate President pro tempore in 1993, during the presidency of her brother Fidel.

During her term in Senate, Ramos-Shahani was the chair of various committees like the Committee on Foreign Affairs, Committee on Education, Culture and Arts, Committee on Agriculture and member of the Commission on Appointments.

=== Post-Senate career ===
After her second Senate term ended in 1998, Ramos-Shahani would later hold several positions in government. Between 2001 and 2004, she served as Director of the Manila Economic and Cultural Office (MECO), Presidential Adviser on Culture and head of the National Committee of Libraries and Information Services of the National Commission on Culture and the Arts, and chairperson of the committee on culture of the UNESCO National Commission of the Philippines. From 2008 to 2011, she was the Dean of the College of International, Humanitarian and Development Studies of Miriam College.

== Family ==
Ramos-Shahani was married to the late Indian professor and writer Dr. Ranjee Gurdassing Shahani (1913–1970), whose father had roots in Sindh (currently in Pakistan) of undivided India, and was forced to migrate to India after the 1947 Partition of India. Together they had three children, two sons and a daughter, eldest son Ranjit, another son Chanda Narciso and the youngest, a daughter, Lila Ranjit Ramos Shahani is the former and youngest Pangasinan Vice Governor (1990–1995), Pangasinan 6th District representative (1995–2001), board member (2010–2016) and member of the Board of the Manila Economic and Cultural Office (de facto Philippine embassy to Taiwan) from 2017 onwards. Chanda Narciso Ramos Shahani is the real estate and organic food businessman. Lila Ramos Shahani is the former Assistant Secretary at the National Anti-Poverty Commission (2010–2012), former Head of Communications of the Human Development and Poverty Reduction Cabinet Cluster (2010–2016) and current Secretary General of the Philippine National Commission to UNESCO appointed in 2016.

=== Death ===
Ramos-Shahani was rushed to the intensive care unit of St. Luke's Medical Center – Global City in Bonifacio Global City, Taguig for pneumonia after suffering from Stage 4 colorectal cancer. She died there on March 20, 2017, at 02:40 PHT (UTC+8), at the age of 87. In 2018, the New York Times wrote a belated obituary for her.

On March 27, 2017, her remains were cremated and were interred at their family mausoleum at Manila Memorial Park – Sucat in Parañaque.

== Electoral history ==
Electoral history of Leticia Ramos-Shahani
Year	Office	Party	Votes received				Result
Year	Office	Party	Total	%	P.	Swing	Result
1987	Senator of the Philippines	UNIDO	11,089,340	48.77%	7th	—N/a	Won
1992	Senator of the Philippines	Lakas–NUCD	6,578,582	27.12%	9th	—N/a	Won
