= Hanging With =

Australian children's television series

- Hanging With title card used from 2018 onwards
- Also known as: Hanging with Adam & Naomi (2013–15); Hanging with Adam & Ash (2015–16)
- Genre: Children's
- Created by: Amy McCulloch
- Directed by: Amy McCulloch (2013–15); Vanessa Collier (2015–16)
- Presented by: Ashleigh Wells; Tim Matthews; Siena Elchaar; Joel Maguire; Ella Victoria
- Opening theme: "Take Me Away" by Clooney (2013–17) "Feelin' Like" by Ms. Triniti (2018–present)
- Country of origin: Australia
- Original language: English
- No. of series: 7

Production
- Executive producers: Amy McCulloch; Vanessa Collier
- Production locations: Chief Entertainment, Sydney, New South Wales
- Running time: 2–3 minutes (Note: The run time was extended to 30 minutes for the 2017 season. Hanging With: Weekend Hangout (2018–19) episodes also ran for 30 minutes.)

Original release
- Network: Disney Channel
- Release: 15 July 2013 – 20 September 2019

Hanging With is an Australian children's television series which aired on Disney Channel from 2013 to 2019.

It premiered on 15 July 2013 as a short-form series dispersed between programs. The variety entertainment series would air at 4:30pm (AEST) weekdays with hosts who act as the faces of Disney Channel. The hosts presented Disney programming news, along with celebrity interviews, sketches, and other segments including crafts, games, quizzes and challenges. The hosts also produced factual field stories filmed outside of the studio. Its final hosts were Ashleigh Wells and Tim Matthews, along with supporting presenters Siena Elchaar, Joel Maguire and Ella Victoria.

The program typically aired for 36 weeks of the year, with regular breaks throughout. The final episode aired on 20 September 2019, ahead of the closure of the network in 2020.

== History ==
The show was originally formatted as a short-form series titled Hanging with Adam & Naomi, and was hosted by Adam Roberts with Naomi Sequeira, who had together previously presented the ASTRA-nominated program Backstage Pass and other Disney Channel interstitials. Sequeira departed the program in 2015 and was replaced by Ashleigh Wells, who had previously worked on the channel. The series was renamed to Hanging with Adam & Ash accordingly.

Beginning 13 February 2017, the short-form series was expanded to a new runtime of 30 minutes, and retitled Hanging With. Roberts and Wells continued as the primary hosts, being joined by various other Disney Channel personalities. Additional presenters included Ella Victoria (The Style Edit), Grace Pitts and Joel Maguire (Radio Disney Insider), Emma Graham and Jackson Ryan (Gamefest), Siena Elchaar, Chantel Cofie and Milly Alcock (B.F. Chefs), and Georgia-May Davis (Backstage Pass). In November 2017, Hanging With returned to its original short-form format but retained the additional presenters.

An additional 30-minute weekly episode, titled Hanging With: Weekend Hangout, aired from January 2018 to April 2019. This special episode aired on Saturdays and presented the highlights of the week's segments.

Ahead of the closure of Disney Channel in early 2020, Hanging With aired its final episode on 20 September 2019.

== Hosts ==
=== Main hosts ===
Original Final

Role	Name	First Show	Last Show
Host	Naomi Sequeira	15 July 2013	20 February 2015
Host	Ashleigh Wells	23 February 2015	20 September 2019
Host	Adam Roberts	15 July 2013	15 December 2017
Host	Tim Matthews	December 2017	20 September 2019

Notes

- Naomi Sequeira returned as a guest several times between 2015 and 2017 to promote her program The Evermoor Chronicles and from the set of her movie Rip Tide.
- Ashleigh Wells joined the show as an entertainment reporter on 25 August 2014.

=== Supporting hosts ===
- Georgia-May Davis (2017–18)
- Siena Elchaar (2017–19)
- Joel Maguire (2017–19)
- Jackson Ryan (2017–18)
- Ella Victoria (2017–19)

== Time slots ==
- From 2013 to 2017, Hanging With aired at 4:30pm (AEST) weekdays. The program returned to this slot in April 2019.
- The program aired at 4:00pm (AEST) weekdays from November 2017 to July 2018.
- The program aired at 5:00pm (AEST) weekdays from July 2018 to April 2019.

== Awards and nominations ==
Year	Award	Category	Nominee(s)	Result	Ref.
2014	ASTRA Awards	Favourite Personality - Female	Naomi Sequeira	Nominated	
2015	ASTRA Awards	Most Outstanding Presenter - Female	Naomi Sequeira	Nominated	
2018	AACTA Awards	Subscription Television Award for Best Female Presenter	Ashleigh Wells	Nominated	

== See also ==
- List of longest-running Australian television series
