= Alfred Stewart =

Alfred Stewart may refer to:

- Alf Stewart, fictional character in Home and Away
- Alfred Walter Stewart (1880–1947), British chemist and part-time novelist
- Alf Stewart (boxer) from Len Johnson (boxer)
- Alfie Stewart from List of Sadie J characters
