= List of Sadie J characters =

The following is a list of characters from the CBBC children's series Sadie J, which began airing on 14 January 2011.

== Sadie Jenkins ==
Sadie Jenkins
- Sadie J character
- Portrayed by: Georgia Lock
- Duration: 2011-
- First appearance: 14 January 2011
In-universe information
- Father: Steve Jenkins Brother= Danny

Sadie Jenkins (played by Georgia Lock) is seen to be always speaking to the camera. She is portrayed as a girl who often takes advantage of her friends namely Dede Baxter and Kit Karter, for talents and takes credit for them. She realises about her wrongdoings and her friends stick by her. Sadie has a sibling played by Danny Jenkins, and her parent played by Steve Jenkins, with her dog played by Roger and a mechanical apprentice (Keith) with whom she shares a household. All of these are male people, hence, her habits are those of a boy and there is no girl role model for her to look up to apart from Cheryl Cole who she calls 'Chezza'. This is the reason why some of her fashion tastes are so boyish, she has such bad manners and is better than her brother and his best friend at football. Sadie is often called the 'Sasster' and 'Sassie J'. She has a boyfriend, Taylor at the beginning of the third series who her father doesn't accept at first, but does so eventually.

== Dede Baxter ==
Dede Baxter
- Sadie J character
- Portrayed by: Priyanka Patel
- Duration: 2011-
- First appearance: 14 January 2011

Deliah 'Dede' Baxter (played by Priyanka Patel) one of the three primary main characters is portrayed as a girl who is extremely clever and determined to achieve 100% in everything. She does not have much in common with Sadie, but she is often taken advantage of and has her talents exploited. This happens to Dede more often than it does to Kit. For example, she has 'the voice of Mariah Carey' in one episode, when Sadie is determined to prove herself as a fantastic singer, she uses Dede's voice and mimes so that she is no longer a social outcast. In a bid to prove herself to Kit as a fashion icon, Sadie attempts to make a dress that everyone thinks is horrible. Dede agrees to help her and uses her history knowledge to create the 'perfect costume' for 'The Y Fundraiser'. Everyone agrees it is a wonderful dress and Sadie takes credit for it. Dede is also known as the 'Deedster'.

== Kit Karter ==
Kit Karter
- Sadie J character
- Portrayed by: Ronan Carter
- Duration: 2011-2013
- First appearance: 14 January 2011
- Last appearance: 6 February 2013

Christopher "Kit" Karter (played by Ronan Carter) is also one of three primary main characters and is a flamboyant teenager. He always participates in productions and knows the latest fashions off by heart. He is a celebrity follower and knows the latest music too. It is also revealed that he has a secret talent for cooking and he makes top quality 'Pixie Lott Pies'. He has common interests with Sadie in that both of them want to be at the top of the social hierarchy. He also calls himself 'Kitty Kat', with other characters calling him it as well. In the third series, he leaves to live with his dad in Brazil.

== Danny Jenkins ==
Danny Jenkins
- Sadie J character
- Portrayed by: Will Nye
- Duration: 2011-
- First appearance: 14 January 2011

Danny Jenkins (played by Will Nye) is Sadie's little brother who is always up to mischief with his best friend Jake. He is nearly always seen with the family dog.

== Jake ==
Jake
- Sadie J character
- Portrayed by: Bobby Fuller
- Duration: 2011-
- First appearance: 14 January 2011

Jake (played by Bobby Fuller) is Danny's partner in crime. He also has a crush on Sadie.

== Chloe ==
Chloe
- Sadie J character
- Portrayed by: Rose Linton
- Duration: 2011
- First appearance: 14 January 2011
- Last appearance: 25 March 2011

Chloe (played by Rose Liston) is the waitress at the Y in series 1 and Sadie's rival. She leaves in series 2 and is replaced by Ashlii.

== Ms. V ==
Ms. V
- Sadie J character
- Portrayed by: Mel Giedroyc
- Duration: 2011-
- First appearance: 14 January 2011

Ms. V is the owner of the 'Y' Diner and is branded by Sadie as 'scary diner owner'. She is Russian and portrayed as a strict woman, determined to make her diner the best business.

== Steve Jenkins ==
Steve Jenkins
- Sadie J character
- Portrayed by: Steve Speirs
- Duration: 2011-
- First appearance: 14 January 2011

Steve Jenkins is the widowed father of Sadie and Danny and runs a mechanic business from his garage. He stands up for Sadie and his character is a kind, but gruff person who can be considered 'uncool' and loves his family. In the third series, he begins dating Beverley who runs a salon, but takes a while to tell Sadie.

== Keith Woods ==
Keith Woods
- Sadie J character
- Portrayed by: Alfie Stewart
- Duration: 2011-
- First appearance: 14 January 2011

Keith Woods is Steve's apprentice. He is portrayed as stupid and often helps Steve with many other things besides his mechanics business. He lives with Steve and his family and is like Steve's brother or son.

== Ashlii Summers ==
Ashlii Summers
- Sadie J character
- Portrayed by: Nina Jaspaul
- Duration: 2012-
- First appearance: 25 January 2012

Ashlii Summers is Sadie's nemesis. She boasts about her looks. In Blackmailamundo, in return for not telling Steve that Sadie broke her curfew, she treats Sadie like a slave. She only appears in series 2, taking over the waitress job from Chloe. She is the daughter of Steve's new girlfriend Beverley

== Others ==
Character	Episode(s)	Actor	Circumstances
Imogen	Series 1, Episode 7, Series 2, Episode 2, Series 2, Episode 3, Series 3, Episode 4, Series 2, Episode 6, Series 2, Episode 7 and Series 2 Episode 11.	Daniella Eames	Danny and Jake's 'frenemy', and used to be Jake's girlfriend. She beats them at video games and tries to prove that she's better than the boys.
Whitney Landon	Series 1, Episode 2, Series 1, Episode 8, Series 1, Episode 11 and Series 2, Episode 4	Georgina Campbell	One of the cheerleaders and is a rival of Sadie's. She always attempts to put others down, like in the episode "Cocolocolistic", in which she tricks Kit into being her manager.
Taylor Bell	Series 2, Episode 1, Series 2, Episode 11, Series 2, Episode 12 and Series 2, Episode 13		Sadie's crush in series 2. Sadie tries to impress him, however he is already dating Ashlii. He later becomes Sadie's boyfriend in "Bardalicious".
