= List of Sadie J episodes =

The following list is of the episodes in the first series of the British children's television series Sadie J, which stars Georgia Lock, Ronan Carter and Priyanka Patel. It first aired on 14 January 2011.

== Series overview ==
Series	Episodes	Originally released	
Series	Episodes	First released	Last released
1	13	14 January 2011	25 March 2011
2	13	25 January 2012	29 March 2012
3	10	23 January 2013	27 March 2013

== Series 1 (2011) ==
No. overall	No. in series	Title	Directed by	Written by	Original release date	Prod. code
1	1	"Crushamondo"	Jonathan Gershfield	Robert Evans	14 January 2011	1.1
2	2	"Robobootylicious"	Jonathan Gershfield	Robert Evans, Emma Reeves	21 January 2011	1.2
Sadie fixes it for Dede's mum to come to the JLS concert with her, and gets Steve to help Dede with her robot wars fight night on the same night. Then Dede's mum turns out to be even less cool than Steve, so she tries to get her dad back, by sabotaging Dede's robot so he won't have to help her any more. First appearance: Whitney Guest Star: Maddy (Dede's mum) Absent: Chloe
3	3	"Friendalicious"	Jonathan Gershfield	Robert Evans	28 January 2011	1.3
Sadie thinks that Kit has traded her in as his BFF for Chloe. So, she invents a cooler, richer, better best friend - and then has to have him meet Kit.
4	4	"Slumberlicious"	Jonathan Gershfield	Robert Evans, Holly Lyons	4 February 2011	1.4
When Sadie accidentally arranges a slumber party, she ends up with Chloe coming to her sleepover. First appearance: Gary Gilmott
5	5	"Tidylicious"	Jonathan Gershfield	Robert Evans	11 February 2011	1.5
Sadie is sick to death with the low standards of hygiene in her home - and the apparent lack of interest from all the males she lives with, so she hires a housekeeper who turns out to be bananas. Guest Stars: Tamara, various housekeepers
6	6	"Fashiontastic"	Jonathan Gershfield	Robert Evans	18 February 2011	1.6
Sadie discovers she has no fashion sense when Kit lets her design a costume. Guest Star: Sonali Shah
7	7	"Partylicious"	Jonathan Gershfield	Robert Evans	25 February 2011	1.7
Sadie thinks she is too old to have a birthday party organised by her dad. Meanwhile, jake has a new girlfriend who makes the treehouse Girly instead of Boyish being so jealous Danny finds himself a girlfriend to, but it turns out both girls beat the boys at everything! First appearance: Imogen Guest Stars: Isabel
8	8	"Pompomtastic"	Jonathan Gershfield	Robert Evans	4 March 2011	1.8
Sadie thinks she has made it when Whitney invites her to a cheerleaders party - so she dumps Kit and Dede for the airheads, only to find out it is a cruel trick. Recurring character appearance: Whitney Absent: Chloe
9	9	"Cherylistic"	Jonathan Gershfield	Robert Evans	11 March 2011	1.9
Sadie accidentally promises to get an A-list celeb for a Save-the-Y-Club concert - so she ends trying, then lying, then finally impersonating Cheryl Cole herself. Guest Star: Security Guard
10	10	"Tiptastic"	Jonathan Gershfield	Robert Evans	18 March 2011	1.10
Sadie needs more money, so she becomes a roller-skating waitress in the Y - only to see Chloe walk off with her hard-earned cash. Final Appearance: Chloe
11	11	"Promalicious"	Jonathan Gershfield	Robert Evans	18 March 2011 (aired after Tiptastic)	1.11
Sadie wants to go to a prom but Whitney doesn't allow her to go without having a king so she pretends to sing but it is Dede who is singing. Recurring character: Whitney First appearance: Theresa Babcock Guest Star: Brad Note: This episode was broadcast in HD
12	12	"Girltastic (Part 1 of 2)"	Jonathan Gershfield	Robert Evans	25 March 2011	1.12
A journalist from a major teen magazine comes to visit to see if Sadie is good enough to be Tweenager of the Year - one problem: Sadie, Kit and Dede are off on the geography field trip, so Steve has to convince the journalist of how good his daughter is - difficult at the best of times, but things get worse when the journalist thinks Steve bullied her at school. Guest Star: Tracy Gilmott Absent: Danny, Jake, Ms V Note: This episode features flashbacks of the first series and was broadcast in HD.
13	13	"Girltastic (Part 2 of 2)"	Jonathan Gershfield	Robert Evans	25 March 2011 (Aired after Part 1)	1.13
When Steve and Keith discover that Sadie's main competition for Girltastic Girl of the Year is Whitney, the captain of the Cheerups, they have their work cut out to convince the journo that Sadie is better - but things go wrong when Steve and Whitney have a fight in the Y. Guest Star: Tracy Gilmott Absent: Danny and Jake Note: This episode features flashbacks of the first series (the same as Part 1) and was broadcast in HD.

== Series 2 (2012) ==
A second series was filmed in Summer 2011. Series 2 premiered on Wednesday 25 January 2012 at 5.15pm. All of Series 2 was broadcast in HD on BBC HD.

No. overall	No. in series	Title	Original release date
14	1	"Kissalicious"	25 January 2012
Sadie has a crush on Taylor Bell, the new boy in town - but she quickly discovers that his girlfriend is the monstrous Ashlii. Debut: Taylor Bell, Ashlii Guest Star: Nan Bet Note: The theme song and opening credits have been revamped. The theme song has a different sound to it, and the opening features different characters and settings. Absent: Whitney and Imogen
15	2	"Tofutastic"	1 February 2012
When Sadie discovers that her new crush, Taylor, is a committed vegetarian, she starts a campaign to get a veggie menu at the Y - but will Ashlii expose her as a fully-fledged meat eater? Meanwhile, Danny is stunned when he gets a good school report. Is this the end for him and Jake? Guest Stars: Rebekkah, Mary-Ann Matterson Absent: Whitney
16	3	"Gagalicious"	8 February 2012
When Kit's cousin comes to stay, Sadie and Dede think he's trying to turn Kit into someone different - but could it be Kit who feels he's got something to hide? Meanwhile, Danny and Jake try their hands being a DJ - but how far can they get with only Steve's old vinyl collection to work with? Guest Stars: Mr Snodgrass, Iolo and Max (Imogen's boyfriend) Absent: Whitney, Ashlii and Taylor (though he is mentioned)
17	4	"Cocolocolistic"	15 February 2012
Sadie auditions to get into a new girl band, The CocoLoco's, but when she upsets Kit once too often, he goes all out to get Whitney the gig in Sadie's place. Can Sadie win back her friend? Meanwhile, Imogen tries to have the boys' treehouse demolished so she can get Jake to come and hang out with her. Guest Stars: The Cocolocos Absent: Ashlii and Taylor
18	5	"Blackmailamundo"	22 February 2012
Ashlii tries to blackmail Sadie, but Sadie has the last laugh when a certain boyband comes to call! Meanwhile, Keith kidnaps a dog for a good cause and Dede tries to teach the boys all about her favourite sci-fi show. Guest Stars: Tinkle, Samantha Absent: Taylor and Imogen
19	6	"Bieberbopalicious"	29 February 2012
Sadie meddles with Ms V's love life just so she can be in a Justin Bieber video. But when her plans start to unravel, Sadie has to work extra hard to earn everyone's forgiveness. Back at home, Gary Gilmott is minding the garage for the week, and Keith fears that life may be a little different under the new boss. Guest Stars: Rebekkuh, Judd, Boxy and Tameka Absent: Steve (even though he is mentioned), Taylor, Ashlii, Whitney and Dede (though Dede was seen Spelunking in a quick clip)
20	7	"Megatronic"	7 March 2012
Sadie uses bribery and corruption to beat Dede in the race to be deputy head girl, even though she really doesn't want the job. Meanwhile, Imogen is trying to teach Danny how to knit (which goes really well, until Danny realises how much of a girl he has become), Steve is trying NOT to teach Keith how to swim and Kit will do anything for a Katy Perry concert ticket.
21	8	"Bridesmaidamundo"	14 March 2012
When Sadie interferes in her aunt's wedding, she discovers an uncomfortable truth from the past. Meanwhile Danny and Jake have their own worries when they take on best man duties. And when Dede attends a book-signing by Captain Skylo, from her favourite sci-fi show, she discovers that you should NEVER meet your heroes. Guest appearance: Theresa Babcock
22	9	"Moviemashupamundo"	15 March 2012
Sadie accidentally agrees to host a 'frightnight' movie night for Ashlii and Kalisha; unfortunately she's also supposed to be sharing a film night with Danny and Jake. Can she keep all the balls in the air? Or will the frightnight turn her home into a house of horror?
23	10	"Jazperilliant"	21 March 2012
Danny loses Roger, while Steve and Keith lose their sense of proportion when they get sucked into the latest video game. Back at the Y club Dede offends Ms V's nephew when she uses him as a way to complete the '10 things to do before you're 14' list. Absent: Sadie J (even though she was mentioned), Miss V (even though she was mentioned, too), Taylor, Whitney and Imogen
24	11	"Bardalicious"	22 March 2012
When Kit stages a Shakespearian extravaganza, Sadie is desperate to play opposite Taylor - but will she be able to finally outsmart Ashlii? And when Imogen goes looking for a ballroom dancing partner, Danny and Jake compete to get the part. Meanwhile, Keith discovers that Steve's new apprentice is an expert.
25	12	"Pixiepopalistic (Part 1 of 2)"	28 March 2012
Dede has to pretend to be Sadie so that Pixie Lott will come and make a TV show in Sadie's living room. But can Dede overcome Ashlii's plotting and Keith's boisterous mates to win the event? And can she keep up the pretence that she isn't really Sadie?
26	13	"Pixiepopalistic (Part 2 of 2)"	29 March 2012
When Dede is exposed as a fraud, she has to do all she can to convince the TV company that Pixie Lott should still come to Sadie's house. But will she and her friends get the chance to party with Pixie? And who saves the day? Guest Star: Pixie Lott Note: This is the final episode of series 2.

== Series 3 (2013) ==
A third series was first announced by Georgia Lock via Twitter. Production began in Summer 2012. The third series began airing on 23 January 2013.

No. overall	No. in series	Title	Original release date	Prod. code
27	1	"Beaudelicious"	23 January 2013	3.1
Sadie has finally got a boyfriend - but how is she going to tell her Dad that she's going out with Taylor? What she doesn't know is that Dad has some very big news of his own.
28	2	"Mamalicious"	30 January 2013	3.2
When Steve tries to make Sadie spend Mother's Day with his new girlfriend, Sadie goes on a campaign to get rid of her immediately.
29	3	"Braziliant"	6 February 2013	3.3
Sadie is so obsessed with getting to a One Direction concert that she doesn't see that she might be about to lose Kit for good. Is it the end for the gang? Meanwhile, Keith can't get anything done when Nan Bet comes to stay. Last Appearance: Kit
30	4	"Ricolatino"	13 February 2013	3.4
Sadie is so depressed that Kit has left the country that she decides to audition for a new bling friend; but is there really anyone out there who can match up to her old BFF? Debut: Rico
31	5	"Littlemixamondo"	20 February 2013	3.5
Rico and Dede battle it out to prove who is really Sadie's best friend - whoever wins gets to meet their favourite girl band, Little Mix. Special Appearance: Little Mix
32	6	"Dederama"	27 February 2013	3.6
When Dede rebels against her good girl image, it's up to Sadie and Taylor to talk her down. Meanwhile Ms V's throwing a Wild West night in the Y And Danny and Jake fight because they both want to dance with the same girl. But is she really what she seems?
33	7	"Dinnerlicious"	6 March 2013	3.7
When Sadie thinks Taylor is about to dump her, she decides to go 'retro' and cook dinner for him, but when Sadie's Aunt and Uncle drop by, on their way to the local UFO support group, the evening gets weird. Also, when Dede's TV appearance goes chaotically wrong it looks like Sadie's plans are completely doomed
34	8	"Seasonalicious"	13 March 2013	3.8
Sadie is desperate to go to a summer music festival - but her plans are wrecked when Steve and Bev decide to hold Christmas in June! So Sadie has to team up with her staunchest enemy to scupper their foolish Festive plans. Meanwhile, Keith thinks Steve doesn't want him living in the house anymore.
35	9	"Bobsleighbonkerlicious"	20 March 2013	3.9
When Dede enters a bobsleigh race, it's left to Sadie to recruit Ashlii to be their third team member.
36	10	"Byebyebabylicious"	27 March 2013	3.10
At first Sadie thinks that Steve's business has failed and that they have to sell the garage and the house until Bev and Steve reveal that Bev is pregnant and that they are planning on all moving in a bigger house together, Sadie was not over the moon until Bev tells sadie that the baby is a girl and they decided to call her Adele meaning she was going to get a sister, meanwhile Ms. V is moving on from the diner meaning that the gang are going to lose their hangout. This is the series finale Special Guest Star: Paul Hollywood
