= Ronan Carter =

American actor

- Born: 6 June 1996 (age 29); UK
- Occupation: Actor
- Years active: 2010 - present
- Known for: Mam; Sadie J

Ronan Carter (born 6 June 1996) is an English actor best known for his role of Christopher "Kit" Karter in the BAFTA-nominated British children's television comedy-drama Sadie J. Other notable screen credits include the main character in the short Mam as Danny, a twelve-year-old child, who must fend for his brothers and sisters - whilst trying to protect a secret that threatens to break up the family forever.

== Filmography ==
Year	Title	Role	Notes
2010	Mam	Danny	Short
2011-2013	Sadie J	Christopher "Kit" Karter	Main character (29 episodes)
2014	Life on the Line	Caller	Short
2017	Doctor Who	Ryder	1 Episode
