= LifeHack =

2025 film directed by Ronan Corrigan

- Theatrical release poster
- Directed by: Ronan Corrigan
- Written by: Ronan Corrigan; Hope Elliott Kemp
- Produced by: Timur Bekmambetov; Joann Kushner; Sasha Kletsov
- Starring: Georgie Farmer; Yasmin Finney; Roman Hayeck-Green; James Scholz; Jessica Reynolds; Charlie Creed-Miles
- Cinematography: Ciaron Craig
- Edited by: Ronan Corrigan; Aleksandr Kletsov
- Music by: Two Blinks, I Love You
- Production companies: Bazelevs Company; Screenlife Liverpool
- Distributed by: Vue
- Release dates: 8 March 2025 (SXSW); 15 May 2026
- Running time: 97 minutes
- Country: United Kingdom
- Language: English

LifeHack (also known as Life Hack, and stylized as LifeHACK) is a 2025 British screenlife action thriller film directed by Ronan Corrigan. It premiered at South by Southwest (SXSW) in 2025 and was released in the UK in Vue cinemas on 15 May 2026 The film stars Georgie Farmer, Yasmin Finney, Roman Hayeck-Green, James Scholz with Jessica Reynolds, and Charlie Creed-Miles.

== Premise ==
Used to encountering scammers online, four young adults come up with a plan to try to steal cryptocurrencies from Don Heard, a tech billionaire.

== Cast ==
- Georgie Farmer as Kyle
- Yasmin Finney as Alex
- Roman Hayeck-Green as Sid
- James Scholz as Petey
- Jessica Reynolds as Lindsey Heard, Don's daughter
- Charlie Creed-Miles as Don Heard, a tech billionaire

== Production ==
Ronan Corrigan began developing the film during the isolation period of the COVID-19 pandemic and wanted to portray the time when he played a lot on the PC when he was younger.

== Reception ==
On the review aggregator website Rotten Tomatoes, 95% of 42 critics' reviews are positive. The website's consensus reads: "An inventive spin on the found footage genre, LifeHack's high-pressure scenario and its gestures toward income inequality make for a thoughtful thriller worth plugging into."

In his review for Variety, Siddhant Adlakha said that "the result is a genuinely funny and ultimately heart-pounding production, with an executions that feels like a heist itself." At IndieWire, Christian Zilko rated it with a "B" saying that "the internet is the closest thing these teenage cyberthieves have to a real life, and Corrigan’s dopamine onslaught of a film is an authentic portrait of the most alive they’ve ever been."

Deadline Hollywood writer Pete Hammond said that "for my money, this is hands down the best Screenlife movie yet, a dazzling marriage of online skill, clever storytelling, brilliant editing and acting within the confines of your computer screen that rivals the best of any heist film in recent years." Despite not liking found footage or fake docs, Pedro Martin posted a positive review on ScreenAnarchy because of the characters: "is a good movie, despite (or because of) its screenlife styly (...) but what appeals to me most about the movie are the characters."

== See also ==
- Lifehack
- List of thriller films of the 2020s
- List of action films of the 2020s
