= Mam (film) =

- Directed by: Hugo Speer
- Written by: Vivienne Harvey
- Produced by: Rob Speranza & Vivienne Harvey
- Starring: Josie Lawrence; Paul Barber; Ronan Carter
- Cinematography: Sam Care
- Edited by: Josh Levinsky
- Music by: Amelia Warner
- Production company: Vigo Films
- Distributed by: Shorts International
- Release date: 20 November 2010 (Encounters Film Festival)
- Running time: 15 minutes
- Country: United Kingdom
- Language: English

Mam is a 2010 British short film by writer Vivienne Harvey and director Hugo Speer. Produced by Vigo Films in association with South Yorkshire Filmmakers Network. It has a running time of 15 minutes.

== Plot summary ==
When Mam won’t get out of bed, 12-year-old Danny must fend for his brothers and sisters - whilst trying to protect a secret that threatens to break up the family forever.

== Cast ==
- Josie Lawrence as Reenie
- Paul Barber as The Chemist
- Ronan Carter as Danny
- Tisha Merry as Charlie
- Karren Winchester as The Neighbour
- Charlie Street as Jimmy
- Katie Gannon as Lauren
- Patrick Downes as Tommy
- Sylvie Caswell as Kyla
- Elly May Taylor as Debs
- Jodie McEnery as Gang Member
- James Varley as Gang Member
- Dwayne Scantlebury as Gang Member
- Danny Gregory as Gang Member
- Paul Tomblin as Gang Member

== Accolades ==
- Best Foreign Film - Williamsburg Independent Film Festival, Brooklyn, USA (2011)
- Best Yorkshire Short - Hull International Short Film Festival, UK (2011)
- Best Community Short - Rob Knox Film Festival, UK (2012)

== Festivals ==
Country	Date	Festival
UK	20 November 2010	Encounters Film Festival
UK	15 January 2011	London Short Film Festival
USA	22 January 2011	Slamdance Film Festival
USA	5 March 2011	Cinequest Film Festival
UK	17 March 2011	Bradford International Film Festival
UK	29 April 2011	East End Film Festival
Russia	July 2011	Moscow Film Festival
UK	July 2011	Rushes Soho Shorts Film Festival
UK	August 2011	Deep Fried Film Festival
USA	September 2011	JC PowerHouse Short Film Festival
UK	October 2011	Hull International Short Film Festival
Germany	November 2011	Berlin Interfilm Festival
Mexico	November 2011	Oaxaca Film Fest
UK	November 2011	Aesthetica Short Film Festival
USA	November 2011	Williamsburg Independent Film Festival
Ireland	December 2011	Kerry Film Festival
Germany	January 2012	British Shorts, Berlin
