= Alfie Stewart =

English actor

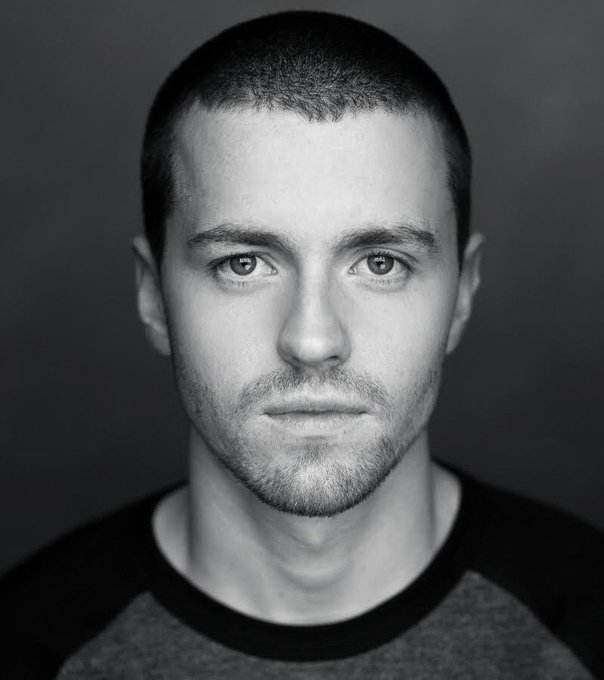
- Born: 24 December 1993 (age 32); Islington, London, England
- Occupation: Actor
- Years active: 2010–present

Alfie Stewart (born 24 December 1993) is an English actor. His notable films are Not Fade Away (2012), The Knife That Killed Me (2014), The Throwaways (2014), and The Outpost (2019). He is best known for his role as Keith Woods, the lead character in the series Sadie J.

== Filmography ==
=== Film ===
Year	Title	Role	Notes
2011	The Great Ghost Rescue	excited kid	
2011	Not Fade Away	Keith	
2011	Undefeated	Archie	Short
2014	Queen and Country	Henderson	
2014	The Knife That Killed Me	Stevie	
2014	Patient 39	patient 39	Short
2015	The Substitute	Hugo	Short
2015	The Throwaways	Teebs	
2015	Tear Me Apart	Younger Brother / Joe	
2016	David Brent: Life on the Road	office worker	
2016	Their Finest	soldier on the tube	
2017	Firecracker	Charlie	Short
2017	Fry-Up	Jake	Short
2018	The Good Soldier Schwejk	Schwejk	
2018	Razzmatazz	Jack	Short
2019	The Outpost	Pfc. Zorias Yunger	
2026	Lucky Strike	Miller	

=== Television ===
Year	Title	Role	Notes
2010	The Bill	Andy Blake	Episode: "Crossing the Line"
2010–2017	Casualty	Lee Tailor / Lyall Ramsey	2 episodes: "Guilty Secrets" (2010) "It Had to Be You" (2017)
2011–2013	Sadie J	Keith Woods	36 episodes
2012	Merlin	Daegal	Episode: "The Hollow Queen"
2013	Southcliffe	Danny	3 episodes
2013	Ripper Street	David Goodbody	Episode: "Threads of Silk and Gold"
2013–2014	The Village	Bert Middleton	2 episodes
2016	Stan Lee's Lucky Man	Billy	2 episodes
2016	Suspects	Nico Reynolds	Episode: "The Enemy Within: Part 3"
2017	Tracey Ullman's Show	Simon / Terry Marsh	2 episodes
