= Georgia Lock =

British actress and presenter (born 1996)

- Born: Georgia Nathalie Lock; 25 October 1996 (age 29); Aylesbury Vale, Buckinghamshire, England
- Occupations: Actress; Presenter; Singer-songwriter
- Years active: 2011–present

Georgia Nathalie Lock (born 25 October 1996) is an English actress and presenter. She starred in the children's series Sadie J and The Evermoor Chronicles, and presented the CBBC magazine show Friday Download.

== Early life and education ==
Lock was born in Aylesbury Vale and grew up in rural Buckinghamshire. She attended Waddesdon Church of England School. Her mother began taking her to drama classes in Winslow when she was eight.

== Career ==
In 2010, Lock was cast as the main character in the CBBC television show Sadie J, which ran for three series from 2011 to 2013. In addition to playing the lead, she recorded the theme song, "In a Boys' World". The theme tune was officially released by Demon Records, in association with the BBC. A shortened version of the song is used for the Sadie J title sequence.

In 2011, she began presenting the CBBC entertainment programme Friday Download alongside Tyger Drew-Honey, Cel Spellman, Richard Wisker, Dionne Bromfield and Aidan Davis. She presented for four series from 2011 to 2012.

In April 2014, it was announced that Lock had been cast as Bella in the Disney miniseries Evermoor alongside Naomi Sequeira, Jordan Loughran, George Sear and Georgie Farmer. In March 2015, it was announced that the miniseries had been given a full series order under the working title of The Evermoor Chronicles, with Lock set to reprise her role as Bella.

In April 2015, it was announced that Lock would co-present Michel Roux Jr's upcoming Disney reality children's cooking competition First Class Chefs alongside Evermoor co-star Finney Cassidy.

In October 2020, Lock published a poetry book, With Every Wave.

== Filmography ==
=== Film ===
| Year | Title | Role | Notes |
|---|---|---|---|
| 2015 | Social Suicide | Rozi | |
| 2021 | Me, Myself and Di | Araminta Craven | |
| 2022 | York Witches Society | Amber | |
| 2024 | Strictly Confidential | Mia | |

=== Television ===
| Year | Title | Role | Notes |
|---|---|---|---|
| 2011–2013 | Sadie J | Sadie Jenkins | Main role |
| 2011 | Blue Peter | Herself | Guest (episode airing February 2011); Guest presenter (episode airing December 2011) |
| 2011–2013 | Friday Download | Presenter | Series 1–4 |
| 2014–2017 | The Evermoor Chronicles | Bella Crossley | Main role |
| 2015 | First Class Chefs | Presenter | 1 series |
| 2017 | Doctors | Amy Baker | 2 episodes: "Blitz Spirit" and "Stuff Happens" |
| 2018 | The Killer Beside Me | Kelsey | Documentary series; "Target on Her Back" |
| 2019 | Sadie Sparks | Sadie | Voice; main role |
| 2024 | A Good Girl's Guide to Murder | Isla Jordan | 2 episodes: "Episode 5" and "Episode 6" |
| 2025 | Wolf King | Gretchen | Voice |

=== Web series ===
| Year | Title | Role | Notes |
|---|---|---|---|
| 2014 | 5-A-SIDE | Suzi Randall | Supporting role |
| 2015–2016 | Evermoor Confidential Chronicles | Bella Crossley | 3 episodes |

== Discography ==
=== Singles ===
| Title | Year | Peak chart positions | Album |
| Title | Year | UK | Album |
|---|---|---|---|
| "In a Boys' World" | 2011 | — | Non-album singles |
| "Skin" | 2020 | — | Non-album singles |
| "Run" | 2020 | — | Non-album singles |
| "Roots (Acoustic)" | 2020 | — | Non-album singles |
| "Roots" | 2020 | — | Non-album singles |
| "Taxi" | 2020 | — | Non-album singles |
| "Chelsea" | 2020 | — | Non-album singles |
| "Know You" | 2025 | — | Non-album singles |
| "Confessions (Good Things)" | 2026 | — | |

== Awards and nominations ==
| Organisation | Year | Category | Nominated work | Result | Ref. |
|---|---|---|---|---|---|
| British Academy Children's Awards | 2011 | Entertainment | Friday Download | Nominated | |
| British Academy Children's Awards | 2011 | Comedy | Sadie J | Nominated | |
| British Academy Children's Awards | 2012 | Entertainment | Friday Download | Won | |
| International Emmy Kids Awards | 2015 | TV movie/Mini-Series | The Evermoor Chronicles | Nominated | |
