= The Throwaways (film) =

- Release poster
- Directed by: Tony Bui
- Written by: Don Handfield; Michael Ross
- Produced by: Jeffery Beach; Phillip J. Roth
- Starring: Sam Huntington; Katie McGrath; Christian Hillborg; Jack Kesy; Kevin Dillon; James Caan
- Cinematography: José David Montero
- Edited by: Ryan Eaton
- Music by: Alex Kovacs; Jerome Leroy
- Production companies: The Combine; UFO International Productions
- Distributed by: Crackle
- Release date: January 30, 2015
- Running time: 90 minutes
- Country: United States
- Language: English

The Throwaways is a 2015 American action film directed by Tony Bui, written by Don Handfield and Michael Ross, and starring Sam Huntington, Katie McGrath, Christian Hillborg, Jack Kesy, Kevin Dillon, and James Caan. It premiered on January 30, 2015, on Crackle.

== Plot ==
When infamous hacker Drew Reynolds is captured by the CIA, he is given a choice: Spend his life in prison or work for them. He agrees to work for the CIA in the condition that he can form his own team, the "Throwaways". This team was seen as expendable and deemed the worst in the whole organization.

The film opens with lone wolf patriot and black hat hacker Drew Reynolds living in solitude and doing what he does best: hacking anyone he feels is a threat to America and the free world, including various jihadist and other terrorist organizations and militia groups. His friend in cybersecurity, Erik, alerts him that the CIA has tracked him down and though he manages to briefly elude them, he is captured. Upon meeting with him, Agents Holden (a former mentor of Drew) and Connelly offer him a deal: Spend 30 years to life in prison, or help them catch an even greater threat. An unidentified hacker has somehow managed to shut down Chicago's power grid using a volatile program known as "Pantheon", which utilizes a special encryption key that gives him the hacker access to the entire Internet and World Wide Web and beyond. If the device gets into the wrong hands, the entire world will be at the mercy of any number of terrorists, most likely the highest bidder. Drew agreed to help track down the hacker in exchange for total immunity, on one condition: He picks the team of experts he will be working with.

Over the reservations of Connelly and Holden, Drew picks three agents who had been deemed "Throwaways" based on their lack of success or other factors:

- Dan Fisher, a short tempered and violence-prone ex-agent who's been relegated to basement duty;
- Gloria Miller, a "swallow" agent who successfully seduces her marks but is nonetheless not taken seriously by her cohorts
- Dmitri Stanislav, a cowardly ex-KGB agent with a history of deserting his comrades (including Fisher at one point) on dangerous missions.

As the mission progresses, the team are able to learn that the hacker in question is Teebs, a young anarchist who intends to sell the key on the black market to the highest bidder, who ends up being a pro-Soviet Russian defector named Olag Konstantin. It is also revealed that Drew faked the algorithm process by which he chose his team; he simply read their files and selected them based on their shoddy records hoping that the mission would end in failure. With his immunity deal having already been signed, Drew could then go back to working alone. The others discover this following an assassination attempt on Holden, after which Connelly disbands the team but commends them for proving far more successful than he'd previously thought they would be. Furious, Fisher, Gloria, and Dmitri leave in a huff.

Shortly after, a failed raid to apprehend Teebs's and Konstantin's broker results in Connelly and his team being killed. Drew has Erik pull up everything he can on Teebs while at the same time, Holden identifies one of the assassins who murdered Connelly and his team as Bes, a chameleon agent posing as Teebs's girlfriend who is under Konstantin's employ. Shortly afterward, Teebs reactivates Pantheon at Konstantin's order, causing Bulgaria to experience total blackout. Thanks to Erik's help, Drew is able to locate Teebs and after an apology followed by a rousing pep talk, he and Holden are able to convince their former team members to return and finish the mission.

Once the team is back together, they sneak into Konstantin's headquarters. Drew finds Teebs and tries to convince him to hand over the key. Teebs attacks him instead, but drops the key when Drew shoots him, destroying it and forcing Drew to bypass the hardwired encryption in order to restore Bulgaria's power and prevent a lethal gas valve failure. Gloria, Fisher, and Dmitri take on Konstantin and his men in a lengthy and caper-filled confrontation. Gloria manages to kill Bes while Dmitri and Fisher are able to take out Konstantin and the soldiers with an RPG launcher.

Their mission a success, Drew is made an official CIA agent under Holden's command and is teamed up with the now fully reestablished agents before they eagerly head out on their next mission. Meanwhile, a post-credits scene shows Teebs retrieving another Pantheon key from a strongbox in an unknown location.

== Cast ==
- Sam Huntington as Drew Reynolds
- Kevin Dillon as Dan Fisher
- Katie McGrath as Gloria Miller
- Christian Hillborg as Dmitri Stanislav
- James Caan as Lt. Col. Christopher Holden
- Jack Kesy as Connelly
- Noel Clarke as Erik Williamson
- Alfie Stewart as Teebs
- Darrell D'Silva as Olag Konstantin
- Bashar Rahal as The Broker
- Amber Jean Rowan as Bes
- Peter Brooke as Agent Langstrom
- Atanas Srebrev as Princeton

== Production ==
Principal photography began in September 2014. The film was originally scheduled to premiere on December 19, 2014, but was pushed back due to the Sony Pictures Entertainment hack. The film premiered on January 30, 2015, on Crackle.
