= Sadie J =

British children's television series

- Series 1 titlecard
- Genre: Teen sitcom
- Created by: Robert Evans
- Starring: Georgia Lock; Priyanka Patel; Ronan Carter; Steve Speirs; Nina Jaspaul; Thulani Sityata; Bobby Fuller; William Nye; Alfie Stewart; Mel Giedroyc; Rose Liston
- Opening theme: "(The Only Girl) In A Boy's World" by Georgia Lock
- Country of origin: United Kingdom
- No. of series: 3
- No. of episodes: 36 (list of episodes)

Production
- Executive producer: Gina Cronk
- Producers: Paul McKenzie; Simon Nelson
- Running time: 30 minutes

Original release
- Network: CBBC
- Release: 14 January 2011 – 27 March 2013

Sadie J is a British children's television comedy-drama series about a girl named Sadie Jenkins, who is described as "the only girl in a boys' world" because she is surrounded by her Dad Steve, his apprentice Keith, her brother Danny, his best friend Jake and their dog Roger. It is produced by the BBC and airs on the CBBC Channel. The show premiered on 14 January 2011 and produced three series, with the final episode aired on 27 March 2013. As of September 2013, Sadie J is now shown in the United States on the Starz Kids & Family cable network.

== Background ==
Screenterrier first posted a casting call for Sadie J in March 2010. It was billed as "a feel-good comedy about a feisty 13-year-old girl with the sass of Cheryl Cole and the punch of a prize fighter".

== Cast and characters ==
=== Main cast ===
- Sadie Jenkins (Georgia Lock) – Sadie, more commonly referred to as 'Sadie J' or 'Sass', is a teenage girl who often takes advantage of her friends' talents and takes credit for them. Despite this, she always realises what she does wrong and her friends stick by her. She speaks to the camera, and often finds herself stuck in the middle of dilemmas which she resolves with different solutions. She describes herself as the 'only girl in a boy's world', much until the final episode when she learns she will have a new baby sister. Sadie has a boyfriend, Taylor at the beginning of the third series who her father doesn't accept at first, but does so eventually. She is very protective over her younger brother Danny since their mother died when they were young – this was mentioned in Bridesmaidamundo. She is considered a bit of a tomboy, considering she wanted to go with her dad to a car show in Mamalicious.
- Delia "Dede" Baxter (Priyanka Patel) – Dede is one of Sadie's best friends, who commonly refers to her as 'Deeds'. She is displayed as extremely clever and determined to achieve 100% in every aspect of life. She does not have much in common with Sadie, but she is often taken advantage of and has her talents exploited. For example, Dede appears to have 'the voice of Mariah Carey' in Promalicious – when Sadie is determined to prove herself as a fantastic singer, she uses Dede's voice and mimes so that she is no longer a social outcast. She loves the show 'Space Cargo'. Her mother, Maddy is the complete opposite, and is an obsessive fan of JLS.
- Christopher "Kit" Karter (Ronan Carter) – Kit is a flamboyant teenager. He always participates in productions and is a celebrity follower. It is also revealed that he has a secret talent for cooking. He has common interests with Sadie in that both of them want to be at the top of the social hierarchy. He is commonly referred to as the 'Kitty Kat' by other characters. He is best friends with Sadie and Dede. He is considered to be quite self-centered. In the third series, his parents get a divorce – but Sadie uses this for her own purpose to get tickets to see One Direction to make him feel better. Kit does not react positively to this, and is irritated at Sadie's constant self-centered attitude. She advises him to follow his heart, after which he decides to move to Brazil with his dad much to the upset of Dede and Sadie.
- Danny Jenkins (Will Nye) – Danny is Sadie's outgoing younger brother who is protective of him he is always up to mischief with his best friend Jake. Despite not having much luck with girls compared to Jake, he seems to have some knowledge as to how to impress them after reading a few pages in Sadie's magazines – in Mamalicious, he helps Keith reason with his girlfriend and get her to forgive him with which he succeeds. Keith enlists his help on a date in return for a video game by instructing him via Bluetooth, but Danny proceeds to leave with the game instead leaving Keith to fend for himself.
- Jake Healy (Bobby Fuller) – Jake is Danny's best friend and is considered the more calm and sophisticated of the two. He is shown to have more luck with girls than Danny.
- Vanda Viazani (Mel Giedroyc) – Vanda, commonly known as 'Ms. V', is the owner of the Y-Diner which Sadie, Dede and Kit often visit. She is described as 'scary diner owner' by Sadie in the theme tune. She is Russian and portrayed as a strict woman, determined to make her diner the best business. She shows a lighter side in the third series.
- Steve Jenkins (Steve Spiers) – Steve is Sadie and Danny's father and runs a mechanic business from his garage called "Mr Motors". He stands up for Sadie and his character is a kind, but gruff person who can be considered 'uncool' and loves his family. In the third series, he tells Sadie that he has been dating Beverley, who runs a salon. He has tried his hand at dancing which doesn't impress anyone.
- Keith Woods (Alfie Stewart) – Keith is Steve's mechanical apprentice. He is shown to have extremely low and emotional intelligence which gets on Steve's nerves, and is shown to be quite lazy. Steve's old friend Gary Gilmott offers him the job of manager in the final episode when Steve proceeds to sell the garage due to going bankrupt, which shocks Steve. He decides to stay with Steve, but changes his mind a while later. Gary then discovers he isn't cut out for the job of manager. He lives at the Jenkins' house since the beginning of the second series and has a nan who visits him time to time. Keith happens to have a different girlfriend in each episode, and once asked for Danny's help for a date, but is always unsuccessful.
- Chloe (Rose Liston) – Chloe was a waitress at the Y-Diner in the first series. She was referred to by Sadie as 'Trog face'. She was the beautiful Canadian girl who Sadie J dreamed of being like.
- Ashlii Summers (Nina Jaspaul) – Ashlii is Sadie's nemesis introduced at the beginning of the second series. She is the daughter of Beverley, Steve's girlfriend. She blackmails Sadie and treats her like a slave. In series 3, she becomes Danny and Sadie's stepsister after her mother and Sadie's father become engaged, and they become friends.
- Rico (Alan Hall) (Series 3) – Rico is an assistant at Bev's salon and assists Sadie when she searches for a new 'bling friend' after Kit leaves. She realises that Rico would be the bling friend she is looking for. He is of Spanish descent.
- Beverley "Bev" Summers (Sharlene Whyte) – Bev is Steve's girlfriend and the mother of Ashlii. She runs her own salon. In the final episode it is revealed that she is pregnant with Steve's child.
- Roger the Dog (Cracker) – Sadie's dog who is frequently seen.

=== Recurring cast ===
- Imogen (Daniella Eames) – Imogen is Danny and Jake's 'frenemy, and previously Jake's girlfriend. She usually beats them at video games. She makes regular appearances in the first two series.
- Whitney Landon (Georgina Campbell) – Whitney is a cheerleader and is a rival of Sadie's. She always attempts to put others down, like in Cocolocolistic, in which she tricks Kit into being her manager. She appears in the first two series on a regular basis.
- Taylor Bell (Thulani Storm Sityata) – Taylor is first introduced at the start of the second series and instantly becomes Sadie's crush, who is initially heartbroken upon finding out that he is Ashlii's boyfriend. He is of American descent. In the episode Bardalicious, they finally admit their feeling for each other. At the start of the third series, they appear to be dating and in love, but Sadie is at first hesitant to tell her father, who, when she does eventually tell him, does not allow her to see Taylor at first but comes to accept him. He tries to encourage Sadie to do the right thing.
- Theresa Babcock (Eleanor Rowe) – Theresa is Dede's friend who, in the first series, did not speak much, but eventually did to advise Dede when she made a wrong decision.
- Gary Gilmott (Robbie Gee) – Gary is Steve's childhood friend who appears in Slumbalicious where he and Steve meet for the first time in many years. He appears again in Bieberbopalicious taking over the garage for a week while Steve is away which worries Keith. He appears again in the final episode where he states that he'll be taking over Steve's garage, and offers Keith the job of manager which startles Steve. He initially decides not to take the offer because he didn't want to leave Steve in the lurch, but Steve accepts the offer on his behalf – however, he ends up blowing up the car's engine which makes Gary rethink his decision.

=== Additional characters ===
- Yollo (Jay Worley) – Yollo is Kit's Welsh cousin who appears in Gagalicious and likes rugby and sport, whereas Kit is the complete opposite. Upon seeing his picture, Sadie constantly asks Kit to hook her up with Yollo. Kit is worried that Yollo would judge and hate him for his different nature. Sadie feels that Yollo is judging him and therefore tells him that Kit hates him, but Yollo proclaims that as cousins/mates, he would like him no matter whatever he likes and could never hate him, after which Sadie states she became lost in translation.
- Captain Skylo (Robert Evans) – Captain Skylo (also known as Tom Roberts) is Dede's hero who she originally craves to meet. He appears in the episode 'Bridesmaidamundo' when Dede attends a book signing to find that the real Captain Skylo isn't what she expected. He reappears in 'Dinnerlicious', when he is a TV presenter and presents Dede's new product.

=== Special guest appearances ===
Throughout the show, there have been special guest appearances, including:

- Pixie Lott – Pixie Lott appeared in part 2 of "Pixiepopalistic". She thanked Sadie for a 'great party'.
- Little Mix – Little Mix appeared at the end of season 3, episode 5 "Littlemixamondo".
- Paul Hollywood – Hollywood appeared in the final episode of the series, as Ms. V's new boyfriend.

== Ratings ==
Viewing figures from BARB:

=== Series 1 ===
| Episode no. | Airdate | Total viewers | CBBC Weekly Ranking |
|---|---|---|---|
| 1 | 14 January 2011 | 275,000 | —N/a |
| 2 | 21 January 2011 | 312,000 | —N/a |
| 3 | 28 January 2011 | 423,000 | 2 |
| 4 | 4 February 2011 | 428,000 | 4 |
| 5 | 11 February 2011 | 409,000 | 4 |
| 6 | 18 February 2011 | 373,000 | 3 |
| 7 | 25 February 2011 | 274,000 | —N/a |
| 8 | 4 March 2011 | 360,000 | 8 |
| 9 | 11 March 2011 | 406,000 | 2 |
| 10 | 18 March 2011 | 277,000 | —N/a |
| 11 | 18 March 2011 | 289,000 | —N/a |
| 12 | 25 March 2011 | 287,000 | —N/a |
| 13 | 25 March 2011 | 270,000 | —N/a |

=== Series 2 ===
| Episode no. | Airdate | Total viewers | CBBC Weekly Ranking |
|---|---|---|---|
| 1 | 25 January 2012 | 340,000 | —N/a |
| 2 | 1 February 2012 | 362,000 | —N/a |
| 3 | 8 February 2012 | 298,000 | —N/a |
| 4 | 15 February 2012 | 219,000 | —N/a |
| 5 | 22 February 2012 | 399,000 | 10 |
| 6 | 29 February 2012 | 393,000 | 7 |
| 7 | 7 March 2012 | 336,000 | 8 |
| 8 | 14 March 2012 | 208,000 | —N/a |
| 9 | 15 March 2012 | 280,000 | —N/a |
| 10 | 21 March 2012 | 212,000 | —N/a |
| 11 | 22 March 2012 | 238,000 | —N/a |
| 12 | 28 March 2012 | 214,000 | —N/a |
| 13 | 29 March 2012 | 215,000 | —N/a |

=== Series 3 ===
| Episode no. | Airdate | Total viewers | CBBC Weekly Ranking |
|---|---|---|---|
| 1 | 23 January 2013 | 327,000 | —N/a |
| 2 | 30 January 2013 | 271,000 | —N/a |
| 3 | 6 February 2013 | 295,000 | —N/a |
| 4 | 13 February 2013 | 330,000 | 8 |
| 5 | 20 February 2013 | 209,000 | —N/a |
| 6 | 27 February 2013 | 244,000 | —N/a |
| 7 | 6 March 2013 | 216,000 | —N/a |
| 8 | 13 March 2013 | 231,000 | —N/a |
| 9 | 20 March 2013 | 246,000 | —N/a |
| 10 | 27 March 2013 | 223,000 | —N/a |

== Development and production ==
The series was filmed at Elstree Studios in London.

The series was created by Robert Evans and produced by Paul McKenzie. It is based on Evans' real life niece Sadie and her younger brother Danny (who also share their names with the onscreen brother and sister).

== Music ==
=== Theme song ===
The theme song, "In a Boy's World", performed by Georgia Lock, was available to download on iTunes but later had been removed. In the second series it was revamped with a different beat and melody, as with the third series.

=== Soundtrack ===
A soundtrack for the show was to be released sometime in 2013. It will include songs from and inspired by the show, including original songs by Georgia Lock alongside other songs by artists such as The Wanted and Cheryl Cole. This idea was probably scrapped as of the final episode.

In early 2013, a complete boxset of Sadie J was announced by BBC, to be released in Christmas 2013. However, on 1 November 2013, BBC stated that since the soundtrack was postponed, there would not be a point to make a DVD.
