= Georgie Farmer =

English actor

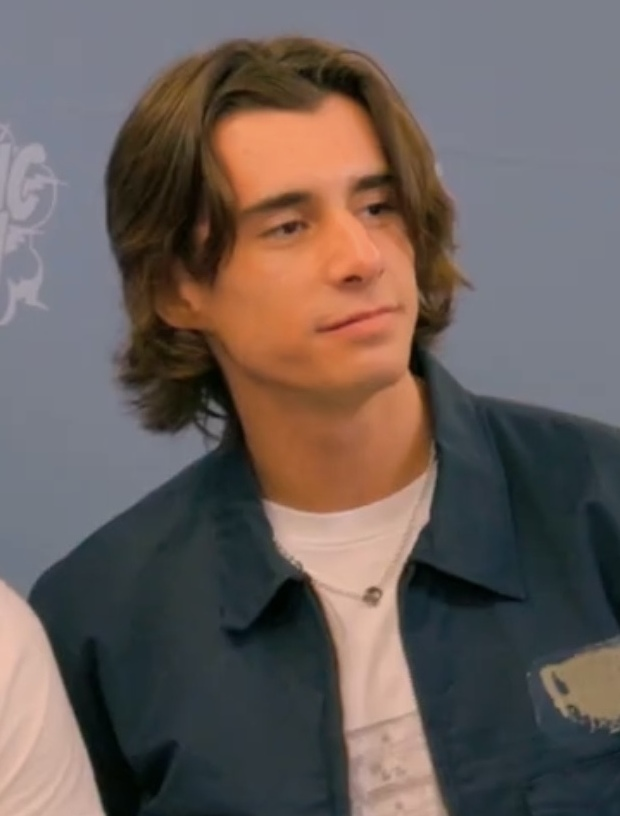
- Farmer at the 2023 German Comic Con
- Born: Georgie Bleu Farmer; 26 May 2002 (age 23); Leytonstone, London, England
- Occupation: Actor
- Years active: 2011–present

Georgie Bleu Farmer (born 26 May 2002) is an English actor. He is known for his roles in the Disney Channel series The Evermoor Chronicles (2014–2017) and the Netflix series Wednesday (2022–present). He also starred in the film LifeHack (2025).

== Early life ==
Farmer was born and raised in Leytonstone, East London. He has three older brothers including Harry, who is known for his acting and stage credits. At the age of eight, Farmer began to take Saturday classes at the Stage One Theatre School. He went on to attend Sylvia Young Theatre School, where he appeared in the music video for Jessie J's 2011 single "Who's Laughing Now".

== Career ==
In 2012, Farmer began his theatre career with the play Rest Upon the Wind at the Tristan Bates Theatre in London, and Unity Theatre in Liverpool. He went to appear in the National Theatre production of Emil and the Detectives as Toots the following year. The same year, he made his television debut on the CBBC series The Ministry of Curious Stuff. From 2014 to 2017, Farmer starred in the Disney Channel British television series The Evermoor Chronicles as Jake Crossley, for the show's two seasons. He also had a minor role in Ill Behaviour (2017).

Farmer made his feature film debut with a minor role in Steven Spielberg's 2018 adaptation of Ready Player One. He also had a voice role as a wolf in Andy Serkis' Mowgli: Legend of the Jungle (2018), originally set to be distributed by Warner Bros. Pictures who later sold it to Netflix. In 2019, he made guest appearances in the British medical soap opera Doctors and the American action television show Treadstone, the latter being a spin-off from the Bourne franchise. Farmer returned to the stage in 2020 with the play For the Sake of the Argument at Bridewell Theatre, written and directed by his brother Harry and based on the life experiences of British and American author and journalist Christopher Hitchens.

In 2021, Farmer was cast in Tim Burton's Netflix adaptation of The Addams Family, the series titled Wednesday based on the titular character of the same name. He starred as a gorgon named Ajax Petropolus, and researched the mythology behind gorgons prior to filming. The show's first season premiered on Netflix on 23 November 2022, while the second season was released in two parts in August and September 2025. It was later renewed for a third season.

Farmer starred in Ronan Corrigan's debut action film LifeHack, which premiered at the 2025 South by Southwest film festival. For his role, Farmer was longlisted for the British Independent Film Award for Breakthrough Performance.

== Filmography ==
Key
†	Denotes film or TV productions that have not yet been released

=== Film ===
Film appearances
Year	Title	Role	Notes	Ref.
2018	Ready Player One	Kid		
2018	Samira's Party	Samad	Short film	
2018	Mowgli: Legend of the Jungle	Wolf	Voice role	
2020	Of Wolves and Lambs	Brother	Short film	
2025	LifeHack	Kyle		

=== Television ===
Television appearances
Year	Title	Role	Notes	Ref.
2012	The Ministry of Curious Stuff	—N/a	13 episodes	
2014–2017	The Evermoor Chronicles	Jake Crossley	Main role	
2017	Ill Behaviour	Gamer	2 episodes	
2019	Doctors	Max Morgan	Episode: "Belly"	
2019	Treadstone	Gabe Becker	2 episodes	
2022–present	Wednesday	Ajax Petropolus	Main role	

=== Music videos ===
Music video appearances
Year	Title	Artist	Role	Ref.
2011	"Who's Laughing Now"	Jessie J	Student	

== Stage ==
Year	Title	Role	Notes	Refs.
2012	Rest Upon the Wind	—N/a	Tristan Bates Theatre, London / Unity Theatre, Liverpool	
2013	Emil and the Detectives	Toots	Royal National Theatre, London	
2020	For the Sake of Argument	Mark Bradley	Bridewell Theatre, London	

== Accolades ==
Award	Year (Note: Indicates the year of ceremony. Each year is linked to the article about the awards held that year, wherever possible.)	Category	Work	Result	Ref.
British Independent Film Awards	2025	Breakthrough Performance	LifeHack	Longlisted	
