= Jackson Ryan =

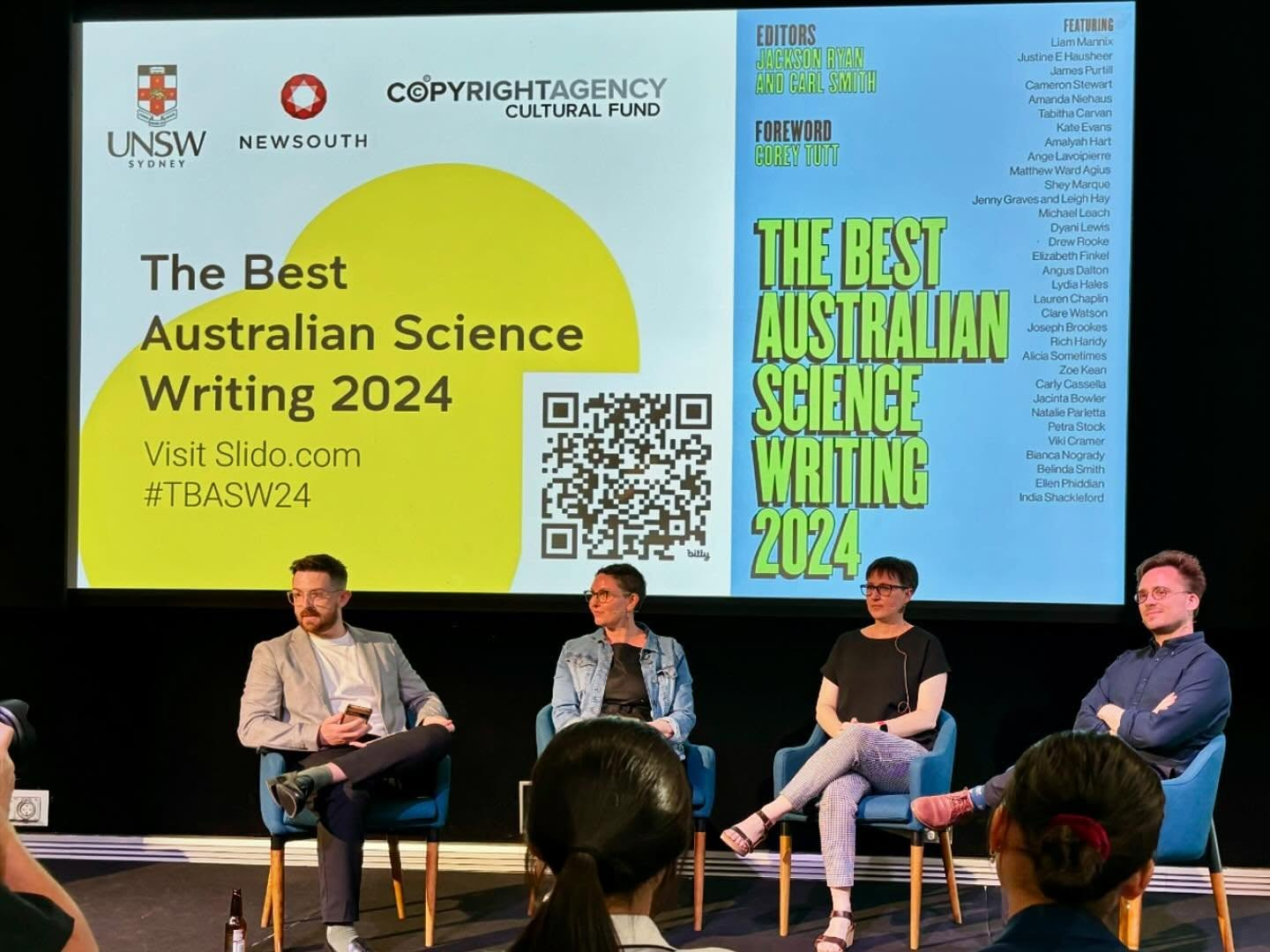
Best of Australian Science Writing launch, November 2024. Left to right: Jackson W. Ryan, Amanda Niehaus, Dyani Lewis, Carl Smith.

Jackson W. Ryan is an Australian science journalist and editor. He has worked in science, technology and video game journalism. He was science editor of the technology publication CNET from 2019 to 2023 and has been the president of the Science Journalists Association of Australia (SJAA) since 2023.

Ryan was awarded the Australian Museum Eureka Prize for Science Journalism in 2022. He has also been included in The Best Australian Science Writing anthology in multiple years and was co-editor with Carl Smith in 2024. His work has been published in The New York Times, The Guardian, The Monthly, Particle and several other prominent publications.

== Journalism career ==
Ryan began his journalism career writing about science and technology, while also working in Australian technology and gaming media. He worked at CNET between 2018 and 2023. He also appeared as a presenter on the Disney Channel Australia. He won the Australian Museum Eureka Prize for Science Journalism in 2022.

Ryan joined the Australian Broadcasting Corporation as a science and technology reporter in 2023, before returning to freelance journalism in 2024. His subsequent work has included investigative and long-form reporting for Australian and international publications. In 2024, he also co-edited The Best Australian Science Writing 2024 with ABC science journalist Carl Smith.

Ryan's recent work includes writing about the state of Australian science journalism and the changing Australian media landscape. In 2024, he wrote for The Guardian about the use of artificial intelligence-generated material by Cosmos magazine and its implications for trust in science and journalism. In 2025, The Monthly published his essay "Into the void", examining the decline of specialist science journalism in Australia following the closure of Cosmos magazine.

From April to October 2025, Ryan was a Journalist in Residence at the Heidelberg Institute for Theoretical Studies (HITS). He was also one of the 2026 Constructive Institute Asia Pacific Fellows.

As president of the SJAA, Ryan has advocated for professional standards, independence and sustainability in Australian science journalism. The SJAA has also supported journalism through grants, professional development and partnerships.

Ryan also investigates research misconduct, while aiming not to reduce trust in science. He says finding a balance "like walking the tightrope above a pool of piranhas". He further unpacks the challenges of reporting on research misconduct through his email newsletter No Breakthroughs.

In 2026, Ryan and colleague Mark Serrels ran a Kickstarter to fund a new video game magazine called CONTINUE?

== Selected publications ==
- "Into the void" — The Monthly
- "Cosmos magazine's AI-generated articles are bad for trust in science" — The Guardian
- The Best Australian Science Writing 2024 — co-editor with Carl Smith
