= Rip Tide (film) =

- Directed by: Rhiannon Bannenberg
- Written by: Georgia Harrison
- Produced by: Steve Jaggi
- Starring: Debby Ryan; Genevieve Hegney; Andrew Creer; Naomi Sequeira
- Cinematography: Tania Lambert
- Edited by: Adrian Powers
- Music by: John Spence
- Release dates: 10 June 2017 (SFF); 21 September 2017 (AUS)
- Running time: 85 minutes
- Country: Australia
- Language: English
- Box office: $360,000 (AUS)

Rip Tide is a 2017 Australian teen drama film. The movie was directed by Rhiannon Bannenberg, produced by Steve Jaggi and written by Georgia Harrison. It stars Debby Ryan. The coming-of-age film follows an American model (Ryan) who travels to an Australian beach town to reconnect with her family and her aspirations.

== Plot ==
Cora Hamilton becomes overwhelmed with the constraints of her New York modelling work, while her ambitious mother, Sofia, works to secure her a lucrative contract with a popular agency. At a photoshoot, Cora tries to provide her own ideas on improving one of the outfits that she is modeling, but is rejected by Fairret, the director, causing her to run out in an emotional state. While this is happening, a video is filmed of a disheveled Cora falling down the stairs, which goes viral, much to her humiliation.

The video creates a lot of negative attention, which puts both Cora's and Sofia's careers into jeopardy. Upon seeing a birthday card from her Aunt Margot, whom she has not seen since she was a child, Cora decides to go to Australia to stay with her. Sofia and Cora have an argument in the airport about the situation, during which Cora tells Sofia that she is not running away, but going in the direction her life is taking her. She then departs, leaving her mother in confusion.

Cora arrives in the Australian beach town and is welcomed in by the laidback community, soon striking up a friendship with the bubbly Chicka. With Chicka's encouragement, Cora learns to surf. A romantic relationship soon follows with local surfing instructor, Tom.

Cora is encouraged by Margot, Margot's mother-in-law Bee, and Chicka to help at an upcoming festival. She is given a sewing machine and encouraged to design her own collection based on post-war swimwear. The longer she stays with Margot, Cora realizes that her aunt has unresolved grief over the drowning of her husband, Caleb.

Sofia has negotiated a lucrative deal for Cora to be the face of a new season campaign for a New York fashion house. Cora is faced with a dilemma to either stay or return to her fast-paced New York career. Cora chooses to miss her flight when the prop plane refuses to carry her beloved sewing machine. She returns in time to rescue her aunt who had gone surfing during the approaching storm. The local festival is headlined by Cora's designer fashion show, at which her mother shows up unannounced and makes peace with her daughter and sister.

== Cast ==
- Debby Ryan as Cora Hamilton
- Genevieve Hegney as Margot
- Andrew Creer as Tom
- Naomi Sequeira as Chicka
- Valerie Bader as Bee
- Aaron Jeffery as Owen
- Jeremy Lindsay Taylor as Caleb
- Danielle Carter as Sofia
- Kimie Tsukakoshi as Lily
- Marcus Graham as Farriet

== Production ==
Production began on the feature in late 2016. The film was shot in Illawarra and the Southern Highlands, on the South Coast of New South Wales in Australia.

Debby Ryan was cast as the central character Cora, after previously starring on the Disney Channel series Jessie (2011–15). Ryan stated that she enjoyed the "freedom" of working in Australia, and noted the similarities between herself and her character in "finding herself".

== Release ==
Rip Tide debuted at the Sydney Film Festival on 10 June 2017, and also played at the CinefestOz film festival in Western Australia.

The film was released in selected Australian cinemas in September 2017.

Rip Tide was released internationally on Netflix in January 2018.
