= Naomi Sequeira =

Australian actress, singer and songwriter (born 1994)

- Born: 29 December 1994 (age 31); Sydney, New South Wales, Australia
- Occupations: Actress, singer
- Years active: 2012–present
- Known for: The Evermoor Chronicles

Naomi Sequeira (born 29 December 1994) is an Australian actress, singer, and songwriter.

She was the co-host of Disney Channel Australia's Hanging with Adam & Naomi with Adam Roberts and was nominated for a 2015 Astra Award for most outstanding presenter for Hanging with.

In 2014, she began in the lead role of Tara Crossley in the Disney Channel drama series. The Evermoor Chronicles, filmed in England and aired in 160 countries. Sequeira's debut single, Blank Paper, was released on 1 March 2016, and her first EP was released later that year. She currently resides in Sydney, Australia.

== Filmography ==
=== Film ===
Year	Title	Role	Notes
2012	Shoebox	Emily	Short
2017	Rip Tide	Chicka	
2023	Finally Me: A Cheerleader's Dream	Melody Cruz	

=== Television ===
Year	Title	Role	Notes
2013–2015	Hanging with Adam & Naomi	Host	
2014	Rake	May	1 episode
2014–2016	The Evermoor Chronicles	Tara Crossley	Lead role
2018	Pearl in Paradise	Daniela	Supporting role
2019	Romance On The Menu	Beth	
2020	Reckoning	Zoey	2 episodes
2020	Deadhouse Dark	Marti	1 episode
2020	Axmo Deus	Peta	1 episode
2023–	Paper Dolls	Annabel Tonkin	Lead role
2024	Return to Paradise	Jade McCready	1 episode

== Awards ==
Year	Award	Category	Nominee(s)	Result	Ref.
2014	ASTRA Awards	Favourite Personality - Female	Naomi Sequeira - Hanging with Adam & Naomi	Nominated	
2015	ASTRA Awards	Most Outstanding Presenter - Female	Naomi Sequeira - Hanging with Adam & Naomi	Nominated	
