= The Evermoor Chronicles =

- Genre: Mystery
- Created by: Diane Whitley; Tim Compton
- Starring: Naomi Sequeira; Finney Cassidy; Georgia Lock; Jordan Loughran; George Sear; Georgie Farmer; Alex Starke; Sammy Moore; India Ria Amarteifio; Clive Rowe; Sharon Morgan; Georgie Glen; Ben Radcliffe; Scarlett Murphy; Ben Hull; Christopher Brand
- Opening theme: "Forevermoor" performed by Naomi Sequeira (series 1) "Forevermoor" performed by Jasmine Elcock (series 2)
- Country of origin: United Kingdom
- Original language: English
- No. of series: 2
- No. of episodes: 36

Production
- Executive producers: Rebecca Hodgson; Bede Blake
- Producer: Tim Compton
- Production companies: Lime Pictures; All3Media

Original release
- Network: Disney Channel
- Release: 10 October 2014 – 14 June 2017

The Evermoor Chronicles is a British television series that aired on Disney Channel. It was produced by Lime Pictures with filming taking place in the spring of 2014. The series premiered on 10 October 2014 on Disney Channel in the United Kingdom, on 17 October 2014 on Disney Channel in the United States and Family Channel in Canada, and on 31 October 2014 on Disney Channel in Australia and New Zealand.

On 19 March 2015, the miniseries was picked up for a full series of a further 20 episodes and was confirmed under the new title of The Evermoor Chronicles as a continuation to the original. On 5 September 2015, filming for the first season was completed. An announcement by Disney EMEA at the International Kids Emmys confirmed The Evermoor Chronicles would be returning for a second series of 12 episodes, after attracting 5.3 million viewers in its first quarter on air.

To run alongside the main TV series, a web series of mini-episodes called the Evermoor Confidential Chronicles was launched. Each episode features one of the characters recording a vlog in a secret scene taking place in-between each episode from the main series. Each one gives a spoiler of what is to come in the next episode of the TV series. The series follows Tara and Bella Crossley with Otto's aid as they try to solve mysteries across Evermoor and to protect Evermoor from the evil forces.

== Plot ==
The miniseries and the first series star Tara Crossley, an American teen who moves from the United States to an English village called Evermoor. As her mother and stepfather unpack at their new home, Tara, her brother, and her British step-siblings adjust to their new life.

The second series stars Bella as she tries to apply for fashion school in London. When Davorin, an evil man who is trapped inside a magic mirror, breaks Ludo into splinters, Bella and her friends must find Ludo's splinters before wish making chaos begins across the village of Evermoor.

== Characters ==
=== Main ===
- Tara Crossley (Naomi Sequeira, pilot – season 1) is the only member of the family who has been to Evermoor before to visit her aunt Bridget when she was little and is the most excited about living there. She is Jake's sister and Seb and Bella's stepsister. She enjoys writing stories and because of this she has an overactive imagination. In the show she solves mysteries in the manor where she meets the founders and finds out later on that she is the Supreme Everine, but she gives her identity to Bella to trick Esmerelda. Over the course of the series, she becomes the main enemy of the founders, and she loses her powers but tries her hardest to protect Evermoor without them, all while balancing life with her family, school and her tumultuous romance with Cameron. During this time, she smashed the founder lantern, stopping the third founder from being released, while keeping her friends from being turned to stone statuettes and regains her powers in the season finale. Prior to the second season, she becomes the "Taylor Swift of the book world" as Bella says, and leaves Evermoor, as well as Cameron.
  - Sequeira also portrays Tallulah Brinkworth, a fictional character from Fiona's book series based on Tara, briefly brought to life by the tapestry.
- Cameron Marsh (Finney Cassidy) is Tara and Bella's love interest but has chosen Tara and is a Circle Page for the Everines before turning over his position to Seb. His mother Sarah was an Everine who went missing prior to the series, only to discover that she had been turned into a tree. He is shown to have helped Esmeralda to trick Tara so he can find his mother. He has a magical spider, Flynn, that makes the golden thread whose life force is connected to his, hurting him if Flynn were ever harmed. Over the course of season 1, Cameron is turned into a tree, but turns back once Tara kisses him, but knowing he can never kiss her again. He intends to pursue a relationship with her regardless, but Tara eventually drives him away to save Bella's life. At the end of the first season, he becomes an enemy of the founders and as Tara's powers are restored, the curse is broken and they share a proper kiss. In the second season, Cameron and Tara have broken up (prior to the second season) as she has left the village, he has since become a football player and is no longer looking after Flynn. Cameron spends the second season trying to help repair Ludo as he also becomes interested in Alice, whom he comes to love.
- Bella Crossley (Georgia Lock) is Seb's twin sister and Jake and Tara's stepsister. She often gets jealous of how close Tara and Seb are and to make up for the lack of attention she gets from Seb, she flirts with Cameron but eventually calls it off once she realizes that their love was just an illusion. Bella poses as the Supreme Everine to protect Tara's identity but is eventually found out. Later on in the series, she gains an ability to smell emotions from entering the tapestry, though it seems to be gone in the second season for the loss of the tapestry. She is also shown to be a good dancer. At the end of the first season, she becomes an enemy of the founders. In the second season, Bella takes the lead role as she prepares to leave Evermoor for fashion school. She decides to stay after she causes Ludo to be splintered and works to fix him while applying for fashion school again. She becomes smitten with Iggi and remains oblivious to the fact that Otto loves her. Over the course of the second season, towards the finale she finds out who Davorin is and becomes his enemy. In the end of the season, she risks her own life to bring the splinters back to her loved ones and the rest of the villagers, and stopping Davorin for good, she then chooses Otto to leave Evermoor with her after realizing her own feelings for him.
- Sebastian "Seb" Crossley (George Sear, pilot – season 1) is Bella's twin brother and Jake and Tara's stepbrother. He likes to have evidence and proof, before making any conclusions, and keeps Tara grounded. He is quite geeky and is in love with Sorsha. He seems to have a very strong relationship with Tara, which makes Bella very jealous. He cares very much for both his sisters but probably enjoys Tara's company more than that of Bella's. It is shown that he thinks Evermoor is full of nonsense and idiots due to his scientific mindset, but after discovering magic, his whole world of logic crumbles around him, though Sorsha helps him learn to cope with and understand Evermoor's magic, and he eventually becomes Circle Page in order to be with her. At the end of the first season, he becomes an enemy of the founders. Prior to the second season, he wishes with Sorsha to travel the world together.
- Sorsha Doyle (Jordan Loughran, pilot – season 1) is the daughter of Mayor Doyle. Sorsha starts out as an Everine-in-training who immediately falls in love with Seb despite their no boys rule but is willing to bend the rules if she feels that they mean no harm. She promises Seb that she will leave the Circle for him, but after Seb is erased from history, she forgets about her promise and is chosen as the next Everine as he is restored. Despite being chosen, she tries hard to maintain a relationship with Seb in secret while attending her duties as an Everine but eventually reveals their relationship to everyone in order to keep Seb and his family in Evermoor, leading her to be kicked out of the Circle. Her position is later restored in order for the third founder to take over her body, but while her love for Seb protects her, she loses the fight after discovering that Seb had kissed another girl and becomes the third founder. She is later freed by Tara. She leaves with Seb prior to Season Two to travel the world.
- Jake Crossley (Georgie Farmer) – Jake is Tara's brother and Seb and Bella's stepbrother. He is good friends with Ludo and together they enjoy solving 'mini mysteries', but Jake ends up taking the brunt of Ludo's many plans and activities. In Season Two, he returns to Evermoor at the request of Ludo, but becomes more interested in Lacie. He also finds out about the magic of Evermoor in the second season after discovering that Ludo is a ghost. He then decides to stay in Evermoor to grow closer to Lacie, and to help save Ludo.
- Ludicrous "Ludo" Carmichael (Alex Starke) – Ludo is Jake's best friend and the son of Crimson, he spends most of the series teaching Jake about various items, games and mysteries in Evermoor, most of which he doesn't entirely understand, which causes the two to constantly get into some form of trouble. In Season Two, he adopts a dog and names it after Jake because of how much he misses him. He is turned into a ghost by Davorin after he followed Iggi into the caves where Davorin was kept. Over the course of the second season, he and his friends search far and wide across Evermoor for his splinters. At the end of the season, he is restored to his human form.
- Otto (Sammy Moore) Otto is a teen demigod and The Sacred Snoot of Evermoor. After causing 100 days of thunder and stealing his father's chariot, he was banished from his home and forced to live on Earth in the form of an owl-like being called the Sacred Snoot for a remaining 1000 years as of the beginning of the series. Tara becomes his first mortal friend. During their first meeting, it seems that Otto is resistant to Cotton's gillypox. He secretly likes Bella, as Tara, Seb, Sorsha and Cameron know while Bella is unaware. He is shown to be very intelligent and a good dancer. He also has an ex-girlfriend named Valentina, the demigoddess of love, who he is forced to be apart from because of a separation spell his father cast on her, which will wear off after his 1000 years, then they will be reunited. He spends the first season helping Tara with Evermoorian mythology and to better understand its magic, as well as with her various plans to protect Evermoor. At the end of the season, his banishment is lifted as he learns the value of humanity by sacrificing his life for his friends and is revived in the season finale, where his father grants his new friends a wish. In the second season, Otto competes for Bella's affections with Iggi, his little brother. He defeats Davorin in the finale, and he is also chosen by Bella to leave the village with her because they love each other. They leave to London on a bus, whilst Bella goes to fashion school, where they finally kiss.
- Lacie Fairburn (India Ria Amarteifio) – A close friend of Jake an Ludo's who occasionally gets them involved in certain mysteries, Lacie's parents are committed to the traditions of the village, and intend for her to become an Everine someday, however, she would rather become the mayor. She is possessed by the first founder later in the series, but Tara frees her. In the second season, she is shown to be having an interest in Jake after he returns to Evermoor. She teases him throughout the series, showing her attraction to him. Later, she accidentally releases the final crypt stone after hearing Iggi sing the incantation. In the end of the season, she and Jake seem to be together.
- Iggi (Ben Radcliffe, season 2) – Iggi is Otto's younger brother who is the main cause of the threat of Davorin in Season Two after he wishes for a cure for his poisoning and becomes Davorin's servant. He is shown to have feelings for Bella and is at odds with his brother for her affection. He is shown to be a good wrestler. He also happens to be one of those boys who woos and takes girls he thinks are pretty. He is shown to be condescending towards his friends during the times he served Davorin. In the end of the season, Iggi is released from his curse and remains friends with Bella after she chooses Otto.
- Alice Crossley (Scarlett Murphy, season 2) – Alice is Bella's cousin who moves into the manor in Season Two with her father. She is shown to have a troubled past with the wrong crowd, which her father, Jed, worries about. She is Cameron's love interest in the second season, and they eventually become a couple in the finale.
- Rod Crossley (Dan Fredenburgh, pilot) – Rod is the father of Bella and Seb and stepfather of Tara and Jake. Rod spends his time trying to legally prevent the Circle and Mayor Doyle's uninvited comings and goings from his new home, only to fail as Evermoorian laws go against his actions. Rod is the only character from the pilot who does not appear in season 1, with his absence explained as his work always keeps him busy and later works to move his family back to London. In season 2, he moves his family, except Bella, back to London and leaves the house to his younger brother Jed.
- Fiona Crossley (Belinda Stewart-Wilson, pilot – season 1) is the mother of Tara and Jake and stepmother of Bella and Seb, and author of the Tallulah Brinkworth stories which she bases off of Tara. Unaccepting of Evermoorian customs and traditions, Fiona tries to rationally explain ways to improve Evermoor, only to be turned away by everyone she speaks to as her ideas cannot apply. She does, however, allow the Everines full access to the manor and use of the tapestry, much to her own chagrin, and unknown to her is that the only Everines that live in the house are the founders.
- Aunt Bridget (Georgie Glen, pilot – season 1) is Tara's maternal great-aunt. She was the leader of the Everines until she faked her death so Tara can follow her destiny. Later in the first season, it is revealed that she had an older sister named Agatha who was lost to the Moors because the Circle predicted her demise and refused to save her because the rules forbid altering destiny. This leads to her plotting revenge against them by using Tara to turn Cameron's mother into a tree after she discovers her plan and later tricks Tara into giving her Supreme powers over to her in order to create her perfect Evermoor. She later gives away her essence to the Founders in order to complete her plan, who then control her after her plan fails, which disables her hands, preventing her from ever sewing again. She comes to regret her decision after seeing Bella nearly suffer the same fate as Agatha and blows her own cover to the Circle. She gives her power back to Tara after her essence is returned to her and later leaves for Hollowfall at the end of the first season with Agatha, thanks to Tara who forgives her.
- Crimson Carmichael (Margaret Cabourn-Smith) - Housekeeper Crimson is apparently the 'Former Housekeeper', and the mother of Ludo, but they don't seem to be leaving the manor any time soon. In season 1, Fiona rehires Crimson and she takes on odd jobs throughout Evermoor, in the house, the school and the Stumpy Plum store. She becomes Jed's love interest in Season Two.
- Mayor Chester Doyle (Clive Rowe) – Chester is the father of Sorsha and has four jobs; Mayor, lawyer, teacher as well as owning a store called The Stumpy Plum. He disapproves of Sorsha's relationship with Seb but chooses to keep it secret as it would cause her to be expelled from the Circle. It is revealed that he was once a Circle Page in 1985 who was disgraced after the mayor before him destroyed his love for music and his careless actions nearly destroyed the town, causing him to hold a tight grip on his appreciation for music thanks to his past self-performing his old song at the prom and begins bending his own rules for the better. In season 2, he hires Bella's uncle Jed to become Evermoor's newest police officer.
- Esmerelda Dwyer (Sharon Morgan, pilot – season 1) is the new leader of the Everines after Aunt Bridget 'died'. She is quite mysterious and very mean to Tara. She also has a strange preference for Bogvine tea. After losing the Golden Thread, she disbands the Circle briefly, only to reinstate it after finding more, where she predicts the Supreme Everine losing her powers to another, but mistakes Bella for the Supreme Everine. She becomes possessed by the second founder later in the series who uses her position as leader to manipulate and later betray the Circle in order to revive the third Founder, but Tara frees her of it. Prior to the second season, she becomes a baker, and since the Everines make no further appearances while Jed has set up his office in the tapestry room, it is assumed that she has once again disbanded the Circle for good.
- Jed Crossley (Ben Hull, season 2) – Jed is Alice's father and Bella's uncle who moves him and his daughter into Evermoor Manor in the second season after his brother and his family move out. He is hesitant about letting Bella stay with them at first but allows it. He is the village's new sheriff, which he takes very seriously. He is very overprotective of Alice and tries his best to parent her. His love interest is Crimson.
- Davorin (Christopher Brand, season 2) – Davorin is the main antagonist of the second season. He is a wishmaker and seeks to get revenge on the people of Evermoor for being trapped inside a magic mirror. He becomes a major threat to Evermoor after Iggi wishes to be healed before ordering Iggi to raise five crypt stones in order to be free and to destroy the village. Despite being trapped inside the magic mirror, he is able to teleport between mirrors across Evermoor which he uses to communicate with Iggi.

=== Guest ===
- Cotton Lively (Jennie Eggleton, season 1) – Cotton Lively is a 17th-century Everine-in-training with Gillypox who was denied her destiny of joining the Circle and swore revenge. She is accidentally freed by Tara after she saves her sister Bella from being consumed by the tapestry. She returns home after Tara realizes Cotton's dream of fulfilling her destiny and is chosen to be an Everine.
- Valentina (Olivia Holt, season 1) – Valentina is the Goddess of love and Otto's ex-girlfriend, who believed that Otto put a separation spell on her for no reason, keeping her from going to Earth with him. She returns when Otto is transformed into a statuette and she threatens to break him. She realizes her mistake when it turns out that it was Otto's father who cursed her and frees Otto from his curse with a kiss. She returns briefly in the season finale after Otto's sacrifice to warn everyone about the founders and is immediately sent back by them.
- Agatha (Katie Hartland, season 1) – Agatha is the princess of Hollowfall and Bridget's older sister, believed to have been dead the entire time after she was taken by the Moors. She was summoned by Tara and Sebastian to defeat the founders, at the end of the first season. She and Bridget are reunited and leave for Hollowfall at the end of the season.

== Episodes ==
=== Series 1 (2014–2016) ===
The Evermoor Chronicles series 1 episodes
No. overall	No. in season	Title	Directed by	Written by	Original release date	UK viewers (millions)	U.S. viewers (millions)	
1	1	"The Mysterious Village"	Chris Cottam	Bede Blake	10 October 2014	17 October 2014	1.11	1.86
Tara moves to the village of Evermoor after living in America, only to discover her new home houses a tapestry which supposedly predicts the future. When the tapestry predicts a fire at Evermoor Manor, no one in her family, except Tara, believes it is a genuine prediction. Shortly after, Bella discovers a fire at the manor, and things start to get complicated.
2	2	"Fire in House"	Chris Cottam	Bede Blake	17 October 2014	17 October 2014	1.09	1.86
Tara and Seb investigate what caused the fire, only to discover clues that suggest Aunt Bridget may have been murdered by poison.
3	3	"Magical Typewriter"	Chris Cottam	Bede Blake	24 October 2014	24 October 2014	1.69	1.61
Esmerelda reveals to the other everines that the symbol means that a supreme everine is coming and that they haven't woven a real prediction since the Crossley's arrival, Esmeralda planned the fire and that they don't have any more golden thread, Tara discovers this by overhearing their conversation, she also discovers that a piece of golden thread is in The Typewriter so that's why whatever you type comes true. She also discovers that Aunt Bridget is still alive! Meanwhile, Seb accidentally drinks the poison and collapses...
4	4	"Supreme Everine"	Chris Cottam	Bede Blake	31 October 2014	24 October 2014	2.21	1.45
Tara has to find out a way to save her family from disappearing from Evermoor because Esmeralda unpicks their family thread. Tara discovers that she is the Supreme Everine.
5	5	"Normal"	Rebecca Rycroft	Bede Blake	9 November 2015	1.20		
Tara has saved her family from extinction. Esmerelda is getting closer to working out the Supreme Everine’s identity. Tara tries to throw her off the scent but it goes horribly wrong.
6	6	"Weaving Bad"	Rebecca Rycroft	Bede Blake	10 November 2015	1.14		
Cotton Lively, a former Everine, comes out from the rip in the Tapestry that Tara made. She infected with Gillypox, a highly contagious disease and wants to get revenge on the Everines.
7	7	"Night of the Stench"	Rebecca Rycroft	Bede Blake	16 November 2015	1.16		
Tara finds out she is the cause of Cameron's fate and she must wait until the bell rang to see him, but what if the bell is rung early for someone. Meanwhile, Seb and Sorsha look for Cameron's mother and make an unexpected discovery.
8	8	"Drifty"	Rebecca Rycroft	Bede Blake	17 November 2015	0.98		
Fiona finds Tara's old teddy bear, Drifty, and fixes him with golden thread. However, not only does the thread make him talk, his lullaby makes people go to sleep forever.
9	9	"Tallulah Brinkworth Meets Her Match"	Rebecca Rycroft	Bede Blake	23 November 2015	1.50		
Tara hatches a plan to pull her magical self out of the tapestry to help defeat Bridget. Instead she pulls out Tallulah Brinkworth, her fictional alter-ego. Meanwhile, Bridget makes a terrible pact with the Founder Everines.
10	10	"Forevermoor"	Jordan Hogg	Bede Blake	24 November 2015	1.42		
Tara wakes up in Bridget’s dream-like version of Evermoor. She and the whole village are under Bridget’s spell. Can Otto wake Tara up so she can destroy Bridget’s kingdom?
11	11	"Day of Hearts"	Jordan Hogg	Julie Bower	30 November 2015	1.00		
Two of the three Founders have now taken villagers as hosts but Tara smashed the lantern before the third Founder could be released. So the Founders plot their revenge on her.
12	12	"The Labours of Bella"	Jordan Hogg	Neil Jones	1 December 2015	0.90		
Tara has a terrible admission to make to Cameron. Bella learns the cost of lying when Esmerelda makes her take an exam to prove her right to the title Supreme Everine.
13	13	"Spellbound"	Jordan Hogg	Sarah Courtauld	7 December 2015	0.90		
Tara convinces Cameron to set Flynn the spider to cut off their final tie with magic. Meanwhile, the Evermoor High students participate in the annual spelling bee, Spellbound.
14	14	"Nothing Rhymes with Cameron"	Jordan Hogg	Bede Blake	8 December 2015	0.82		
Tara gets golden thread on her watch and can turn back time, which is useful when a humiliating poem about Cameron goes public.
15	15	"Twist of Fate"	Graeme Harper	Sarah Courtauld	15 February 2016	N/A		
As Circle Page, it is Seb's job to guard the tapestry from any intruders. However, it is prom night, so he and Tara get a tapestry leaker - a past Circle Page called Chess - to guard it instead.
16	16	"A Fuffwah too Far"	Graeme Harper	Bede Blake	16 February 2016	N/A		
The tapestry has been stolen and Tara is the scapegoat. Sorsha is expelled from the Circle and Otto meets a terrible fate.
17	17	"Valentina"	Graeme Harper	Neil Jones	17 February 2016	N/A		
Otto has been turned into a statuette by the lantern, and needs true love's kiss to bring him back to life. Fortunately, the beautiful demi-goddess of love, Valentina, has just appeared on Earth. The only problem is, she is Otto's ex-girlfriend, and she is angry at him for breaking up with her.
18	18	"Operation Lights Out"	Graeme Harper	Sarah Courtauld	18 February 2016	N/A		
Sorsha's Worry-No-More dolls have made Tara crazy. She uses Bella's purple cloak, and scares Bella. Tara loses her dolls while running around, and Jake and Ludo pick them up to put in their Casket of Eternity. Cameron, who has gone to check on Tara, finds them and throws them into the lake, stopping their curse. Sorsha and Tara both go back to normal, but Tara quickly realises that Bella is in danger and rushes back to the manor.
19	19	"Being Bella"	Graeme Harper	Bede Blake	22 February 2016	N/A		
Bella is now a statuette. Tara must make Cameron fall for Bella so he will kiss her to make her human again, but the only way she can do that is to pretend to be Bella.
20	20	"The Science of Seb"	Steve Hughes	Neil Jones	29 February 2016	N/A		
The third Founder has gone into Sorsha, but she is resisting it with her love for Seb. Esmerelda and Lacie turn their spider into a pretty girl to entice Seb away from Sorsha and allow the Founder to completely take over her. Meanwhile, Tara and Otto discover who has been taken over by the founders.
21	21	"The Rise of Hollowfall"	Steve Hughes	Tim Compton	7 March 2016	N/A		
Evermoorian legend dictates that when Hollowfall rises, a champion must be selected to venture there. Seb volunteers to impress Sorsha, but as she now contains a Founder, Tara and Otto need to keep them together to stop the Founder from taking her over.
22	24	"New Flames"	Steve Hughes	Paul Gerstenberger	14 March 2016	N/A		
Tara has promised Esmerelda and Lacie that she will break up Seb and Sorsha to allow the Founder to take over Sorsha.
23	23	"The Egg and the Snoot"	Steve Hughes	Bede Blake	21 March 2016	N/A		
After the founders cursed Evermoor the only chance to rescue is solving a puzzle Otto got from his father before he were banished but because of their distress it'll have unexpected consequences.
24	24	"Nevermoor"	Steve Hughes	Bede Blake	28 March 2016	N/A		
After Sorsha lost against the founder in her the three now united founders try to destroy Evermoor and the only chance to save it is to release the princess of Hollowfall. But there is another problem, Agatha put Sorsha, Esmerelda and Lacie in danger. Can Tara free the founders from their bodies and save them before they are eaten by the bog?

=== Series 2 (2017) ===
Series 2 of The Evermoor Chronicles was confirmed via Disney Channel UK's 2017 video on YouTube. Main characters Georgia Lock, Sammy Moore, Finney Cassidy, Georgie Farmer, Alex Starke, Margaret Cabourn-Smith, Clive Rowe, and India Ria Amarteifio return. New additions to the main cast include Ben Radcliffe as Iggi, Otto's brother, Scarlett Murphy as Alice Crossley, Bella's cousin, Ben Hull as Jed Crossley, Bella's uncle and Alice's father, and Christopher Brand as Davorin, an evil man trapped inside a magic mirror. A brand new plot, opening theme song, and new cast members were made for the second series. The new series premiered Monday, May 8, 2017.

The Evermoor Chronicles series 2 episodes
No. overall	No. in season	Title	Directed by	Written by	Original release date	UK viewers (millions)
25	1	"Splintered"	Paul Cotter	Bede Blake	8 May 2017	N/A
Bella is set to leave for fashion school, but when a mysterious man in a magic mirror shatters Ludo into magical splinters, she realizes she must stay to fix Ludo.
26	2	"The Things They Say About Alice"	Paul Cotter	Neil Jones	15 May 2017	N/A
Alice is nervous about her first day at Evermoor High. A magic splinter causes rumours about her to come true and she becomes a rampaging rock star.
27	3	"No Life Crisis"	Paul Cotter	Tim Compton	22 May 2017	N/A
It's Ludo's birthday and Bella is determined to make it the best ever by arranging for Jake to turn up. But Jake wants to hang out with Lacie, Ludo starts to feel truly invisible.
28	4	"Love (Really) Hurts"	Paul Cotter	Bede Blake	29 May 2017	N/A
Otto tries to impress Bella by joining Cameron's wrestling team. He uses a magic splinter to make him a champion wrestler. Bella finds out Otto has cheated.
29	5	"Rags to Riches"	Sarah Walker	Bede Blake	5 June 2017	N/A
Iggi mislays the map of the cryptstones and Alice was the only other person to see it, so Iggi asks her on her first ever date to get the cryptstone locations from her.
30	6	"Dogsbody"	Sarah Walker	Neil Jones	12 June 2017	N/A
Bella stages a fashion show to save her fashion school application. Meanwhile splinter magic causes Jake to inadvertently swap brains with Ludo's dog.
31	7	"El Monsignor's Last Stand"	Sarah Walker	Sarah Courtauld	19 June 2017	N/A
Jed asks Crimson on a date, Alice is determined to stop it. She uses splinter magic to bring to life El Monsignor, Crimson's favorite romantic hero.
32	8	"The Itchies"	Sarah Walker	Paul Gerstenberger	26 June 2017	N/A
Bella invites Harper, a fashion vlogger, to Evermoor, hoping to boost her fashion cred. But soon Bella has another problem - splintered Bog Lice have escaped and are creating the itchiest of problems.
33	9	"Race to Stink Island"	Patrick Harkins	Paul Gerstenberger	3 July 2017	N/A
Ludo remembers he was filming on his phone the night he was shattered. They race to the island to find it. But betrayal and heartbreak also await.
34	10	"Little White Big Fat Lie"	Patrick Harkins	Bede Blake	10 July 2017	N/A
Bella's determined to end Iggi's deception and uses splinter magic to make a truth ray. But Bella hits Alice with the ray, just when she needs to pull off a lie she has told Jed.
35	11	"Showtime!"	Patrick Harkins	Sarah Courtauld	17 July 2017	N/A
It's opening night of the school play, but Bella has bigger worries - Iggi has discovered the last cryptstone is under Evermoor manor -and he's determined to raise it. The school show becomes a major showdown.
36	12	"Vampire Luau"	Patrick Harkins	Bede Blake	24 July 2017	N/A
Unaware that Davorin is free, Bella celebrates being accepted to fashion school and the gang arrange a farewell party - But when Davorin turns up uninvited it's up to Bella and Otto to save Evermoor from his revenge.
