= Embassy of the Philippines, Santiago =

Diplomatic mission of the Philippines in Chile

Embassy of the Philippines, Santiago Pasuguan ng Pilipinas sa Santiago Embajada de Filipinas en Santiago

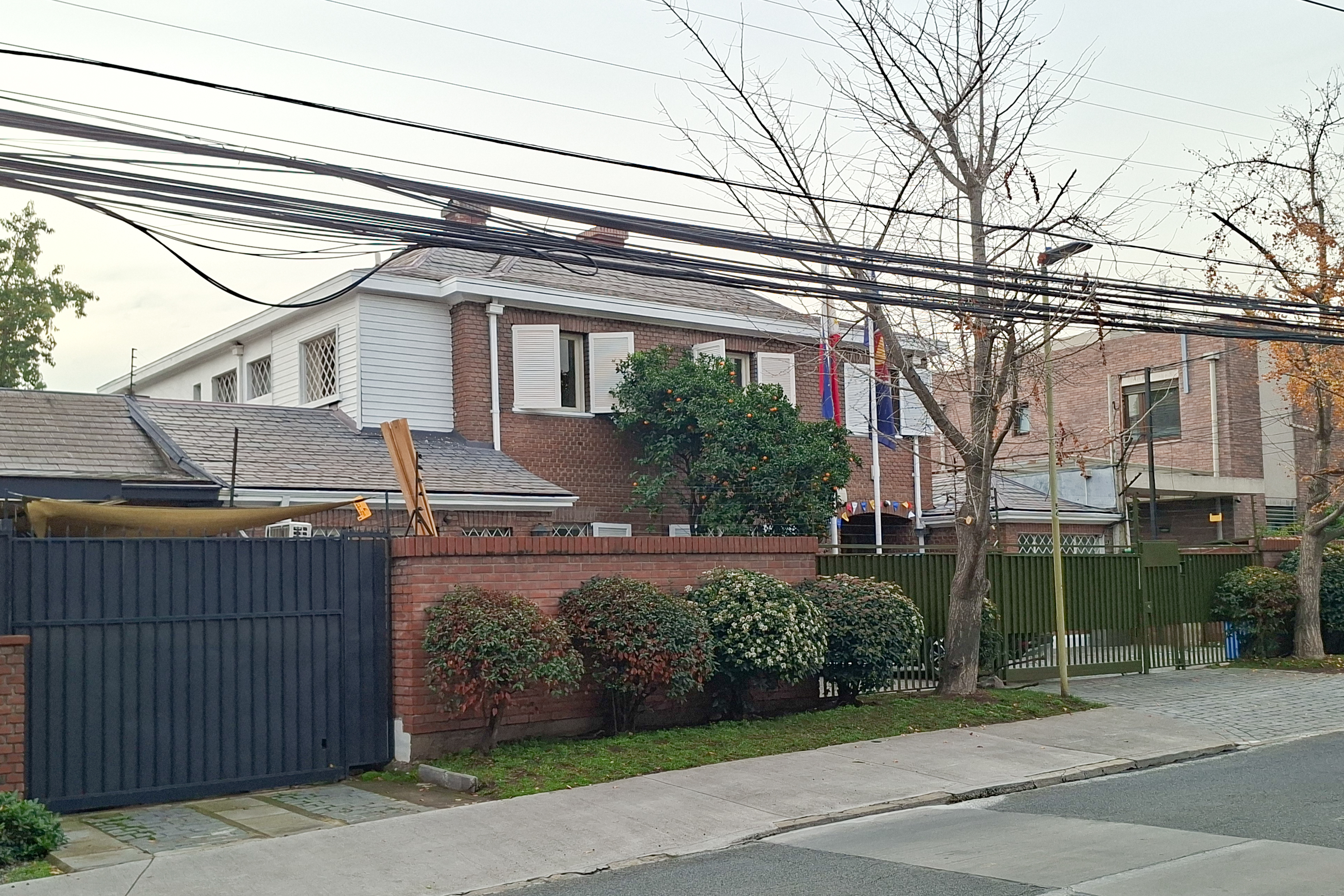
- Location: Santiago
- Address: Calle del Inca 4622, Las Condes, Santiago Province
- Coordinates: 33°25′0.5″S 70°34′45.7″W
- Ambassador: Celeste S. Vinzon-Balatbat
- Website: santiagope.dfa.gov.ph

The Embassy of the Philippines in Santiago is the diplomatic mission of the Republic of the Philippines to the Republic of Chile. Opened in 1981, it is located northeast of Santiago proper in the city of Las Condes, Santiago Province.

== History ==
The Philippines did not initially open a resident mission in Chile when diplomatic relations between the two countries were established in 1947 — the first Southeast Asian country to do so. While Chile opened its embassy in Manila in December 1967, the Philippine Embassy in Buenos Aires initially represented the Philippines in Chile, with Ambassador Luis Moreno Salcedo being accredited to Chile on March 23, 1963.

A resident Philippine embassy in Santiago was opened in 1981, during the presidency of Ferdinand Marcos, when Rodolfo A. Arizala was appointed the Philippines' first resident ambassador to Chile. Notably, when Arizala arrived in Santiago on August 21, 1981 to assume his post, he was initially billeted at the Hotel Carrera by the central Plaza de la Constitución, which today houses the offices of Chile's Ministry of Foreign Affairs, while scouting locations for the chancery and ambassadorial residence. The hotel manager, a retired general who in his youth had played basketball against Ambrosio Padilla during the 1936 Summer Olympics as part of its men's basketball team and who had since befriended him, offered the hotel as his residence for the duration of his tenure at a significant discount.

In 2016, a number of groups led by the Fundación Daya organized a protest outside the embassy against the policies of President Rodrigo Duterte and the Philippine drug war, which they also organized again the following year as part of a worldwide campaign to reform global drug policy.

== Chancery ==
The chancery of the Philippine Embassy in Santiago was originally located at Calle Félix de Amesti 367 in Las Condes. On March 18, 2025, it announced that it was relocating to a new chancery on Calle del Inca 220 meters (720 ft) away, with operations at the new location commencing on March 26, 2025.

== Staff and activities ==
The Philippine Embassy in Santiago is currently headed by Ambassador Celeste S. Vinzon-Balatbat, who was appointed to the position by President Bongbong Marcos on November 2, 2022. Prior to her appointment as ambassador, Balatbat, a career diplomat, served as consul general at the Philippine Consulate General in Nagoya. Her appointment was confirmed by the Commission on Appointments on December 7, 2022, and she presented her credentials to Chilean President Gabriel Boric on April 25, 2023. The Santiago mission is one of the Philippines' smaller diplomatic missions, with only seven staff members.

Many of the embassy's activities center around promoting Filipino interests and strengthening cultural and economic ties between the Philippines and Chile, particularly considering the country's relatively small number of resident Filipinos. These include donating books on Philippine history and culture to a number of local libraries, organizing cultural exhibits and lectures on José Rizal at the University of Santiago, Chile, and promoting the Philippines as a tourist destination for Chileans. However, while it does conduct outreach to the local community, results can be mixed: it was reported that no Filipinos in Chile voted in the 2016 general election in the first week of voting, although bad weather may have played a role.

In addition to activities in Chile, the embassy exercises jurisdiction over Peru, where it has conducted outreach activities to provide consular services to Filipinos based in the country. It also previously exercised jurisdiction over Ecuador until 2024, with the opening of the Philippine Embassy in Bogotá.

== See also ==
- Chile–Philippines relations
- List of diplomatic missions of the Philippines
