= List of diplomatic missions of the Philippines =

Countries hosting diplomatic missions of the Philippines

The Republic of the Philippines has a network of diplomatic missions in major cities around the world, under the purview of the Department of Foreign Affairs (DFA), to forward the country's interests in the areas that they serve, as well as to serve the ever-growing numbers of Overseas Filipinos and Overseas Filipino Workers.

Although the Philippine diplomatic mission network is wide, there are embassies that are accredited to other nations without Philippine diplomatic posts. The network as of February 2026 consists of 68 embassies, 30 consulates-general, 4 permanent missions to international organizations, and the Manila Economic and Cultural Office (MECO) in Taipei, and its 2 extension offices.

Excluded from this listing are honorary consulates, branches of the Sentro Rizal, overseas offices of the Department of Tourism and the Department of Migrant Workers, and trade missions (with the exception of MECO, which serves as the country's de facto embassy to Taiwan).

== History ==
Although attempts at initial diplomatic relations were made during the Philippine Revolution and the time of the First Philippine Republic, most nations established diplomatic relations with the Philippines only in the years after the country achieved independence from the United States in 1946.

The first documented instance of a Philippine diplomatic mission being established abroad was that of the embassy in Tokyo, which was opened by the Second Philippine Republic, a puppet state of the Empire of Japan, on 24 March 1944, with Jorge B. Vargas as its first ambassador. However, the mission was summarily closed with Japan's defeat in World War II, and as it was never recognized by the pre-war Commonwealth of the Philippines, the oldest continually-operating Philippine diplomatic mission is that of the embassy in Washington, D.C., replacing the office of the Resident Commissioner of the Philippines after the country achieved independence from the United States on 4 July 1946, and led by Joaquín Miguel Elizalde as its first ambassador. This was followed shortly thereafter with the establishment of the permanent mission to the United Nations.

A number of missions were opened in the first years after independence. In his 1947 State of the Nation Address (SONA), President Manuel Roxas announced that missions in a number of other cities were also opened aside from the embassy in Washington, D.C.; these included the first consulates general in New York City, San Francisco, and Honolulu, as well as consulates in Xiamen and Hong Kong. Additional missions were opened the following year, including the first missions in Europe (in London, Madrid and Rome) and Latin America (in Buenos Aires). By 1952, the Philippine foreign service had grown to encompass missions in 11 countries, and by 1965 grew further to missions in 36 countries worldwide.

The Philippines' diplomatic presence grew significantly during the presidency of Ferdinand Marcos, spurred in part by the normalization of relations with the Eastern Bloc in the early 1970s. Philippine diplomatic missions were present in 43 countries by 1978, with additional ones opening the following year, particularly in the Middle East. By 1981, there were 63 countries worldwide hosting Philippine diplomatic missions. Several missions, however, would be closed at the tail end of the Marcos presidency and in the years thereafter as part of a series of cost reduction programs.

Another expansion of the country's diplomatic presence took place during the presidency of Gloria Macapagal Arroyo, with 67 countries hosting Philippine diplomatic missions by the end of her presidency. This, however, was not without controversy: in 2010 Senator Franklin Drilon questioned the need for embassies in countries with small Filipino communities, calling for a review of the Philippines' diplomatic presence worldwide. Arroyo's successor, Benigno Aquino III, then announced two years later the closure of ten posts (seven embassies and three consulates general): Caracas, Venezuela; Koror, Palau; Dublin, Ireland; Stockholm, Sweden; Bucharest, Romania; Havana, Cuba; Helsinki, Finland; Barcelona, Spain; Frankfurt, Germany and Saipan, Northern Mariana Islands. These closures have since been largely reversed under Aquino's successors, Rodrigo Duterte and Bongbong Marcos, with the 2019 reopening of the consulate general in Frankfurt, the 2020 reopening of the consulate general in Barcelona, and shortly thereafter the reopening of the embassy in Sweden. In 2024, the embassies in Finland, Ireland and Romania reopened after funding was approved by Congress, alongside the future reopening of the embassy in Cuba. Even missions closed years earlier were reopened, such as the 2018 reopening of the consulate general in Houston 25 years after it was last closed.

Aquino's successors have generally returned to an expansion of the Philippines' diplomatic presence abroad, including the opening of new missions where they did not exist previously. Under Duterte, the Philippines opened its embassy in Copenhagen, Denmark on 14 January 2019, the first new embassy to open since 2012, while the first new consulate to open since 2012 opened in Istanbul, Turkey on 2 January 2020. Under Bongbong Marcos, the first new mission to open during his presidency was the embassy in Bogotá, Colombia, which opened on 7 October 2024, while the first new consulate was opened in Busan, South Korea on 26 January 2026.

Other missions likely to be opened include new embassies in Ethiopia, Ghana, Kazakhstan, Panama, and Ukraine, the reopening of embassies in Palau and Peru, and new consulates in Ho Chi Minh City and Miami.

== Current missions ==
=== Africa ===
Host country	Host city	Mission	Head of mission	Concurrent accreditation	Ref.
Egypt	Cairo	Embassy	Charmaine Rowena C. Aviquivil	Countries: Djibouti; Eritrea; Sudan	
Kenya	Nairobi	Embassy	Marie Charlotte G. Tang	Countries: Burundi; Comoros; Congo-Brazzaville; Congo-Kinshasa; Ethiopia; Malawi; Rwanda; Seychelles; Somalia; South Sudan; Tanzania; Uganda; Multilateral Organizations: United Nations; United Nations Environment Programme; United Nations Human Settlements Programme	
Libya	Tripoli	Embassy	Roderico C. Atienza; Chargé d'Affaires, e.p.	Countries: Algeria; Chad; Niger; Tunisia	
Morocco	Rabat	Embassy	Leslie J. Baja	Countries: Guinea; Mali; Mauritania; Senegal	
Nigeria	Abuja	Embassy	Mersole J. Mellejor	Countries: Benin; Burkina Faso; Cameroon; Central African Republic; Equatorial Guinea; Gabon; Gambia; Ghana; Ivory Coast; Liberia; Sierra Leone; Togo	
South Africa	Pretoria	Embassy	Myla Grace Ragenia C. Macahilig	Countries: Botswana; Eswatini; Lesotho; Madagascar; Mauritius; Mozambique; Namibia; Zambia; Zimbabwe	

=== Americas ===
Host country	Host city	Mission	Head of mission	Concurrent accreditation	Ref.
Argentina	Buenos Aires	Embassy	Grace T. Cruz-Fabella	Countries: Bolivia; Paraguay; Uruguay	
Brazil	Brasília	Embassy	Patrick John U. Hilado	Countries: Guyana; Suriname	
Canada	Ottawa	Embassy	Jose Victor V. Chan-Gonzaga	Multilateral Organizations: International Civil Aviation Organization (ICAO)	
Canada	Calgary	Consulate-General	Emma R. Sarne	Multilateral Organizations: International Civil Aviation Organization (ICAO)	
Canada	Toronto	Consulate-General	Kristine Leilani R. Salle	Multilateral Organizations: International Civil Aviation Organization (ICAO)	
Canada	Vancouver	Consulate-General	Gina A. Jamoralin	Multilateral Organizations: International Civil Aviation Organization (ICAO)	
Chile	Santiago de Chile	Embassy	Celeste S. Vinzon-Balatbat	Countries: Peru	
Colombia	Bogotá	Embassy	Adrian Bernie C. Candolada	Countries: Ecuador; Venezuela	
Mexico	Mexico City	Embassy	Arvin R. de León	Countries: Belize; Costa Rica; Cuba; Dominican Republic; El Salvador; Guatemala; Honduras; Nicaragua; Panama	
United States	Washington, D.C.	Embassy	Jose Manuel G. Romualdez	Countries: Antigua and Barbuda; Bahamas; Barbados; Dominica; Grenada; Haiti; Jamaica; Saint Kitts and Nevis; Saint Lucia; Saint Vincent and the Grenadines; Trinidad and Tobago; Consular jurisdiction only: (Note: The following three countries are under the jurisdiction of the Philippine Consulate General in Hagåtña for consular matters only. Formal diplomatic relations are conducted through the Philippine Embassy in Tokyo.); Marshall Islands; Micronesia; Palau; Multilateral Organizations: Organization of American States (Note: Accredited as an observer mission.)	
United States	Chicago	Consulate-General	Melanie Rita B. Diano	Countries: Antigua and Barbuda; Bahamas; Barbados; Dominica; Grenada; Haiti; Jamaica; Saint Kitts and Nevis; Saint Lucia; Saint Vincent and the Grenadines; Trinidad and Tobago; Consular jurisdiction only: Marshall Islands; Micronesia; Palau; Multilateral Organizations: Organization of American States	
United States	Hagåtña, Guam (Note: Located in the adjacent village of Tamuning.)	Consulate-General	Rosario P. Lemque	Countries: Antigua and Barbuda; Bahamas; Barbados; Dominica; Grenada; Haiti; Jamaica; Saint Kitts and Nevis; Saint Lucia; Saint Vincent and the Grenadines; Trinidad and Tobago; Consular jurisdiction only: Marshall Islands; Micronesia; Palau; Multilateral Organizations: Organization of American States	
United States	Honolulu	Consulate-General	Arman R. Talbo	Countries: Antigua and Barbuda; Bahamas; Barbados; Dominica; Grenada; Haiti; Jamaica; Saint Kitts and Nevis; Saint Lucia; Saint Vincent and the Grenadines; Trinidad and Tobago; Consular jurisdiction only: Marshall Islands; Micronesia; Palau; Multilateral Organizations: Organization of American States	
United States	Houston	Consulate-General	Gunther Emil M. Sales	Countries: Antigua and Barbuda; Bahamas; Barbados; Dominica; Grenada; Haiti; Jamaica; Saint Kitts and Nevis; Saint Lucia; Saint Vincent and the Grenadines; Trinidad and Tobago; Consular jurisdiction only: Marshall Islands; Micronesia; Palau; Multilateral Organizations: Organization of American States	
United States	Los Angeles	Consulate-General	Adelio Angelito S. Cruz	Countries: Antigua and Barbuda; Bahamas; Barbados; Dominica; Grenada; Haiti; Jamaica; Saint Kitts and Nevis; Saint Lucia; Saint Vincent and the Grenadines; Trinidad and Tobago; Consular jurisdiction only: Marshall Islands; Micronesia; Palau; Multilateral Organizations: Organization of American States	
United States	New York City	Consulate-General	Juan Carlos C. Borromeo; Acting Head of Post	Countries: Antigua and Barbuda; Bahamas; Barbados; Dominica; Grenada; Haiti; Jamaica; Saint Kitts and Nevis; Saint Lucia; Saint Vincent and the Grenadines; Trinidad and Tobago; Consular jurisdiction only: Marshall Islands; Micronesia; Palau; Multilateral Organizations: Organization of American States	
United States	San Francisco	Consulate-General	Arnel G. Talisayon	Countries: Antigua and Barbuda; Bahamas; Barbados; Dominica; Grenada; Haiti; Jamaica; Saint Kitts and Nevis; Saint Lucia; Saint Vincent and the Grenadines; Trinidad and Tobago; Consular jurisdiction only: Marshall Islands; Micronesia; Palau; Multilateral Organizations: Organization of American States	
United States	Seattle	Consulate-General	Henry S. Bensurto Jr.	Countries: Antigua and Barbuda; Bahamas; Barbados; Dominica; Grenada; Haiti; Jamaica; Saint Kitts and Nevis; Saint Lucia; Saint Vincent and the Grenadines; Trinidad and Tobago; Consular jurisdiction only: Marshall Islands; Micronesia; Palau; Multilateral Organizations: Organization of American States	

=== Asia ===
Host country	Host city	Mission	Head of mission	Concurrent accreditation	Ref.
Bahrain	Manama	Embassy	Gines Jaime Ricardo D. Gallaga		
Bangladesh	Dhaka	Embassy	Nina P. Cainglet	Countries: Maldives; Sri Lanka	
Brunei	Bandar Seri Begawan	Embassy	Bernadette A. Mendoza; Chargée d'Affaires, a.i.		
Cambodia	Phnom Penh	Embassy	Senen T. Mangalile		
China	Beijing	Embassy	Jaime A. FlorCruz	Countries: Mongolia; North Korea	
China	Chongqing	Consulate-General	Ivan Frank M. Olea	Countries: Mongolia; North Korea	
China	Guangzhou	Consulate-General	Iric C. Arribas	Countries: Mongolia; North Korea	
China	Hong Kong	Consulate-General	Romulo Victor M. Israel, Jr.	Countries: Mongolia; North Korea	
China	Macau	Consulate-General	Edna May Grecia Lazaro	Countries: Mongolia; North Korea	
China	Shanghai	Consulate-General	Myca Magnolia M. Fischer	Countries: Mongolia; North Korea	
China	Xiamen	Consulate-General	Winston Dean S. Almeda	Countries: Mongolia; North Korea	
India	New Delhi	Embassy	Josel F. Ignacio	Countries: Bhutan; Nepal	
Indonesia	Jakarta	Embassy	Christopher Baltazar Montero		
Indonesia	Manado	Consulate-General	Mary Jennifer Domingo Dingal		
Iran	Tehran	Embassy	Roberto G. Manalo	Countries: Kyrgyzstan; Tajikistan; Turkmenistan; Uzbekistan	
Iraq	Baghdad	Embassy	Charlie P. Manangan		
Israel	Tel Aviv	Embassy	Aileen S. Mendiola		
Japan	Tokyo	Embassy	Mylene J. Garcia-Albano	Countries: Marshall Islands; Micronesia; Palau	
Japan	Nagoya	Consulate-General	Shirlene C. Mananquil	Countries: Marshall Islands; Micronesia; Palau	
Japan	Osaka	Consulate-General	Donna M. Rodriguez	Countries: Marshall Islands; Micronesia; Palau	
Jordan	Amman	Embassy	Wilfredo C. Santos	Countries: Palestine	
Kuwait	Kuwait City	Embassy	Jose A. Cabrera III		
Laos	Vientiane	Embassy	Elizabeth T. Te		
Lebanon	Beirut	Embassy	Marlowe A. Miranda		
Malaysia	Kuala Lumpur	Embassy	Maria Angela A. Ponce		
Myanmar	Yangon	Embassy	Angelito A. Nayan; Chargé d'Affaires, a.i.		
Oman	Muscat	Embassy	Noralyn J. Baja		
Pakistan	Islamabad	Embassy	Maria Agnes M. Cervantes	Countries: Afghanistan	
Qatar	Doha	Embassy	Mardomel Celo D. Melicor		
Saudi Arabia	Riyadh	Embassy	Raymond R. Balatbat	Countries: Yemen	
Saudi Arabia	Jeddah	Consulate-General	Rommel A. Romato	Countries: Yemen	
Singapore	Singapore	Embassy	Medardo G. Macaraig		
South Korea	Seoul	Embassy	Bernadette Therese C. Fernandez		
South Korea	Busan	Consulate-General	Leah Victoria T. Carada		
Syria	Damascus	Embassy	Ferdinand P. Flores; Chargé d'Affaires, e.p.		
Taiwan (Note: The Philippines does not have formal relations with Taiwan, since the establishment of relations with the People's Republic of China in 1975. Nonetheless, its economic and cultural office in Taipei - along with its extension offices in Taichung and Kaohsiung - functions as a de facto embassy.)	Taipei	Economic & Cultural Office	Corazon A. Padiernos; Chairperson & Resident Representative		
Taiwan	Kaohsiung	Extension office	Corazon A. Padiernos; Chairperson & Resident Representative		
Taiwan	Taichung	Extension office	Corazon A. Padiernos; Chairperson & Resident Representative		
Thailand	Bangkok	Embassy	Millicent Cruz-Paredes		
Timor-Leste	Dili	Embassy	Mary Anne A. Padua		
Turkey	Ankara	Embassy	Jaime Ramon T. Ascalon	Countries: Azerbaijan; Georgia	
Turkey	Istanbul	Consulate-General	Christina Gracia V. Rola-McKernan	Countries: Azerbaijan; Georgia	
United Arab Emirates	Abu Dhabi	Embassy	Alfonso A. Ver	Multilateral Organizations: International Renewable Energy Agency	
United Arab Emirates	Dubai	Consulate-General	Ambrosio Brian F. Enciso III	Multilateral Organizations: International Renewable Energy Agency	
Vietnam	Hanoi	Embassy	Francisco Noel R. Fernandez III		
Vietnam	Ho Chi Minh City	Consulate-General	Querobine D. Laccay		

=== Europe ===
Host country	Host city	Mission	Head of mission	Concurrent accreditation	Ref.
Austria	Vienna	Embassy	Evangelina Lourdes A. Bernas	Countries: Croatia; Slovakia; Slovenia; Multilateral Organizations: International Atomic Energy Agency (IAEA); United Nations; United Nations Industrial Development Organization (UNIDO); United Nations Office on Drugs and Crime (UNODC)	
Belgium	Brussels	Embassy	Jaime Victor B. Ledda	Countries: Luxembourg; Multilateral Organizations: European Union	
Czech Republic	Prague	Embassy	Eduardo Martin R. Meñez		
Denmark	Copenhagen	Embassy	Pablito A. Mendoza		
Finland	Helsinki	Embassy	Domingo P. Nolasco	Countries: Estonia	
France	Paris	Embassy	Eduardo Jose A. de Vega	Countries: Monaco; Multilateral Organizations: UNESCO	
Germany	Berlin	Embassy	Maria Teresa T. Almojuela		
Germany	Frankfurt	Consulate-General	Marie Yvette L. Banzon-Abalos		
Greece	Athens	Embassy	Giovanni E. Palec	Countries: Cyprus; North Macedonia	
Holy See (Note: The Philippine Embassy to the Holy See is located outside Vatican territory in Rome.)	Rome	Embassy	Raphael Perpetuo M. Lotilla	Sovereign entity: Sovereign Military Order of Malta	
Hungary	Budapest	Embassy	Maria Elena P. Algabre	Countries: Bosnia and Herzegovina; Montenegro; Serbia	
Ireland	Dublin	Embassy	Daniel R. Espiritu		
Italy	Rome	Embassy	Nathaniel G. Imperial	Countries: Albania; Malta; San Marino; Multilateral Organizations: Food and Agriculture Organization; International Fund for Agricultural Development; World Food Programme	
Italy	Milan	Consulate-General	Jim Tito B. San Agustin	Countries: Albania; Malta; San Marino; Multilateral Organizations: Food and Agriculture Organization; International Fund for Agricultural Development; World Food Programme	
Netherlands	The Hague	Embassy	J. Eduardo E. Malaya III	Multilateral Organizations: Organisation for the Prohibition of Chemical Weapons	
Norway	Oslo	Embassy	Enrico T. Fos	Countries: Iceland	
Poland	Warsaw	Embassy	Alan L. Deniega	Countries: Lithuania; Ukraine	
Portugal	Lisbon	Embassy	Paul Raymund P. Cortes	Countries: Angola; Cape Verde; Guinea-Bissau; São Tomé and Príncipe	
Romania	Bucharest	Embassy	Noel Eugene Eusebio M. Servigon	Countries: Bulgaria; Moldova	
Russia	Moscow	Embassy	Igor G. Bailen	Countries: Armenia; Belarus; Kazakhstan	
Spain	Madrid	Embassy	Philippe J. Lhuillier	Countries: Andorra; Multilateral Organizations: UN Tourism	
Spain	Barcelona	Consulate-General	Ma. Therese S.M. Lázaro	Countries: Andorra; Multilateral Organizations: UN Tourism	
Sweden	Stockholm	Embassy	Patrick A. Chuasoto	Countries: Latvia	
Switzerland	Bern	Embassy	Bernard F. Dy	Countries: Liechtenstein	
Switzerland	Geneva	Consulate-General	Andrea B. Leycano; Acting Head of Post	Countries: Liechtenstein	
United Kingdom	London	Embassy	Teodoro L. Locsin Jr.	International Organizations: International Maritime Organization	

=== Oceania ===
Host country	Host city	Mission	Head of mission	Concurrent accreditation	Ref.
Australia	Canberra	Embassy	Antonio A. Morales		
Australia	Melbourne	Consulate-General	Jesus S. Domingo		
Australia	Sydney	Consulate-General	Greg Marie C. Mariño		
Fiji	Suva	Embassy	Noel M. Novicio	Countries: Kiribati; Nauru; Samoa; Tonga; Tuvalu; Vanuatu; Consular jurisdiction only: French Polynesia; Wallis and Futuna	
New Zealand	Wellington	Embassy	Kira Christianne D. Azucena	Countries: Cook Islands; Niue; Oversight only: Tokelau	
Papua New Guinea	Port Moresby	Embassy	Edgar Tomas Q. Auxilian	Countries: Solomon Islands	

=== Multilateral organizations ===
Organization	Host city	Host country	Mission	Head of mission	Concurrent accreditation	Ref.
Association of Southeast Asian Nations	Jakarta	Indonesia	Permanent Mission	Evangeline T. Ong Jimenez-Ducrocq		
United Nations	New York City	United States	Permanent Mission	Enrique Manalo	International Organizations: International Seabed Authority	
United Nations	Geneva	Switzerland	Permanent Mission	Carlos D. Sorreta		
World Trade Organization	Geneva	Switzerland	Permanent Mission	Manuel Antonio J. Teehankee		

== Gallery ==
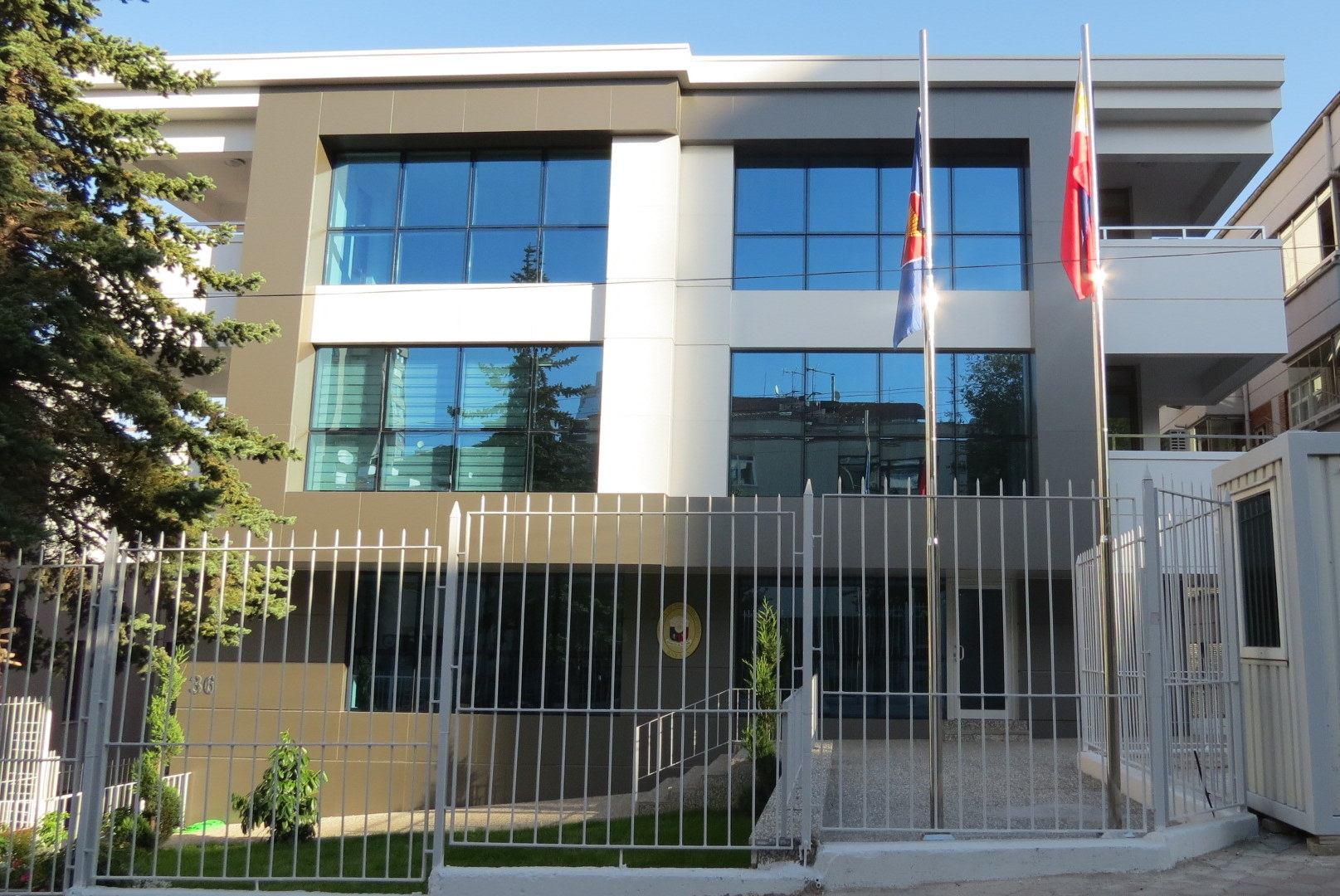
Embassy in Ankara

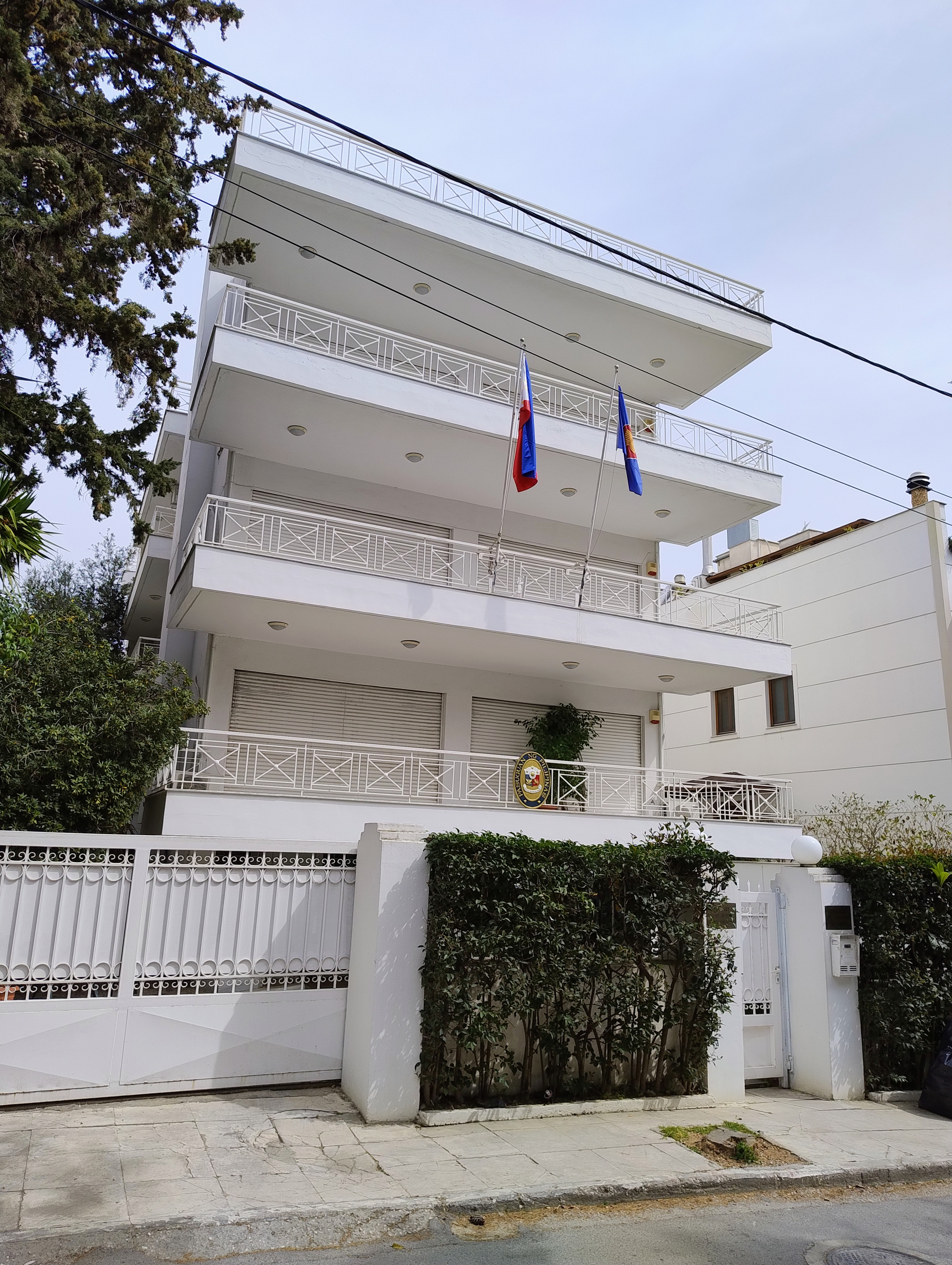
Embassy in Athens

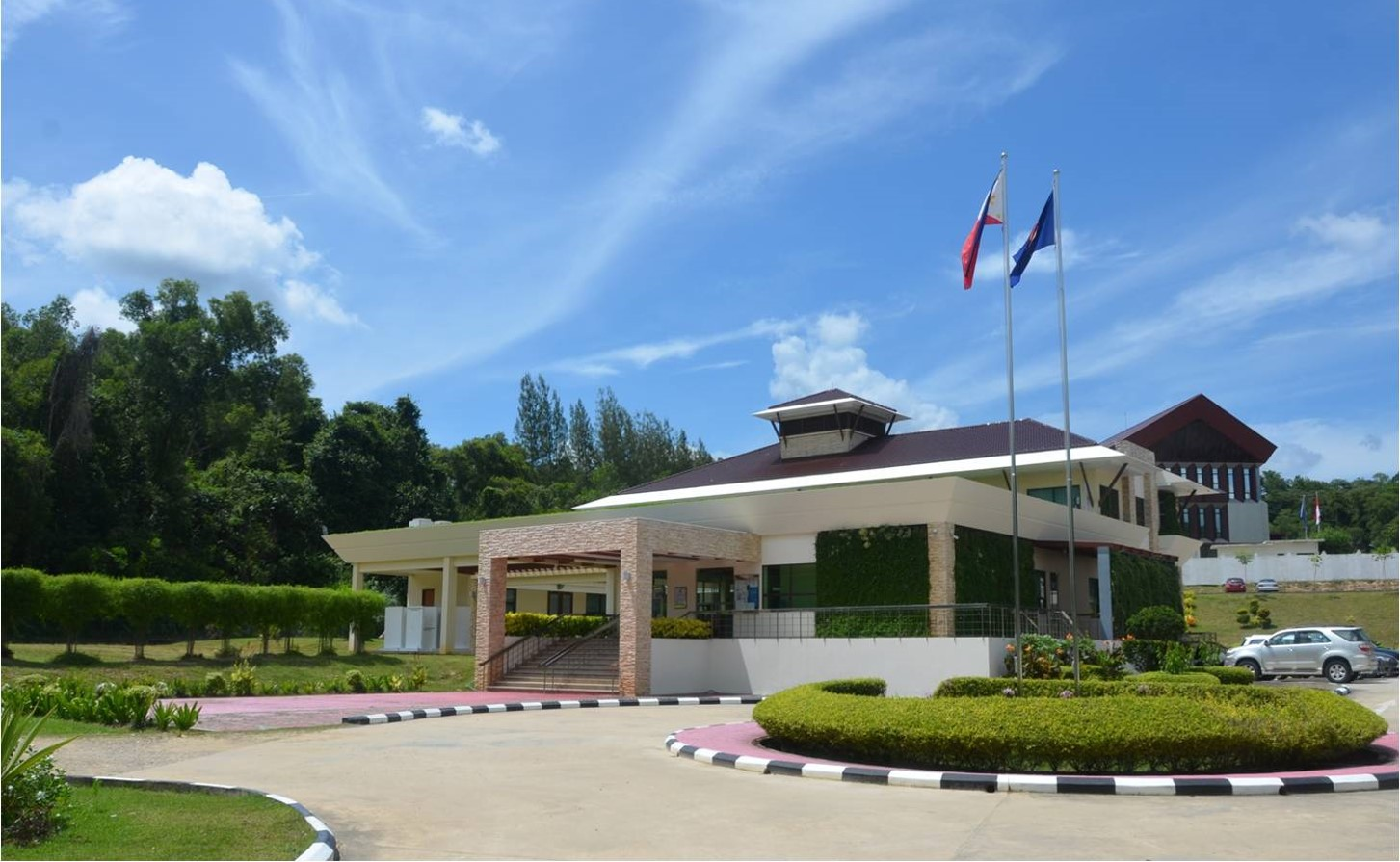
Embassy in Bandar Seri Begawan

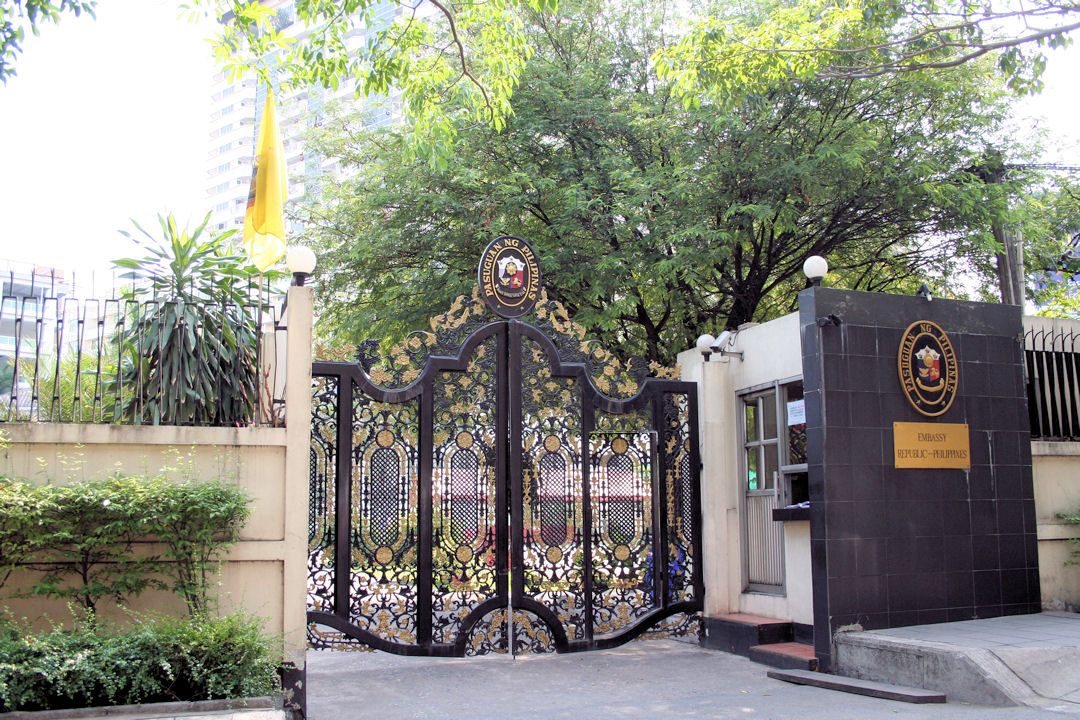
Embassy in Bangkok

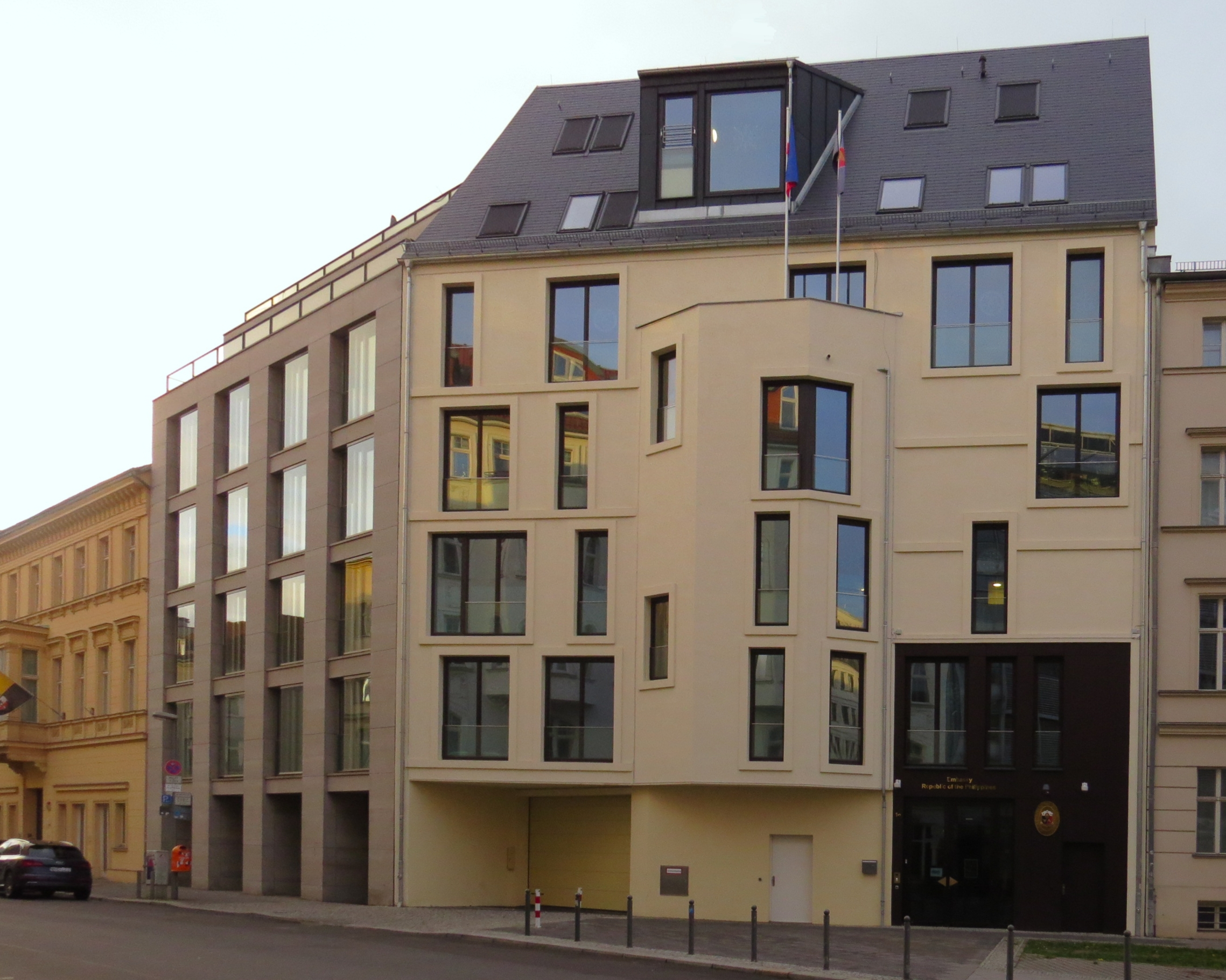
Embassy in Berlin

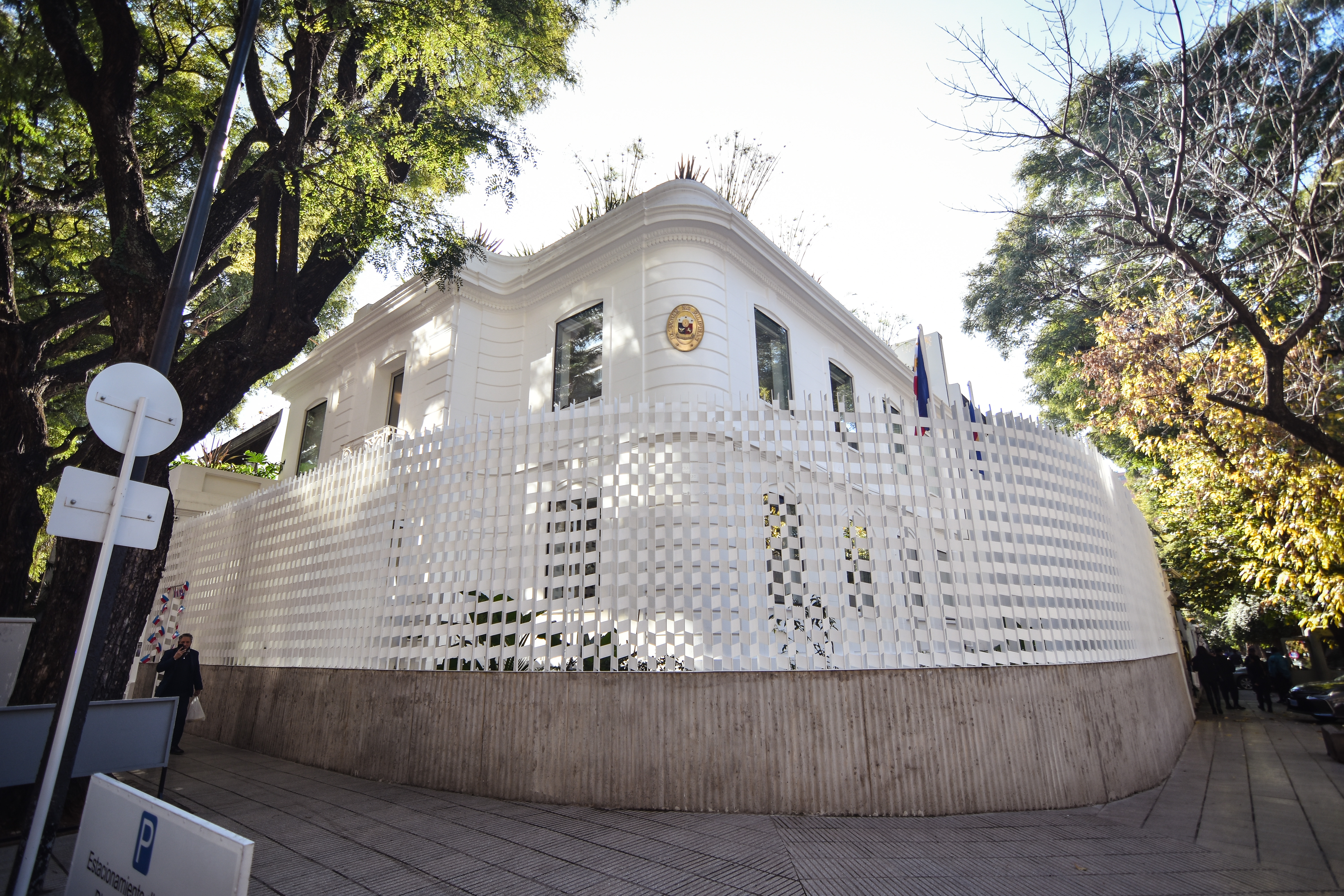
Embassy in Buenos Aires

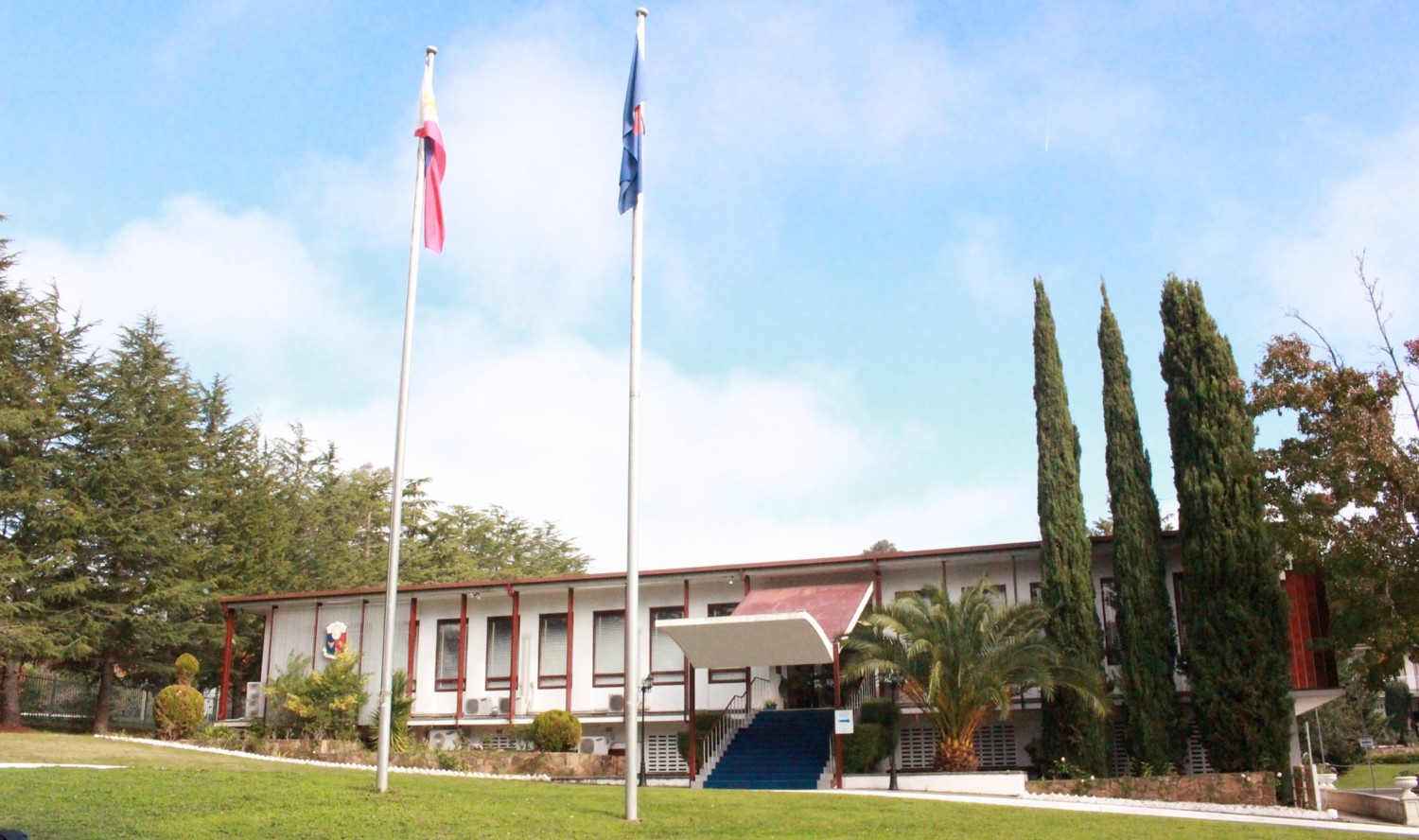
Embassy in Canberra

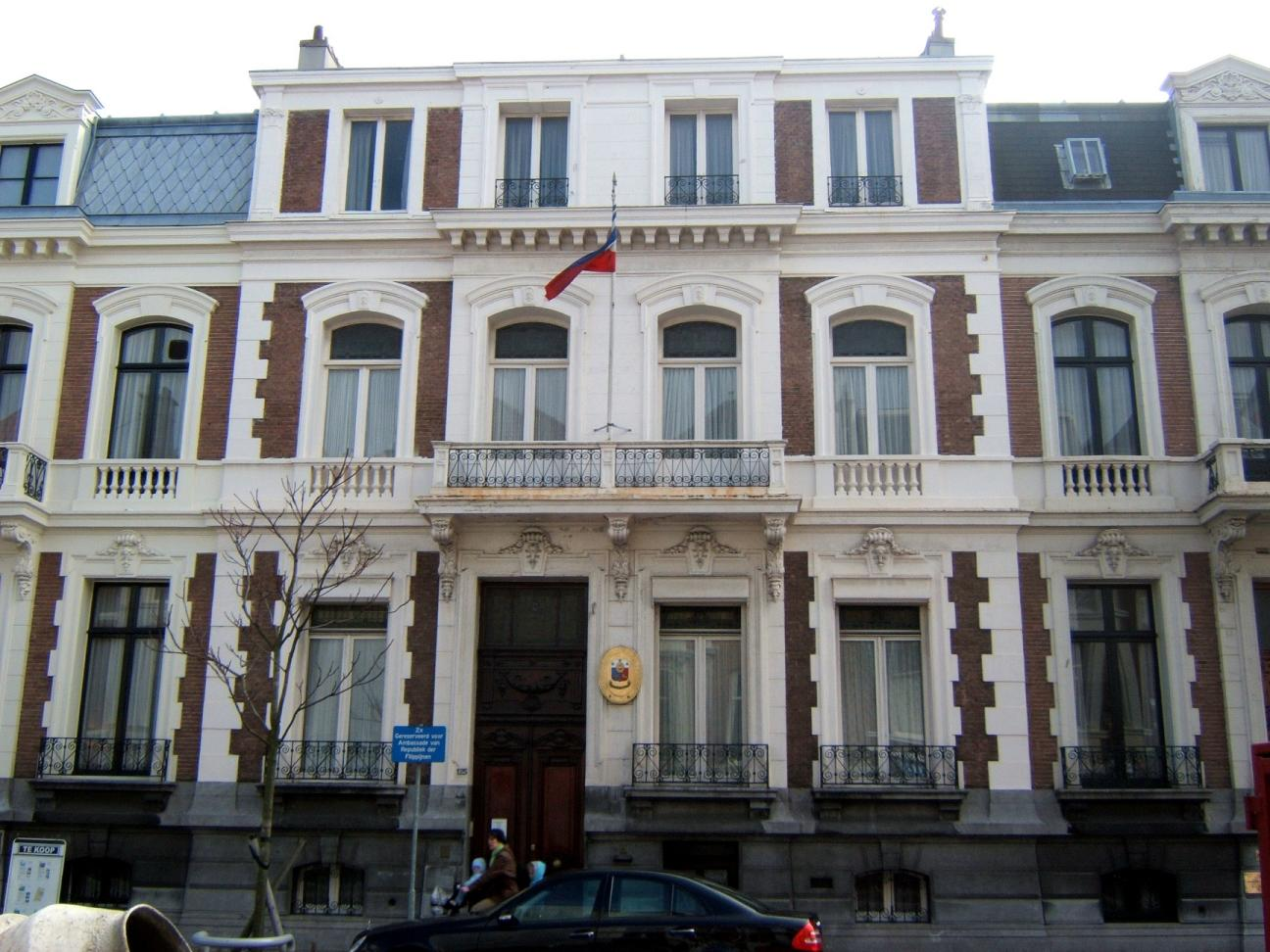
Embassy in The Hague

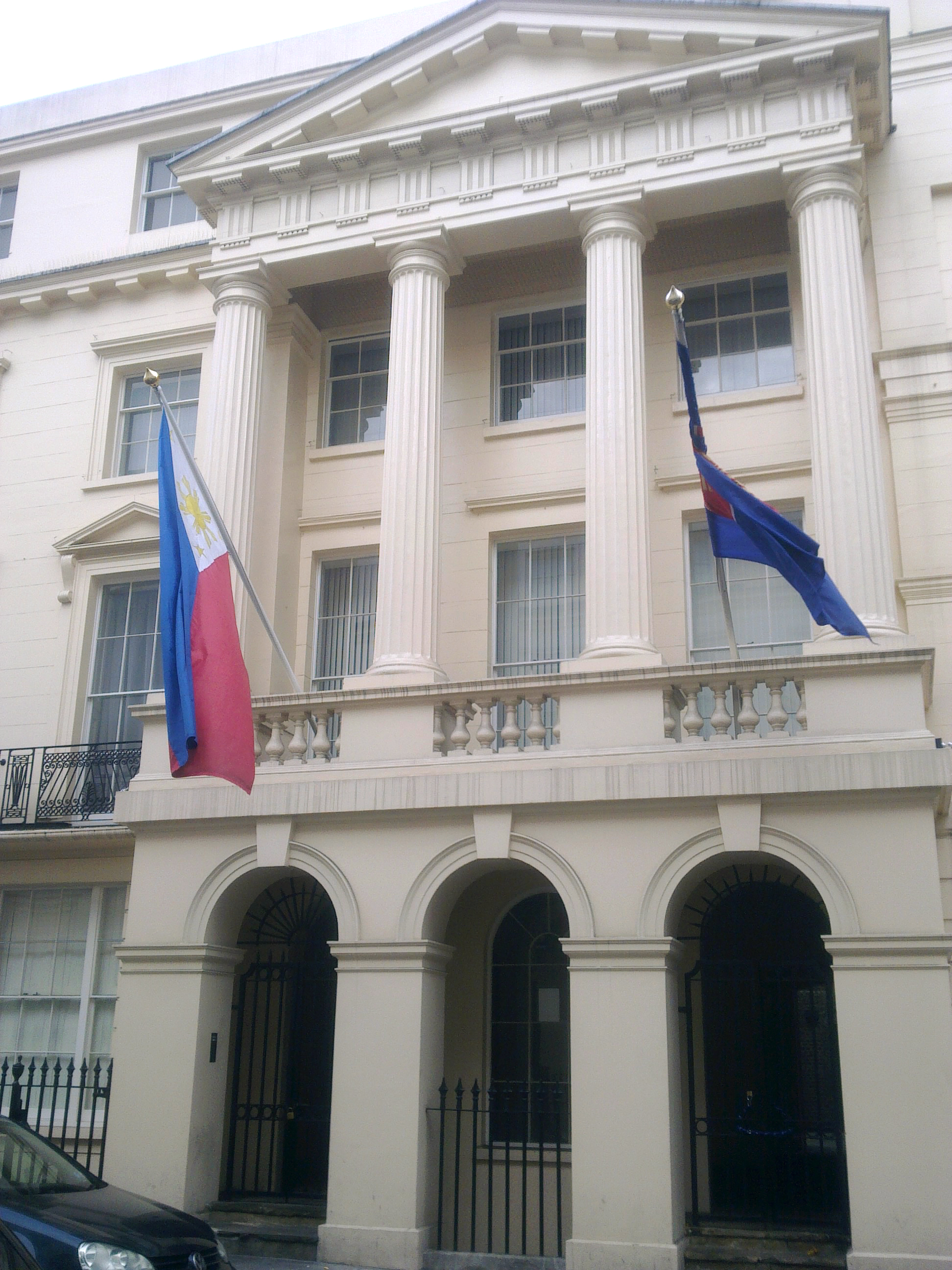
Embassy in London

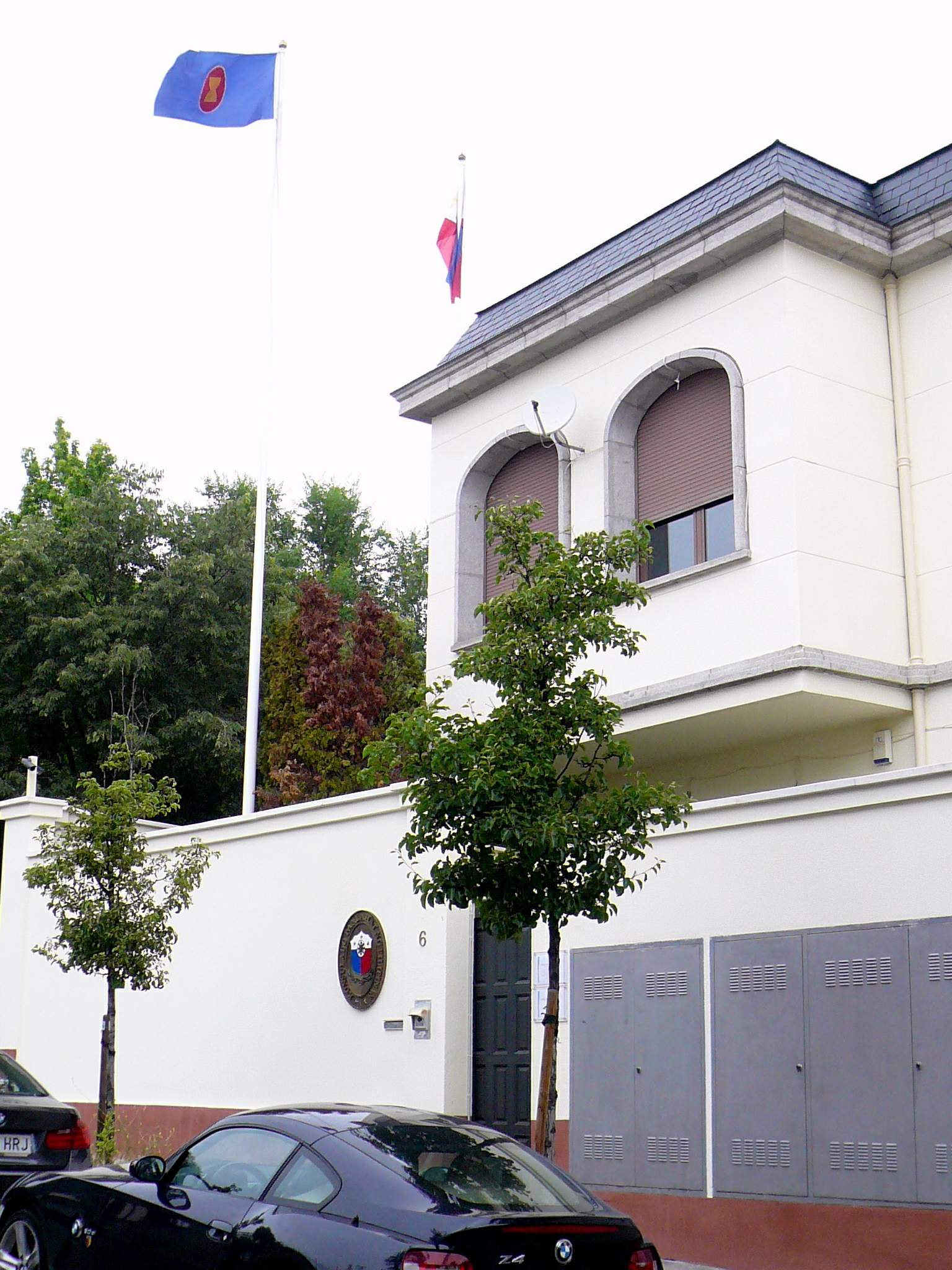
Embassy in Madrid

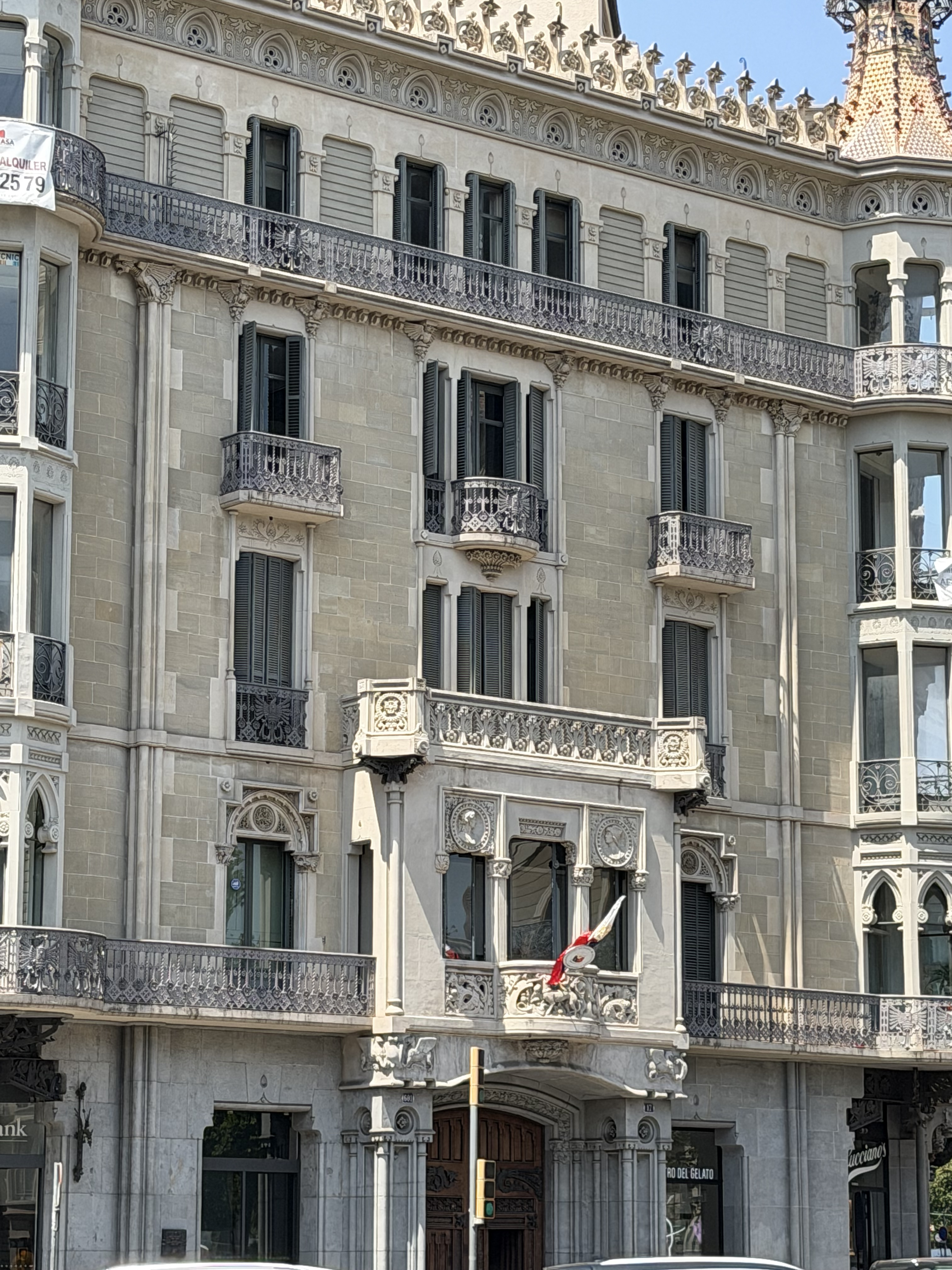
Consulate-General in Barcelona

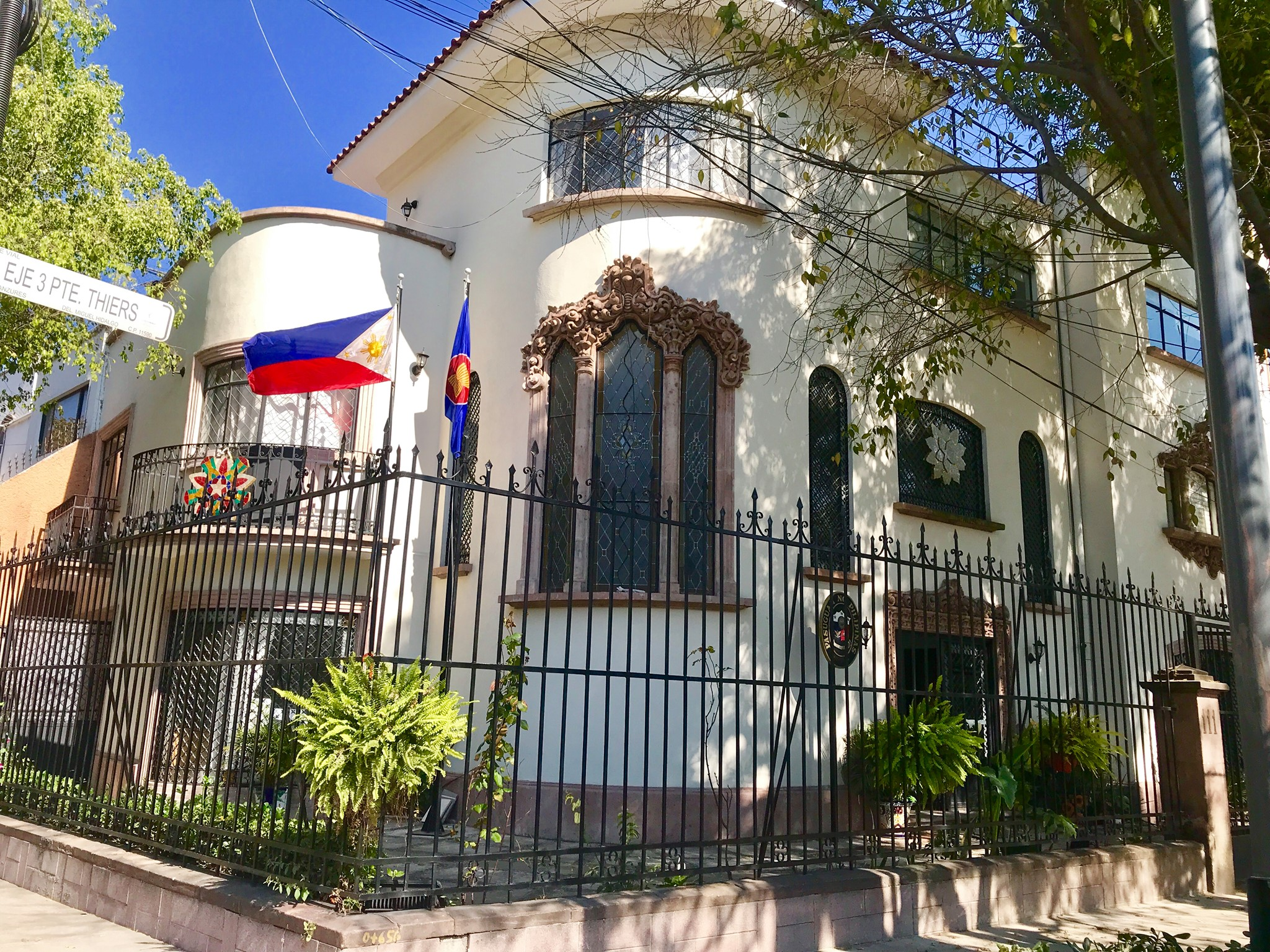
Embassy in Mexico City

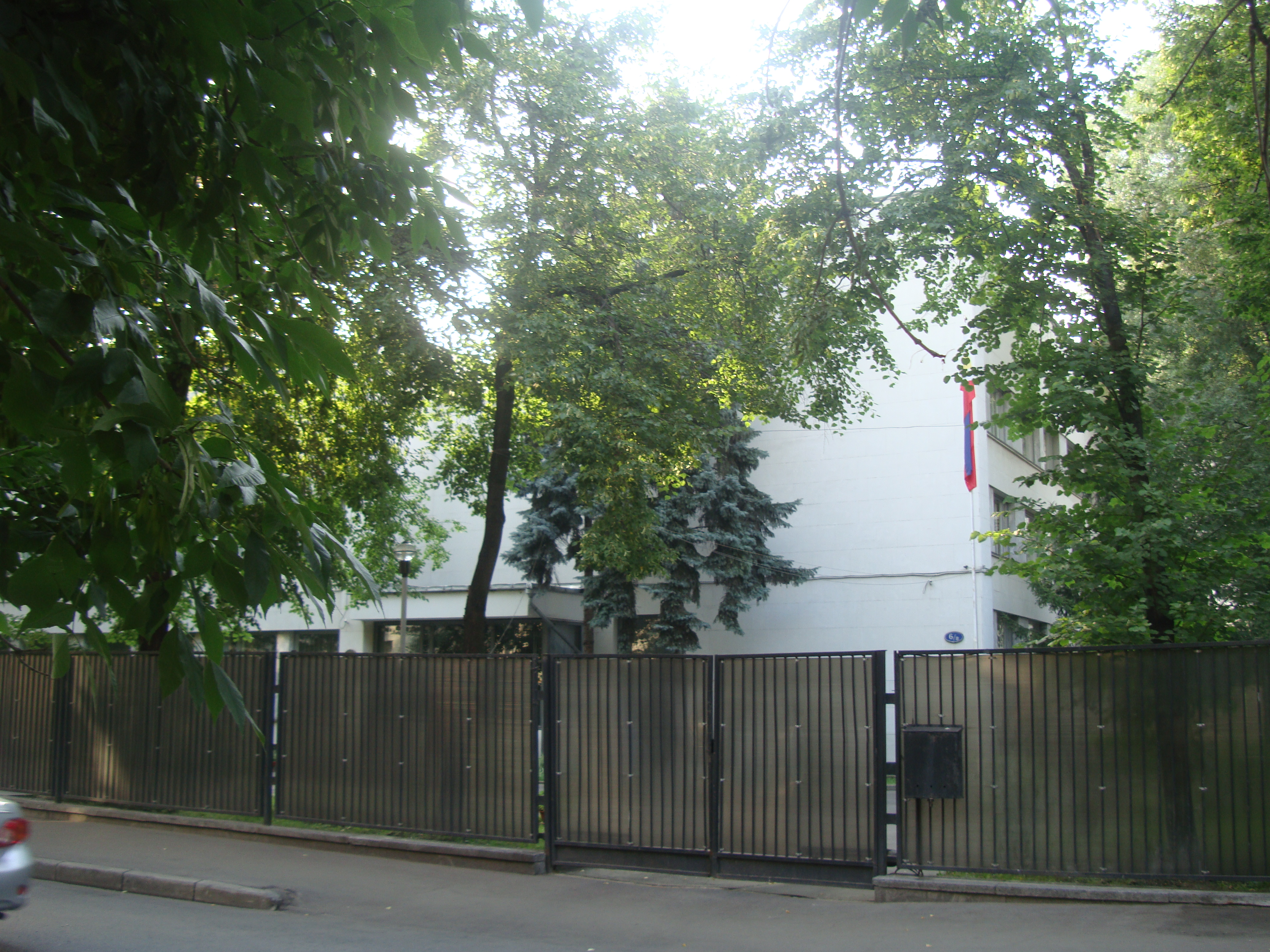
Embassy in Moscow

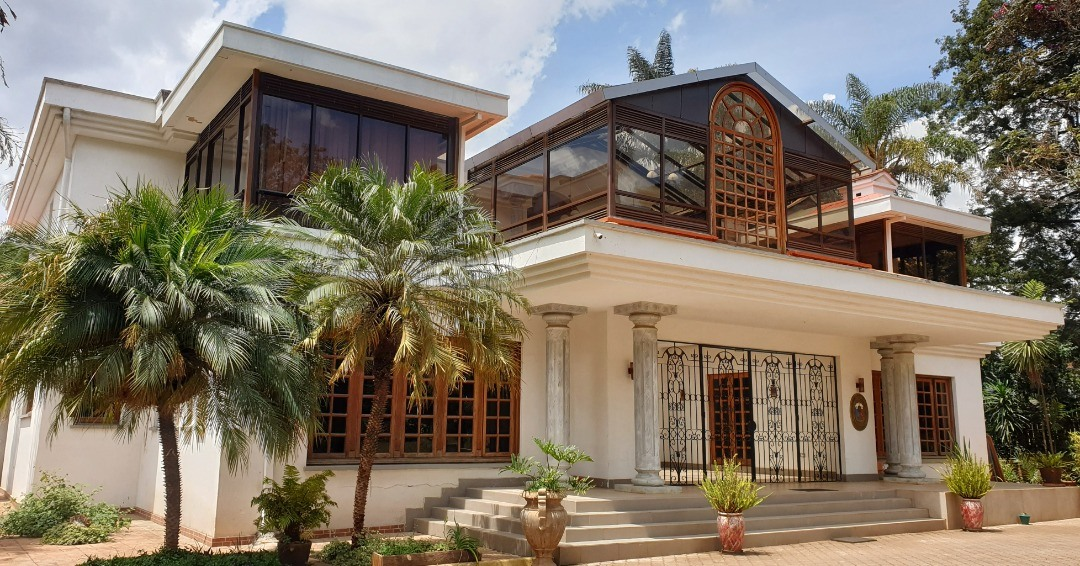
Embassy in Nairobi

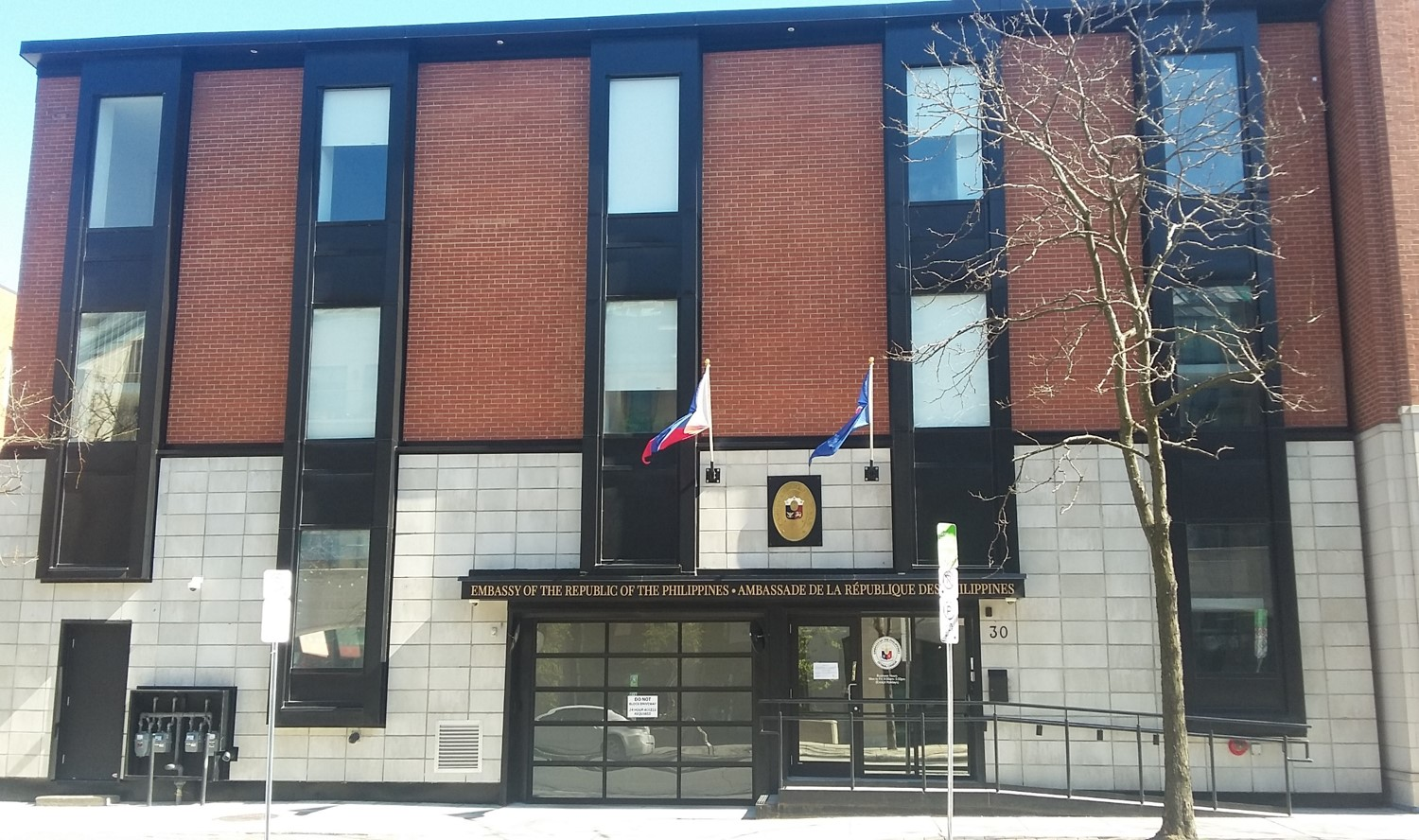
Embassy in Ottawa

Consulate-General in Calgary

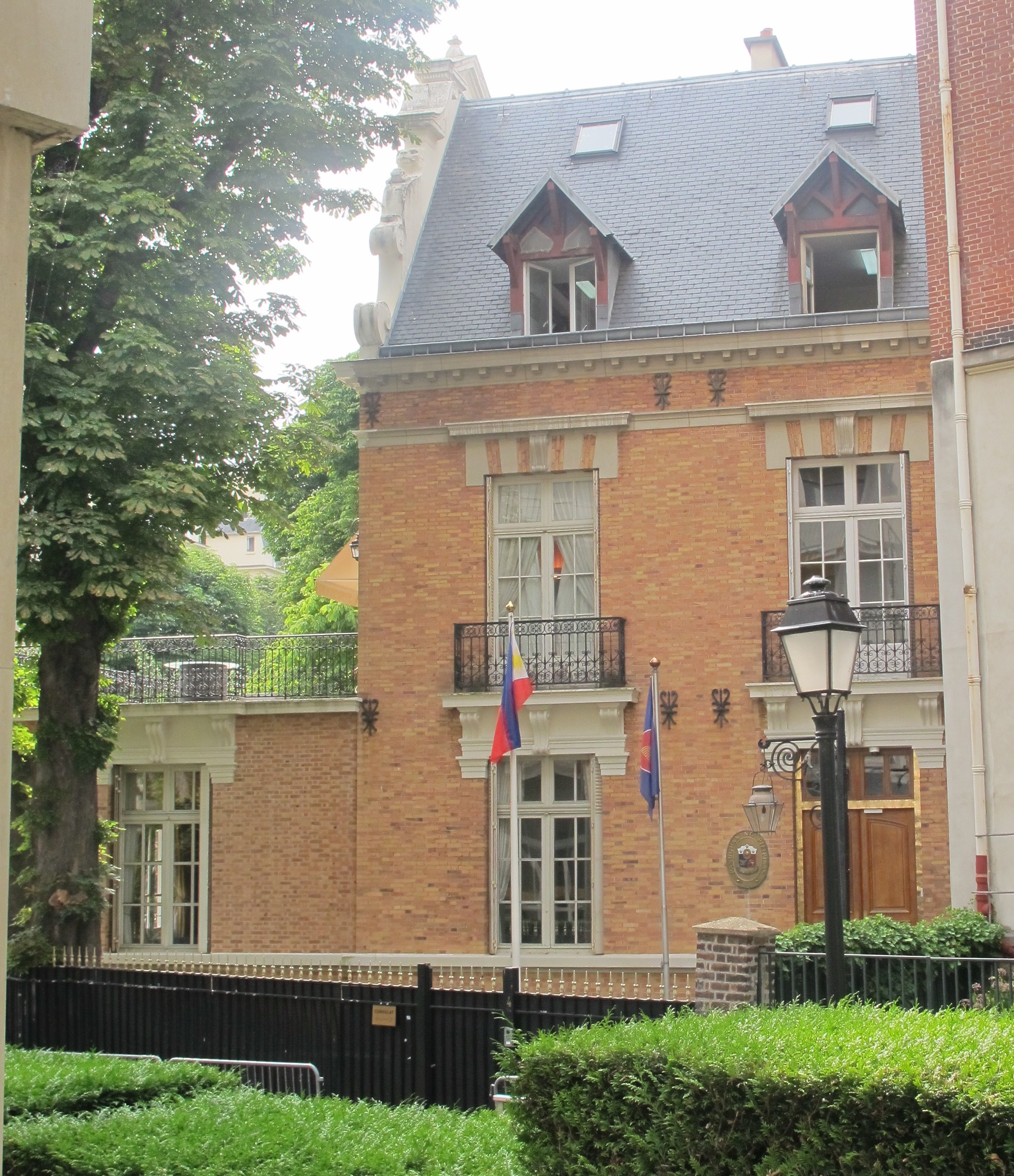
Embassy in Paris

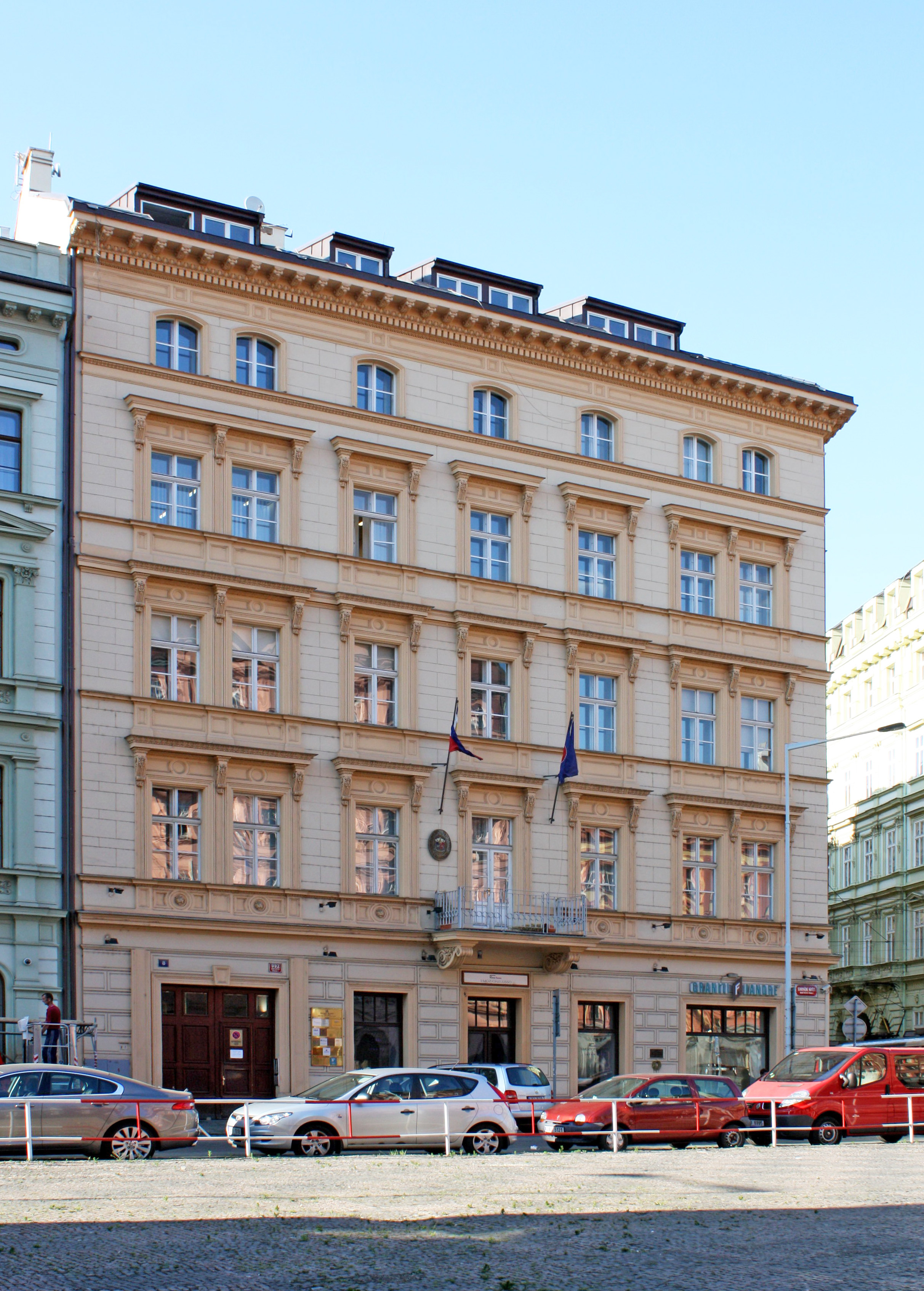
Building hosting the Embassy in Prague

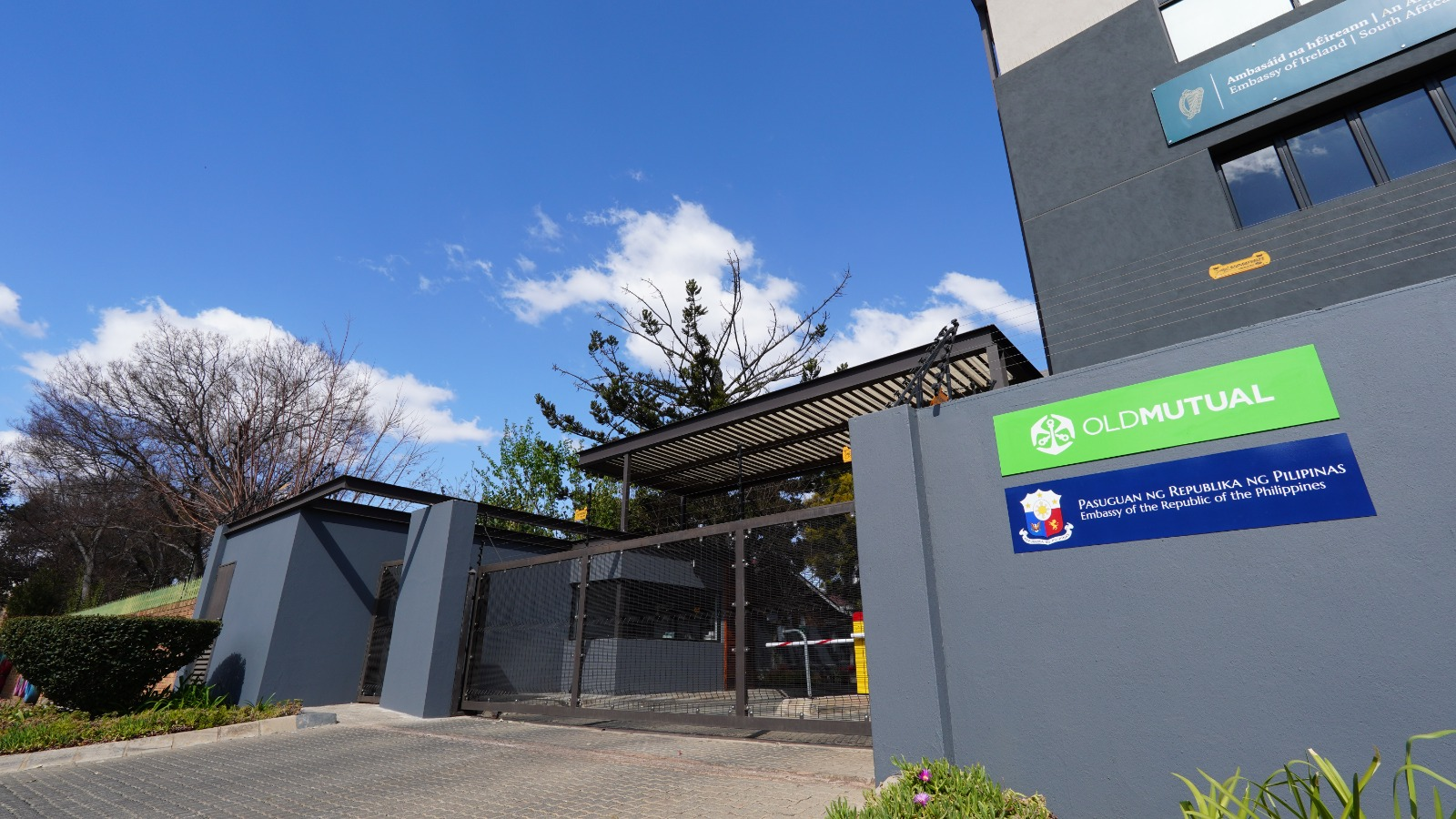
Building hosting the Embassy in Pretoria

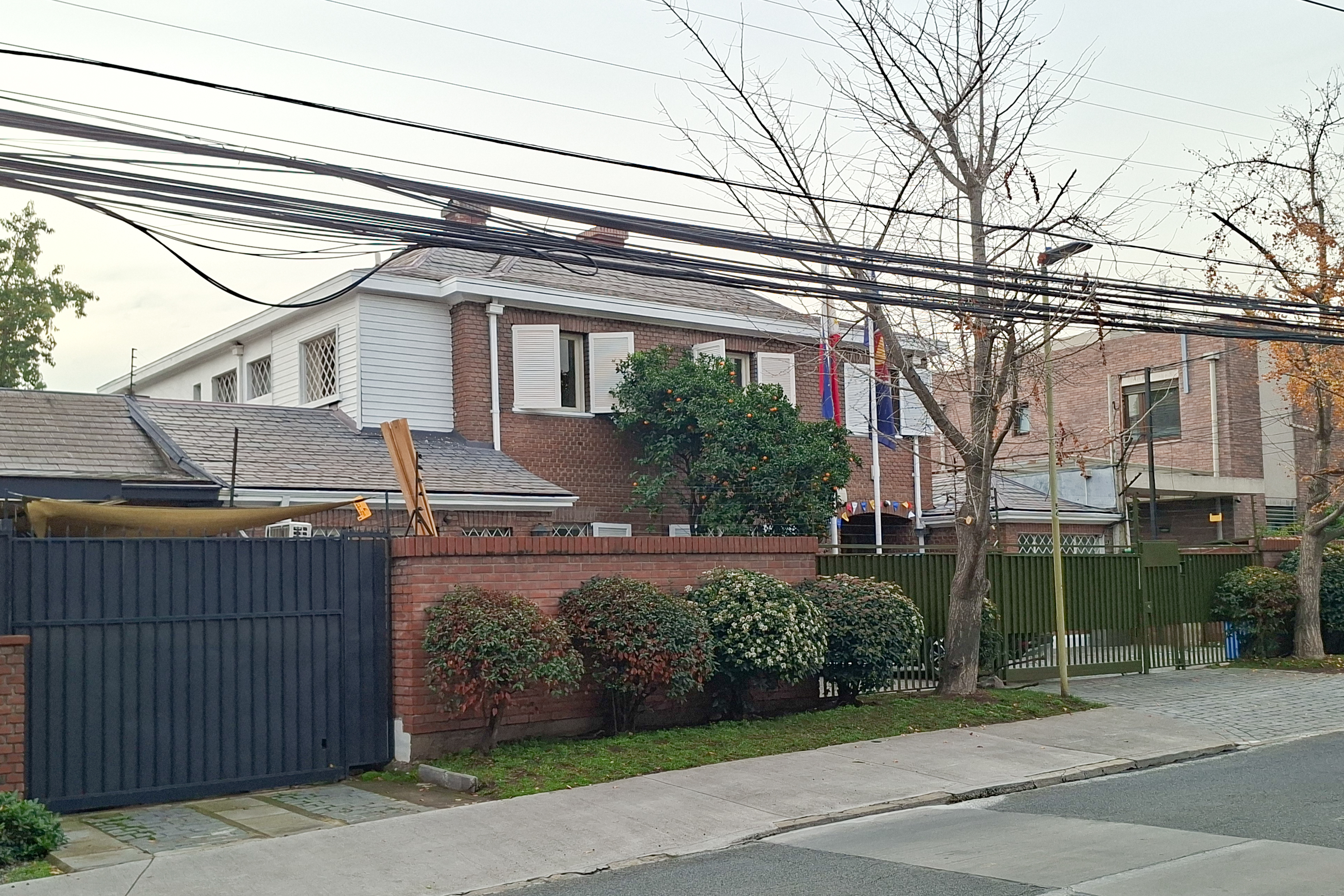
Embassy in Santiago de Chile

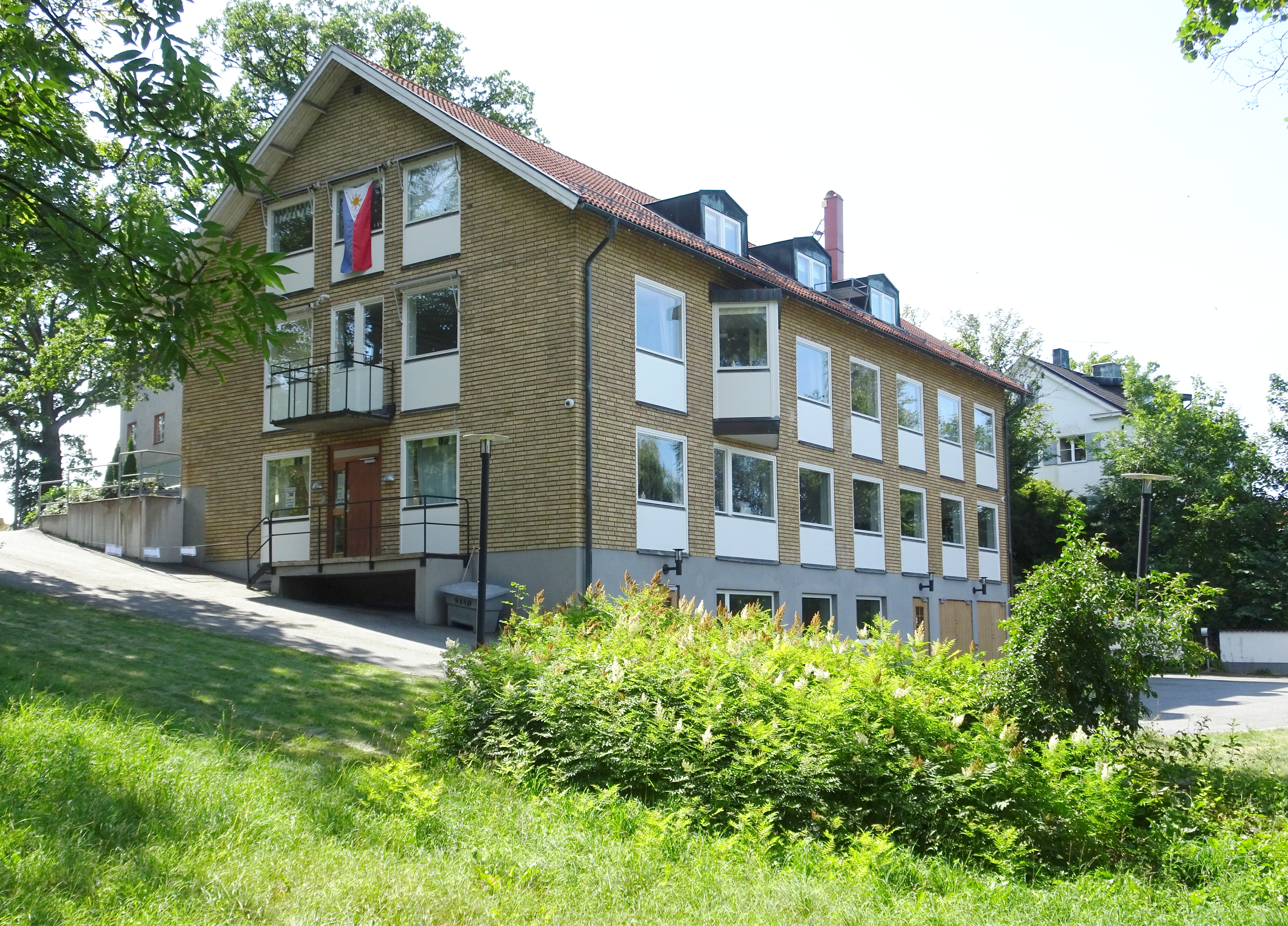
Embassy in Stockholm

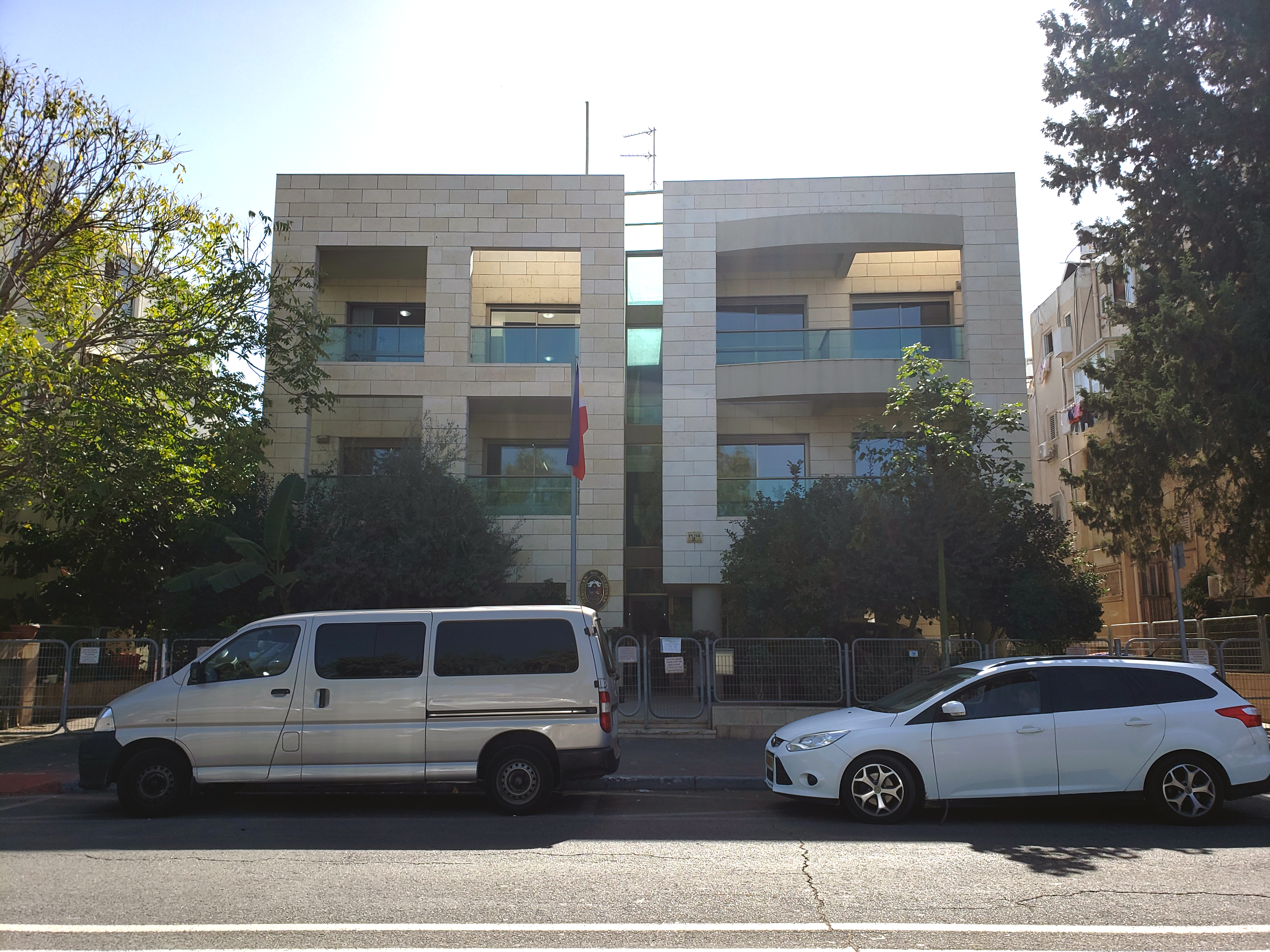
Embassy in Tel Aviv

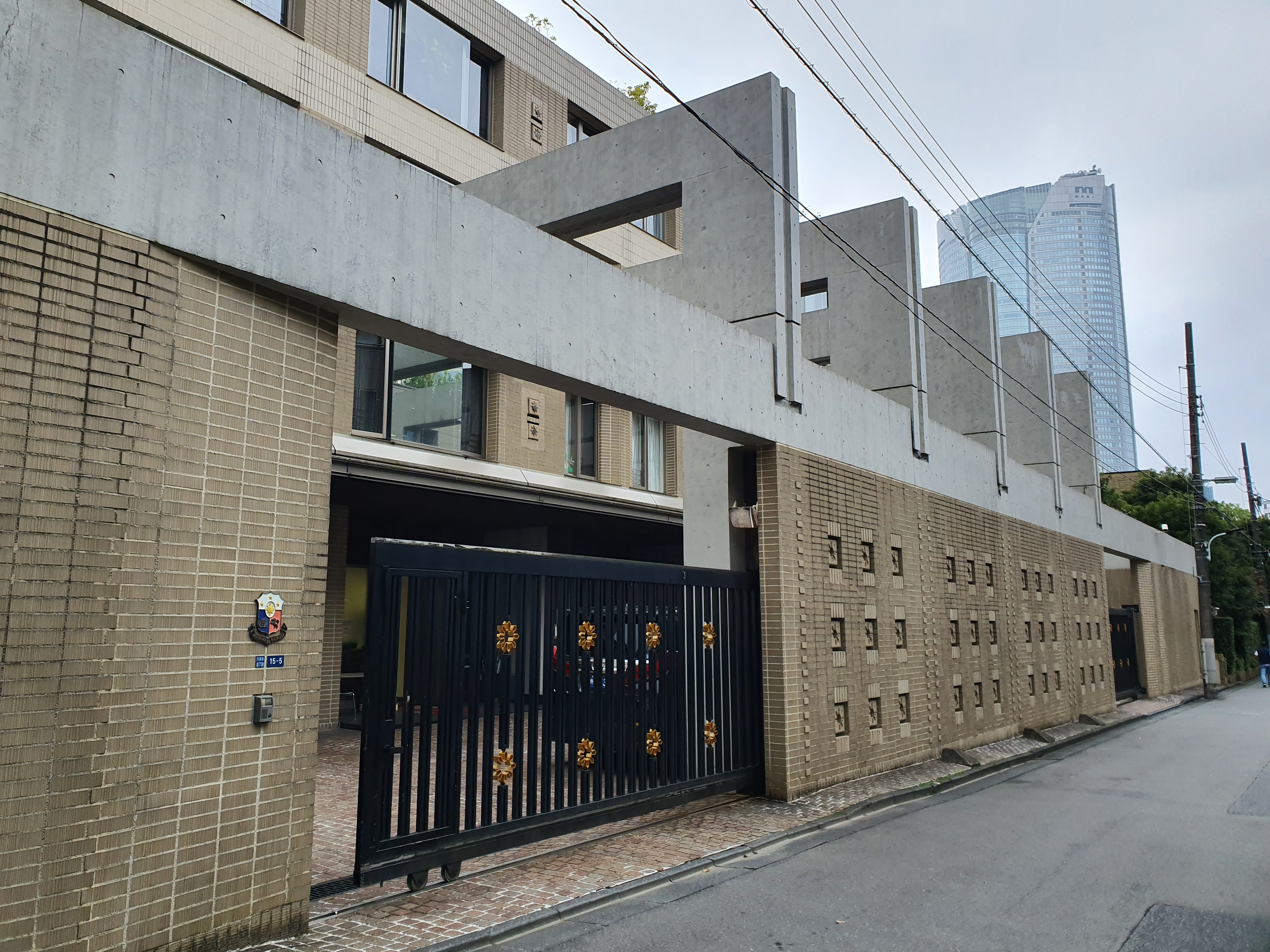
Embassy in Tokyo

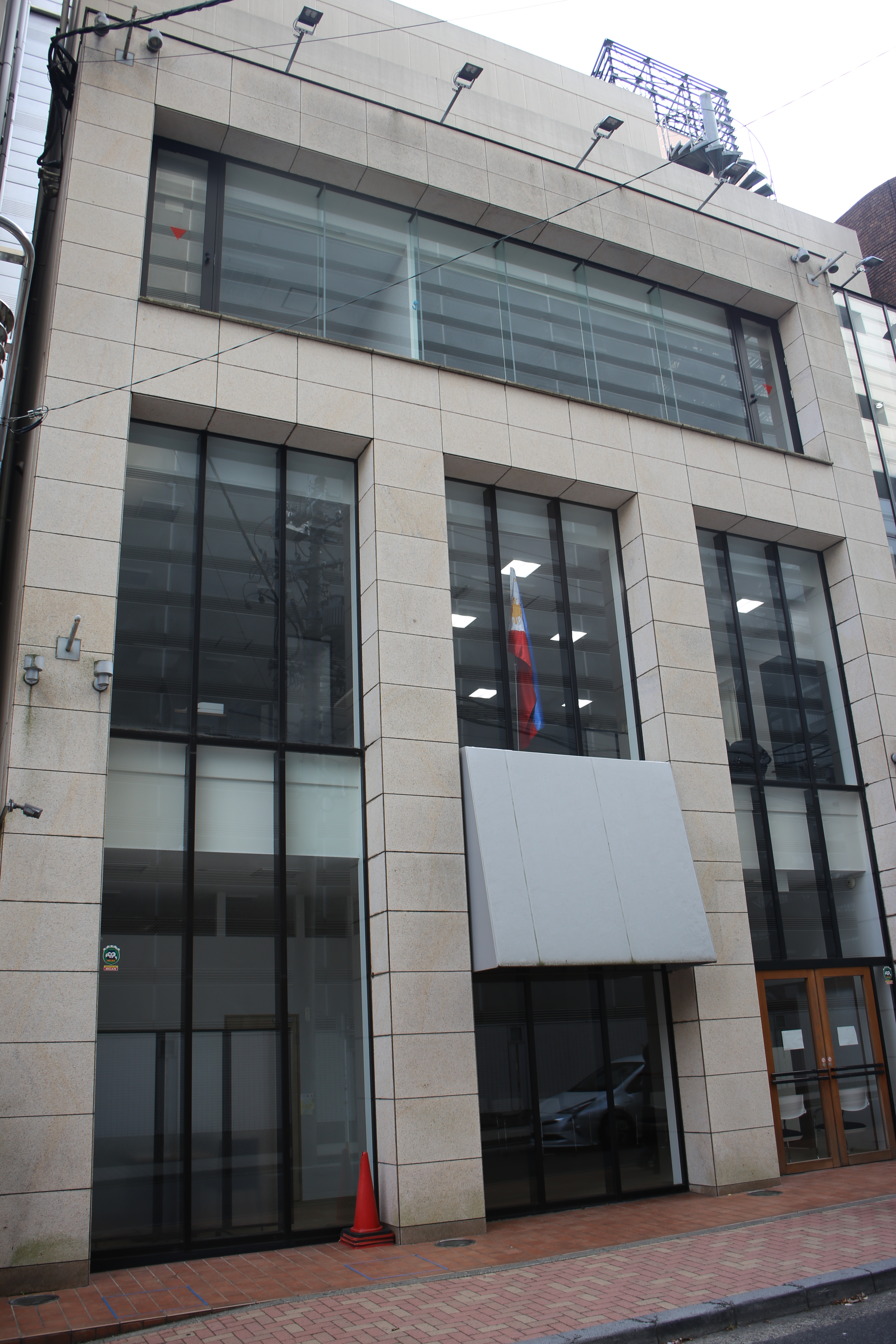
Consulate-General in Nagoya

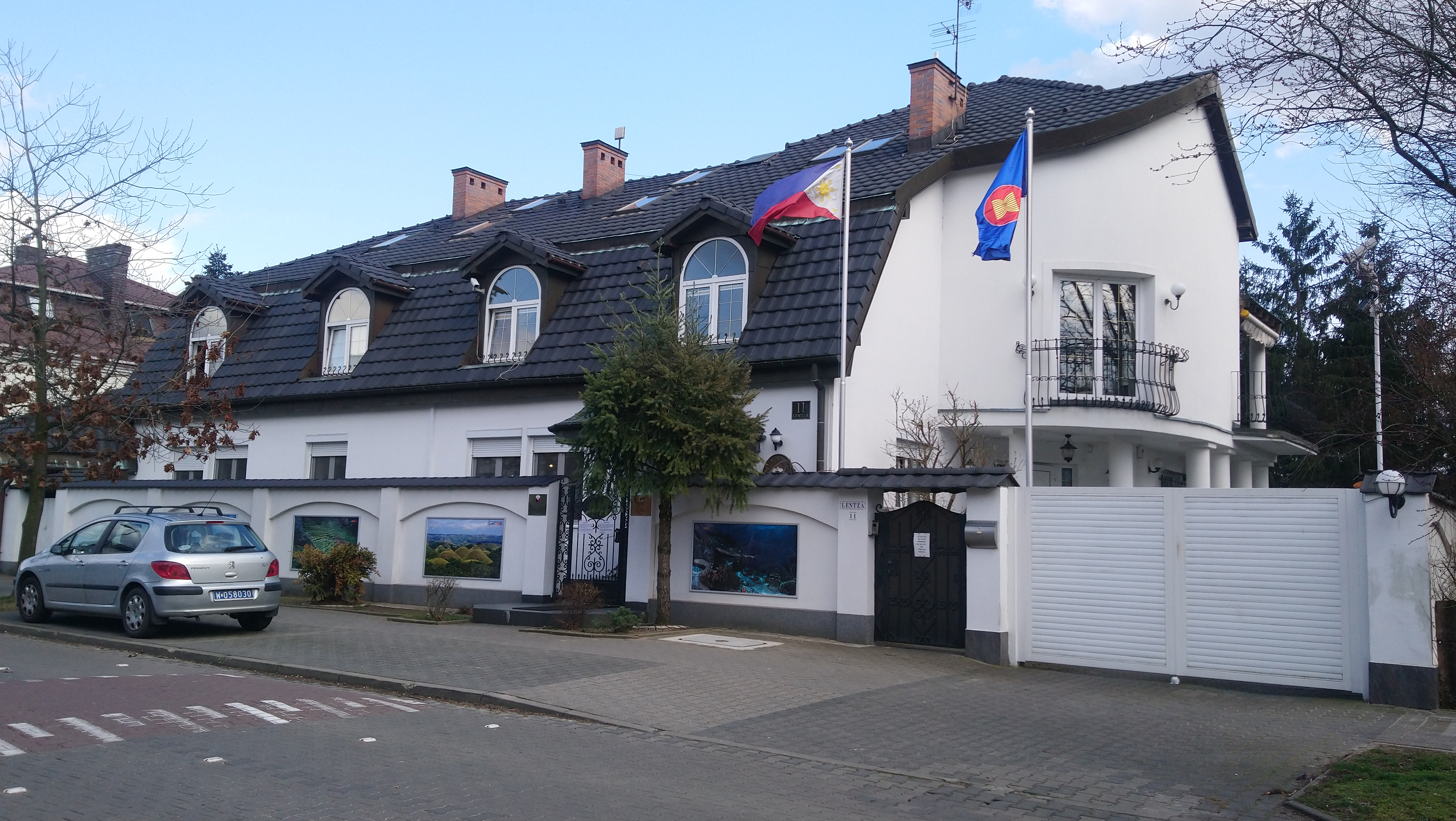
Embassy in Warsaw

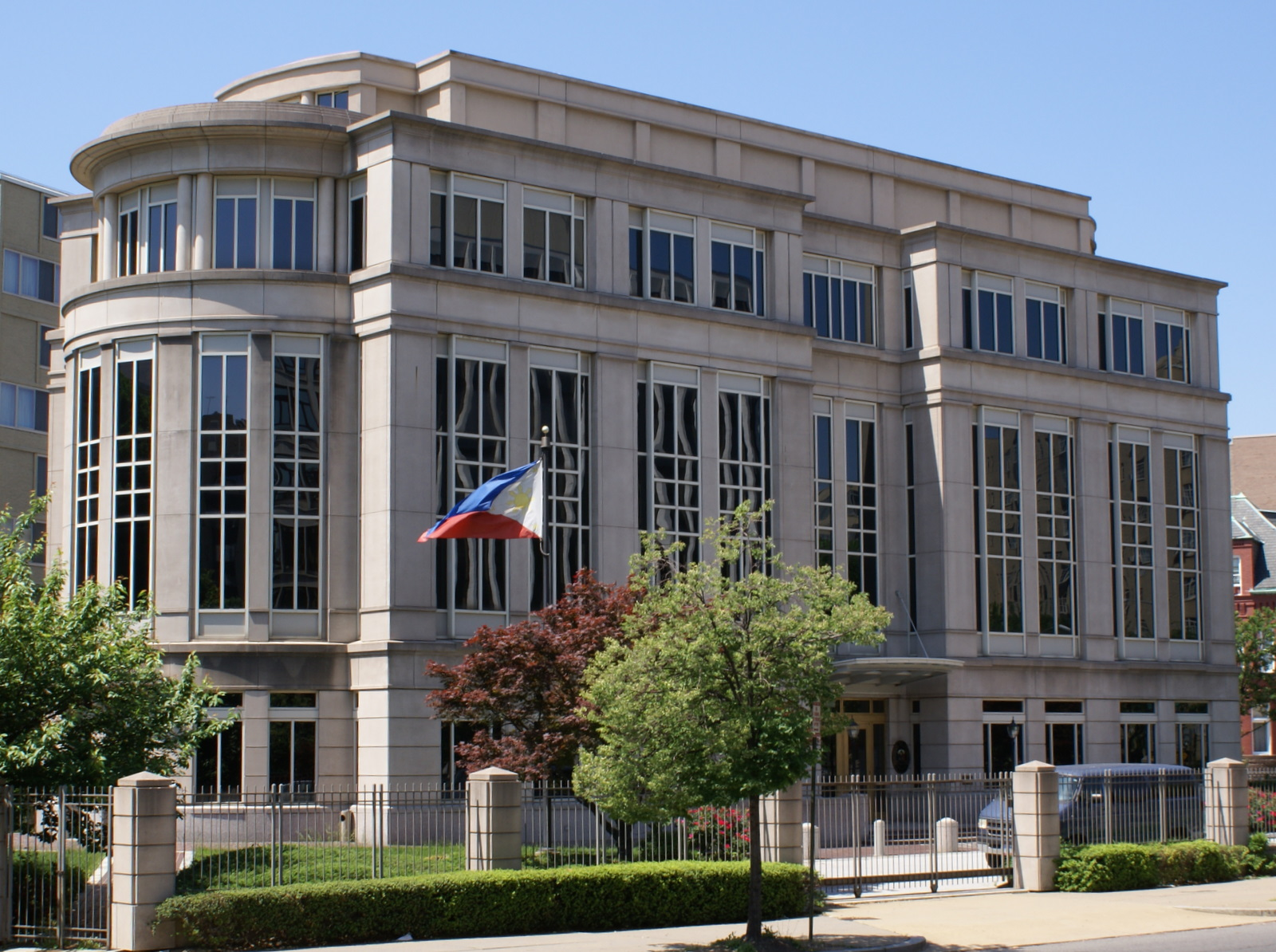
Embassy in Washington, D.C.

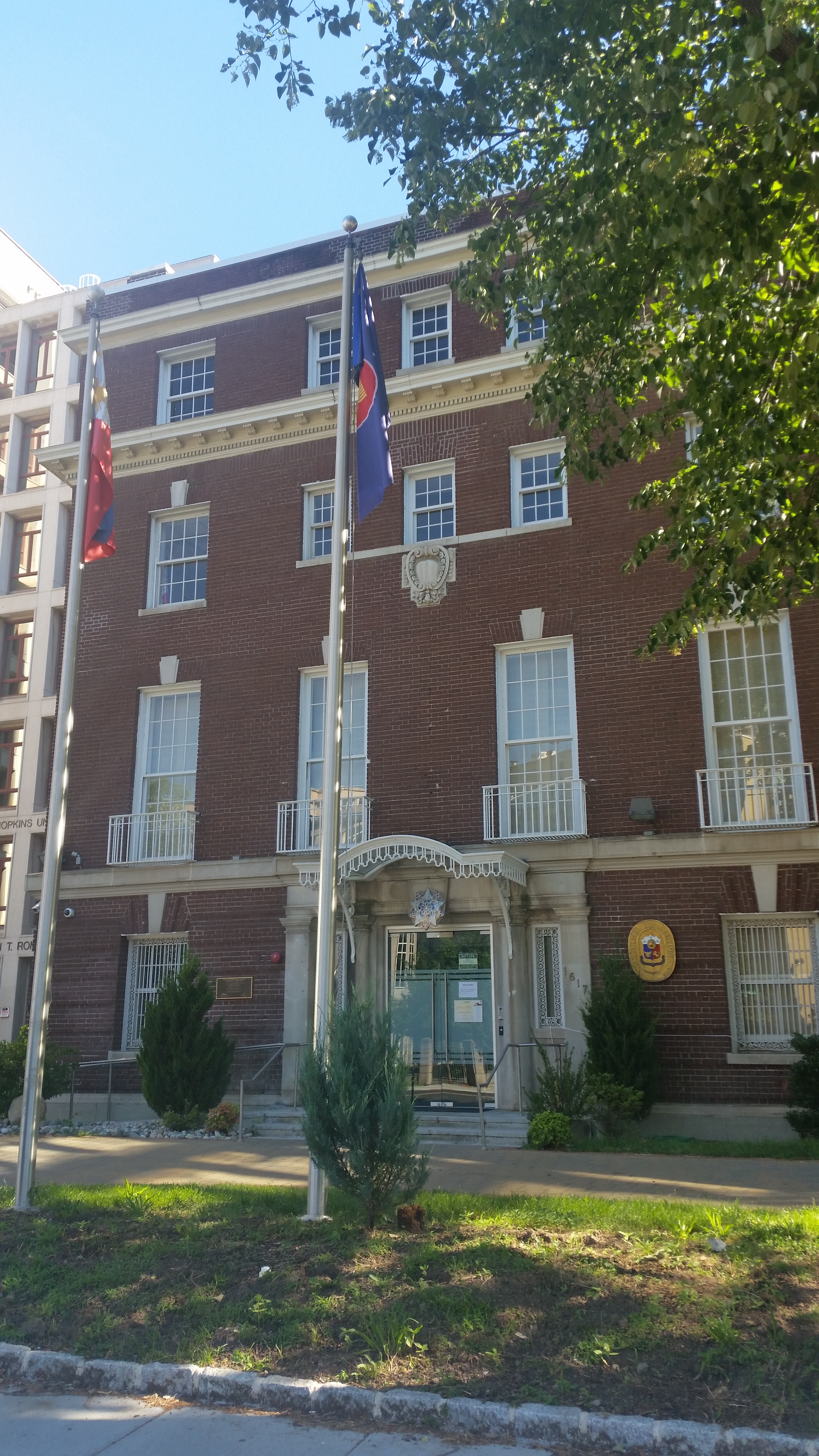
Embassy in Washington, D.C. (Consular Section)

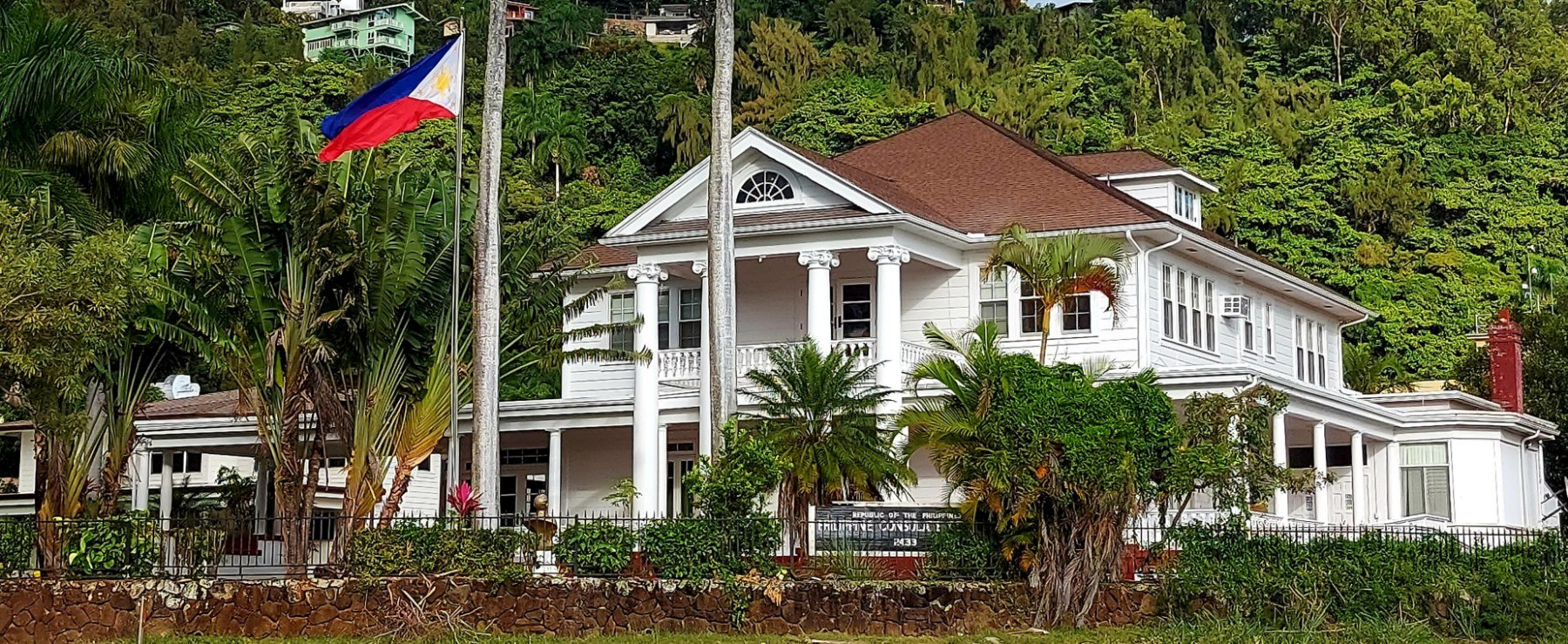
Consulate-General in Honolulu

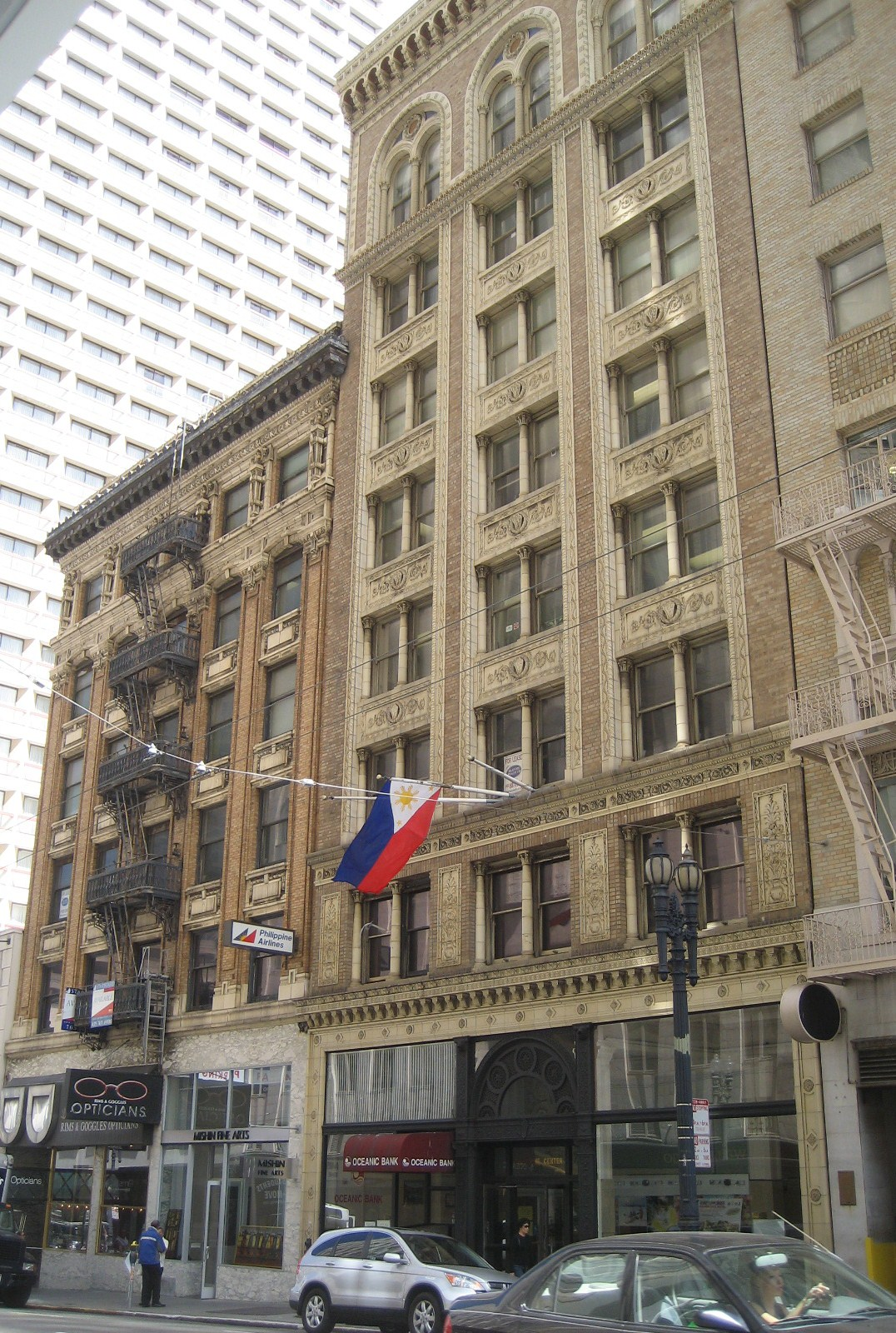
Consulate-General in San Francisco

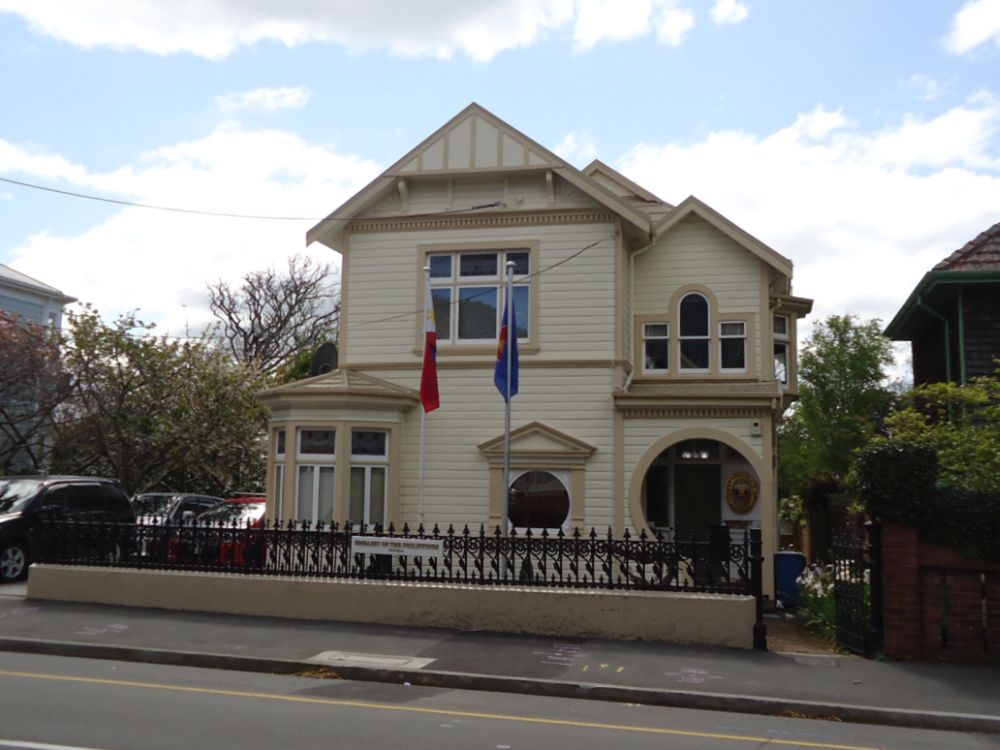
Embassy in Wellington

== Closed missions ==
=== Africa ===
Host country	Host city	Mission	Year closed	Ref.
Gabon	Libreville	Embassy	Unknown	
Madagascar	Antananarivo	Embassy	Unknown	
Senegal	Dakar	Embassy	1993	

=== Americas ===
Host country	Host city	Mission	Year closed	Ref.
Canada	Winnipeg	Consulate-General	1985	
Cuba	Havana	Embassy (Note: To be reopened.)	2012	
Peru	Lima	Embassy	1993	
United States	New Orleans	Consulate-General	1985	
United States	Portland, Oregon	Consulate	1949	
United States	Saipan, Northern Mariana Islands	Consulate-General	2012	
Venezuela	Caracas	Embassy	2012	

=== Asia ===
Host country	Host city	Mission	Year closed	Ref.
South Vietnam (Note: The embassy closed down on 29 April 1975, in the midst of the Fall of Saigon, which marked the end of the Vietnam War and the start of a transition period to the formal reunification of Vietnam.)	Saigon	Embassy	1975	
Sri Lanka	Colombo	Embassy	1993	

=== Europe ===
Host country	Host city	Mission	Year closed	Ref.
East Germany	East Berlin	Embassy (Note: The Philippines closed its embassy in East Berlin upon the reunification of Germany in 1990, which saw the dissolution of the Democratic Republic of Germany. A new embassy opened in Berlin in 1999.)	1990	
Germany	Bonn	Embassy extension office (Note: The Philippine embassy to West Germany was previously located in Bonn. Following the reunification of Germany in 1990, the embassy for the unified Germany was still maintained in Bonn, until 1999, which saw the opening of a new embassy in Berlin. However, the chancery in Bonn housed an extension office which remained operational until 2008.)	2008	
Germany	Hamburg	Consulate-General	2009	
Yugoslavia	Belgrade	Embassy	1992	

=== Oceania ===
Host country	Host city	Mission	Year closed	Ref.
Micronesia	Palikir	Embassy	1993	
Palau	Koror	Embassy	2012	

=== Multilateral organizations ===
Organization	Host city	Host country	Mission	Year closed	Ref.
European Communities	Brussels	Belgium	Permanent Mission	1985	
UNESCO	Paris	France	Permanent Mission	1985	

== Missions to open ==
Host country	Host city	Mission	Ref.
Cuba	Havana	Embassy	
Ghana	Accra	Embassy	
Kazakhstan	Astana	Embassy	
United States	Miami	Consulate-General	

== See also ==
- Foreign relations of the Philippines
- Lists of ambassadors of the Philippines
- List of diplomatic missions in the Philippines
- Sentro Rizal
- Visa policy of the Philippines
