= Embassy of the Philippines, Suva =

Diplomatic mission of the Philippines in Fiji

Embassy of the Philippines, Suva Pasuguan ng Pilipinas sa Suva
- Location: Suva
- Address: 23 Denison Road
- Coordinates: 18°9′22.3″S 178°25′36.8″E
- Opened: March 2, 2026
- Ambassador: Noel M. Novicio

The Embassy of the Philippines in Suva is the diplomatic mission of the Republic of the Philippines to the Republic of Fiji. Opened in 2026, it is currently located along Denison Road in central Suva.

== History ==
Although the Philippines and Fiji established diplomatic relations on December 18, 1973, relations between the two countries had historically been conducted through different missions. Initially under the jurisdiction of the Philippine Embassy in Palikir in the Federated States of Micronesia, Fiji was most recently under the jurisdiction of the Philippine Embassy in Wellington in New Zealand, which in turn maintained an honorary consulate in Suva headed by Virgilio de Asa.

In 2025, the cabinet of Fijian Prime Minister Sitiveni Rabuka endorsed the establishment of a resident Philippine diplomatic mission in Fiji as part of an effort to strengthen bilateral ties and deepen cooperation between the Philippines and other countries in the Pacific region. Philippine efforts to deepen engagement with the Pacific date back to at least 2023 when Finance Secretary Benjamin Diokno pushed for deeper Indo-Pacific regional economic integration, which culminated in President Bongbong Marcos announcing the creation of the Philippine Pacific Initiative, focused on disaster preparedness, food security, labor mobility and public health, in November 2024.

On October 15, 2025, Ma. Theresa P. Lazaro, Secretary of the Department of Foreign Affairs (DFA), shared during a conference that the embassy's opening, as well as that of other upcoming missions elsewhere, was part of the Philippine government's efforts to play a bigger role in international politics as great powers have increasingly stepped back from maintaining the current international order.

The advance team setting up the embassy arrived in Suva in November 2025, and are preparing to immediately begin offering consular services once the mission has completed all the required procedures for opening. Limited consular services began to be offered on March 2, 2026.

== Chancery ==
The chancery of the Philippine Embassy in Suva was initially located on 50 Ratu Sukuna Road in the Nasese neighborhood of southern Suva. It relocated to its current site on Denison Road in central Suva on July 1, 2026.

== Staff and activities ==
The Philippine Embassy in Suva is currently headed by Ambassador Noel M. Novicio, who was appointed to the position by President Marcos on August 13, 2025. Prior to his appointment as ambassador, Novicio, a career diplomat since 2001 and a former journalist, served as minister at the Permanent Mission of the Philippines to the United Nations, and before that served as deputy assistant secretary and executive director of the DFA's Office of ASEAN Affairs. After his appointment was confirmed by the Commission on Appointments on September 3, 2025, Novicio arrived in Fiji to assume his post on January 16, 2026, and he presented his credentials to Fijian President Naiqama Lalabalavu on February 26, 2026, becoming the first resident Philippine ambassador to Fiji.

In addition to Fiji, the mission also exercises jurisdiction over Samoa and Tonga, as well as consular jurisdiction over French Polynesia and Wallis and Futuna. It then also assumed jurisdiction over Kiribati, Nauru and Tuvalu from the Philippine Embassy in Canberra a few months later.

== See also ==
- List of diplomatic missions of the Philippines
- List of diplomatic missions in Fiji
