= Consulate General of the Philippines, Busan =

Diplomatic mission of the Philippines in Busan, South Korea

Consulate General of the Philippines, Busan Konsulado Panlahat ng Pilipinas sa Busan 주부산 필리핀 총영사관

- Location: Busan
- Address: 40, Munhyeongeumyung-ro, Nam-gu
- Coordinates: 35°8′50.5″N 129°3′56.2″E
- Chargé d'affaires: Mahgie B. Lacaba

The Consulate General of the Philippines in Busan is a diplomatic mission of the Republic of the Philippines in South Korea, representing the country's interests in the Yeongnam region. Opened in 2026, it is located on the twelfth floor of the Busan International Finance Center in the Nam District of central Busan.

== History ==
The Philippines first established a diplomatic presence in Busan in 2000, when the Philippine government appointed Lee Eun-kyu as the country's first honorary consul to the city. He was then followed by Lee Geun-cheol, who served as honorary consul until his resignation in 2007.

After Lee's resignation, the Philippines did not have a diplomatic presence in Busan until the opening of a new honorary consulate general on January 28, 2016. Headed by An Sang-wook, a professor of social welfare at Kosin University who had previously pursued his undergraduate and doctoral education in the Philippines, the opening of a mission was Busan was done to celebrate the fifth anniversary of sister city ties between Busan and Cebu City.

Plans for a career Philippine consulate in Busan were first announced in 2025, when Ma. Theresa B. Dizon-de Vega, who was ending her tour of duty at the Philippine Embassy in Seoul as ambassador to South Korea, disclosed in her farewell call to Park Heong-joon, the mayor of Busan, that the Philippines was already preparing to open a career consulate as part of the country's push to deepen ties with South Korea, as well as reinforcing the Philippines' commitment to serving Filipino citizens in the southern half of the country, many of whom are Overseas Filipino Workers. A trade delegation visiting Busan in September 2025 later confirmed that an advance team was already being assembled to review locations for a future consulate, and Dizon-de Vega, who had since become undersecretary of the Department of Foreign Affairs (DFA), later confirmed this development during the South Korean National Foundation Day reception in Taguig on October 1, 2025. President Bongbong Marcos then announced during a meeting with the Filipino community in Busan on October 30, 2025 that a career consulate in Busan will open in 2026. The mission's opening was paired with the opening of a Social Security System office in Seoul, both of which are intended to facilitate access to Philippine government services in South Korea.

The advance team setting up the consulate announced that they had met with the Busan metropolitan government on December 10, 2025 to discuss the opening of the consulate, which was scheduled for early 2026, although the consulate had organized a consular outreach event with the Philippine Embassy in Seoul for Filipinos in the city three days before. The consulate finally opened for limited consular services on January 26, 2026, with full operations scheduled for February 23, 2026.

== Chancery ==
The chancery of the Philippine Consulate General in Busan opened on January 26, 2026 out of a WeWork office on the twelfth floor of the Busan International Finance Center.

On January 22, 2026, shortly before opening for limited operations, the consulate released bidding documents indicating that it was looking to relocate the chancery to a new temporary office beginning in March.

== Staff and activities ==
The Philippine Consulate General in Busan is provisionally headed by an acting head of post (equivalent to a chargé d'affaires for missions that are not embassies), pending the appointment of a new consul general by the Philippine government. The current acting head of post is Mahgie B. Lacaba, the mission's vice consul.

== See also ==
- List of diplomatic missions of the Philippines
- List of diplomatic missions in South Korea
