= Consulate General of the Philippines, Nagoya =

Diplomatic mission of the Philippines in Nagoya, Japan

Consulate General of the Philippines, Nagoya Konsulado Panlahat ng Pilipinas sa Nagoya 在名古屋フィリピン総領事館

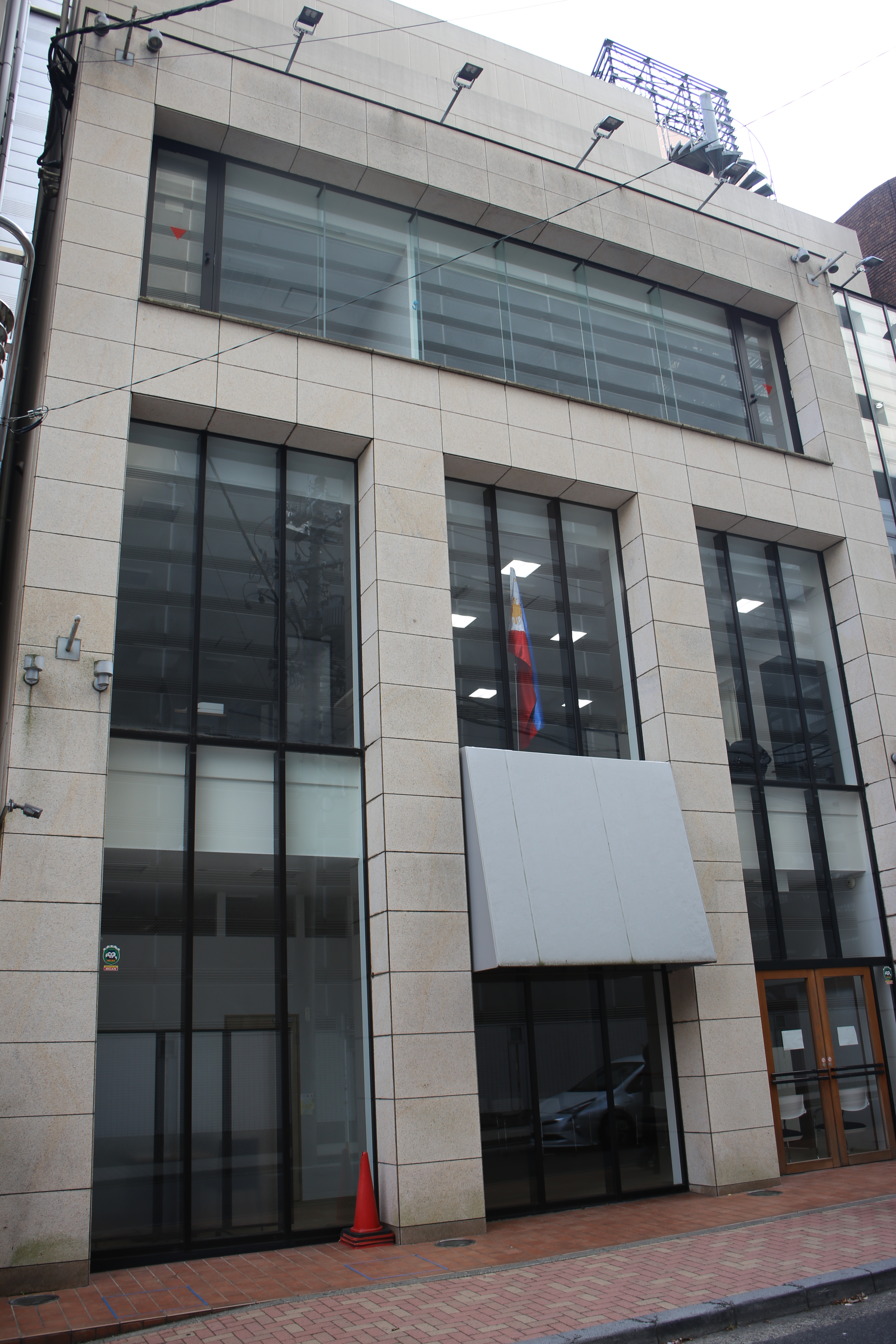
- Location: Nagoya
- Address: 31-3, Sakae 3-chōme, Naka-ku
- Coordinates: 35°9′50.8″N 136°54′29.6″E
- Consul General: Shirlene C. Mananquil
- Website: nagoyapcg.dfa.gov.ph

The Consulate General of the Philippines in Nagoya (在名古屋フィリピン総領事館, Zai Nagoya Firipin Sōryōjikan) is a diplomatic mission of the Republic of the Philippines in Japan, representing the country's interests in Aichi Prefecture and the Chūbu region. Opened in 2020, it is located in the Sakae district of Nagoya's Naka ward, beside the Matsuzakaya department store.

== History ==
The Philippine Consulate General in Nagoya was opened on December 1, 2020, taking over from a previous honorary consulate. Although a resident mission had been requested for many years by members of the local Filipino community, planning for the consulate only began in 2019, when funds for the mission, on the initiative of Senator Loren Legarda, were allocated for its opening.

On February 18, 2019, Foreign Affairs Secretary Teodoro Locsin Jr. announced during the inauguration of the Philippine Embassy in Berlin's new chancery that a mission in Nagoya was set to open as part of an expansion of the Philippines' diplomatic presence under President Rodrigo Duterte. The Japanese government gave its approval later that year, and in December 2019, the DFA started looking for locations where the consulate could be based.

The consulate initially opened for passport and civil registry procedures, with visa application processing starting in 2021.

== Staff and activities ==
The Philippine Consulate General in Nagoya is headed by Consul General Shirlene C. Mananquil, who assumed the position on June 18, 2025. Prior to her appointment as consul general, Mananquil, a career diplomat, most recently served as consul general at the Philippine Consulate General in Istanbul.

Currently, the consulate's jurisdiction extends over Aichi, Fukui, Gifu, Ishikawa, Nagano, Niigata, Shizuoka, Toyama and Yamanashi prefectures, covering the entire Chūbu region. Before its opening, jurisdiction over the Chūbu region was split, with the western half (Aichi, Fukui, Gifu, Ishikawa and Toyama) falling under the jurisdiction of the Philippine Consulate General in Osaka, and the eastern half (Nagano, Niigata, Shizuoka and Yamanashi) falling under the jurisdiction of the Philippine Embassy in Tokyo.

Since its opening, the consulate has undertaken a number of initiatives to promote economic and cultural ties between the Philippines and the Chūbu region, with its goal being to serve as a bridge between the Philippines and Japan in the area. These including paying a courtesy call to Chukeiren (the Central Japan Economic Federation), and strengthening ties with the local governments under its consular area.

== See also ==
- List of diplomatic missions of the Philippines
- List of diplomatic missions in Japan
