= Lists of ambassadors of the Philippines =

List of ambassadors of the Philippines may refer to:

- List of ambassadors of the Philippines to Argentina
- List of ambassadors of the Philippines to Australia
- List of ambassadors of the Philippines to Austria
- List of ambassadors of the Philippines to Bahrain
- List of ambassadors of the Philippines to Brazil
- List of ambassadors of the Philippines to Brunei
- List of ambassadors of the Philippines to Canada
- List of ambassadors of the Philippines to the Czech Republic
- List of ambassadors of the Philippines to Egypt
- List of ambassadors of the Philippines to France
- List of ambassadors of the Philippines to Germany
- List of ambassadors of the Philippines to Iran
- List of ambassadors of the Philippines to Japan
- List of ambassadors of the Philippines to Lebanon
- List of ambassadors of the Philippines to the Netherlands
- List of ambassadors of the Philippines to New Zealand
- List of ambassadors of the Philippines to Norway
- List of ambassadors of the Philippines to Peru
- List of ambassadors of the Philippines to Saudi Arabia
- List of ambassadors of the Philippines to Singapore
- List of ambassadors of the Philippines to South Korea
- List of ambassadors of the Philippines to Spain
- List of ambassadors of the Philippines to Switzerland
- List of ambassadors of the Philippines to Timor-Leste
- List of ambassadors of the Philippines to Turkey
- List of ambassadors of the Philippines to the United Arab Emirates
- List of ambassadors of the Philippines to the United Kingdom
- List of ambassadors of the Philippines to the United States
- List of ambassadors of the Philippines to Vietnam
- Permanent Representative of the Philippines to the United Nations
