= List of diplomatic missions in Damascus =

This is a list of the 51 resident embassies in Damascus. For other diplomatic missions in Syria, see list of diplomatic missions in Syria.

== Embassies ==
Embassy	Location	Head of Mission (Ambassador/Chargé d'Affaires)	Image	Ref.
Algeria		Abdulqader Qasmi al-Hussaini (Ambassador)		
Argentina		Status is unclear after the fall of the former regime; the embassy has remained open		
Armenia		Rouben Kharazian (Ambassador)		
Austria	Farabi Street 7, Mezzeh	Christoph Weidinger (Ambassador)		
Azerbaijan		Elnur Shahhuseynov (Chargé d'Affaires)		
Bahrain		Waheed Mubarak Sayyar (Ambassador)		
Belarus		Yuri Sluka (Ambassador)		
Brazil	10 Ahmad Al-Abed Street, Shaban Building, West Mezzeh	João Zanini (Chargé d’Affaires)		
Bulgaria		Chavdar Mitev (Chargé d'Affaires)		
Chile		vacant or not named but open		
China		Shi Hongwei (Ambassador)		
Cuba		Luis Mariano Fernández (Ambassador)		
Cyprus		Michalis Hadjikyrou (Chargé d'Affaires)		
Czech Republic		Vítězslav Pivoňka (Ambassador)		
Egypt		Osama Khader (Chargé d'Affaires)		
Eritrea		not named		
France		Jean-Baptiste Faivre (Chargé d'Affaires)		
Germany	Abdulmunem Al-Riad Street, Malki	Clemens Hach (Chargé d'Affaires)		
Greece		Emmanuel Kakavelakis (Ambassador)		
Holy See (Vatican City)	B.P. 2271, Malki, Place Ma'raket Ajnadin	Claudio Gugerotti (Ambassador)		
Hungary		Soós István Gyula (Chargé d'Affaires)		
India		Renu Yadav (Chargé d'Affaires)		
Indonesia		Lukman Hakim Siregar (Ambassador)		
Iraq	Abou Jaafar Al Mansour St	Yassin Sharif Al-Hujaimi (Chargé d'Affaires)		
Italy	Ata al-Ayoubi Street 4	Stefano Ravagnan (Ambassador)		
Jordan		Sufyan Suleiman Al-Qudah (Ambassador)		
Lebanon		Henry Kastoun (Ambassador)		
Kuwait		Abdulrahman Shehab Al-Shehab (Ambassador)		
Libya		Walid Ammar (Chargé d'Affaires)		
Mauritania		Taleb Al-Mukhtar Muhammad Al-Mujtaba (Ambassador)		
Morocco		Abdullah Babah (Chargé d'Affaires)		
Nigeria		Mohammed Ibrahim Yunusa (Chargé d'Affaires)		
Oman		Turki bin Mahmoud al-Busaidi (Ambassador)		
Pakistan		Muhammad Mughees Afzal (Chargé d'Affaires)		
Palestine		Samir Al-Rifai (Ambassador)		
Philippines		John G. Reyes (Chargé d'Affaires)		
Qatar		Khalifa Abdullah Al Mahmoud (Ambassador)		
Romania		Radu-Nicolae Gîmbuțan (Chargé d'Affaires)		
Russia		Evgeny Kozlov (Chargé d'Affaires)		
Saudi Arabia	Al-Jalaa Street	Faisal Al-Mufjel (Ambassador)		
Serbia		vacant or not named but open		
Somalia		Abiib Muse (Ambassador)		
South Africa		Ashraf Yusuf Suliman (Ambassador)		
Spain	392 Makka Mukarrama St., East Mezzeh	Francisco Javier Puga Llopis (Chargé d'Affaires)		
Sudan		Ahmad Ibrahim Hassan (Chargé d'Affaires)		
Tunisia		Muhammad Al-Madhabi (Ambassador)		
Turkey	Chare Ziad Ben Abi Soufian 56–58	Nuh Yilmaz (Ambassador)		
United Arab Emirates	Abu Romane, Mhdi Bin Barake Street 1	Hamad Rashid bin Alwan Al-Habsi (Ambassador)		
Venezuela	03 Alkhansaa Str. Bldg., Mezzeh	not clear after the fall of the former regime even though the embassy remained open		
Yemen	Shafai Street, Bldg. No. 176, Mezzeh	Mohammed Azzi Bakr (Chargé d'Affaires)		

== Other missions ==
Country/Territory/Organization	Mission type	Location	Image	Reference
European Union	Delegation	Beirut, Amman and Brussels		
Switzerland	Humanitarian aid office			

== See also ==
- Foreign policy of Syria
- List of diplomatic missions of Syria
- List of diplomatic missions in Syria
