= List of ambassadors of the Philippines to Egypt =

Ambassador of the Republic of the Philippines to the Arab Republic of Egypt
- Sugo ng Republika ng Pilipinas sa Republikang Arabo ng Ehipto سفير جمهورية الفلبين لدى جمهورية مصر العربية
- Seal of the Department of Foreign Affairs of the Philippines
- Incumbent; Ezzedin H. Tago since September 11, 2021
- Department of Foreign Affairs; Embassy of the Philippines, Cairo
- Style: His/Her Excellency
- Reports to: Department of Foreign Affairs
- Seat: Cairo, Egypt
- Nominator: Secretary of Foreign Affairs
- Appointer: President of the Philippines; with the advice and consent of the Commission on Appointments
- Term length: No fixed term
- Inaugural holder: Pulong Arpa
- Formation: April 12, 1957
- Website: Philippine Embassy, Cairo, Egypt

The ambassador of the Republic of the Philippines to the Arab Republic of Egypt (Filipino: Sugo ng Republika ng Pilipinas sa Republikang Arabo ng Ehipto; Arabic: سفير جمهورية الفلبين لدى جمهورية مصر العربية : safir jumhuriat alfilibiyn ladaa jumhuriat misr alearabia) is the Republic of the Philippines' foremost diplomatic representative in the Arab Republic of Egypt. As head of the Philippines' diplomatic mission there, the ambassador is the official representative of the president and the government of the Philippines to the president and government of Egypt. The position has the rank and status of an ambassador extraordinary and plenipotentiary.

This diplomatic post and the embassy have jurisdiction over the countries of Egypt, Sudan, Djibouti, Ethiopia, and Eritrea.

== List of representatives ==
Image	Head of mission	Tenure	Note(s)
	Pulong Arpa	1957−1963	Arpa was initially minister plenipotentiary to the country until it was elevated to the rank of ambassador in 1960, following the consulate's elevation to an embassy.
	Juan M. Arreglado	1964−1969	
	Yusup Abubakar	1971−1973	
	Jose V. Cruz	1976−1979	
	Felino C. Menez	1979−1984	
	Romulo Espaldon	1984−1986	
	Kasan Marohombsar	1986−1993	
	Menandro Galenzoga	1993−1996	
	Sanchez A. Ali	1997−1998	
	Macabangkit Lanto	1999−2001	
	Shulan O. Primavera	2002−2004	
	Petronila P. Garcia	May 2004 − January 2008	
	Oscar G. Valenzuela	February 7, 2008 − July 7, 2010	
	Eduardo Pablo M. Maglaya	October 1, 2010 - June 29, 2011	Chargé d' Affaires
	Claro S. Cristobal	December 30, 2011 - June 27, 2015	
	Leslie J. Baja	August 2015 - September 24, 2018	
	Sulpicio M. Confiado	November 10, 2018 − July 7, 2021	
	Ezzedin H. Tago	September 11, 2021 − present	Credentials were presented on September 15, 2021.
Source: Embassy of the Republic of the Philippines, Cairo

== See also ==
- Egypt–Philippines relations
