= Imelda Panolong =

Filipina career diplomat

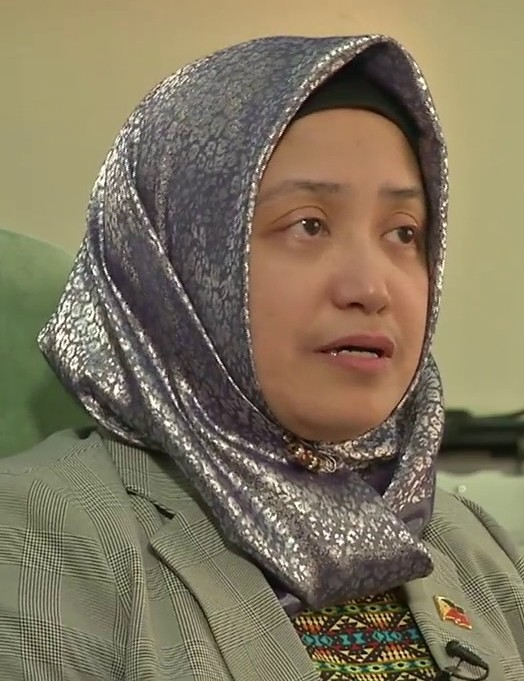
- Panolong in 2017

Ambassador of the Philippines to Oman
- Incumbent
- Assumed office August 16, 2020
- President: Rodrigo Duterte
- Preceded by: Narciso T. Castañeda

Personal details
- Born: January 9, 1968 (age 58) Malaysia
- Spouse: Jamel Panolong
- Children: 3
- Education: University of the Philippines Diliman

Imelda Macapundag Panolong (born January 9, 1968) is a Filipina career diplomat who is the current Ambassador of the Philippines to Oman. She is the first Muslim woman in the Philippine diplomatic corps to be promoted to the rank of Career Minister and later, Chief of Mission, Class II and also the first female Muslim ambassador of the Philippines. Before becoming ambassador, she served as the consul general of the Philippine Consulate in Jeddah, Saudi Arabia and has completed tours of duty in Pakistan, Bahrain, Canada, Indonesia and the United States.

== Early life and education ==
Panolong was born on January 9, 1968, in Malaysia.

She studied at the University of the Philippines Diliman where she graduated in 1989 with a Bachelor of Arts degree Major in Political Science and earned academic units in 1990-91 for a master's degree in International Studies.

== Career ==
Panolong's career in the Philippine Foreign Service began when she served as a contractual clerk at the Office of Cultural Affairs and Public Information Services in the Home Office beginning in 1992. Up until 1995, she worked at various offices in the Philippine Department of Foreign Affairs including as a clerk in the Office of the Undersecretary for International Economic Relations, as a foreign service officer at the Foreign Service Institute and as the assistant director of the Passport Division.

Her first overseas post was at the Philippine Embassy in Islamabad, Pakistan where she served as the third secretary and vice consul from 1995 to 1996. She then worked as a consul in the Philippine Consulate General in Jeddah from 1996 to 2001 where she handled Assistance-to-Nationals issues.

From 2001 to 2003, Panolong was recalled to the Home Office where she served as the director for North Africa Division in the Office of Middle East and African Affairs. She then became the first secretary and consul of the Philippine Embassy in Manama, Bahrain from 2003 to 2006, and deputy consul general of the Philippine Consulate General in Toronto, Canada from 2006 to 2009.

She returned to the Philippines in 2009 to serve again in the Office of Middle East and African Affairs but this time as the director for Middle East Division. In 2011, Panolong was posted to the Philippine Embassy in Jakarta, Indonesia as its deputy chief of mission and consul general. She was then posted to the Philippine Consulate General in Los Angeles, California where she served as its deputy consul general from 2014 to August 2015.

In September 2015, Panolong was appointed to the Philippine Consulate General in Jeddah, Saudi Arabia to serve as its consul general. She was the first Filipina to serve in that position and the first Asian woman to become a consul general in Saudi Arabia. She received her exequatur from the Saudi Ministry of Foreign Affairs on September 7, 2015. During her time as consul general, Panolong facilitated the repatriation of at least 683 overseas Filipino workers from Saudi Oger, which closed down in 2017, and Saudi Binladin Group. As her consulate's jurisdiction includes Mecca, Panolong was also responsible for the wellbeing of Muslim Filipinos joining the annual Hajj.

On March 25, 2017, she was designated as the chargé d'affaires of the Philippine embassy in Riyadh. Her term as chargé d'affaires saw the first state visit of a Philippine president to Saudi Arabia in eight years. She was among those that greeted President Rodrigo Duterte upon his arrival at the King Khalid International Airport and accompanied him, along with senior government officials, during his courtesy call to King Salman of Saudi Arabia.

In 2018, she became an assistant secretary of foreign affairs and also the chairperson of the agency's Bids and Awards Committee.

=== Ambassador to Oman ===
In February 2020, Duterte nominated Panolong to be the Philippine Ambassador to Oman, succeeding outgoing Ambassador Narciso Castañeda. She was confirmed by the Commission on Appointments on March 4, 2020. She arrived in Muscat on August 16, 2020, and on November 8, she presented her credentials to Sultan Haitham bin Tarik. She is the seventh and first female Philippine Ambassador to Oman. At the time of her appointment, Oman accommodated around 45,000 Filipinos, the fourth largest expatriate population in the country with the numbers steadily increasing before the COVID-19 pandemic.

== Personal life ==
Imelda Panolong is married to Jamel Panolong and they have three sons being Mohammad, Mohsen, and Mohaisen Panolong.
