= List of ambassadors of the Philippines to Lebanon =

Ambassador of the Republic of the Philippines to the Republic of Lebanon
- Sugo ng Republika ng Pilipinas sa Lebanon سفير جمهورية الفلبين لدى الجمهورية اللبنانية; Ambassadeur de la République des Philippines auprès de la République du Liban
- Seal of the Department of Foreign Affairs of the Philippines
- Incumbent; Raymond R. Balatbat since June 9, 2021
- Department of Foreign Affairs; Embassy of the Philippines, Beirut
- Style: His/Her Excellency
- Reports to: Department of Foreign Affairs
- Seat: Beirut, Lebanon
- Nominator: President of the Philippines
- Appointer: President of the Philippines; with the advice and consent of the Commission on Appointments
- Term length: No fixed term
- Inaugural holder: Paul Awad (honorary consul); Fortunato D. Oblena (ambassador)
- Formation: 1955 (honorary consul); October 24, 1996 (ambassador)
- Final holder: Nabil Sinno (honorary consul)
- Website: Embassy of the Philippines, Beirut

The ambassador of the Republic of the Philippines to Lebanon (Filipino: Sugo ng Pilipinas sa Lebanon; Arabic: سفير جمهورية الفلبين لدى الجمهورية اللبنانية : safir jumhuriat alfilibiyn ladaa aljumhuriat allubnania; French: Ambassadeur de la République des Philippines auprès de la République du Liban) is the Republic of the Philippines' foremost diplomatic representative in the Republic of Lebanon. As head of the Philippines' diplomatic mission there, the ambassador is the official representative of the president and the government of the Philippines to the president and government of Lebanon. The position has the rank and status of an ambassador extraordinary and plenipotentiary.

== List of representatives ==
=== Honorary consuls and consuls-general ===
Head of mission	Tenure	Note(s)
Paul Awad	1955−1975	
Ghaith Khoury	1975−1984	
Nicolas Baida	1984−1992	
Nabil Sinno	1989−1996	

=== Ambassadors ===
Head of mission	Tenure	Note(s)
Fortunato D. Oblena	1996−2003	He previously served as the ambassador to the United Arab Emirates from 1989 to 1994.
Ramoncito S. Mariño	2003−2004	
Al Francis C. Bichara	February − December 2006	
Gilberto G.B. Asuque	2009−2011	
Leah M. Basinang-Ruiz	2011−2016	
Bernardita Catalla	2017−2020	Credentials were presented on January 4, 2018. Died in office on April 2, 2020, due to COVID-19.
Raymond R. Balatbat	2021−present	Credentials were presented on June 9, 2021.

== See also ==
- List of diplomatic missions of the Philippines
