= Embassy of the Philippines, Beirut =

Diplomatic mission in Lebanon

Embassy of the Philippines, Beirut Pasuguan ng Pilipinas sa Beirut سفارة الفلبين في بيروت Ambassade des Philippines au Beyrouth

- Location: Beirut
- Address: W Building, Rue Mar Geries, Hadeth, Baabda District, Mount Lebanon Governorate
- Coordinates: 33°50′34.2″N 35°32′03.9″E
- Ambassador: Raymond R. Balatbat
- Website: http://beirutpe.dfa.gov.ph

The Embassy of the Philippines in Beirut is the diplomatic mission of the Republic of the Philippines to the Republic of Lebanon. Opened in 1996, it is currently located at the W Building on Rue Mar Geries in the southern Beirut suburb of Hadeth, part of the Baabda District in the Mount Lebanon Governorate.

== History ==
Although the Philippines and Lebanon established diplomatic relations in 1946, the Philippines did not establish an embassy in Lebanon until November 1996, with Fortunato Oblena becoming the country's first resident ambassador. Prior to the establishment of the embassy, the Philippines conducted diplomatic relations with Lebanon through an honorary consulate in Beirut which, at various points in its history, was accredited to the Philippine Embassy in Cairo, and subsequently the Philippine Embassy in Amman.

Initially located at Raouché in Ras Beirut, the embassy moved to a larger space in Achrafieh in 2006, enabling it to consolidate consular and labor functions under one roof. In 2012, it moved to its current location outside the city: a new building which also enables it to host larger events.

Between 1996 and 2008, the embassy also exercised jurisdiction over Syria, until a separate embassy was established in Damascus which formally opened on April 17, 2009.

== Staff and activities ==
The Philippine Embassy in Beirut is headed by Ambassador Raymond R. Balatbat, who was appointed to the position by President Rodrigo Duterte on December 3, 2020. Prior to his current post, Balatbat, a career diplomat who has served with the Philippine foreign service since 1997, served as the Executive Director of the Office of Middle East and Africa Affairs at the Department of Foreign Affairs (DFA), and prior to that served at Philippine diplomatic missions throughout the Islamic world, including at the embassies in Bandar Seri Begawan and Jakarta. His appointment was confirmed by the Commission on Appointments on December 16, 2020, and he presented his credentials to President Michel Aoun on June 9, 2021.

A notable diplomat who served at the embassy was Bernardita Catalla, who served as ambassador between 2018 and 2020. Known for championing the welfare of Overseas Filipino Workers (OFWs) throughout her career, Catalla died while in office on April 2, 2020 due to COVID-19 amidst a pandemic of the disease.

The embassy's activities center around providing to the many OFWs in Lebanon, which began on November 7, 2000 with the opening of a Filipino Workers’ Resource Center to help provide legal aid to OFWs in the country. The treatment of OFWs in Lebanon is a regular point of contention for the embassy and for the DFA in general: in 2005, it protested a raid in Beirut conducted by the Lebanese government against OFWs despite them being legally documented, while in 2011, it went so far as to encourage people to not go to the country for work. In 2017, in one of Catalla's first acts as ambassador, the registration of Filipinos in Lebanon was swiftly resumed after it was discovered that the embassy had not been keeping track of how many Filipinos were in the country — by the following year, more than 12,000 OFWs were registered and given registration cards. The embassy has also facilitated the repatriation of Filipinos affected by war and other conflicts in Lebanon, which it did in 2006, and in 2019, which Catalla personally led. This has also extended to facilitating the evacuation of Filipinos from Syria as a result of that country's civil war.

The embassy also engages in promoting Filipino culture in Lebanon, as well as promoting cultural links and exchanges between the two countries. These include hosting a screening of the 2002 film Kailangan Kita in 2013, organizing Lebanon's first-ever exhibition of Filipino art — primarily the works of Marvin Baldemor, son of Manuel Baldemor — the following year, and presenting the Filipino translation of The Prophet by Kahlil Gibran, prepared by Ruth Elynia Mabanglo, to his eponymous museum in 2018.

== See also ==
- List of diplomatic missions of the Philippines
