= Embassy of the Philippines, Damascus =

Diplomatic mission of the Philippines in Syria

Embassy of the Philippines, Damascus Pasuguan ng Pilipinas sa Damasko سفارة الفلبين في دمشق

- Location: Damascus
- Address: 56 Hamza bin Abdul Muttalib Street, Western Villas, Mezzeh
- Coordinates: 33°29′49.5″N 36°14′0.5″E
- Chargé d'affaires: Ferdinand P. Flores
- Website: https://damascuspe.dfa.gov.ph/

The Embassy of the Philippines in Damascus is the diplomatic mission of the Republic of the Philippines to the Syrian Arab Republic. Opened in 2009, it is located in the Western Villas district of the Mezzeh municipality in southwestern Damascus, near the People's Palace.

== History ==
Although the Philippines and Syria established diplomatic relations in 1946, the Philippines did not establish an embassy in the country until much later, with diplomatic relations initially being conducted through the Philippine Embassy in Cairo. In 1960, while Syria was part of the United Arab Republic (UAR), retired colonel Pullong Arpa of Sulu was appointed by President Carlos P. Garcia as the first Philippine ambassador to the country.

Although Syria left the UAR the following year as a result of the 1961 Syrian coup d'état, the Cairo mission continued to exercise jurisdiction over the country. Jurisdiction over Syria later passed to the Philippine Embassy in Amman, and following that the Philippine Embassy in Beirut when it opened in 1996, with an honorary consulate in Damascus serving the country.

A resident mission in Syria was not opened until the presidency of Gloria Macapagal Arroyo, when the Embassy was formally opened on April 17, 2009 to serve the country's then-growing Filipino community. Following the closure of the honorary consulate in Damascus, one was opened in Aleppo, Syria's second-largest city.

== Staff and activities ==
As of 2023, the Philippine Embassy in Damascus is provisionally headed by a chargé d'affaires, pending the appointment of a new ambassador by the Philippine government. The current chargé d'affaires is John G. Reyes, while the last (and so far, only) resident ambassador was Wilfredo R. Cuyugan, who was appointed to the position by President Arroyo. A career diplomat, his appointment was confirmed by the Commission on Appointments on June 11, 2008, and he assumed his position with the mission's opening the following year.

Many of the Embassy's activities center around evacuating Filipinos fleeing the Syrian civil war, with over 4,500 Filipinos being repatriated by 2013, and an activity it coordinates with the embassy in Beirut. While most Filipinos have been evacuated, some still remain in the country and the Embassy occasionally reminds those who have remained that repatriation is still available to them, in addition to staying safe and indoors. Aside from repatriation, the Embassy participates in a number of cultural activities, like promoting Philippine products at an international bazaar, and holding an art exhibition and art therapy session for World Mental Health Day.

On January 24, 2021, The Washington Post broke a story accusing Embassy officials of mistreating and abusing female Overseas Filipino Workers (OFWs), many of whom were trafficked into the country illegally, who were in their care. OFWs who sought shelter at the Embassy have since been repatriated back to the Philippines, with the first group of OFWs arriving into the country just two weeks after the Washington Post story broke, and the last group arriving in the Philippines on June 24, 2021. The DFA also opened an investigation into the conduct of Embassy staff soon after the story's publication.

=== Appointment of a new ambassador ===
Appointing a new Philippine ambassador to Syria has likewise been complicated by the Syrian civil war, as well as controversies within the Philippine diplomatic service.

On August 30, 2011, after Arroyo was succeeded as president by Benigno Aquino III, Cuyugan was controversially recalled by the Department of Foreign Affairs (DFA) and replaced with chargé d'affaires Ricardo Endaya. DFA spokesperson Raul Hernandez disclosed to the media that because the mission's focus has shifted to evacuating Filipinos from Syria, Cuyugan was replaced by Foreign Affairs Secretary Albert del Rosario with a diplomat with more experience in repatriation, although the DFA was also reportedly incensed by Cuyugan's position that Filipinos in Syria were safe despite the deteriorating security situation there, reinforced by a statement he made to the media to that effect. Some Filipino community leaders in Syria questioned the timing of Cuyugan's recall and asserted that his position was not wrong but that they will nonetheless work with the mission's new leadership, while others lauded the move, accusing Cuyugan of making those statements but not leaving the Embassy compound to assess the situation on the ground.

Aquino would later appoint Nestor N. Padalhin, who formerly served as ambassador to Nigeria, as ambassador to Syria on March 9, 2012. However, Padalhin's appointment was derailed after he had failed to disclose his ownership of a three-bedroom condominium in Seattle in his Statement of Assets, Liabilities, and Net Worth (SALN), a day after a similar SALN issue led to the successful impeachment of Chief Justice Renato Corona. He was nonetheless still appointed to head the Embassy, but instead as chargé d'affaires en pied, until the end of Aquino's term, when Padalhin was then replaced by Alex V. Lamadrid after Aquino was succeeded by Rodrigo Duterte as president. Lamadrid was subsequently recalled by the DFA after the Washington Post story broke, with the OFWs in question accusing him of ignoring their plight while, as they recalled to columnist Ramon Tulfo, "holding parties for his handsome Syrian friends". Lamadrid was then replaced as chargé d'affaires by Vida Soraya S. Verzosa, a human rights lawyer who was first deployed to Syria on December 20, 2020, and who served in this capacity until January 27, 2023, when she was succeeded by Reyes as chargé d'affaires en pied. Reyes served as chargé d'affaires en pied until 2026, when he was succeeded by Ferdinand P. Flores.

== See also ==
- List of diplomatic missions of the Philippines
- List of diplomatic missions in Syria
