= List of ambassadors of the Philippines to the Czech Republic =

List of ambassadors

Ambassador of the Republic of the Philippines to the Czech Republic
- Sugo ng Republika ng Pilipinas sa Republikang Tseko; Vyslanci Filipínské republiky v České republice
- Seal of the Department of Foreign Affairs of the Philippines
- Incumbent; Eduardo Martin R. Meñez since 18 February 2023
- Department of Foreign Affairs; Embassy of the Philippines, Prague
- Style: His Excellency
- Reports to: Department of Foreign Affairs
- Seat: Prague, Czech Republic
- Nominator: Secretary of Foreign Affairs
- Appointer: President of the Philippines; with the advice and consent of the Commission on Appointments
- Term length: No fixed term
- Inaugural holder: Carmelita R. Salas
- Formation: 11 March 1997
- Website: Philippine Embassy, Prague

The ambassador of the Republic of the Philippines to the Czech Republic (Filipino: Sugo ng Republika ng Pilipinas sa Republikang Tseko; Czech: Vyslanci Filipínské republiky v České republice) is the Republic of the Philippines' foremost diplomatic representative in the Czech Republic. As head of the Philippines' diplomatic mission there, the ambassador is the official representative of the president and the government of the Philippines to the president and government of the Czech Republic. The position has the rank and status of an ambassador extraordinary and plenipotentiary and is based at the embassy located in Prague, the capital of the country.

== Representatives ==
| Head of mission | Tenure | Note(s) |
|---|---|---|
| Carmelita R. Salas | 11 March 1997 – November 2008 | Credentials were presented to President Václav Havel on 11 March 1997. |
| Regina Irene P. Sarmiento | 18 March 2009 – 30 September 2010 | Credentials were presented to Václav Klaus on 18 March 2009. |
| Evelyn D. Austria-Garcia | 11 April 2011 – 28 July 2013 | Credentials were presented to Václav Klaus on 11 April 2011. |
| Victoriano M. Lecaros | 28 January 2014 – 6 November 2016 | Appointed by President Benigno Aquino III on 26 July 2013 and it was confirmed by the Commission of Appointments on 4 September 2013. Credentials were presented to Miloš Zeman on 28 January 2014. |
| Ombra T. Jainal | 22 August 2018 – 30 June 2022 | Appointed by President Rodrigo Duterte on 24 January 2018 and confirmed by the Commission on Appointments on 21 February 2018, and credentials were presented to Miloš Zeman on 22 August 2018. |
| Eduardo Martin R. Meñez | 18 February 2023 – present | Appointed by President Bongbong Marcos on 1 September 2022 and confirmed by the Commission of Appointments twenty-seven days later. Credentials were presented to Petr Pavel on 4 April 2023. |
Source: Embassy of the Republic of the Philippines, Prague

== See also ==
- List of ambassadors of the Czech Republic to the Philippines
