= List of ambassadors of the Philippines to Iran =

Ambassador of the Republic of the Philippines to the Islamic Republic of Iran
- Sugo ng Republika ng Pilipinas sa Republikang Islamiko ng Iran سفیر جمهوری فیلیپین در جمهوری اسلامی ایران (Persian); Sefir Jamehori Filipin dar Jomhuri-ye Eslâmi-ye Irân
- Seal of the Department of Foreign Affairs of the Philippines
- Incumbent; Roberto G. Manalo since June 7, 2023
- Department of Foreign Affairs; Embassy of the Philippines, Tehran
- Style: His Excellency
- Reports to: Department of Foreign Affairs
- Seat: Tehran, Iran
- Nominator: Secretary of Foreign Affairs
- Appointer: President of the Philippines; with the advice and consent of the Commission on Appointments
- Term length: No fixed term
- Inaugural holder: Juan A. Ona
- Formation: August 16, 1974
- Website: Philippine Embassy, Tehran

The ambassador of the Republic of the Philippines to the Islamic Republic of Iran (Filipino: Sugo ng Republika ng Pilipinas sa Republikang Islamiko ng Iran; Persian: سفیر جمهوری فیلیپین در جمهوری اسلامی ایران, romanized: Sefir Jamehori Filipin dar Jomhuri-ye Eslâmi-ye Irân) is the Republic of the Philippines' foremost diplomatic representative in the Islamic Republic of Iran. As head of the Philippines' diplomatic mission there, the ambassador is the official representative of the president and the government of the Philippines to the supreme leader and government of the Islamic Republic of Iran. The position has the rank and status of an ambassador extraordinary and plenipotentiary and is based at the embassy in Tehran, Iran.

== List of heads of mission ==
=== Ambassadors Extraordinary and Plenipotentiary ===
Ambassadors	Tenure	Note(s)
Rafael M. Ileto	16 July 1975 – November 1979	
Surotani P. Usoda	30 August 1987 – 30 April 1993	
Oscar G. Valenzuela	26 June 1993 – June 1996	
Haron P. Alonto	11 August 1996 – 12 January 1999	
Ernesto V. Llamas	9 June 1999 – 11 July 2002	
Rodrigo S.A Aragon	16 September 2002 – 6 August 2005	
Aladin G. Villacorte	10 June 2007 – 30 November 2009	
Generoso S. Senga	24 February 2009 – 28 June 2010	
Eduardo Martin R. Meñez	4 September 2013 – 21 November 2016	
Wilfredo C. Santos	17 May 2017 – 31 August 2021	
Roberto G. Manalo	7 June 2023 – present	Credentials were presented on 7 June 2023.
Source: Embassy of the Philippines, Tehran

=== Chargé d’Affaires (ad interim) ===
Chargé d'Affaires	Tenure	Note(s)
Juan A. Ona	16 August 1974 – 15 July 1975	
Ronald B. Allarey	4 December 1979 – 4 January 1982	
Fortunato D. Oblena	2 January 1982 – 16 April 1983	
Magdara B. Dimaampao	12 April 1983 – 16 April 1986	
Oscar G. Orcine	17 April 1986 – August 1987	
Dauday Tago	January 1999 – June 1999	
Renato Duenas	7 August 2005 – 30 May 2006	
Laureano C. Santiago	31 May 2006 – 9 June 2007	
Mariano A. Dumia	29 June 2010 – 21 November 2012	
Eduardo Martin R. Meñez	26 April 2013 – 4 September 2013	
Wilfredo C. Santos	20 January 2017 – 17 May 2017	
Hannah Eloisse V. Go	1 September 2021 – 17 March 2022	
Roberto G. Manalo	18 March 2022 – June 2023	
Source: Embassy of the Philippines, Tehran
