= List of ambassadors of Austria to the Philippines =

Ambassador of the Republic of Austria to the Republic of the Philippines
- Sugo ng Republika ng Austria sa Republika ng Pilipinas; Botschafter der Republik Österreich in der Republik der Philippinen
- Coat of arms of Austria
- Incumbent; Johann Brieger since August 25, 2022
- Ministry of Foreign Affairs; Embassy of Austria, Manila
- Style: His Excellency
- Seat: Taguig, Metro Manila
- Inaugural holder: Herbert Kröll
- Formation: 1979
- Website: Austrian Embassy, Manila

The ambassador of the Republic of Austria to the Republic of the Philippines is the Republic of Austria's foremost diplomatic representative in the Republic of the Philippines. As head of Austria's diplomatic mission there, the ambassador is the official representative of the president and government of Austria to the president and the government of the Philippines. The position has the rank and status of an ambassador extraordinary and plenipotentiary and the embassy is located on the 8th floor of One Orion Building, 11th Avenue corner 38th Street, Bonifacio Global City, Taguig, Metro Manila.

Although the diplomatic relations between the two countries were established on October 17, 1946, the Austrian ambassador to Indonesia served as the non-resident ambassador to the country until 1979. This diplomatic post serves as the non-resident ambassador to Palau.

== Austrian ambassadors ==
| Name | Tenure | Appointed during the administration of | Accredited during the administration of | Notes | References |
|---|---|---|---|---|---|
| Herbert Kröll | 1979–1982 | Bruno Kreisky | Ferdinand E. Marcos Sr. | Chargé d'affaires | |
| Friedrich Posch | 1982–1986 | Bruno Kreisky | Ferdinand E. Marcos Sr. | | |
| Otmar Koler | 1986–1990 | Fred Sinowatz | Corazon C. Aquino | Conferred the Order of Sikatuna on August 13, 1990. | |
| Günter Gallowitsch | 1990–1994 | Franz Vranitzky | Corazon C. Aquino | Conferred the Order of Sikatuna on October 26, 1994. | |
| Heide Keller | 1994–1995 | Franz Vranitzky | Fidel V. Ramos | | |
| Wolfgang Jilly | 1996–2001 | Franz Vranitzky | Fidel V. Ramos | Conferred the Order of Sikatuna on March 16, 2001. | |
| Krepela | 2001–2005 | Wolfgang Schüssel | Gloria Macapagal-Arroyo | | |
| Herbert Jäger | 2005–2009 | Wolfgang Schüssel | Gloria Macapagal-Arroyo | | |
| Wilhelm Donko | 2009–2013 | Werner Faymann | Gloria Macapagal-Arroyo | | |
| Josef Müllner | 2013–2017 | Werner Faymann | Benigno S. Aquino III | | |
| Bita Rasoulian | 2017–2022 | Werner Faymann | Rodrigo Duterte | Presentation of credentials on August 7, 2017. | |
| Johann Brieger | August 25, 2022–present | Karl Nehammer | Ferdinand R. Marcos Jr. | Appointed under the decision of the Austrian government on December 15, 2021. Presentation of credentials on October 11, 2022. | |

== See also ==
- Foreign relations of Austria
- Foreign relations of the Philippines
- List of ambassadors of the Philippines to Austria
