= List of ambassadors of the Philippines to the United Arab Emirates =

Ambassador of the Republic of the Philippines to the United Arab Emirates
- Sugo ng Republika ng Pilipinas sa Emiratos Arabes Unidos سفير جمهورية الفلبين لدى دولة الإمارات العربية المتحدة
- Seal of the Department of Foreign Affairs of the Philippines
- Incumbent; Alfonso Ferdinand A. Ver since January 20, 2023
- Department of Foreign Affairs; Embassy of the Philippines, Abu Dhabi
- Style: Her Excellency
- Reports to: Department of Foreign Affairs
- Seat: Abu Dhabi, United Arab Emirates
- Nominator: Secretary of Foreign Affairs
- Appointer: President of the Philippines; with the advice and consent of the Commission on Appointments
- Term length: No fixed term
- Inaugural holder: Alberto A. Encomienda
- Formation: June 17, 1980
- Website: Official website of the Embassy of the Philippines, Abu Dhabi

The ambassador of the Republic of the Philippines to the United Arab Emirates (Filipino: Sugo ng Republika ng Pilipinas sa Emiratos Arabes Unidos; Arabic: سفير جمهورية الفلبين لدى دولة الإمارات العربية المتحدة : safir jumhuriat alfilibiyn ladaa dawlat al'iimarat alearabiat almutahida) is the Republic of the Philippines' foremost diplomatic representative in the United Arab Emirates. As head of the Philippines' diplomatic mission there, the ambassador is the official representative of the president and the government of the Philippines to the president and government of the United Arab Emirates. The position has the rank and status of an ambassador extraordinary and plenipotentiary and is based at the embassy located in Abu Dhabi.

Although the diplomatic relations between the two countries were established on August 19, 1974, this diplomatic post was formed on June 17, 1980.

== List of heads of mission ==
Head of mission	Tenure	Remark(s)
Alberto A. Encomienda	1980–1983	Chargé d’ Affaires
Antonio L. Ramirez	1983–1986	Minister plenipotentiary
Isabelo J. Astraquillo	1986–1989	First resident Philippine ambassador to the United Arab Emirates.
Fortunato D. Oblena	1989–1994	
Roy V. Señeres	1994–1998	
Amable R. Aguiluz III	1998–2003	
Libran N. Cabactulan	2003–2009	
Grace Relucio Princesa	2009–2015	
Constancio R. Vingno Jr.	2015–2018	
Hjayceelyn M. Quintana	2018–2022	Credentials were presented on November 17, 2018.
Alfonso Ferdinand A. Ver	2023–present	Credentials were presented on January 26, 2023.
Source: Embassy of the Republic of the Philippines, Abu Dhabi
