= Embassy of the Philippines, Prague =

Diplomatic mission of the Philippines in the Czech Republic

Embassy of the Philippines, Prague Pasuguan ng Pilipinas sa Praga Velvyslanectví Filipínské Republiky v Praze

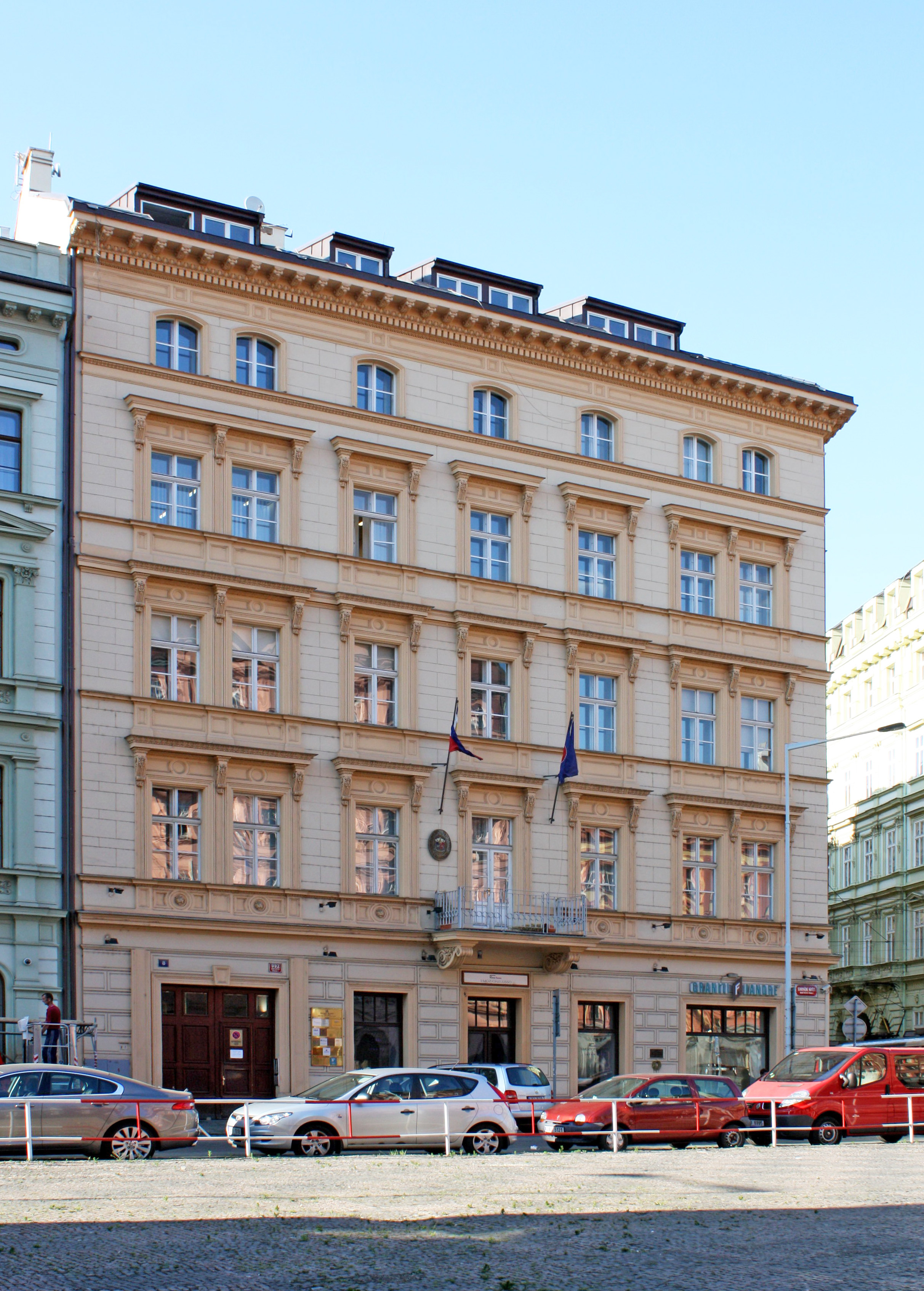
- Location: Prague
- Address: Senovážné náměstí 8
- Coordinates: 50°5′9.9″N 14°25′54.2″E
- Ambassador: Eduardo Martin R. Meñez
- Website: praguepe.dfa.gov.ph

The Embassy of the Philippines in Prague (Czech: Velvyslanectví Filipínské Republiky v Praze) is the diplomatic mission of the Republic of the Philippines to the Czech Republic. Opened in 1997, it is located in the New Town quarter of central Prague, near the Jubilee Synagogue and the city's main railway station.

== History ==
Diplomatic relations between the Philippines and Czechoslovakia were established on October 5, 1973, part of a broader push during the presidency of Ferdinand Marcos to normalize relations between the Philippines and the Eastern Bloc, although the Philippines did not immediately open a resident mission in the country. Diplomatic relations between the two countries were originally conducted via the Philippine Embassy in Bern, with Rolando Garcia becoming the Philippines' first non-resident ambassador to Czechoslovakia, although a resident trade office was reportedly opened in 1979. Jurisdiction over Czechoslovakia later passed to the Philippine Embassy in East Berlin.

With the Velvet Revolution and the subsequent dissolution of Czechoslovakia, relations between both the Czech Republic and Slovakia would later be conducted through the Philippine Embassy in Budapest. By 1995, President Fidel V. Ramos promised his Czech counterpart, Václav Havel, during his state visit to the Philippines that a resident embassy in Prague would be opened during his administration, leading to the establishment of the present-day embassy two years later with Carmelita R. Salas serving as the country's first resident ambassador to the Czech Republic. Jurisdiction over Slovakia, however, would later pass to the Philippine Embassy in Vienna.

== Staff and activities ==
The Philippine Embassy in Prague is headed by Ambassador Eduardo Martin R. Meñez, who was appointed to the position by President Bongbong Marcos on September 1, 2022. Prior to his appointment as ambassador, Meñez, a career diplomat, was Assistant Secretary at the Office of Public and Cultural Diplomacy of the Department of Foreign Affairs. His appointment was confirmed by the Commission on Appointments on September 28, 2022, and he presented his credentials to Czech President Petr Pavel on April 4, 2023, the first ambassador to do so during his presidency.

Many of the embassy's activities are connected to deepening and strengthening the existing cultural and economic ties between the Philippines and the Czech Republic. Among its activities include inviting Czech businesses to invest in the Philippines, hosting an exhibition of Philippine art and culture, and promoting the Philippines as a tourist destination. Some of these activities are even directly related to the historical connection José Rizal and other prominent Filipinos of his generation had to the country, such as facilitating the discovery of several documents, including correspondence between Rizal and his friend Ferdinand Blumentritt and a number of sketches by Juan Luna, at a museum in České Budějovice.

In addition to these activities, in recent years the embassy has had to increasingly focus on overseeing the welfare of the growing number of Overseas Filipino Workers working in the Czech Republic, which led to it expanding to include a labor attaché.

== See also ==
- Czech Republic–Philippines relations
- List of diplomatic missions of the Philippines
