= Palestine–Syria relations =

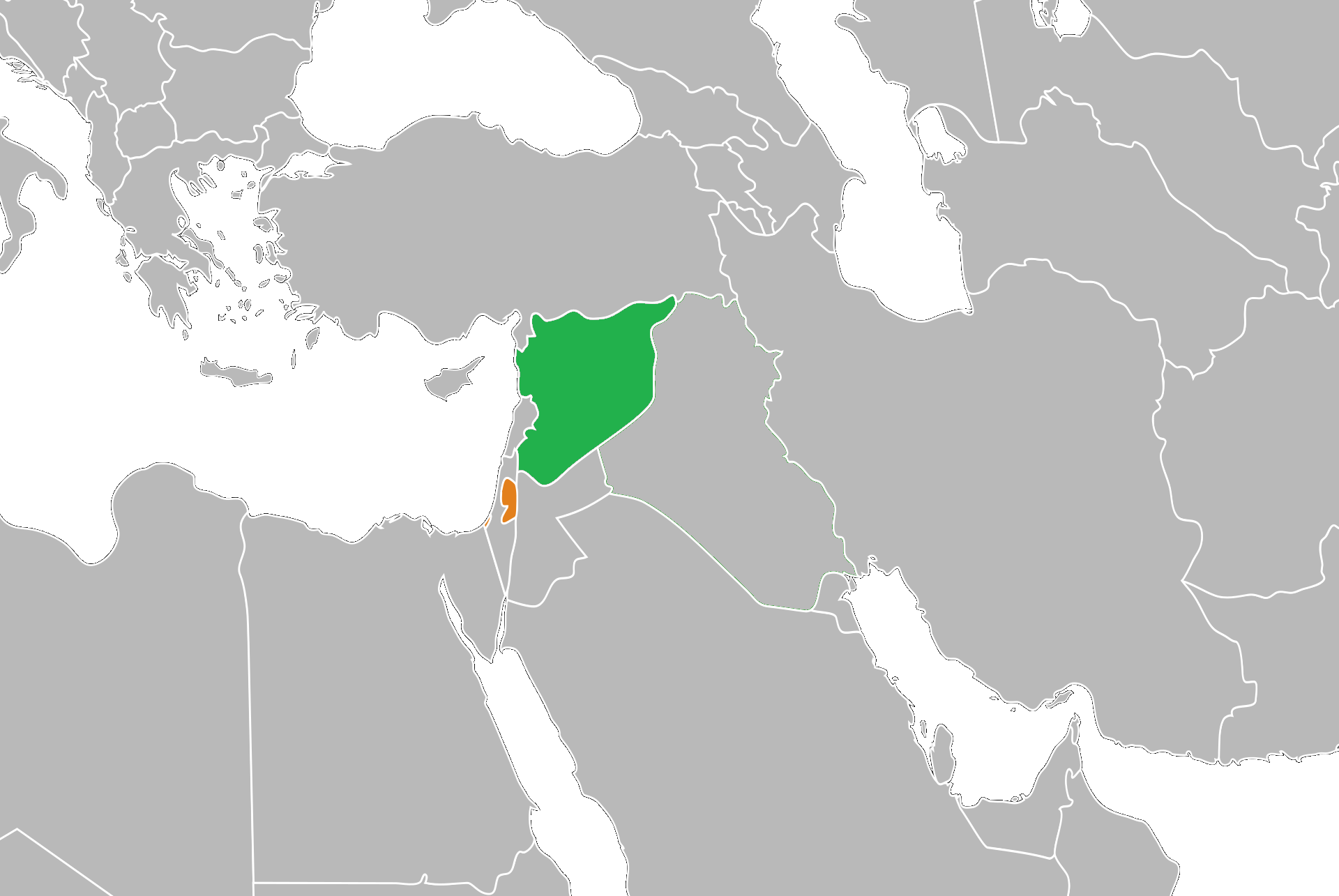

- Palestine: Syria

Diplomatic mission
- None: Embassy of Palestine, Damascus

Envoy
- None: Samir al-Rifai

Palestine–Syria relations refers to the official bilateral relations between Palestine and Syria. Palestine has an embassy in Damascus, but Syria has no official representative office in Palestine.

== History ==
=== Mandate era ===
During the early 20th century, Syria and Palestine were carved up and divided between the French Empire and the British Empire, with the French Mandate for Syria and the British Mandate for Palestine respectively.

=== Since independence ===
After the outbreak of the 1948 Arab–Israeli War, Syria sent troops to fight against the Israel Defense Forces. However, the influx of Palestinian refugees into Syria complicated the relationship. During the Six-Day War, Syria again helped Palestine, but Arab states' failure hurt Syria's reputation and created mistrust between the two countries.

Syrian leader Hafez al-Assad was a Ba'athist, and was known for his hostility towards Palestinian leaders such as Yasser Arafat and Faisal Husseini, with attempts to divide the Palestinian leadership.

=== Syrian civil war ===
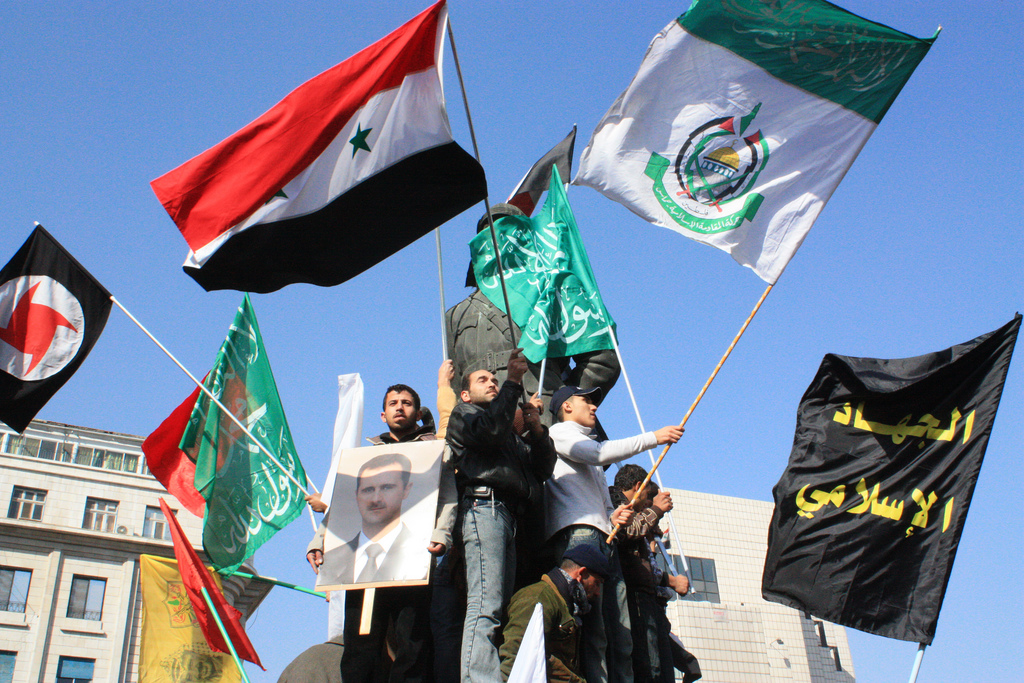
Pro-Assad demonstrators in Syria holding flags of Ba'athist Syria along with other members of the Axis of Resistance, including the Palestinian group Hamas.

The Syrian civil war left the Palestinians divided over the Assad regime. Some Palestinians were supportive of Bashar Assad because of his pro-Palestinian rhetoric, such as calling Palestinian armed groups as "freedom fighters" and Israelis as "state terrorists". As a result, some Palestinians joined pro-Assad armed groups that fought against the Syrian opposition and Israel.

On the other hand, some Palestinian leaders endorsed the Syrian Revolution against Assad in 2011 and left their Syrian headquarters in Damascus in 2012. They view the Assad regime more negatively for a "secret relationship" with Israel and the regime's actions against the Palestinian people in Syria. This included enabling the torture and murder of Palestinians, and later the demolition of Palestinian refugee camps in Syria, notably Yarmouk. Assad was further accused of allowing rape and torture of Palestinian detainees. At the same time, Syrian rebels were also documented to have committed abuses against Palestinians in Syria. One such example comes from the beheading of a Palestinian boy in Aleppo in 2016 by Syrian rebels.

=== Post-Assad relations ===
On 18 April 2025, Palestinian President Mahmoud Abbas met with Syrian President Ahmed al-Sharaa in Damascus, his first visit to Syria since 2007. They discussed strengthening bilateral ties and regional developments, including Gaza and the two-state solution, and agreed to form joint committees for cooperation. However, on 22 April 2025, after demands from the United States, Syrian president Ahmed al-Sharaa ordered the arrest of two leaders of the Palestinian Islamic Jihad in Syria and stated that Syria would seek the dismantlement of all armed Palestinian groups in Syria.

== Palestinians in Syria ==
In 1948, an estimated 85,000 Palestinians fled to Syria during the 1948 Palestine war, primarily from the cities of Safed, Haifa, and Jaffa. By 2011 with the outbreak of the Syrian civil war, this figure was estimated to be around 500,000.

== See also ==
- Palestinians in Syria
- Syria Palaestina
- Embassy of the State of Palestine in Syria
- Foreign relations of Palestine
- Foreign relations of Syria
