= List of ambassadors of the Philippines to Austria =

Ambassador of the Republic of the Philippines to the Republic of Austria
- Sugo ng Republika ng Pilipinas sa Republika ng Austria; Botschafter der Republik der Philippinen in der Republik Österreich
- Seal of the Department of Foreign Affairs of the Philippines
- Incumbent; Evangelina Lourdes A. Bernas since June 20, 2023
- Department of Foreign Affairs; Embassy of the Philippines, Vienna
- Style: Her Excellency
- Reports to: Department of Foreign Affairs
- Seat: Vienna, Austria
- Nominator: Secretary of Foreign Affairs
- Appointer: President of the Philippines; with the advice and consent of the Commission on Appointments
- Term length: No fixed term
- Inaugural holder: Domingo Siazon Jr.
- Formation: 1973
- Website: Philippine Embassy, Vienna

The ambassador of the Republic of the Philippines to the Republic of Austria (Filipino: Sugo ng Republika ng Pilipinas sa Republika ng Austria; German: Botschafter der Republik der Philippinen in der Republik Österreich) is the Republic of the Philippines' foremost diplomatic representative in the Republic of Austria. As head of the Philippines' diplomatic mission there, the ambassador is the official representative of the president and the government of the Philippines to the president and government of Austria. The position has the rank and status of an ambassador extraordinary and plenipotentiary and is based at the embassy located in Vienna.

Although the diplomatic relations between the two countries were established on October 17, 1946, this diplomatic post and the embassy were established in 1973.

== List of heads of mission ==
Head of mission	Tenure	Note(s)	Reference(s)
Domingo Siazon Jr.	1973 – 1986	Chargé d'Affaires (1973–79) and first resident ambassador of the Philippines to Austria (1980–86)	
Nelson D. Lavinia	1986 – 1992		
Reynaldo O. Arcilla	1993 – 1995		
Jose Abeto Zaide Jr.	1995 – 1999		
Victor G. Garcia III	1999 – 2006		
Linglingay F. Lacanlale	2006 – 2010		
Lourdes O. Yparraguirre	2010 – 2015		
Maria Zeneida Collinson	April 30, 2015 – 2017		
Maria Cleofe R. Natividad	January 8, 2018 – 2023	Presentation of credentials on January 8, 2018 (Austria), September 7, 2018 (Croatia), and February 13, 2019 (Slovakia).	
Evangelina Lourdes A. Bernas	June 20, 2023 – present	Presentation of credentials on June 20, 2023 (Austria) and June 27, 2023 (Croatia).	
Source: Embassy of the Republic of the Philippines, Vienna

== See also ==
- Foreign relations of Austria
- Foreign relations of the Philippines
- List of ambassadors of Austria to the Philippines
