= List of ambassadors of the Philippines to the Netherlands =

Ambassador of the Republic of the Philippines to the Kingdom of the Netherlands
- Sugo ng Republika ng Pilipinas sa Kaharian ng Nederlandiya; Ambassadeur van de Republiek der Filipijnen in het Koninkrijk der Nederlanden
- Seal of the Department of Foreign Affairs of the Philippines
- Incumbent; Jose Eduardo E. Malaya III since 7 April 2021
- Department of Foreign Affairs; Embassy of the Philippines, The Hague
- Style: His Excellency
- Reports to: Department of Foreign Affairs
- Seat: The Hague, Netherlands
- Nominator: Secretary of Foreign Affairs
- Appointer: President of the Philippines; with the advice and consent of the Commission on Appointments
- Term length: No fixed term
- Inaugural holder: Nicanor A. Roxas
- Formation: 11 March 1959
- Website: Philippine Embassy, The Hague

The ambassador of the Republic of the Philippines to the Kingdom of the Netherlands (Filipino: Sugo ng Republika ng Pilipinas sa Kaharian ng Nederlandiya; Dutch: Ambassadeur van de Republiek der Filipijnen in het Koninkrijk der Nederlanden) is the Republic of the Philippines' foremost diplomatic representative in the Kingdom of the Netherlands. As officer of the Philippine Department of Foreign Affairs, the head of the embassy, and the head of the Philippines' diplomatic mission there, the ambassador is the official representative of the president and the government of the Philippines to the monarch and government of the Netherlands. The position has the rank and status of an ambassador extraordinary and plenipotentiary.

== Heads of mission ==
Head of mission	Tenure	Note(s)
Nicanor A. Roxas	1959 – 1962	Presented his credentials twice to Queen Juliana: 11 March 1959 (as envoy) and 27 May 1960 (as ambassador).
Librado D. Cayco	1962	
Eduardo T. Quintero	1964 – 1965	
Delfin R. Garcia	1965 – 1971	
Rogelio de la Rosa	1971 – 1978	
Jose V. Cruz	1978 – 1980	
Jose I. Plana	1984 – 1987	
Rosario V. Cariño	1987 – 1991	
Romeo A. Arguelles	1992 – 1994	First term.
Rodolfo Sanchez	1995 – 1999	
Eloy R. Bello III	1999 – 2002	
Romeo A. Arguelles	2002 – 2009	Second term.
Cardozo M. Luna	2009 – 2010	
Lourdes G. Morales	2011 – 2013	Appointed by Pres. Benigno S. Aquino III on 31 May 2011, and was later approved by the Commission of Appointments.
Jaime Victor B. Ledda	2014 – 2020	
Jose Eduardo E. Malaya III	7 April 2021 – present	Appointed by Pres. Rodrigo Duterte on 18 September 2020, and was later confirmed by the Commission of Appointments less than two months later. Credentials were presented to King Willem-Alexander on 7 April 2021.
Source: Embassy of the Republic of the Philippines, The Hague
