= List of ambassadors of the Philippines to Vietnam =

Ambassador of the Republic of the Philippines to the Socialist Republic of Vietnam
- Sugo ng Republika ng Pilipinas sa Republikang Sosyalista ng Vietnam; Đại sứ Cộng hòa Philippines tại Cộng hòa Xã hội Chủ nghĩa Việt Nam
- Seal of the Department of Foreign Affairs of the Philippines
- Incumbent; Francisco Noel R. Fernandez III since 6 February 2026
- Department of Foreign Affairs; Embassy of the Philippines, Hanoi
- Style: His Excellency
- Reports to: Department of Foreign Affairs
- Seat: Hanoi, Vietnam
- Nominator: Secretary of Foreign Affairs
- Appointer: President of the Philippines; with the advice and consent of the Commission on Appointments
- Term length: No fixed term
- Inaugural holder: Juan B. Cruz Jr.
- Formation: 21 September 1977
- Website: Philippine Embassy, Hanoi

The ambassador of the Republic of the Philippines to the Socialist Republic of Vietnam (Filipino: Sugo ng Republika ng Pilipinas sa Republikang Sosyalista ng Vietnam; Vietnamese: Đại sứ Cộng hòa Philippines tại Cộng hòa Xã hội Chủ nghĩa Việt Nam) is the Republic of the Philippines' foremost diplomatic representative in the Socialist Republic of Vietnam. As head of the Philippines' diplomatic mission there, the ambassador is the official representative of the president and the government of the Philippines to the president and government of Vietnam. The position has the rank and status of an ambassador extraordinary and plenipotentiary and is based at the embassy located in Hanoi, with a consulate located in Ho Chi Minh City.

== List of representatives ==
Head of mission	Tenure	Remark(s)
Juan B. Cruz Jr.	1978–1985	
Cipriano Leron	1986–1990	
Mariano L. Baccay Jr.	1990–1992	
Francisco F. Santos	1993–1995	
Rosalinda V. Tirona	1995–1998	
Jorge V. Arrizabal	1998–2001	
Guillermo G. Wong	2002–2003	
Victoriano M. Lecaros	2003–2005	
Estrella Berenguel	2005–2007	
Laura Q. Del Rosario	2007–2009	
Jerril G. Santos	2009–2016	
Noel M. Servigon	2016–2019	Appointment was confirmed by the Commission on Appointments on 16 December 2015. Credentials were presented on 26 March 2016.
Meynardo L.B. Montealegre	2020–2026	Credentials were presented on 22 January 2021.
Francisco Noel R. Fernandez III	2026–present	Credentials were presented on 6 February 2026.
Source: Embassy of the Republic of the Philippines, Hanoi
