= Jaroslav Olša Jr. =

Czech diplomat

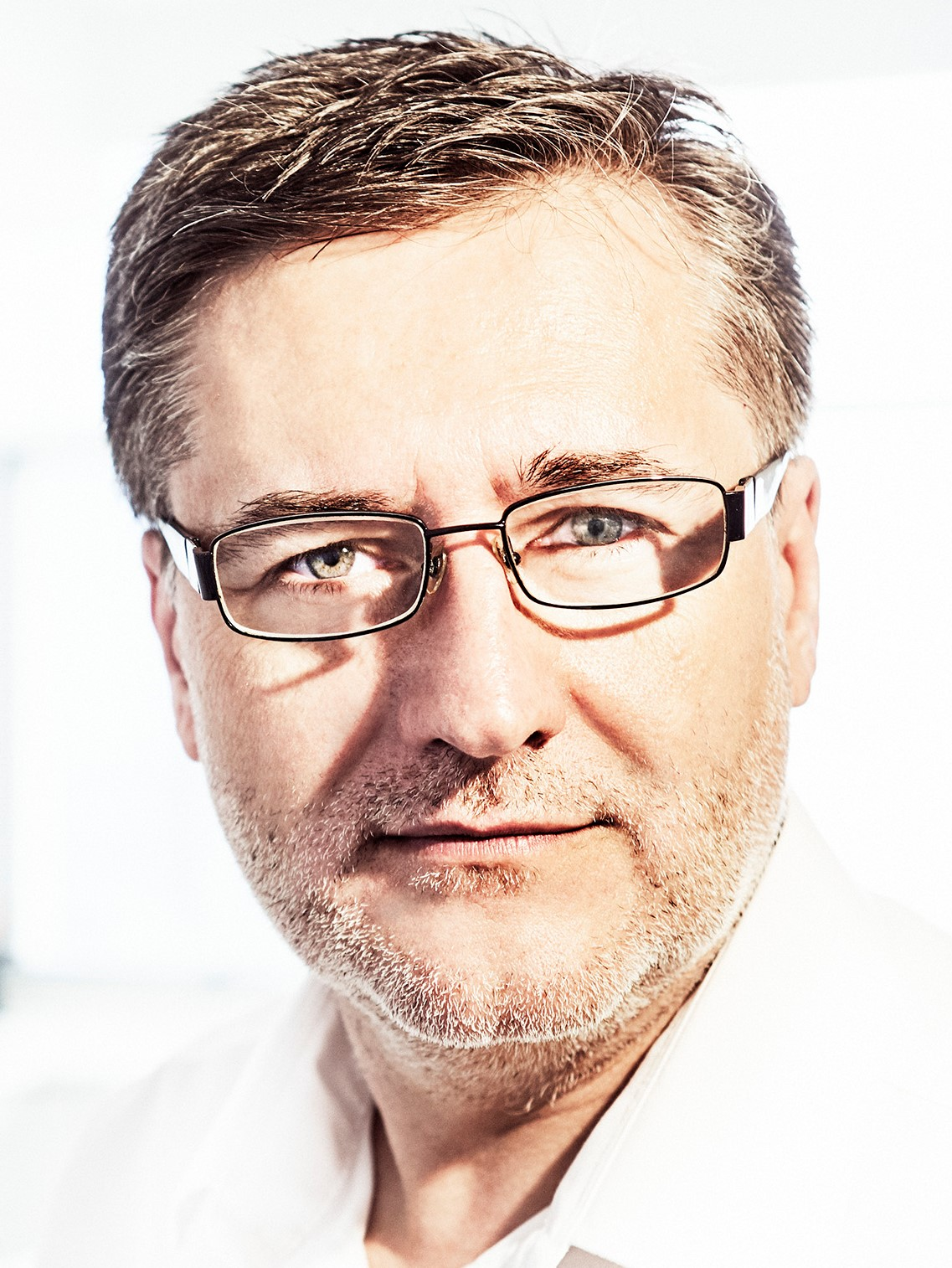
- portrait of Jaroslav Olša Jr.

Consul General of the Czech Republic in Los Angeles
- In office December 2020 – August 2025
- Preceded by: Pavol Šepeľák
- Succeeded by: Arnošt Kareš

Ambassador of the Czech Republic to the Republic of the Philippines
- In office July 2014 – December 2018
- Preceded by: Josef Rychtar
- Succeeded by: Jana Šedivá

Ambassador of the Czech Republic to the Republic of Korea
- In office August 2008 – July 2014
- Preceded by: Tomáš Smetánka
- Succeeded by: Tomáš Husák

Ambassador of the Czech Republic to the Republic of Zimbabwe
- In office May 2000 – September 2006
- Preceded by: Jaroslav Siro
- Succeeded by: Václav Jílek

Personal details
- Born: 4 August 1964 (age 62) Prague, Czechoslovakia
- Spouse: Michaela Vovková
- Children: Sebastián Olša
- Parent(s): Jaroslav Olša, Vlasta Horáková
- Education: Charles University, Prague
- Profession: Diplomat and writer

Jaroslav Olša Jr. (born 4 August 1964) is a Czech diplomat and writer. His posts include those of Ambassador to Zimbabwe (2000–2006), South Korea (2008–2014) and the Philippines (2014–2018). and Consul General in Los Angeles (2020–2025). He has written books on the history, art and literature of Asia and Africa.

He is a science fiction editor, translator and bibliographer. He is also the author of books and articles on history, culture and literature of Asia and Africa and historical relations of the non-European countries with the Czech Lands. He has published articles about science fiction and edited over a dozen anthologies of Czech and international science fiction. He has written for a wide-range of publications such as the Czech edition of National Geographic, Nový Orient (New Orient), Světová literatura (World Literature), Mezinárodní politika (Foreign Policy), Mezinárodní vztahy (International Relations). He has contributed to various other Czech and foreign-language encyclopedias. He was also a curator of art exhibitions, member of the jury of 2011 Bucheon International Fantastic Film Festival, and initiated numerous cultural exchanges and activities.

== Science fiction ==
In 1986 he established the Czechoslovak samizdat fanzine Ikarie, named after the Czech science fiction film Ikarie XB-1. Its issues were titled Ikarie XB-1, Ikarie XB-2, and so on. In 1990, the magazine became a professional monthly under the title Ikarie, with Olša as deputy editor for the first year. It later changed its title to XB-1, and closed down in 2024. Together with Alexandre Hlinka, Olša established a science fiction publishing house, AFSF, which published over 70 titles until the late 1990s.

Olša was co-editor, with Ondřej Neff, of the Czech-language Encyclopedia of Science Fiction Literature (1995; Czech: Encyklopedie literatury science fiction)

== Literary works ==
=== Non-fiction ===
- Francis (František) Korbel: The First Czech-American Millionaire of the 19th Century. Prague: Nová vlna 2026. 66 pp. ISBN 978-80-53048-31-6
- Dreaming of Autonomous Vehicles: Miles (Miloslav) J. Breuer: Czech-American Writer and the Birth of Science Fiction. Joshua Tree: Space Cowboy Books - Prague: Nová vlna 2025. 175 pp. ISBN 979-8-9896308-6-8 ISBN 978-80-53048-08-8
- V odlesku Hollywoodu. Čeští a českoslovenští konzulové v Los Angeles. (In the Limelight of Hollywood: Czech and Czechoslovak Consuls in Los Angeles). Praha: Nová vlna 2024. 176 pp. ISBN 978-80-88343-84-4 ISBN 978-1-7361199-6-9
- Czech Painters of California. Los Angeles: Společnost pro vědy a umění Los Angeles 2023. 71 pp. ISBN 978-80-88343-68-4 ISBN 978-1-7361199-5-2
- Konzulární úřady České republiky v zahraničí (1993-2021) (Consular Offices of the Czech Republic Abroad (1993-2021). Praha: Ministerstvo zahraničních věcí 2022. 105 pp. - with Ivana Hlavsová. ISBN 978-80-7441-081-9
- Miloslav (Miles) J. Breuer. Česko-americký spisovatel u zrodu moderní science fiction (Miloslav /Miles/ J. Breuer: Czech-American Writer at the Birth of Modern Science Fiction. Praha: Nová vlna 2023. 135 pp. - ISBN 978-80-88343-56-1
- Czechs and Alaska. From the Heart of Europe to the Northern Edge of America. Praha: Nová vlna - Los Angeles: Consulate General of the Czech Republic in Los Angeles 2021. 55 pp. ISBN 978-80-7441-069-7 (MZV ČR), ISBN 978-80-88343-18-9 (Nová vlna), ISBN 978-1-7361199-2-1 (Consulate General of the Czech Republic in Los Angeles). - with Zdeněk Lyčka.
- The Amazing Breuer. Early Czech-American Science Fiction Author Miloslav (Miles) J. Breuer (1889–1945). Praha: Nová vlna – Los Angeles: Consulate General of the Czech Republic in Los Angeles 2020. 28 pp. ISBN 978-80-7441-059-8 (MZV ČR), ISBN 978-80-88343-16-5 (Nová vlna), ISBN 978-1-7361199-0-7 (Consulate General of the Czech Republic in Los Angeles). – chapbook available online
- To the Upper Zambezi. Some 19th Century Notes of Czech Traveller Emil Holub. Praha: Nová vlna 2020. - co-editor Rob S. Burrett. ISBN 978-80-7441-068-0 (MZV ČR) ISBN 978-80-88343-17-2
- 150 Years of Hidden Ties Between Koreans and Czechs – 체코와의 숨겨진 오랜 인연, 150년의 교류사. Praha: Nová vlna 2020. 160 pp. – hardbound coffee table book produced on the occasion of the 30th anniversary of the Czech-Korean diplomatic relations. ISBN 978-80-88343-14-1
- Han Hŭng-su – otec československé koreanistiky. Korejský historik ve střední Evropě třicátých a čtyřicátých let 20. století (Han Heung-su: Father of Czechoslovak Korean Studies. Korean Historian in the 1930s and 1940s Central Europe). Praha: Nová vlna 2013. 446 pp. ISBN 978-80-85845-36-5 – co-editor Miriam Löwensteinová.
- The Korean Peninsula after the Armistice as Seen by Czechoslovak Delegates to the Neutral Nations Supervisory Commission 1953–1956. – 정전 후 남과 북. 체코슬로바키아 중립국감독위원단이 본. Seoul: Seoul Museum of History 2013. 291 pp. ISBN 978-89-915536-6-8 – co-editors Jongmin Sa and Seongju Hong. (Introduction available online)
- Czech-Korean Film Encounters. History of interaction between the two cinematographies from the 1930s to today. – 양국간의 영화 상호작용 역사 1930년대부터 현재까지 (Jangkukkanŭi jŏnghwa sanghočakjong jŏksa 1930 njŏntäputchŏ hjŏnčäkkači). Seoul: Korean Film Archive 2013. 47 pp. no ISBN
- 1901 photographs of Seoul by Enrique Stanko Vráz and other early Czech travellers' views of Korea – 1901년 체코인 브라즈의 서울 방문. 체코 여행기들의 서울 이야기. Seoul: Seoul Museum of History 2011. 237 pp. ISBN 978-89-91553-25-5 (SHM) 978-80-7441-001-7 (MZV) – co-editor Kang Hong-bin. (Introduction available online)
- Modern Art of Zimbabwe. – 짐바브웨 현대미술전. Seoul: Korea Foundation Cultural Center 2010. 104 pp. ISBN 978-89-86090-35-2
- Dějiny Zimbabwe, Zambie a Malawi (History of Zimbabwe, Zambia and Malawi). Praha: Nakladatelství Lidové noviny 2008. 656 pp, ISBN 978-80-7106-952-2. – co-author Otakar Hulec.
- Čtyři generace zimbabwských sochařů (Four Generations of Zimbabwean Sculptors). Praha: Botanická zahrada hl. m. Prahy 2007. 81 pp. ISBN 978-80-903697-5-7.
- Afrika očima českých fotografů (Africa as Seen by Czech Photographers). Praha: České centrum Praha – Ministerstvo zahraničních věcí ČR 2007. 23 pp. No ISBN. – exhibition catalogue (Czech/English/French)
- Stephen Kappata – Zambia – Africa. Jablonec nad Nisou: Karel Pupík 2006. 24 pp. No ISBN. – exhibition catalogue (Czech/English)
- Moderní zimbabwské sochařství (Modern Zimbabwean Sculpture). Praha: Orientální ústav Akademie věd České republiky 2003. 86 pp. ISBN 80-85425-45-9 – co-editors Otakar Hulec and Celia Winter-Irving.
- Encyklopedie literatury science fiction (Encyclopedia of Science Fiction Literature). Praha – Jinočany: AFSF – H&H 1995. 555 pp. ISBN 80-85390-33-7 (AFSF) ISBN 80-85787-90-3 (H&H) – co-editor Ondřej Neff.
- Bibliografie českých a slovenských fanzinů za rok 1988 (Bibliography of Czech and Slovak Fanzines for 1988). Praha: Ústřední kulturní dům železničářů – SFK R. U. R. 1990. 61 pp. – mimeographed, no ISBN
- Bibliografie českých a slovenských fanzinů do roku 1987 (Bibliography of Czech and Slovak Fanzines till 1989) (2 vol.). Praha: Ústřední kulturní dům železničářů – SFK R. U. R. 1988. 56+73 leaves – mimeographed, no ISBN

=== Anthologies ===
- Antologie moderní české prózy: Kompendium textů pro zájemce i výuku (Anthology of Modern Czech Fiction). Prague: Nová vlna 2026. 204 pp. ISBN 978-80-53048-43-9- co-editor Ivana Bozděchová.
- Miloslav J. Breuer: Osudný paprsek a další povídky raného česko-amerického spisovatele (The Fatal Ray, and Other Stories of Early Czech-American Writer). Prague: Nová vlna 2025. - co-editors František Hlous, Zdeněk Rampas, and Michaela Rampasová.
- チェコSF短編小説集2. カレル・チャペック賞の作家たち (Cheko esuefu tanpen shosetsushu 2. Karel Čapek syo no sakka tachi) (Selection of Czech Science Fiction 2 Stories from Karel Čapek Award). Tokyo: Heibonsha 2023. 505 pp. ISBN 978-4-582-76939-5 - co-editor Zdeněk Rampas, second anthology of Czech science fiction in Japanese
- ROBOT100. Povídky (ROBOT100. Stories). Praha: Argo 2020. 395 pp. ISBN 978-80-257-3341-7 – co-editor Richard Klíčník. – anthology of original short stories celebrating centenary of "R. U. R." by Karel Čapek, creator of the world "robot"
- Kuřata v hadí kleci. Moderní filipínské povídky (Chicks in a Snake's Cage. Modern Philippine Short Stories). Praha: Argo 2020. 376 pp. ISBN 978-80-257-3143-7 – co-editor Silvie Mitlenerová. – selection of the best contemporary short stories by Philippine writers
- Somtow Sucharitkul: Den v Mallworldu (A Day in Mallworld). Praha: Nová vlna 2019. 114 pp. ISBN 978-80-88343-02-8 – co-editor Zdeněk Rampas. – selection of short stories by Thai-American writer
- Haká. European Speculative Fiction in Filipino. Mandaluyong: Anvil Publishing 2019. 321 pp. ISBN 978-971-27-3489-2 – co-editor Julie Nováková. – anthology of European science fiction in Filipino
- Patid. Mga Kontemporaneong Kuwento ng mga Czech at Slovak na Manunulat. Naga City: Ateneo de Naga University Press 2018. 116 pp. ISBN 978-971-9913-86-3 – co-editors Edgar de Bruin, Julia Sherwood and Kristian Sendon Cordero. – anthology of contemporary Czech and Slovak short stories in Filipino
- Malikmata. Mga Kuwentong Kababalaghang mula Czech Republic. Naga City: Ateneo de Naga University Press 2018. 114 pp. ISBN 978-971-9913-84-9 – co-editor Kristian Sendon Cordero. – anthology of Czech fantastic short stories, legends and fairy tales in Filipino
- チェコSF短編小説集 (Cheko esuefu tanpen shosetsushu)(Selection of Czech Science Fiction). Tokyo: Heibonsha 2018. 402 pp. ISBN 978-4-582-76872-5 – co-editor Kiyomi Hirano. – first anthology of Czech science fiction in Japanese
- Pagtuod. Mga Sigulanong Europeo sa Minasbate kag Tigaonon. Naga City: Ateneo de Naga University Press 2018. 142 pp. ISBN 978-971-9913-79-5 – co-editors Enrique S. Villasis and Clinton D. Abilong. – anthology of European classics from eleven countries in Minasbate and Ticaonon
- Pagkamuot. Mga Binirikol na Usipon Gikan sa Europa. Naga City: Ateneo de Naga University Press 2018. 97 pp. ISBN 978-971-9913-78-8 – co-editors Kristian Sendon Cordero and Jusán Villaflor Misolás. – anthology of European classics from thirteen countries in Bikol
- Paglaum. Mga Susumaton nga Europeo ha Waray. Naga City: Ateneo de Naga University Press 2018. 150 pp. ISBN 978-971-9913-77-1 – co-editors Jerry B. Grácio and Michael Carlo Villas. – anthology of European classics from twelve countries in Waray
- Agos: Modern European Writers in Filipino. Mandaluyong: Anvil Publishing 2018. 231 pp. ISBN 978-971-27-3409-0 – anthology of modern European writers from twelve countries in Filipino
- Ang Laláking Nakalilipad at Ibá pang mga Kuwentong Czech. Manila: Komisyon sa Wikang Filipino – Pambansang Komisyon para sa Kultura at mga Sining 2017. 252 pp. ISBN 978-621-8064-34-8 – co-editor Ivana Bozděchová, Filipino editors Roberto T. Añonuevo and Roland T. Glory. – anthology of Czech literature from the late 19th until the early 21st centuries in Filipino
- Ang Manggagaway. At iba pang kathang-agham at pantasya mula sa gitnang Europa at Pilipinas. Mandaluyong: Visprint 2017. 320 pp. ISBN 971-0545-80-9 – co-editors Dean Francis Alfar and József Bencze. – anthology of science fiction and fantasy short stories from Visegrad 4 countries (Czech Republic, Hungary, Poland, Slovakia) in Filipino
- Karel Čapek: Lambang ika, kita gabos. Naga City: Ateneo de Naga University Press 2017. 206 pp. ISBN 978-971-9913-59-7 – co-editors Kristian Sendon Cordero and Paz Verdades M. Santos – selection of short stories by Karel Čapek in Bikol
- Layag: European Classics in Filipino. Mandaluyong: Anvil Publishing 2017. – anthology of European classics from eleven countries in Filipino
- 트로야의 빌라 (Trojaui villa) (Villa in Trója). Seoul: Happy Reading Books 2012. 240 pp. ISBN 978-89-89571-80-3 – anthology of Czech classics in Korean
- Pramlok: Cena Karla Čapka za rok 1983. Praha: Netopejr 2012. ISBN 978-80-87044-46-9 – co-editors Přemysl Houžvička and Zdeněk Rampas – anthology of Czech science fiction
- 체코 단편소설 걸작선 (Čchekcho tanpjonsusor korčakson). Seoul: Happy Reading Books 2011. – co-editor Ivana Bozděchová – anthology of Czech classics in Korean
- 제대로된 시체답게 행동해 (Četelo tön sičchetapke hängtonghä! / Jaedero dueon sichaedabgae hengdonghe). Seoul: Happy Reading Books 2011. 519 pp. ISBN 978-89-89571-74-2 – co-editor Park Sang-joon – first anthology of Czech science fiction in Korean
- Pramlok: Cena Karla Čapka za rok 1982. Praha: Netopejr 2011. 239 pp. ISBN 978-80-87044-45-2. – co-editors Přemysl Houžvička and Zdeněk Rampas.- anthology of Czech science fiction
- Nevanji Bayaya nedzimwe nyaya. Nganonyorwa kubva kuCzech. Harare: Zimbabwe Publishing House 2004. 56 pp. ISBN 1-77901-203-9. – selection of Czech fairy-tales in Shona
- Přivolávač deště. Moderní zimbabwské povídky (The Rainmaker. Modern Zimbabwean Short Stories). Praha: DharmaGaia 2003. 127 pp. ISBN 80-86685-08-X. – co-editor Mbongeni Malaba – first anthology of Zimbabwean short stories in Czech
- Ziyajuluka. Indatshana zabasakhulayo eziphuma kwele Tsheki (Czech). Harare: Zimbabwe Publishing House 2001. 66 pp. ISBN 1-77901-173-3 – anthology of Czech science fiction in Ndebele
- Experiment se sci-fi (Experiment with Sci-fi). Šumperk: SFK Makropulos 1998. 22 pp. No ISBN – anthology of Asian short-short science fiction
- Tunel pod světem. The Best of Frederik Pohl Praha: AFSF 1996. – science fiction
- Zpátky na zemi. The Best of Harry Harrison (writer). Praha: AFSF 1996. 252 pp. ISBN 80-85390-41-8 – science fiction
- Vampire and other Science Stories from Czech Lands. New Delhi: Star Publication 1994. 160 pp. No ISBN – anthology of Czech science fiction in English
- Hvězdy jako bozi (Stars Like Gods). Praha: AFSF 1993. 296 pp. ISBN 80-85390-19-1 – anthology of Anglo-American science fiction
- Přestřelka na úsvitě. Praha: AFSF 1993. 74 pp. ISBN 80-85390-11-6 – science fiction anthology
- Světy science fiction (Worlds of Science Fiction). Praha: AFSF 1993. 290 pp. ISBN 80-85390-13-2 – anthology of science fiction from all over the world
- Stanley G. Weinbaum: Odyssea na Marsu (A Martian Odyssey). Praha: AFSF 1992. 227 pp. ISBN 80-85390-05-1 – selection of science fiction short stories
- Srdce technopopu (The Heart of Technopop). Praha: AFSF 1992. 121 pp. ISBN 80-85390-01-9 – anthology of science fiction

== Awards and decorations ==
- 2011 United States: The Mark Palmer Prize for Diplomats – received from Hon. Audronius Ažubalis, Minister of Foreign Affairs of the Republic of Lithunania on the 6th Ministerial of the Community of Democracies in Vilnius on 1 July 2011
- 2012 South Korea: Honorary Citizenship of Seoul – awarded by Hon. Mr. Park Won-soon, Seoul City Mayor on 29 October 2012
- 2018 Philippines: Order of Sikatuna, rank Datu, gold distinction – highest Philippine order, bestowed by H.E. Mr. Rodrigo Duterte, President of the Republic of the Philippines on 23 November 2018
