= Jerril Santos =

Jerril G. Santos

Ambassador of the Philippines to Vietnam
- In office November 2009 – January 2016
- President: Gloria Macapagal Arroyo; Benigno Aquino III
- Preceded by: Laura Q. Del Rosario
- Succeeded by: Noel M. Servigon

Jerril Galban Santos is the current Consul general at the Philippine Consulate General, Houston. Previously, he was the Chief of Mission of the Philippine Embassy in Vietnam from 2009 to 2016. He has been with the Department of Foreign Affairs since the 1980s and is a recipient of the Gawad Mabini, with a rank of Dakilang Kasugo (2007) and the Order of Sikatuna, with a rank of Datu (2009). He was among the Outstanding Fernandino Award honorees in 2012.
