= List of ambassadors of the Philippines to Timor-Leste =

Ambassador of the Republic of the Philippines to the Democratic Republic of Timor-Leste
- Sugo ng Republika ng Pilipinas sa Demokratikong Republika ng Timor-Leste; Embaixador da República das Filipinas em República Democrática de Timor-Leste; Embaixador Republika Filipina ba Repúblika Demokrátika Timór Lorosa'e
- Seal of the Department of Foreign Affairs of the Philippines
- Incumbent; Mary Ann A. Padua since January 30, 2025
- Department of Foreign Affairs; Embassy of the Philippines, Dili
- Style: Her Excellency
- Reports to: Department of Foreign Affairs
- Seat: Dili, Timor-Leste
- Nominator: Secretary of Foreign Affairs
- Appointer: President of the Philippines; with the advice and consent of the Commission on Appointments
- Term length: No fixed term
- Inaugural holder: Rafael E. Seguis (non-resident); Farita Aguilucho-Ong
- Formation: August 4, 2003
- Website: Philippine Embassy, Dili

The ambassador of the Republic of the Philippines to the Democratic Republic of Timor-Leste (Filipino: Sugo ng Republika ng Pilipinas sa Demokratikong Republika ng Timor-Leste; Portuguese: Embaixador da República das Filipinas em República Democrática de Timor-Leste; Tetum: Embaixador Republika Filipina ba Repúblika Demokrátika Timór Lorosa'e) is the Republic of the Philippines' foremost diplomatic representative in Timor-Leste. As head of the Philippines' diplomatic mission there, the ambassador is the official representative of the president and the government of the Philippines to the president and government of Timor-Leste. The position has the rank and status of an ambassador extraordinary and plenipotentiary and is based at the embassy located in Dili, the capital of the country.

== Heads of mission ==
Head of mission	Tenure	Note(s)
Rafael E. Seguis	August 4, 2003 – 2004	First and only non-resident Philippine ambassador to Timor-Leste; the residence is in Jakarta, Indonesia.
Farita Aguilucho-Ong	May 17, 2004 – 2008	
Leoncio R. Cardenas	February 2008 – June 2009	
Maria Aileen H. Bugarin	July 2009 – July 2015	
Evelyn D. Austria-Garcia	September 2015 – March 2017	
Abdulmaid K. Muin	September 16, 2017 – June 22, 2022	Credentials were presented to President Francisco Guterres on October 10, 2017.
Dean Jason N. Arriola	June 23, 2022 – April 15, 2023	Chargé d'Affaires
Belinda M. Ante	April 16, 2023 – November 2024	
Mary Ann A. Padua	January 30, 2025 – present	
Source: Embassy of the Republic of the Philippines, Dili

== See also ==
- Philippines–Timor-Leste relations
