= List of ambassadors of the Philippines to Norway =

List of ambassadors of the Philippines

Ambassador of the Republic of the Philippines to the Kingdom of Norway
- Sugo ng Republika ng Pilipinas sa Kaharian ng Noruwega; Utsending av Republikken Filippinene til kongeriket Norge
- Seal of the Department of Foreign Affairs of the Philippines
- Incumbent; Enrico T. Fos since December 2, 2021
- Department of Foreign Affairs; Embassy of the Philippines, Oslo
- Style: His Excellency
- Reports to: Department of Foreign Affairs
- Seat: Oslo, Norway
- Nominator: Secretary of Foreign Affairs
- Appointer: President of the Philippines; with the advice and consent of the Commission on Appointments
- Term length: No fixed term
- Inaugural holder: Victoria S. Bataclan
- Formation: April 30, 2007
- Website: Philippine Embassy, Oslo

The ambassador of the Republic of the Philippines to the Kingdom of Norway (Filipino: Sugo ng Republika ng Pilipinas sa Kaharian ng Noruwega; Norwegian: Utsending av Republikken Filippinene til kongeriket Norge) is the Republic of the Philippines' foremost diplomatic representative in Norway. As head of the Philippines' diplomatic mission there, the ambassador is the official representative of the president and the government of the Philippines to the king and government of the Kingdom of Norway. The position has the rank and status of an ambassador extraordinary and plenipotentiary and is based at the embassy at Nedre Vollgate 8, Oslo, Norway. This diplomatic post is also accredited as a non-resident ambassador to the country of Iceland.

Although the diplomatic relations between the two countries were established on March 2, 1948, this diplomatic post and the resident embassy were established on April 30, 2007, almost 60 years as a non-resident accreditation from the embassies in London and Stockholm.

== List of heads of mission ==
Head of mission	Tenure	Note(s)
Victoria S. Bataclan	May 2007 – January 2009	
Elizabeth P. Buensuceso	January 2009 – September 2011	
Bayani S. Mercado	September 2011 – 2017	
Jocelyn Batoon-Garcia	2017 – January 2021	
Enrico T. Fos	December 2, 2021 – present	Appointment confirmed by the Commission of Appointments on September 1, 2021. Credentials were presented on December 2, 2021.
Source: Embassy of the Republic of the Philippines, Oslo

== See also ==
- Foreign relations of Norway
- Foreign relations of the Philippines
