= List of ambassadors of the Philippines to Bahrain =

Ambassador of the Republic of the Philippines to the Kingdom of Bahrain
- Sugo ng Republika ng Pilipinas sa Kaharian ng Bahrain سفير جمهورية الفلبين لدى المملكة العربية السعودية
- Coat of arms of the Republic of the Philippines
- Incumbent; Gines Jaime Ricardo D. Gallaga since 20 January 2026
- Department of Foreign Affairs; Embassy of the Philippines, Manama
- Style: His Excellency
- Reports to: Department of Foreign Affairs
- Seat: Manama, Bahrain
- Nominator: Secretary for Foreign Affairs
- Appointer: President of the Philippines; with the advice and consent of the Commission on Appointments
- Term length: No fixed term
- Inaugural holder: Leonides T. Caday
- Formation: 14 April 1992
- Website: Philippine Embassy, Manama

The ambassador of the Republic of the Philippines to the Kingdom of Bahrain (Filipino: Sugo ng Republika ng Pilipinas sa Kaharian ng Bahrain; Arabic: سفيسفير جمهورية الفلبين لدى مملكة البحرين : safir jumhuriat alfilibiyn ladaa mamlakat albahrayn) is the Philippines' foremost diplomatic representative to the Kingdom of Bahrain. As head of mission, the Philippine ambassador is the official representative of the president and the government of the Philippines to the king and the government of Bahrain.

== List of heads of mission ==
Head of mission	Tenure	Note(s)
Leonides T. Caday	14 April 1992 – 3 June 1994	
Akmad A. Sakkam	13 July 1994 – 16 March 1999	
Rodolfo I. Dumapias	16 June 1999 – 19 June 2002	
Maria Leticia C. Ramos	19 June 2002 – 31 March 2003	Charge d’ Affaires, a.i.
Eduardo Pablo M. Maglaya	31 March 2003 – 27 July 2009	
Ma. Corazon Yap-Bahjin	27 July 2009 – 7 May 2013	
Sahid S. Glang	7 May 2013 – 24 May 2015	
Alfonso Ferdinand A. Ver	24 May 2015 – March 2017	
Anne Jalando-on Louis	19 April 2022 – 27 July 2025	Chargée d'affaires from 2022 to 2023. Appointment as ambassador was confirmed by the Commission on Appointments on 7 December 2022. Credentials were presented on 2 May 2023.
Gines Jaime Ricardo D. Gallaga	20 January 2026 – present	Appointed to the position by President Bongbong Marcos on 2 June 2025. Confirmed by the Commission on Appointments on 3 September. Credentials were presented on 20 January 2026.
Source: Embassy of the Philippines, Manama
