= List of ambassadors of the Czech Republic to the Philippines =

List of ambassadors

Ambassador of the Czech Republic to the Republic of the Philippines
- Sugo ng Republikang Tseko sa Republika ng Pilipinas; Vyslanci České republice v Filipínské republiky
- Coat of arms of the Czech Republic
- Incumbent; Karel Hejč since 24 October 2023
- Ministry of Foreign Affairs; Embassy of the Czech Republic, Manila
- Style: His Excellency
- Seat: Manila, Philippines
- Nominator: Government of the Czech Republic; through the cabinet and the Minister of Foreign Affairs
- Appointer: President of the Czech Republic
- Inaugural holder: Miloš Křivda
- Formation: 8 May 1980 (Note: Earliest official date of the first government-appointed resident Czech representative in the Philippines. Attributed to this reference:)
- Website: Czech Embassy, Manila

The ambassador of the Czech Republic to the Republic of the Philippines (Filipino: Sugo ng Republikang Tseko sa Republika ng Pilipinas; Czech: Vyslanci České republice v Filipínské republiky) is the Czech Republic's foremost diplomatic representative in the Philippines. As head of the Czech Republic's diplomatic mission there, the ambassador is the official representative of the president and the government of the Czech Republic to the president and government of the Philippines. The position has the rank and status of an ambassador extraordinary and plenipotentiary and is based at the embassy on the 30th floor of the Rufino Pacific Star Building in Makati.

Although the two nations' current diplomatic ties were established on 5 October 1973, the Czechoslovak ambassador to Japan at the time held the position of non-resident ambassador from 1974 until 1994, when the resident chargé d'affaires (which was in effect from 1980 until 1999) assumed responsibility. Since 6 September 1999, the position has served as the resident representative to the Philippines, as well as the non-resident representative to the countries of the Marshall Islands, Micronesia, Nauru, and Palau.

== Representatives ==
Name	Tenure	Notes
1974–1994: Non-resident Ambassadors (based in Tokyo)
Rudolf Kožušník	29 April 1974 – 1977	
Karel Houška	28 June 1977 – 1983	
Gustav Šmíd	31 May 1983 – 1988	
Rudolf Jakubík	17 March 1988 – 1990	
Jan Winkelhöfer	29 October 1990 – 1994	Retained by the Czech government after the dissolution of Czechoslovakia.
1980–1999: Resident Chargé d'Affaires (based in Manila)
Miloš Křivda	5 May 1980 – 1986	
František Matějka	August 1986 – 1989	
Milan Ducháček	28 August 1989 – 1994	Retained by the Czech government after the dissolution of Czechoslovakia.
Jiří Soukup	1994 – 1999	
1999–present: Resident Ambassadors
Stanislav Slavický	6 September 1999 – 2005	
Jaroslav Ludva	27 October 2005 – 2009	
Josef Rychtar	13 November 2009 – 2014	
Jaroslav Olša Jr.	10 September 2014 – December 2018	
Jana Šedivá	15 January 2019 – 2023	Credentials were presented on 15 January 2019.
Karel Hejč	24 October 2023 – present	Credentials were presented on 24 October 2023.
Source: Embassy of the Czech Republic, Manila

== See also ==
- List of ambassadors of the Philippines to the Czech Republic
