= Filipinos in Egypt =

- (Philippines) (Egypt)
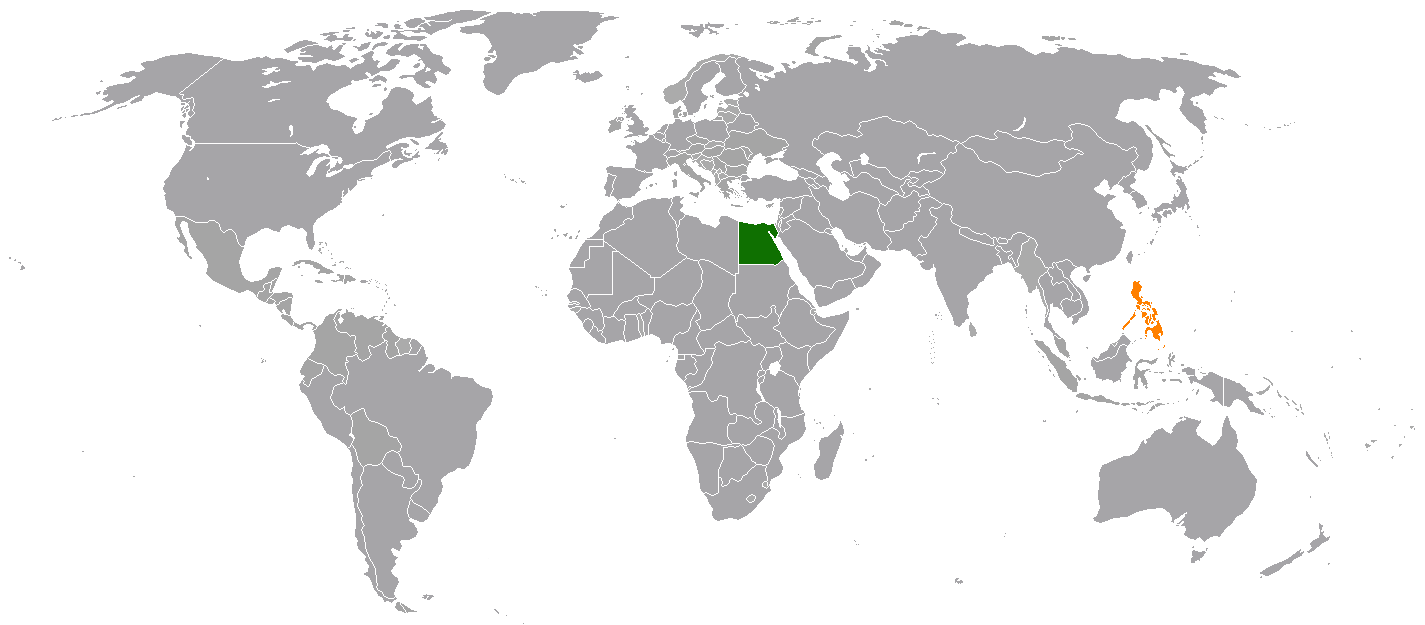

Total population
- 4,178 (2006)

Regions with significant populations
- Cairo and Alexandria.

Languages
- Tagalog · English · Other languages of the Philippines · Egyptian Arabic

Religion
- Christianity mainly Roman Catholicism.

Related ethnic groups
- Overseas Filipino

Filipinos in Egypt consist of migrant workers in a variety of sectors, as well as a smaller number of international students. An estimated 2,300 reside in Egypt legally, while another 1,878 live there illegally.

== Employment ==
A large number of Filipinos in Egypt are employed as domestic workers, though employing foreigners in such positions is illegal under Egyptian law. Such workers typically gain entrance to Egypt either by entering alone on a tourist visa and overstaying, by applying an Egyptian visa intended for skilled workers and falsifying their intended employment, or by obtaining a visa for domestic work in a nearby country such as Jordan, Kuwait, or the United Arab Emirates and then having their sponsor there bring them to Egypt and leave them (as Egypt permits foreign tourists to bring their domestic helpers with them when they enter the country on holiday). Filipinos sometimes come to Egypt knowing that they will be employed as domestic workers, but often they are tricked by recruiters as to the nature of their employment; the Philippine Department of Foreign Affairs has had to issue public warnings that Egypt does not permit foreigners to work as domestic helpers, and in one case had to ban an employment agency from recruiting in the country and declaring its owner (an Egyptian whose son-in-law was alleged to be a powerful government official) an undesirable alien.

Filipino domestic workers in Egypt typically manage to remit between US$400 and $600 per month to their families back in the Philippines. However, they often face abuse from their employers; sometimes their employers even accuse them of theft and deport them without paying their wages.

== Education ==
Egypt is an important destination for Muslim Filipino religious students, as it is home to the prestigious Al-Azhar University. At the end of 2005, roughly 400 Filipino students studies.

== See also ==
- Egypt–Philippines relations
- Filipino diaspora
- Ethnic groups in Egypt
