= Embassy of Palestine, Damascus =

Embassy of the State of Palestine in Syria سفارة دولة فلسطين لدى سوريا
- Location: Damascus
- Address: Murshid Khater Street
- Ambassador: Samir al-Rifai

The Embassy of the State of Palestine in Syria (Arabic: سفارة دولة فلسطين لدى سوريا) is the diplomatic mission of Palestine in Syria. It is located in Murshid Khater St. in Damascus.

This mission was originally an office of the Palestine Liberation Organization. In July 2011, Syria officially announced to recognize establishment of the State of Palestine with 1967 borders and with East Jerusalem as its capital, and added the PLO office would be upgraded to the embassy of a sovereign state.

== List of ambassadors ==
No.	Name	Name in Arabic	Appointment	Dismissal	Remarks
1	Mahmoud Al-Khalidi	محمود الخالدي	1969	2021	Died in office
2	Samir al-Rifai	سمير الرفاعي	2021	incumbent	

== See also ==
- Palestine–Syria relations
- List of diplomatic missions in Syria
- List of diplomatic missions of Palestine
