= Bernardita Catalla =

Philippine ambassador

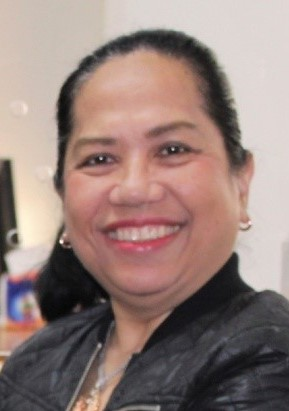
- Ambassador Catalla in February 2018
- Born: February 18, 1958; Makati, Philippines
- Died: April 2, 2020 (aged 62); Beirut, Lebanon
- Education: University of the Philippines Los Baños; University of the Philippines Diliman; International Institute of Social Studies
- Occupation: Career diplomat
- Years active: 1993–2020

Bernardita Leonido Catalla (February 18, 1958 – April 2, 2020) was a Filipina career diplomat who was last appointed the Philippine ambassador to Lebanon. Prior to her posting in Lebanon, she was also assigned to Hong Kong, Indonesia, and Malaysia.

== Early life and education ==
Catalla was born on February 18, 1958, in Makati, then a part of the Province of Rizal. She graduated in 1979 from University of the Philippines Los Baños with a Bachelor of Arts degree in communication arts. From 1987 to 1993, she studied at the University of the Philippines Diliman for her master's degree in communication research and in 1991, she graduated with a Master of Arts degree in development studies from the International Institute of Social Studies at Erasmus University Rotterdam.

== Career ==
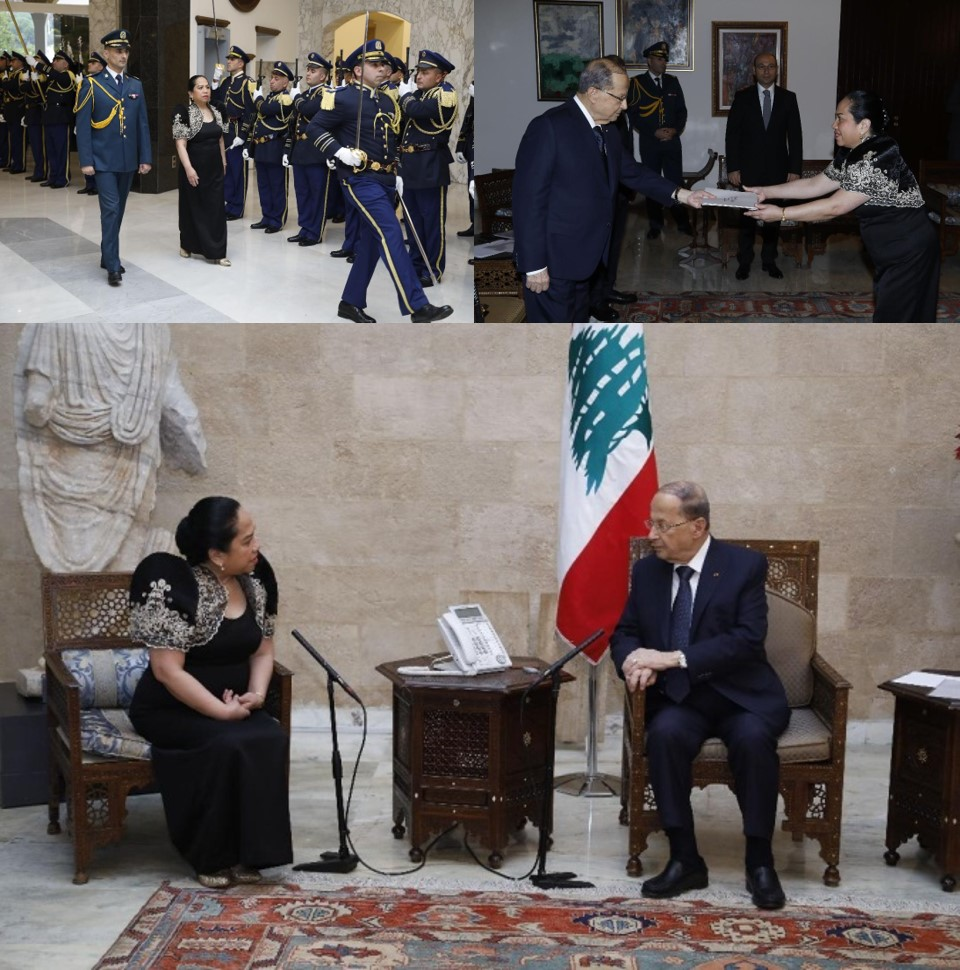
Ambassador Catalla presenting her credentials to President Michel Aoun of Lebanon on January 10, 2018

Catalla first entered the Philippine Foreign Service in 1993. She was the principal assistant and then acting director of the ASEAN office from 1994 to 1995.

From 1996 to 2001, she was assigned at the Philippine Embassy in Kuala Lumpur as Vice Consul and then Consul.

She was called back to the Home Office to become the Director of the Office of United Nations and International Organizations from 2001 to 2002 and Passport Director from 2002 to 2005.

She was consul of the Philippine Embassy in Jakarta from 2005 to 2011 and Director of the Office of Asia & Pacific Affairs at the Home Office from 2011 to 2014.

She was posted to the Philippine Consulate in Hong Kong as Consul-General from 2014 to 2017. During her stint in Hong Kong, she spearheaded the amendment of contracts of foreign domestic helpers to include a ban on dangerous window cleaning, which according to The Sun Hong Kong, was her biggest legacy to the Filipino community in the region.

After that, she was promoted to the Embassy in Beirut as Ambassador from 2017 up to her death in 2020. As Ambassador to Lebanon, she spearheaded the voluntary mass repatriation program of OFWs in the country.

== Personal life ==
In September 2015, Catalla's nephew was murdered. According to news reports, she treated him as her own son.

== Death ==
In April 2020, she died of COVID-19 in Beirut, Lebanon.

== Posthumous honors ==
- Order of Sikatuna (Rank of Datu, Gold Distinction) by Foreign Affairs Secretary Teodoro Locsin Jr. on behalf of President Rodrigo Duterte.
