= List of diplomatic missions in Syria =

Diplomatic relations between world states and Syria Syria Embassy Consulate-General

This is a list of diplomatic missions in Syria. At present, 52 nations maintain diplomatic missions to the Syria in the capital, Damascus.

== Embassies in Damascus ==
1. Algeria
2. Argentina
3. Armenia
4. Austria
5. Azerbaijan
6. Bahrain
7. Belarus
8. Brazil
9. Bulgaria
10. Chile
11. China
12. Cuba
13. Cyprus
14. Czechia
15. Denmark
16. Egypt
17. Eritrea
18. France
19. Germany
20. Greece
21. Holy See (details)
22. Hungary
23. India
24. Indonesia
25. Iraq
26. Italy
27. Jordan
28. Kuwait
29. Lebanon
30. Libya
31. Mauritania
32. Morocco
33. Nigeria
34. Oman
35. Pakistan
36. Palestine (details)
37. Philippines (details)
38. Qatar
39. Romania
40. Russia
41. Saudi Arabia
42. Serbia
43. Somalia
44. South Africa
45. Spain
46. Sudan
47. Sweden
48. Tunisia
49. Turkey
50. United Arab Emirates
51. Venezuela
52. Yemen

=== Embassies to open ===
- Kuwait
- Poland
- Ukraine
- South Korea
- United Kingdom
- United States (details)

== Other missions/delegations to Syria in Damascus ==
1. European Union (Delegation)
2. Switzerland (Swiss humanitarian aid office)

== Consular missions ==
=== Damascus ===
1. Kazakhstan (Consulate-General)

=== Aleppo ===
1. Armenia (Consulate-General)
2. Turkey (Consulate-General)

== Closed missions ==
Host city	Sending country	Mission	Year closed	Ref.
Damascus	Abkhazia	Embassy	2024	
Damascus	Australia	Embassy (Note: Under the protecting power of Romania.)	1999	
Damascus	Belgium	Embassy (Note: Resident in Beirut, Lebanon)	2012	
Damascus	Canada	Embassy (Note: Under the protecting power of Romania.)	2012	
Damascus	Finland	Embassy (Note: Resident in Beirut, Lebanon)	2013	
Damascus	Iran	Embassy (Note: To be reopened.)	2024	
Damascus	Malaysia	Embassy (Note: Resident in Beirut, Lebanon)	2012	
Damascus	Netherlands	Embassy (Note: Resident in Beirut, Lebanon)	2012	
Damascus	North Korea	Embassy	2024	
Damascus	Slovakia	Embassy (Note: Resident in Beirut, Lebanon)	2015	
Damascus	South Ossetia	Embassy	2024	
Damascus	Switzerland	Embassy	2012	
Damascus	United Kingdom	Embassy	2012	
Damascus	Vietnam	Embassy (Note: Resident in Tehran, Iran)	1990	
Aleppo	Iraq	Consulate	1975	
Aleppo	Iran	Consulate-General	2024	

== Non-resident embassies ==
=== Resident in Beirut, Lebanon ===
- Belgium
- Canada
- Colombia
- Finland
- France
- Malaysia
- Netherlands
- Norway
- Paraguay
- Poland
- Slovakia
- Sri Lanka
- Ukraine
- Uruguay

=== Resident in Cairo, Egypt ===
- Cambodia
- Cameroon
- Comoros
- Congo-Brazzaville
- Croatia
- Ecuador
- Ireland
- Mali
- Mongolia
- Myanmar
- Nepal
- Senegal
- Singapore
- Tanzania
- Uganda

=== Resident in Kuwait City ===
- Guyana
- Laos
- Uzbekistan

=== Resident in Tehran, Iran ===
- Brunei
- Ghana
- Kyrgyzstan
- Nicaragua
- Tajikistan
- Vietnam

=== Resident in other cities ===
1. Bangladesh (Amman)
2. Bosnia and Herzegovina (Amman)
3. Equatorial Guinea (Riyadh)
4. Ethiopia (Abu Dhabi)
5. Portugal (Nicosia)

== See also ==
- Foreign relations of Syria
- List of diplomatic missions of Syria
- Visa policy of Syria
