= Embassy of the Philippines, Cairo =

Diplomatic mission of the Philippines in Egypt

Embassy of the Philippines, Cairo Pasuguan ng Pilipinas sa Cairo سفارة الفلبين بالقاهرة
- Location: Cairo
- Address: 28, Street 200, Maadi, Cairo Governorate
- Coordinates: 29°57′20″N 31°16′30″E
- Ambassador: Ezzedin H. Tago
- Website: Official website

The Embassy of the Philippines in Cairo is the diplomatic mission of the Republic of the Philippines to the Arab Republic of Egypt. Opened in 1960, it is currently located in the southern Maadi district of Cairo, near the Cairo American College.

== History ==
Although relations between the Philippines and Egypt were established on March 3, 1946, four months before the country secured its independence from the United States, the Philippines did not immediately open a resident mission in Egypt. A consulate was established in Cairo during the presidency of Ramon Magsaysay in 1956, with Yusup Abubakar serving as the mission's first consul.

The following year on March 25, 1957, Magsaysay's successor, Carlos P. Garcia, nominated retired colonel Pullong Arpa of Sulu to serve as minister to Egypt, elevating the consulate to a legation. After his appointment was confirmed by the Commission on Appointments (CA), Garcia administered the oath of office to Arpa on April 12, 1957, becoming the first Muslim Filipino to be appointed minister to a foreign country. Arpa left for Egypt shortly thereafter, with Abubakar becoming the mission's chargé d'affaires.

On February 26, 1960, Arpa was appointed by Garcia as Ambassador to the United Arab Republic, elevating the legation to an embassy. However, the exact date of when the embassy was established is unclear, with accounts from students at Al-Azhar University attesting to its existence starting in the early 1960s. Until the mid-1970s, it was also the only Philippine diplomatic mission in both Africa and the Middle East.

== Staff and activities ==
The Philippine Embassy in Cairo is currently headed by Ambassador Ezzedin H. Tago, who was appointed to the position by President Rodrigo Duterte on March 30, 2021. Prior to becoming Ambassador, Tago, a career diplomat, previously served as Consul General at the Philippine Consulate General in Sydney, and prior to that served at the Philippine Embassy in Riyadh as Ambassador to Saudi Arabia. His appointment was confirmed by the Commission on Appointments on June 2, 2021, and Tago presented his credentials to President Abdel Fattah el-Sisi on September 15, 2021.

The embassy's activities center around providing to the welfare of the many Overseas Filipino Workers and other Filipinos in Egypt, for which it has been recognized by the Department of Foreign Affairs for its efforts in providing those services. It regularly monitors the employment situation for Filipinos in Egypt to ensure that they only enter the country legally, and actively repatriates OFWs there back to the Philippines during periods of unrest, even if the measures are opposed by the host government. The Cairo mission also actively assists Filipinos beyond Egypt in the countries within its jurisdiction, including Sudan, Ethiopia, Eritrea, and Djibouti. In addition to its consular and welfare functions, the embassy has also encouraged Egyptian businesses to invest in the Philippines, sought to build cultural ties between the two countries, and also showcased Filipino culture in Egypt.

Beyond its jurisdiction, the embassy has also been involved in assisting and repatriating Filipinos escaping war-torn countries and areas, including Libya, where it works with the Philippine Embassy in Tripoli, and the Gaza Strip, where it works with the Philippine Embassy in Tel Aviv.

During the ongoing civil war in Sudan, the embassy was instrumental in the evacuation and repatriation of Filipinos from the war-torn country. On their way to the Sudanese border from Cairo in April 2023, Ambassador Tago and Vice Consul Bojer Capati figured in a road accident where their car rolled over twice after they swerved to avoid a road marker. Both diplomats were unhurt.

== See also ==
- Egypt–Philippines relations
- List of diplomatic missions of the Philippines
- Filipinos in Egypt
