= Egypt–Philippines relations =

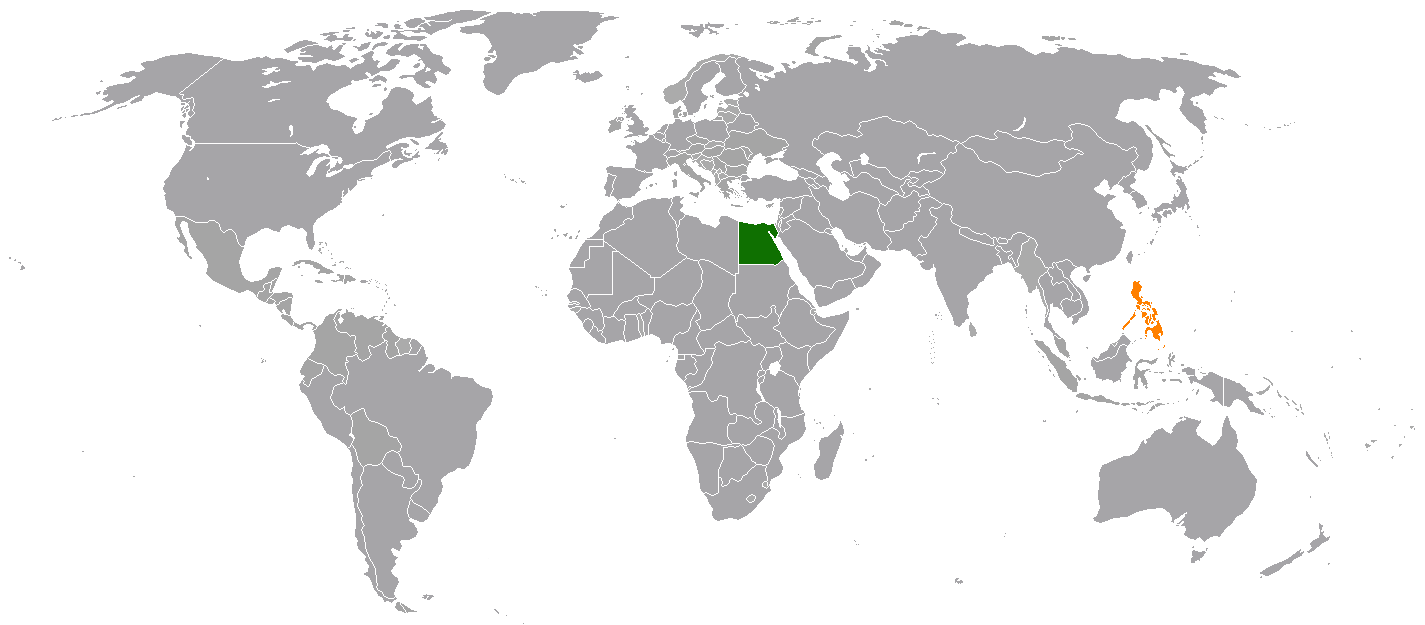

- Egypt: Philippines

Egypt–Philippines relations refers to the bilateral relations between Egypt and the Philippines. Egypt has an embassy in Manila, and the Philippines has an embassy in Cairo.

== History ==
Relations between Egyptians and Filipinos predate the modern version of these nations. During the 1500s the Ottoman Viceroy of Egypt assigned his nephew, Admiral Mafamede as officer in charge in the Sultanate of Aceh, another vassal state of the Ottoman Caliphate in Sumatra, Indonesia. The Egyptian-Ottoman Admiral, Mafamede appointed the Lucoes (Filipinos from the kingdoms of Tondo and Maynila) as warriors and promoted one named Sapetu Diraja as commander of Aru in Northeast Sumatra. The Lucoes had dual allegiance to the Ottomans and Portuguese as another Lucoes, Regimo Diraja was also a Temeggong in Portuguese Malacca. However the Lucoes eventually became adversaries against Ottoman, Egyptian and Muslim interests when the Spaniards conquered Manila and forcibly converted its once Muslim community to Christianity.

Diplomatic relations between Egypt and the Philippines was established on 3 March 1946. A Treaty of Friendship was signed between the two countries on 18 January 1955 formally establishing ties. The Philippines opened an embassy in Cairo in the 1960s which was the sole diplomatic post of the country in the African and Arab region until the mid-1970s.

The fifth round of political consultations between the Ministry of Foreign Affairs of the Arab Republic of Egypt and Department of Foreign Affairs of the Republic of the Philippines were in Cairo on July 4, 2007.

== State visit ==
Philippine President Gloria Macapagal Arroyo made a state visit to Egypt from 2–3 May 2009 where she met her counterpart, then Egyptian President Hosni Mubarak.

== See also ==
- Foreign relations of Egypt
- Foreign relations of the Philippines
- Filipinos in Egypt
