= Department of Foreign Affairs (Philippines) =

Executive department of the Philippine government

- Kagawaran ng Ugnayang Panlabas

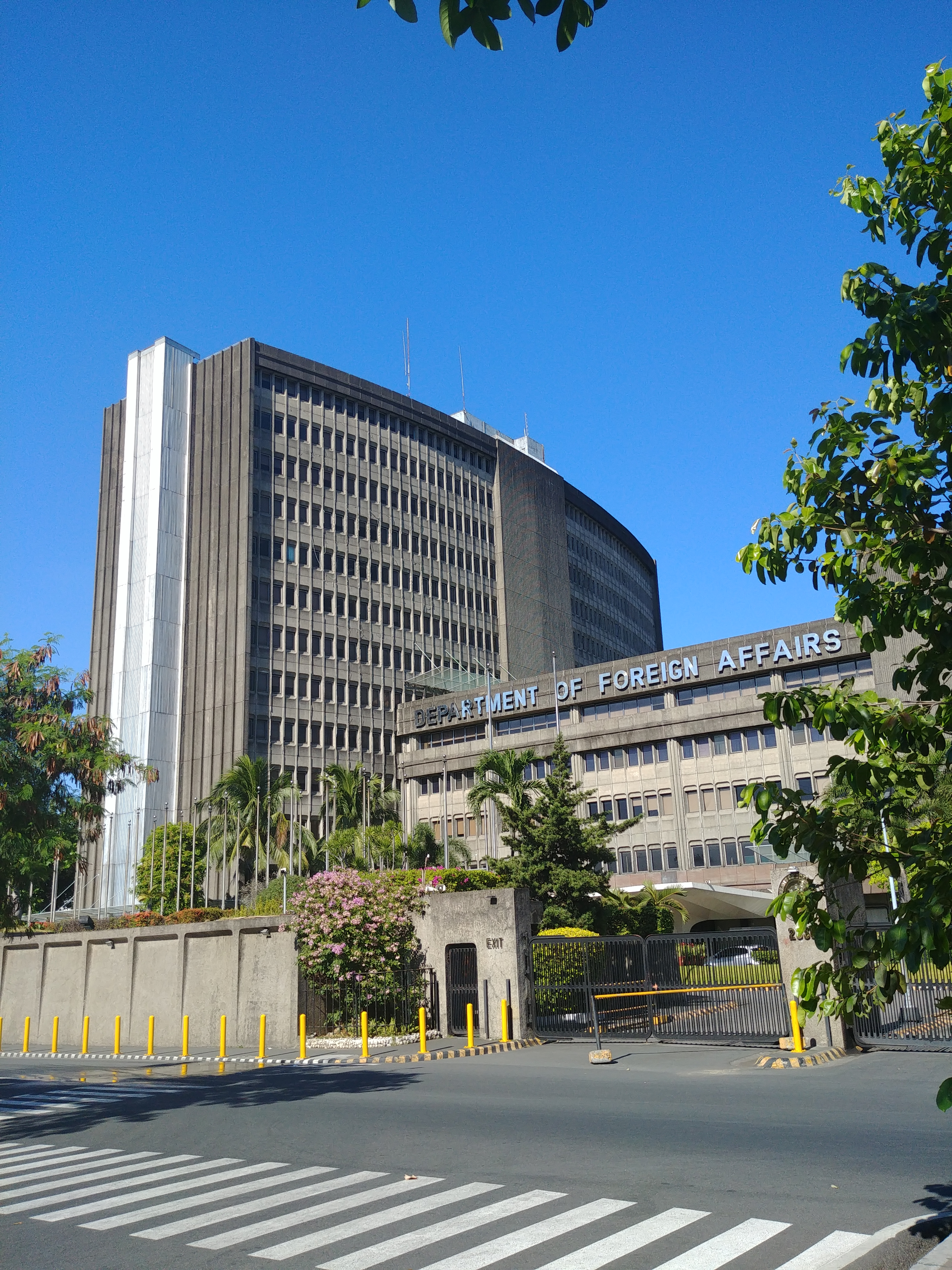
- The Department of Foreign Affairs building along Roxas Boulevard in Pasay (currently undergoing retrofitting as of July 2026)

Department overview
- Formed: June 23, 1898; 128 years ago
- Jurisdiction: Government of the Philippines
- Headquarters: DoubleDragon Tower, EDSA Extension, Pasay City, Philippines (temporary) 2330 Roxas Boulevard, Pasay, Philippines (original); 14°32′48″N 120°59′31″E
- Employees: 2,959 (2024)
- Annual budget: ₱27.384 billion (2025)
- Department executives: Tess Lazaro, Secretary; Maria Teresita Daza, Spokesperson; Robespierre Bolivar, Chief of Staff, Office of the Secretary
- Child agencies: Foreign Service Institute; Technical Cooperation Council of the Philippines; UNESCO National Commission of the Philippines
- Key document: Commonwealth Act No. 732
- Website: www.dfa.gov.ph

The Department of Foreign Affairs (DFA; Filipino: Kagawaran ng Ugnayang Panlabas) is the executive department of the Philippine government tasked to contribute to the enhancement of national security, protection of the territorial integrity and national sovereignty, to participate in the national endeavor of sustaining development and enhancing the Philippines' competitive edge, to protect the rights and promote the welfare of Filipinos overseas and to mobilize them as partners in national development, to project a positive image of the Philippines, and to increase international understanding of Philippine culture for mutually-beneficial relations with other countries.

Secretary Tess Lazaro has headed the department since 2025.

== History ==
=== Post-War Philippines ===
During the period when the Philippines was a colony of the United States, the government did not take an active role in the crafting and execution of its foreign policy. This was also the case during Japan's occupation of the Philippines from 1942 to 1944. The country regained full control of foreign affairs and diplomatic matters on July 4, 1946, when Commonwealth Act No. 732 was passed creating the Department of Foreign Affairs. On September 16, President Manuel Roxas issued Executive Order No. 18, which provided for the organization and operation of the DFA and the Foreign Service. The main tasks of the DFA then were to assist in postwar rehabilitation, formulate policies for the promotion of investment, and re-establish diplomatic relations with neighboring countries.

The DFA had also proposed amendments to the Bell Trade Act, the RP-US Mutual Defense Treaty, and the Laurel-Langley Agreement with the United States, which helped to strengthen trade and military relations with the US, and at the same time initiating the Philippines into the arena of independent foreign policy.

The DFA had its heyday during the post-war years, with its increased participation in the international arena. At that time, the international environment was beginning to change, requiring that new thrusts and priorities in Philippine foreign policy be determined. During the Cold War, against the backdrop of the Korean War in 1950 and rising communism in China, the Philippines projected an increasing internationalist foreign policy. The Philippines helped forge the General Agreement on Tariffs and Trade or GATT in 1949, became a founding member of the United Nations and one of the drafters of the Universal Declaration of Human Rights, and was among the early proponents of disarmament and non-interference in the internal affairs of free peoples. The Philippines' greater participation in global matters culminated in Carlos P. Romulo's election as the first Asian President of the UN General Assembly in 1952.

Realizing the importance of foreign relations, President Elpidio Quirino pushed for the passage of the Foreign Service Law in June 1952, as embodied in Republic Act No. 708. During the post-war period, the Department of Foreign Affairs focused on institution-building, while simultaneously increasing Philippine global exposure. In 1953, Secretary Raul S. Manglapus instituted the Foreign Service Officers (FSOs) examination to professionalize the Foreign Service and improve the recruitment and selection of new FSOs. Such examination and selection processes are notorious, infamous for being difficult, stringent if somewhat opaque - drawing comparisons against similar examinations (Bar, Licensure for Engineers etc.).

=== Under Marcos ===
President Ferdinand Marcos redefined foreign policy as the protection of Philippine independence, territorial integrity and national dignity, and emphasized increased regional cooperation and collaboration. He placed great stress on being Asian and pursued a policy of constructive unity and co-existence with other Asian states, regardless of ideological persuasion. In 1967, the Philippines launched a new initiative to form a regional association with other Southeast Asian countries called the Association of Southeast Asian Nations or ASEAN. It was also during this period that the Philippines normalized economic and diplomatic ties with socialist countries such as China and the USSR, which he visited in 1975 and 1976, respectively. The Philippines also opened embassies in the Eastern Bloc countries, and a separate mission to the European Common Market in Brussels.

Throughout the 1970s, the Ministry of Foreign Affairs pursued the promotion of trade and investment, played an active role in hosting international meetings, and participated in the meetings of the Non-Aligned Movement. The Foreign Service Institute was created in 1976 to provide in-house training to Foreign Service personnel.

=== Post-EDSA 1986 ===
The 1986 EDSA Revolution saw the re-establishment of a democratic government under President Corazon Aquino. During this period, the DFA once again pursued development policy, in the active pursuit of opportunities abroad in the vital areas of trade, investment, finance, technology and aid. The DFA also revived its efforts to boost the Philippine's role in the Asia-Pacific region.

During this period, the Philippines became one of the founding members of the Asia-Pacific Economic Cooperation or APEC in November 1989, and an active player in regional efforts to establish the ASEAN Free Trade Area. In 1990, the DFA proposed the establishment of more diplomatic missions to the Middle East to improve existing ties with Arab states and to respond to the growing needs of Overseas Filipino Workers in the region.

In 1991, the Philippine Senate, heeding the growing nationalist sentiments among the public, voted against the extension of the Military Bases Agreement. This symbolized the severance of the political and ideological ties which had long linked the country to the United States. Also in 1991, President Aquino signed into law Republic Act 7157, otherwise known as the New Foreign Service Law, which reorganized and strengthened the Foreign Service. It instituted a Career Minister Eligibility Examination as a requirement for promotion of Foreign Service Officers (FSOs) to the rank of Minister Counsellor, thereby ensuring the professional selection of those who would eventually rise to the level of career ambassadors. In the same year, the DFA transferred its offices from the former Library Building of the University of the Philippines Manila in Ermita, Manila, to the Asian Development Bank's old headquarters along Roxas Boulevard in Pasay. The Supreme Court of the Philippines took over the library building, while the ADB moved to Ortigas Center in Mandaluyong (but in close proximity to Pasig).

=== Under Fidel V. Ramos ===
The administration of Fidel Ramos from July 1992 to June 1998 defined four core areas of Philippine foreign policy: the enhancement of national security, promotion of economic diplomacy, protecting Overseas Filipino Workers and Filipino nationals abroad, the projection of a good image of the country abroad.

The Migrant Workers and Overseas Filipinos Act of 1995 provided the framework for stronger protection of Filipino workers abroad, with the creation of the Legal Assistance Fund and the Assistance-to-Nationals Fund, and the designation in the DFA of a Legal Assistant for Migrant Workers' Affairs, with the rank of Undersecretary.

Among the other significant events in foreign affairs during the Ramos years were the adoption by ASEAN in 1992, upon Philippine initiative, of the Declaration on the South China Sea, aimed at confidence-building and the avoidance of conflict among claimant states; the establishment of the Brunei, Indonesia, Malaysia, and the Philippines (BIMP)-East Asia Growth area in 1994; the establishment of the ASEAN Regional Forum (ARF) in 1994 as the only multilateral security dialogue in the Asia-Pacific region conducted at the government level, and the signing between the Philippine Government and the MNLF on September 2, 1996, of the Mindanao Peace Agreement.

=== Estrada administration ===
The administration of Joseph Estrada upheld the foreign policy thrusts of the previous administration, focusing on national security, economic diplomacy, assistance to nationals, and image-building. The Philippines continued to be at the forefront of the regional and multilateral arena. It successfully hosted the ASEAN Ministerial Meeting in July 1998 and undertook confidence-building measures with China over South China Sea issue through a meeting in March 1999. President Estrada strengthened bilateral ties with neighboring countries with visits to Vietnam, Thailand, Malaysia, Singapore, Hong Kong, Japan, and South Korea.

The DFA also played a major role in the forging of a Visiting Forces Agreement with the United States, which was ratified in the Senate. The country also sent a delegation of 108 observers to the Indonesian parliamentary elections, and engaged in cooperative activities in the areas of security, defense, combating transnational crimes, economy, culture, and the protection of OFWs and Filipinos abroad.

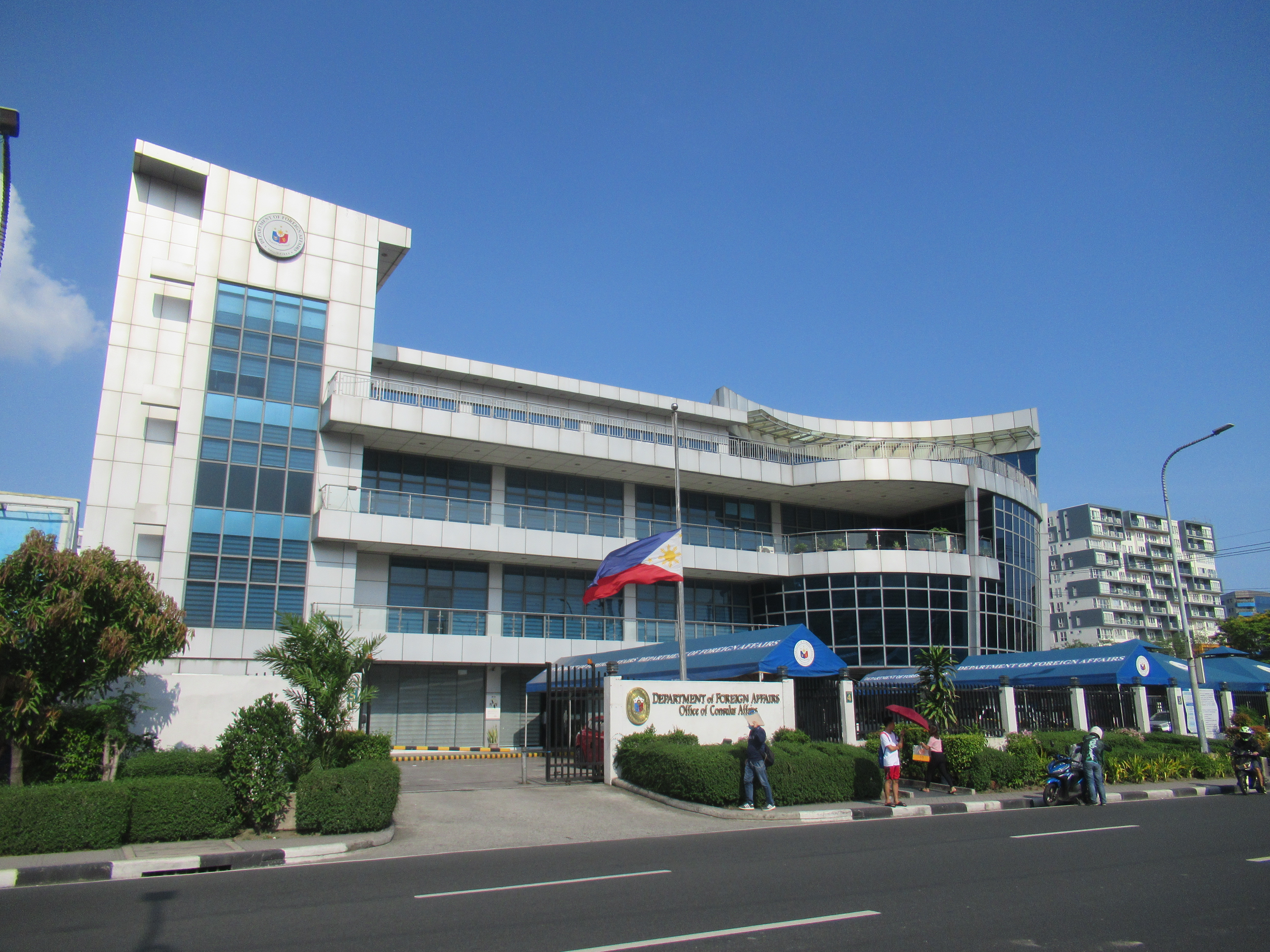
Department of Foreign Affairs - Office of Consular Affairs

== Organizational structure ==
The department is headed by the Secretary of Foreign Affairs (Philippines), with the following undersecretaries:

- Undersecretary for Administration
- Undersecretary for Civilian Security and Consular Affairs
- Undersecretary for Multilateral Affairs and International Economic Relations
- Undersecretary for Migration Affairs
- Undersecretary for Bilateral Relations and ASEAN Affairs

== Offices of the department ==
The policy and geographic offices of the DFA manage political and economic relations in different regions and pursue Philippine interests in multilateral organizations. These include the following:

- Office of International Economic Relations
- Office of American Affairs
- Office of Asian and Pacific Affairs
- Office of European Affairs
- Office of Middle East and African Affairs
- Office of ASEAN Affairs
- Office of United Nations and International Organizations
- Maritime and Ocean Affairs Office

The DFA's line offices are the following:

- Office of Migrant Workers Affairs
- Office of Consular Affairs
- Office of Civilian Security
- Office of Public and Cultural Diplomacy
- Office of Treaties and Legal Affairs
- Office of Policy Planning and Coordination
- Office of Protocol
- Office of Fiscal Management Services
- Office of Asset Management and Support Services
- Human Resource Management Office
- Intelligence and Security Unit
- Department Legislative Liaison Unit
- Internal Audit Service

== See also ==
- Foreign relations of the Philippines
- List of diplomatic missions of the Philippines
- List of diplomatic missions in the Philippines
