= Palestine–Philippines relations =

- Palestine: Philippines

Diplomatic mission
- ,Embassy of the State of Palestine, Makati: Embassy of the Philippines, Amman

Envoy
- Ambassador Mounir Y.K. Anastas: Ambassador Wilfredo C. Santos

Palestine–Philippines relations refer to foreign relations between the State of Palestine and the Republic of the Philippines. The two nations have many common points that experts say they should capitalize on with the aim of enhancing bilateral relations. They are members of the Asia Cooperation Dialogue, Group of 77 and the Non-Aligned Movement.

== History ==
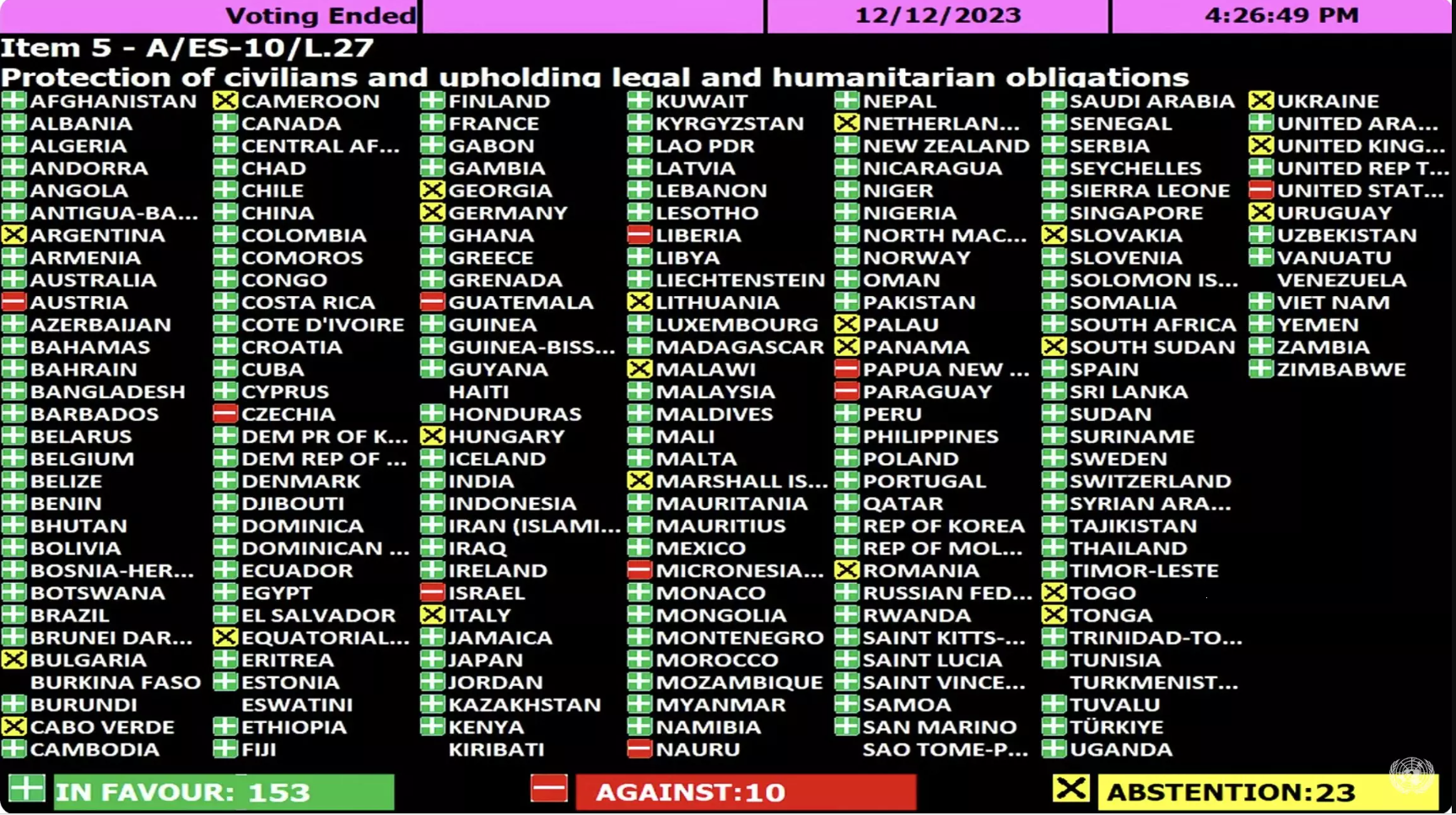
153 countries, including the Philippines, supported the resolution calling for a ceasefire in Gaza that was overwhelmingly passed by the UN General Assembly on 12 December 2023

The Philippines voted in favor of UN Resolution 181 recommending the partition of Palestine and the establishment of a Jewish state in 1947. The Philippines was among the 33 countries who supported the establishment of Israel and the only Asian country who voted for the resolution.

The Philippines established diplomatic relations with Palestine on 4 September 1989, recognizing Palestinian statehood.

The Philippines was among the 138 countries that voted in favor of the United Nations General Assembly resolution 67/19 recognizing Palestine as a non-member state. "The Philippines supports Palestine's quest for self-rule and self-determination, and we hope that one day an independent Palestine may live side by side in peace with its neighbors," Department of Foreign Affairs (DFA) spokesperson Raul Hernandez wrote in a text message.

On 22 June 2016, shortly before the release of the Permanent Court of Arbitration's ruling on the South China Sea Arbitration case, Abbas Zaki, Fatah central committee member and the party's representative to China, expressed support for China's territorial claims over the disputed waters and criticized the Philippines for involving international legal institutions in resolving the dispute.

Philippine president Rodrigo Duterte said on 20 June 2020 that the Philippines will maintain "friendly and cooperative" relations with five nations, including Palestine. Along with welcoming Saleh Asad Saleh Fhied Mohammad, the first Palestinian ambassador to the Philippines, Duterte also saw the reopening of Palestine's embassy in Manila.

Enrique Manalo, the Philippines' then-envoy to the UN, made the following statement on 25 May 2021, in front of the UN General Assembly: "The Philippines has always expressed support for the creation of the State of Palestine living in peace and security with its neighbors." The Philippines reiterated its support for a two-state solution in this area.

Following the 7 October Hamas attacks on Israel where four Filipinos were among those killed and two more were among those taken hostage, the Philippines abstained from voting for a United Nations General Assembly resolution calling for a humanitarian truce in Gaza, due to the lack of explicit condemnation on Hamas' initial attacks on October 7.

On 12 December 2023, a UN resolution calling for an immediate humanitarian ceasefire and the unconditional release of all hostages in Gaza received support from the Philippines. During the emergency special session of the UN General Assembly, Philippine permanent representative to the UN Antonio Manuel Lagdameo stated that although the Philippines denounced the 7 October attacks carried out by Hamas, the country feels that it is imperative to follow international humanitarian law, particularly the principles of proportionality and distinction in response to security threats.

On 24 September 2026, Philippine diplomats joined a walkout during Israeli prime minister Benjamin Netanyahu's address to the general debate of the eighty-first session of the United Nations General Assembly. The Philippine DFA said the move reflected its concerns over the humanitarian situation in Gaza and Israeli settlement activities in the West Bank. On 28 September, the Palestinian embassy in Manila thanked the Philippines for participating in the walkout and welcomed its continued support for a two-state solution.

== Economic relations ==
The Philippines sold products worth US$550 thousand to Palestine in 2021. Computers ($395 thousand), shaving goods ($48.5 thousand), and vegetable saps ($27.6 thousand) were the top exports from the Philippines to Palestine. The Philippines' exports to Palestine have grown at an average rate of 1.22% over the past 14 years, from $402 thousand in 2007 to $550 thousand in 2021.

As of 2024, there are around 100 Overseas Filipino Workers or migrant workers in Palestine while there are 30,000 in Israel.

== Diplomatic missions ==
- Palestine has an embassy in Makati, Metro Manila.
- The Philippine embassy in Amman, Jordan, is accredited to Palestine.

== See also ==
- Foreign relations of Palestine
- Foreign relations of the Philippines
- International recognition of Palestine
- Israel–Philippines relations
