= Rommel Romato =

Filipino diplomat (born 1981)

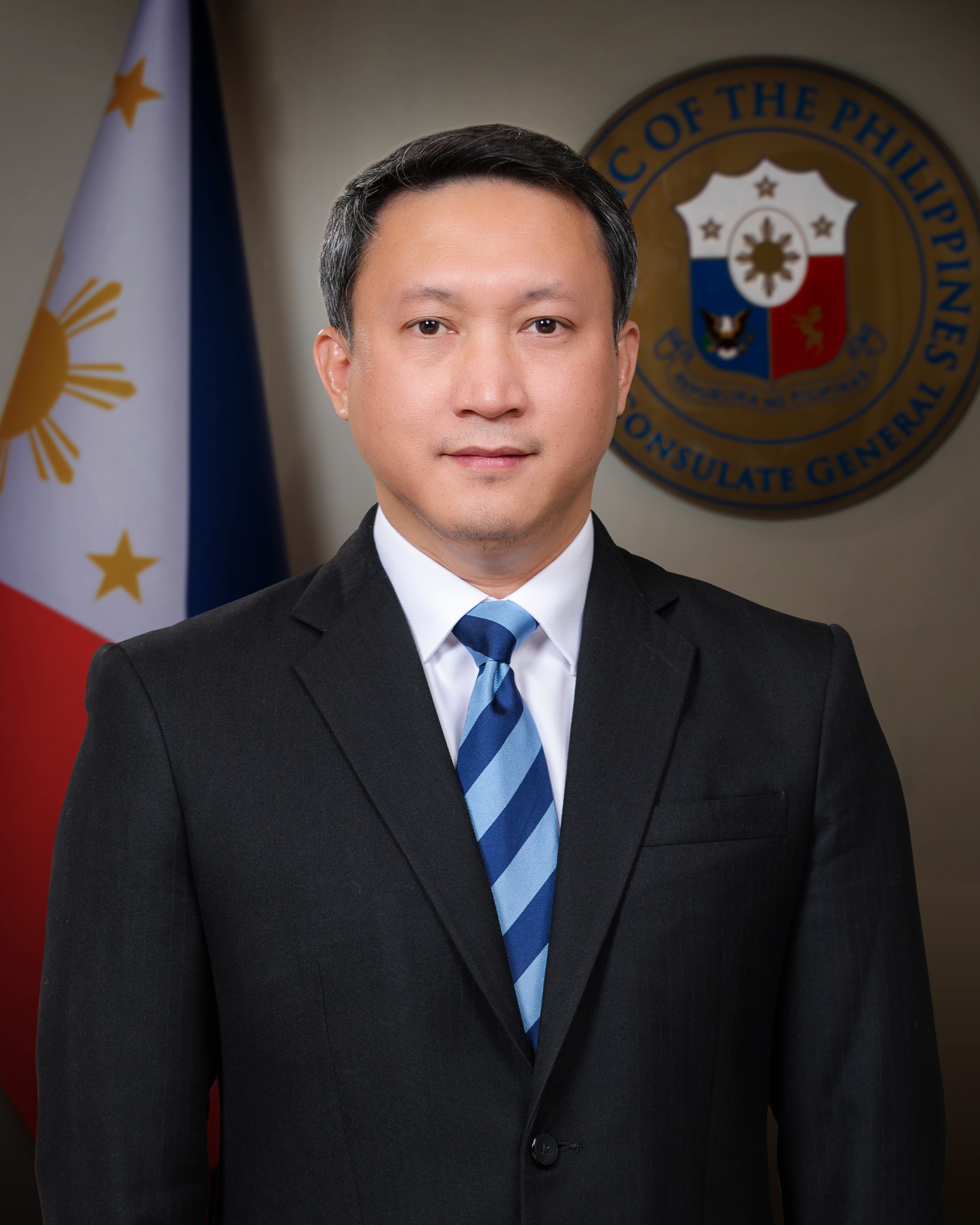

Philippine Consul General in Jeddah
- Incumbent
- Assumed office February 14, 2025
- President: Bongbong Marcos
- Preceded by: Edgar Tomas Auxilian

Philippine Chargé d'affaires to Saudi Arabia
- In office July 1, 2022 – February 6, 2025
- President: Bongbong Marcos
- Preceded by: Adnan Alonto (as Ambassador)
- Succeeded by: Raymond Balatbat (as Ambassador)

Personal details
- Born: 1981 (age 44–45)
- Spouse: Dr Nizhreen Mapandi-Romato
- Education: University of the Philippines Diliman (BA), Linacre College, Oxford (MSt)

Rommel Ariman Romato (locally [roˈmɛl aɾiˈman roˈmatuː]; born 1981) is a Filipino diplomat and the current Consul General of the Republic of the Philippines in Jeddah, Kingdom of Saudi Arabia. He previously served as the chargé d'affaires ad interim of the Republic of the Philippines to Saudi Arabia from July 2022 to February 2025.

== Early life and education ==
Romato was born in 1981 in Marawi City, Philippines. He obtained a Bachelor of Arts in philosophy from the University of the Philippines Diliman where he became the first Muslim student to be elected chairperson of the UP Diliman University of Student Council.

He gained a Master of Studies in Diplomatic Studies from the University of Oxford and won the Ralph Feltham Prize for his research on maritime piracy around the Horn of Africa. During his time at Oxford, he co-founded the Oxford Philippines Society. He also attended The Hague Academy of International Law.

== Career ==
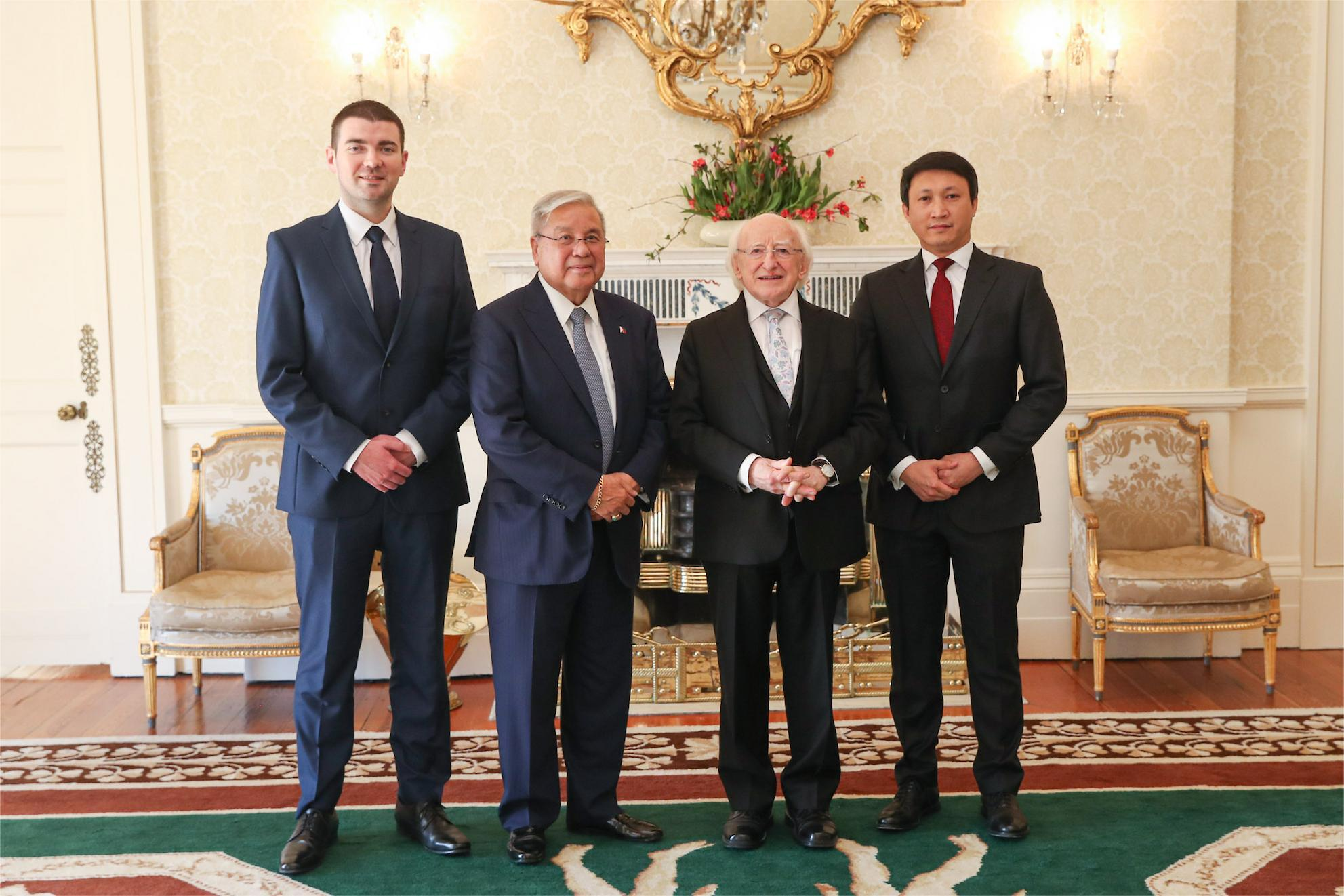
Romato with President Michael D. Higgins at the presentation of credentials by Ambassador Antonio Lagdameo at Áras an Uachtaráin, Dublin, April 19, 2018.

Romato is a career member of the Foreign Service of the Philippines. He joined the Department of Foreign Affairs in 2009 after serving as a legal researcher at the Office of the Ombudsman from 2004 to 2009. From 2012 to 2013, he was seconded to the United Nations' International Maritime Organization. From 2013 to 2019, he served at the Philippine Embassy in London and contributed to the establishment of Philippines studies at SOAS University of London. In 2021, he was assigned as Consul General at the Philippine Embassy in Riyadh, which he later led as chargé d'affaires ad interim from 2022 to 2025.

Chargé d'affaires to Saudi Arabia

In September 2022, Romato received an official visit by Secretary Susan Ople of the Department of Migrant Workers. During the visit, Secretary Ople held successful meetings with Saudi officials leading to the lifting of the Philippine Government's deployment ban of workers to Saudi Arabia and negotiations on improving working conditions of nearly a million overseas Filipino workers in the Kingdom. He met with Secretary-General Jassem Mohamed Albudaiwi of the Gulf Cooperation Council (GCC) on February 26, 2023, to discuss ways to strengthen GCC-Philippines relations in areas such as security, welfare of migrant workers, trade, and tourism.

On October 19–20, 2023, Chargé d'affaires Romato oversaw the official visit of President Bongbong Marcos to Saudi Arabia to attend the inaugural ASEAN-GCC Summit in Riyadh. During this visit, President Marcos also met with Crown Prince Mohammed bin Salman, the Prime Minister of Saudi Arabia.

Chargé d'affaires Romato facilitated Philippine Department of Trade and Industry-led business missions to Saudi Arabia from 2024 to 2025 and spearheaded the establishment of the Philippine Trade and Investment Center (PTIC) at the Embassy, along with the appointment of a Philippine commercial attaché in Riyadh on November 1, 2024.

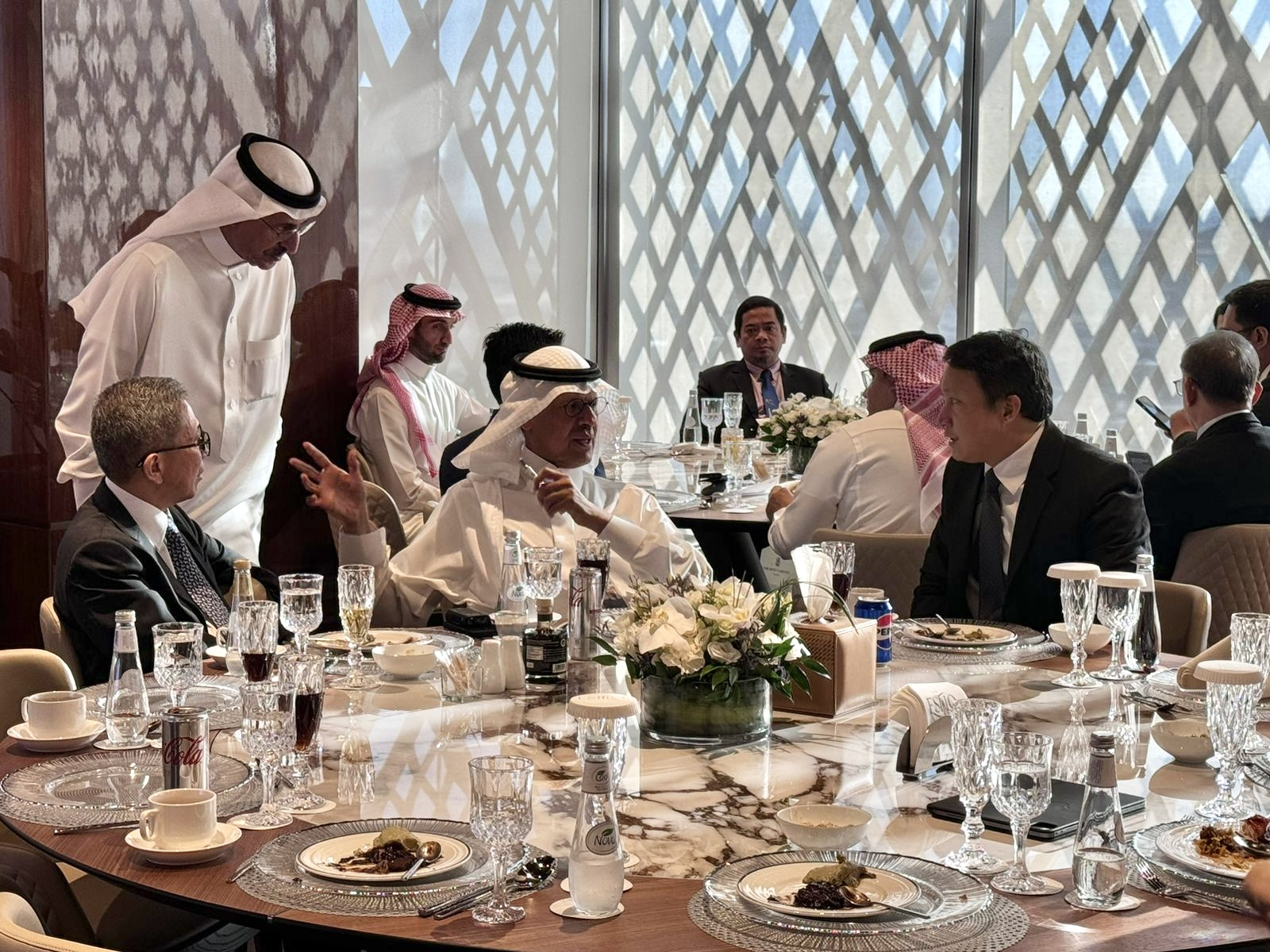
Romato (right) with Saudi Minister of Energy Prince Abdulaziz bin Salman Al Saud who hosted a luncheon in honor of Philippine Energy Secretary Raphael Lotilla (left) in Riyadh, October 14, 2024.

In March 2024, Romato along with embassy officials travelled to Aden, Yemen to meet intermediaries in efforts to secure the release of the crew (including 17 Filipino seafarers) of the MV Galaxy Leader, who were later released on January 21, 2025, after 430 days in captivity.

Romato welcomed Secretary Raphael Lotilla of the Department of Energy to Riyadh in October 2024 for his meetings with his Saudi counterpart Prince Abdulaziz bin Salman Al Saud and Minister of Investment Khalid al-Falih and for the signing of the first memorandum of understanding (MOU) on energy cooperation between the Philippines and Saudi Arabia.

== Personal life ==
Romato is married to physician Nizhreen Mapandi-Romato. They have four children.
