= Kidnapping of Angelo dela Cruz =

2004 kidnapping of a Filipino worker

- Location: Fallujah, Iraq (abduction)
- Date: July 7–20, 2004 (1 week and 6 days)
- Attack type: Kidnapping
- Victim: Angelo dela Cruz
- Perpetrator: Khalid ibn al-Walid Corps - Islamic Army in Iraq
- Motive: Withdrawal of Philippine contingent in Iraq

The kidnapping of Angelo dela Cruz, a Filipino Overseas Filipino Worker working in Iraq, is an event that led to the withdrawal of Filipino soldiers from the Multi-National Force – Iraq, a United States-led multinational coalition which was a participant in the Iraq War.

The kidnapping incident led to the withdrawal of the Philippines from the coalition and a deployment ban for Filipino workers seeking to work in Iraq.

== Background ==
=== Situation ===
The Philippines was part of the Multi-National Force – Iraq, a United States-led multinational coalition participating in the Iraq War. At the time, there were 51 Filipino soldiers stationed in Iraq while about 4,000 civilians were working in the country, primarily under contract with military bases of the United States. The Philippine government has planned to withdraw its contingent from the coalition by August 2004.

=== Abductee ===
Angelo dela Cruz was an Overseas Filipino Worker or a migrant worker who served as a driver for a Saudi Arabian company before his kidnapping. He was working with the United States Army as part of his job. A native of Pampanga, dela Cruz at the time of his abduction was 46 years old and a father of three children. Prior to working in Iraq, he worked in Saudi Arabia for 15 years.

== Kidnapping ==
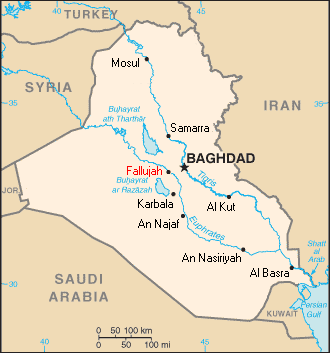
Dela Cruz was kidnapped in Fallujah

Angelo dela Cruz was kidnapped near Fallujah while transporting fuel from Saudi Arabia on July 7, 2004 and later appeared in a broadcast by Al Jazeera pleading for his life.

The kidnappers of dela Cruz, identified themselves as members of the Khaled Bin Al-Walid Squadrons which is part of the militant group, Islamic Army of Iraq and demanded the Philippine government to withdraw its 50-person contingent from the United States-led multinational coalition in Iraq "as soon as possible". They demand that the Philippine contingent to be withdrawn from Iraq and that the Philippine government come up with a decision by July 10. The Philippines then confirmed that they will withdraw its contingent on August 20 and claimed that dela Cruz has been released and will be dropped off in a hotel in Baghdad. Al Jazeera reports that the militants have denied such claims.

They set July 13, 2004 as the new deadline for an agreement with the Philippine government. They demand that the Philippine contingent to be withdrawn from Iraq by July 20.

Following a five-hour cabinet meeting on July 12, then-Secretary Delia Albert of the Department of Foreign Affairs said that the Philippine government will not comply with the militants demands. At the day of the deadline, Al Jazeera reported that the militants has taken dela Cruz to a location where his "punishment" will be meted out. Dela Cruz reportedly requested the kidnappers a one-day extension so he could extend a message to the President of the Philippines and that his corpse be delivered to his country's government.

The kidnappers later extended the deadline by 24 hours The Philippine government then agreed to comply with the militants demands. They announced that dela Cruz was released on July 17 though it was only on July 20 that dela Cruz was released by his captors.

== Aftermath ==
=== Philippine withdrawal from the coalition ===
The Philippine government publicly announced on July 16, 2004, that Philippine contingent will be withdrawn from Iraq "shortly". At the time of the announcement, the Filipino soldiers were already in Kuwait and were scheduled to be flown to Metro Manila by July 19. The government has withdrawn its contingent a month earlier than planned.

The move was criticized by the Philippines' allies. Then-Australian Prime Minister John Howard, while remarking that he does not want to be "harsh on a friend", describe the Philippines' move to withdraw its contingent earlier than planned as a "mistake" that would not "buy" the Southeast Asian country "immunity". He acknowledge the crisis resulting from the kidnapping incident as a "wretched state of affairs" and said that giving in to the militant's demands won't stop similar occurrence from happening again.

Iraq and the United States also criticized the move. Then-White House spokesman Scott McClellan also expressed disappointment of the move which he says "sends the wrong signal to terrorists". Gen. John Abizaid of United States Central Command in reaction to the move said that if one "appease terrorism", one "will sooner or later fall victim to it or be taken over by it".

The militant group then issued a web message to the Japanese government to withdraw its 500-person contingent from Iraq as well threatening them with "lines of cars laden with explosives" and urged Japan to "Do what the Philippines has done".

=== Release of dela Cruz ===
After Philippine compliance to the militant groups demands, dela Cruz was released. He was dropped off at the United Arab Emirates embassy in the Mansour district of Baghdad. President Gloria Macapagal Arroyo hailed the releasing and dubbed dela Cruz as the "Filipino everyman, a symbol of the hardworking Filipino seeking hope and opportunity" and remarked that she will not regret her government's decision in handling the incident. The United States embassy in Manila congratulated the Philippines for the release without referencing the compliance of the Philippine government to the terms laid by militants.

Pacific Strategies and Assessments, a firm based in the United States, said that the move of Arroyo's administration is to preempt possible backlash from the Overseas Filipino Workers community that identifies themselves with dela Cruz. The firm also said the move was to boost domestic public opinion for Arroyo who just won re-election in the 2004 presidential elections which was marred by controversy.

=== Iraq worker deployment ban by the Philippines ===
Shortly after the return of dela Cruz to the Philippines, the Philippine government issued a deployment ban of Filipino migrant workers to Iraq. The Department of Foreign Affairs then issued passports that explicitly mentions the ban.

Iraq has urged the Philippines to lift its ban so that Filipino workers can be involved in the rehabilitation of the country. The ban was partially lifted in July 2013, allowing Filipinos except domestic workers to work in Iraq though Filipinos were still barred in working in the Anbar, Nineveh, Kirkuk, and Salahuddin Governorates.

=== Post-kidnapping life of dela Cruz ===
Then-President Gloria Macapagal Arroyo provided a new house for Angelo dela Cruz and his family at the Benjamin subdivision in Mexico, Pampanga and his eight children were provided with scholarship by Arroyo. He briefly worked in California, after he was brought in to the United States by his uncle. He returned to the Philippines after he was left bored due to being confined in an office workplace most of the time and found it unsustainable to remain unemployed in the United States. He also received a P200 thousand aid from the OWWA Regional Welfare Administration which he used to buy a jeepney.

Dela Cruz, as of 2011, worked as a passenger van driver plying the Mexico-Angeles City route. As of 2014, he remains as a van driver. He offered services to his neighborhood such as clearing inconsistencies in birth certificate and passport application. He also ran as town councilor at an unspecified date under the Lakas-NUCD party with a platform focusing on the needs of Overseas Filipino Workers but lost.

In 2011, he called for the lifting of ban of deployment of Filipino migrant workers to Iraq.

Angelo Dela Cruz died on July 5, 2021, two days prior to the 17th anniversary of his abduction.

== See also ==
- Iraq-Philippines relations
