= Iraq–Philippines relations =

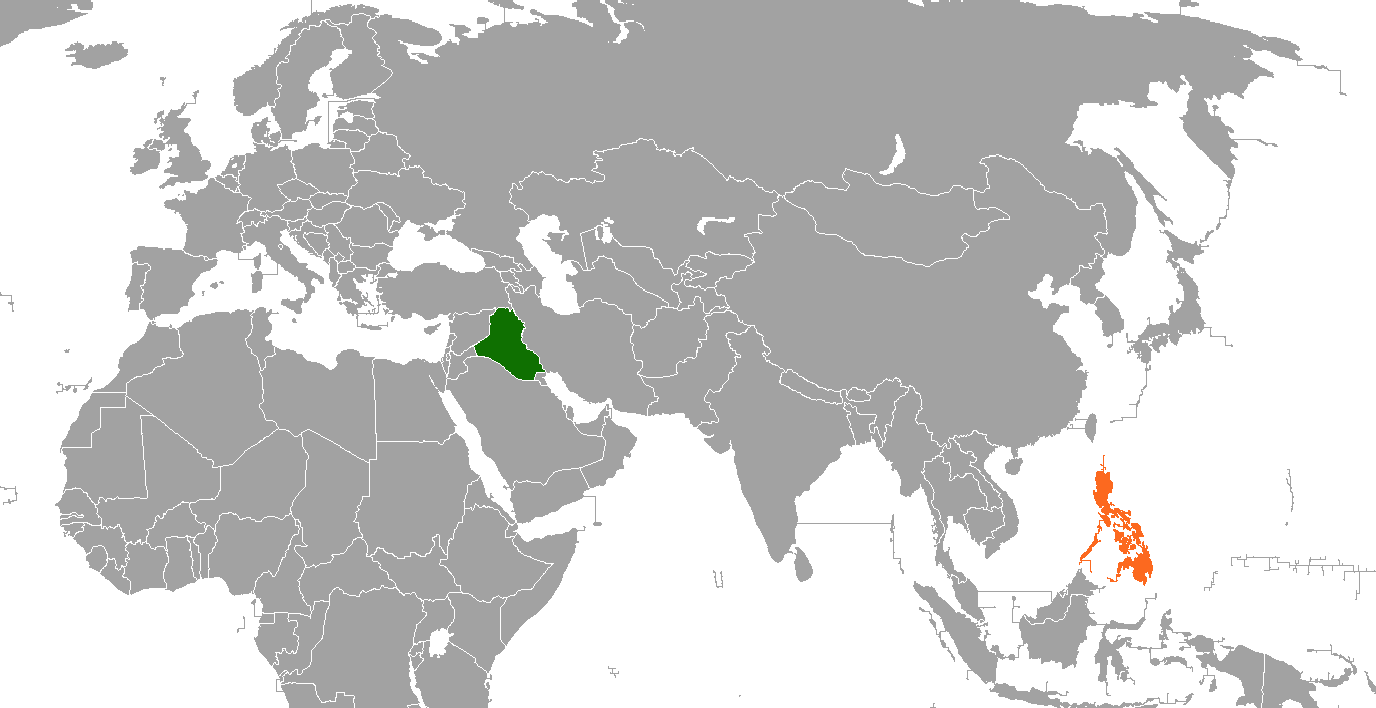

- Iraq: Philippines

Iraq–Philippines relations refers to the bilateral ties between Iraq and the Philippines. Formal relations were established on January 12, 1975.

== Diplomatic mission ==
The Philippines and Iraq formally established diplomatic relations on January 12, 1975, with the opening of the Iraqi Embassy in Manila. This was followed by the opening of the Philippine Embassy in Baghdad on September 9, 1980. Due to security concerns, the Philippines moved its embassy to Amman in Jordan in 2004 while Iraq closed its embassy in Manila in September 2003. The Philippine Embassy returned to its chancery in Baghdad in November 2011.

== Iraq War ==
The Philippines contributed troops to the United States-led Multi-National Force in Iraq in 2003. After an Overseas Filipino Worker by the name of Angelo dela Cruz was kidnapped and threatened with death by militants, the Philippine Government decided to move the scheduled end of the tour of duty of its contingent a few weeks early. Iraq and the United States expressed their disapproval for the withdrawal and described it as "giving in to terrorist demands", despite respecting the Philippines decision on the matter.

== Labor relations ==
Due to security concerns, the Philippines banned the deployment of workers to Iraq in December 2007. The Philippines partially lifted its ban in 2012 by sending workers to Iraqi Kurdistan. In 2013, the Philippines lifted the ban on the deployment of workers to Iraq except to the Iraqi provinces of Anbar, Nineveh and Kirkuk. In 2014, the Philippines imposed a total deployment ban to Iraq following the capture by the Daesh of Mosul and other key cities in Iraq. The ban was partially lifted in 2018 to allow the return of workers from vacation under the Balik Manggagawa Program. In 2020, the total ban on all Filipino workers, notably household service workers, was reinstated, during the US-Iran conflict following the assassination of Qasem Sulaimani and Iran's retaliation with missiles towards US facilities in Iraq in 2020. A mandatory repatriation of Filipinos was undertaken by Philippine Embassy in Iraq's Chargè d’Affairès Jomar T. Sadie.

A total of 1,640 Filipinos live and work in Iraq. Documented workers number at 1,190 while undocumented workers are estimated at 450, many of whom are victims of human trafficking. In 2019 Chargè d’Affairès Sadie pushed for the adoption of a Memorandum of Understanding (MOU) on Combating Human Trafficking that will cover protection of victims, and prosecution of perpetrators.

== Resident diplomatic missions ==
- Iraq has an embassy in Manila.
- The Philippines has an embassy in Baghdad.

== See also ==
- Foreign relations of Iraq
- Foreign relations of the Philippines
