= Embassy of the Philippines, Baghdad =

Diplomatic mission of the Philippines in Iraq

Embassy of the Philippines, Baghdad Pasuguan ng Pilipinas sa Baghdad سفارة الفلبين في بغداد

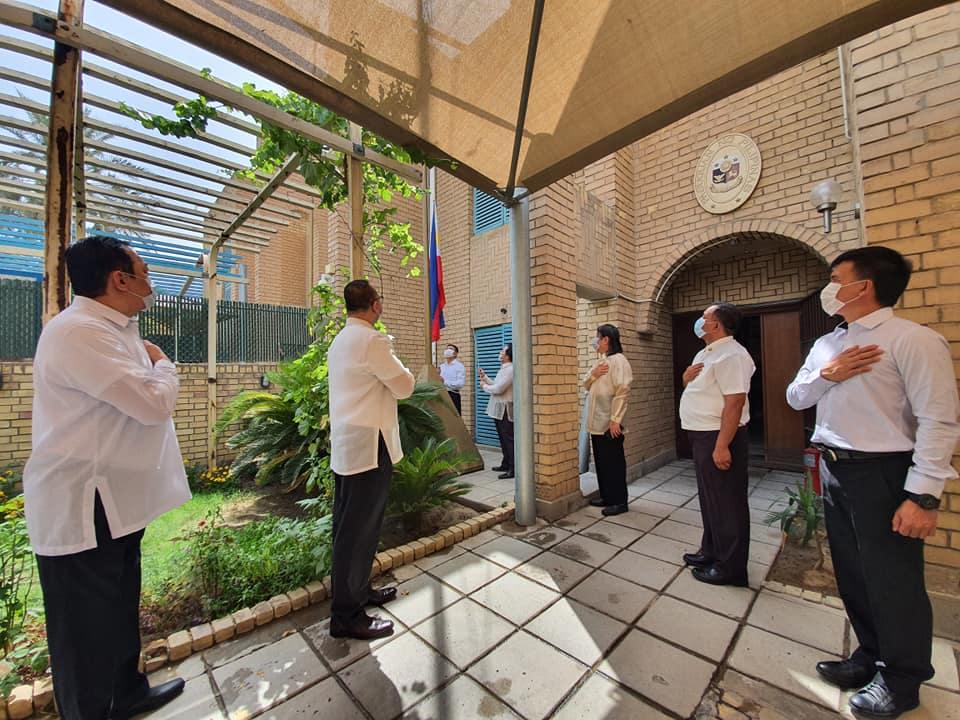
- Location: Baghdad
- Address: House No. 4, Zukak No. 22, Mahalat 915, Al-Jadriya, Karrada District
- Coordinates: 33°17′8.5″N 44°23′3.3″E
- Ambassador: Charlie P. Manangan
- Website: baghdadpe.dfa.gov.ph

The Embassy of the Philippines in Baghdad is the diplomatic mission of the Republic of the Philippines to the Republic of Iraq. Opened in 1980, it is located in the Al-Jadriya neighborhood of the Karrada district in eastern Baghdad, near the main campus of the University of Baghdad.

== History ==
The Philippine Embassy in Baghdad was opened on September 19, 1980, five years after the Philippines and Iraq established diplomatic relations on January 12, 1975.

Operations of the embassy were affected by the Iraq War. On February 9, 2003, National Security Adviser Roilo Golez disclosed to the press that President Gloria Macapagal Arroyo ordered the embassy's closure owing to the impending war, which Press Secretary Ignacio Bunye promptly denied the next day. However, by the following March the Department of Foreign Affairs (DFA) had announced that it was ready to close the embassy at any time the United States were to invade the country. Although most staff had already been evacuated to Amman, the capital of neighboring Jordan, officials later mentioned that the embassy would initially remain open with a skeletal staff complement even after U.S. troops arriving in Iraq. The worsening security situation in Iraq at the time would eventually lead to its full relocation to Amman by June 30, 2005, with Iraqi employees continuing to provide services to Filipinos in Iraq from the main chancery in Baghdad. Filipino diplomats, on the other hand, would be based out of an embassy satellite office in Amman, with the DFA making monthly assessments based on U.S. intelligence reports to determine when it would be safe to fully reopen.

The DFA began considering fully reopening the embassy in 2008 owing to improving conditions in Iraq at the time, a position reaffirmed by Vice President Noli de Castro early the following year. Concrete measures to reopen the mission, however, were not made until the administration of Benigno Aquino III, when Iraq requested the embassy's reopening in September 2011, and the DFA dispatched a delegation headed by Foreign Affairs Undersecretary Rafael Seguis to Baghdad to discuss this and other issues with Iraqi officials. The embassy fully relocated back to Baghdad in November 2011, capped with a visit by Foreign Affairs Secretary Albert del Rosario to Iraq in January 2012.

== Staff and activities ==
The Philippine Embassy in Baghdad is headed by Ambassador Charlie P. Manangan, who was appointed to the position by President Bongbong Marcos on July 25, 2023. Prior to his appointment as ambassador, Manangan, a career diplomat, served as an assistant secretary at the DFA, and before that served as deputy chief of mission at the Philippine Embassy to the Holy See. His appointment was confirmed by the Commission on Appointments on September 13, 2023, and he presented his credentials to Iraqi President Abdul Latif Rashid on February 12, 2024.

Many of the embassy's activities center around ensuring and safeguarding the welfare of the thousands of Filipinos in Iraq. It has reminded Filipinos to be vigilant owing to the country's volatile security situation, and it has conducted repatriations back to the Philippines when the security situation warrants it. Because many Filipinos in Iraq are undocumented, the embassy has also begun issuing IDs to Filipinos in Iraq to more accurately determine how many there are in the country. Beyond these functions, the embassy has also engaged in other activities, such as gathering letters from overseas Filipinos and even some Iraqis in support of Philippine troops fighting in the siege of Marawi.

On December 10, 2021, six Filipino diplomats who were serving at the embassy in 2015 revealed that they had consented to a suicide pact. Led by Elmer G. Cato, at the time serving as the mission's chargé d'affaires en pied, the diplomats promised to defend the embassy or die together rather than be taken hostage by Islamic State (IS) insurgents despite the worsening situation in Iraq at the height of the country's war against IS.

== See also ==
- List of diplomatic missions of the Philippines
- List of diplomatic missions in Iraq
- Iraq–Philippines relations
