= UP Diliman University Student Council =

Official student representative body of University of the Philippines Diliman

University of the Philippines Diliman University Student Council Konseho ng Mag-aaral ng Unibersidad ng Pilipinas Diliman
- Academic Year 2026-2027

Type
- Type: Representative body of the students of University of the Philippines Diliman
- Term limits: None

Leadership
- Chairperson: Janina Moira "Emi" Alfonso (Independent; Sulong Tayo Coalition)
- Vice Chairperson: Maria Fatima Mendoza (Independent; Sulong Tayo Coalition)

Structure
- Seats: 32
- Political groups: Student Alliance for the Advancement of Democratic Rights in UP (STAND UP): seats; Independent: seats; Alyansa ng mga Mag-aaral para sa Panlipunang Katwiran at Kaunlaran (ALYANSA): seat
- Committees: Secretariat (SEC); Finance (FIN); Ways and Means (WAM); Mass Media (MMC); Sports, Fitness and Health (SPOFIH); Career Assistance (CAC); Environmental Concerns (ECC); Legal Issues and Concerns (CLIC); Community Rights and Welfare (CRAW); Culture and the Arts (COCA); Gender and Development (GAD); Orgs, Frats and Soros (COFS); Basic Student Services (BSS); Education and Research (EdRes); Students with Additional Needs Services (SWANS); Safety and Security (SAS); People's Struggles (PeopStrug); Students Rights and Welfare (STRAW); Good Governance (GG)
- Length of term: One academic year

Elections
- Voting system: First past the post
- First election: 1913
- Last election: May 20-21, 2026

Meeting place
- 3/F Student Union Building Vinzon's Hall University of the Philippines Diliman Quezon City

The University Student Council of the University of the Philippines Diliman (Filipino: Konseho ng Mag-aaral ng Unibersidad ng Pilipinas Diliman) is the official student representative body of the University of the Philippines Diliman. The University Student Council, also known as USC, exists to represent UP students in various affairs of the University, acting as the voice of UP students in the local, national, and international issues.

As the highest representative of the student body in the Diliman campus, the USC is composed of members elected amongst the student body, mandated to organize and direct campaigns and activities to defend and promote students’ rights, and improve the students’ general welfare. Furthermore, it provides direct services to the student body.

== Structure ==
=== Governance ===
The USC is composed of the following officers: Chairperson (who is chief executive officer), Vice Chairperson (who is convenor of the League of College Councils or LCC), and twelve (12) University Councilors, all elected at large. In addition, each degree granting college is represented in the USC by a College Representative(s).

The chairperson supervises the standing and special standing committees of the USC, which is organized at the beginning of each term.

The standing committees of the USC are:

- Secretariat Committee headed by the Secretary General
- Finance Committee headed by the Treasurer
- Ways and Means Committee headed by the Business Manager
- Mass Media Committee headed by the Public Relations Officer

=== Finances ===
The USC is financed by the compulsory Student Fund generated from the fees collected from students upon registration, sponsorships from the activities, and donations. It also receives grants for specific projects and activities.

== History ==
=== 1913-1950 ===
The Student Council of UP was instituted in 1913 under the auspices of UP President Barlett. Manuel Tabora of the UP College of Law was the first Chairman of the Student Council. On October 6, 1913, the USC participated in the popular demonstration in honor of Governor General Francis Burton Harrison.

On December 15, 1917, the first student protest took place against a Manila police captain and his men for arresting Victoriano Yamzon during the first University Day. The police mistook the first editor of College Folio as part of an unruly crowd.

On March 12, 1918, there was a protest by Freshmen, who petitioned to Board of Regents to extend their scholarship. On July 17, 1918, students led by Carlos P. Romulo and Jose Romero held a rally from UP to Santa Cruz Bridge at The Manila Times office to protest the editorial of the newspaper criticizing UP President Ignacio Villamor.

On January 21, 1921, the Executive Committee (EC) of the University approved a memorandum embodying the idea of creating an inter-collegiate student council. In 1922 the EC approved the adoption by the student body of a so-called "bill of rights of the USC". It would take two more years before the constitutional convention for the creation of a USC would take place. The Bill of Rights resolved:

1. To develop university spirit among the ranks of students and promote their general welfare.
2. To advise the President of UP on student matters, affairs, activities of distinctly inter-collegiate concern.
3. To organize and direct student activities of inter-collegiate nature.
4. To adopt its own Constitution and promulgate rules and by-laws for its own internal and general government.
5. To have such powers and perform such other duties as the university authorities may from time to time grant or delegate to the USC.

On September 27, 1924, UP President Rafael Palma revived the University Student Council (USC). The student fund was ₱1.50 (equivalent to ₱409.35 in 2021). The first projects of the USC were the establishment of the post office building and awarding of scholarships and medals to outstanding students. On January 31, 1926, USC initiated the first meeting of students from different colleges and schools ever held in Manila at the Zorilla theater. The USC then was composed of 96 members, with each class of every college entitled to two representatives. The USC also published The Philippinensian. In 1927 the USC passed a resolution radically reducing the number of USC members to 24. In 1929 the USC protested the increase of fees and the rigid rules of the Department of Physical Education.

On January 18, 1933, there was a student demonstration in support of the Hare-Hawes Cutting Act. Senate President Manuel L. Quezon disapproved of the rally, saying that students should be studying for their examinations and should not participate in political affairs. Students also held another rally the same year protesting a bill that would reorganize government personnel except legislators. Lawmakers who visited the university were booed and heckled.

In June 1935, both USC candidates for the position of President received an equal number of votes, even after two hours of repeated deliberations. The candidates agreed to divide the term upon the behest of the council adviser, breaking the deadlock.

In 1937, UP students and faculty campaigned for the right of Filipino women to vote. On February 5, 1939, the USC petitioned the BOR that it be given the power to elect the Editor-in-Chief of the Philippine Collegian. The USC reasoned that since it was the highest governing student body, it must be given control over the official student organ.

In 1940, the USC office was moved to the second floor of the newly built Alumni Hall with the Philippine Collegian, The Philippinensian and the Institute of National Language. The USC also started to elect a Vice-Chairperson not from UP Los Banos Representatives. Instead they elected a student from Veterinary Science to be the Vice-Chair.

In 1946, USC was revived after World War II together with other student organizations, notably the Junior and Senior Student Councils. USC passed a resolution affirming faith in UP President Bienvenido Ma. Gonzalez amidst rumors the university was not satisfied with his administration.

In April 1948, USC President Villanueva observed that a major problem in the university was the deficiency of the students in their command of English.

In 1950, Huks attacked the PC Detachment in Balara, sending dorm residents to take cover in basements and in the Law building.

=== 1951-1968 ===
During this period the UP Student Council counted several people as members who would later become prominent public figures, including Marcelo Fernan, Homobono Adaza, Randy David, Delfin Lazaro, Miriam Defensor.

On March 29, 1951, the USC, Senior Student Council, Junior Student Council and the Woman's Club led the first UP Diliman student rally to Malacañan Palace to express support for UP President Gonzales, who invited Claro M. Recto, arch-critic of President Quirino, to deliver the commencement address at the UP graduation. Vidal Tan eventually replaced Gonzales, but the students won the right to hear Recto at their graduation and have Gonzales sign their diplomas instead of President Tan. On November 30, 1952, USC Chair Rafael Salas led the students to a rally at Malacañan Palace protesting the policies of President Elpidio Quirino.

On August 4, 1955, USC Chair Fernando Campos held an emergency meeting expressing support for three members of the Board of Regents (BOR) and planned a rally demanding the ouster of Fr. John Patrick Delaney from UP for interfering in university affairs. In November 1955 the UP Student Catholic Action (UPSCA) and the Upsilon Sigma Phi fraternity war flared anew when four UPSCA USC members filed charges against Campos, an Upsilonian. The charges were illegal alteration of USC Resolution of August 4, grave abuse of power, and shameful conduct unbecoming his office. Campos countercharged that the complainants were conducting a systematic campaign of vilification against him. Both charges were dropped by the University Committee on Student Organizations and Associations. On June 22, 1956, UPSCA took full control of USC, defeating Upsilon from top post to minor posts.

On December 16–17, 1957, a "peaceful and spontaneous" student strike led by USC took place in response to inaction from the BOR to elect a new UP President. The University Council (UC) was forced to declare an early Christmas vacation. On the third day of strike, students held a victory motorcade around Quezon City and Manila passing Malacañan Palace. On January 2, 1958, the Executive Committee (EC) of UP entered dialogue with student leaders to discontinue future strikes. On January 20, 1958, students Johnny Antillon, Emmanuel Santos, Epifanio San Juan, Jr., and Romulo Villa petitioned to expel USC Chair and Vice Chair Lagua and Adaza, first for the illegal and immoral use of the Philippine Collegian to malign the BOR and the UP administration, and second for inciting 1,000 university students to join the student strike. On March 30, 1958, the EC sustained recommendations that Lagua be suspended for nine months and removed as USC Chair. Adaza permanently dropped out from the rolls of the university. The two were required to apologize in writing to the BOR. Senator Emmanuel Pelaez spoke on behalf of the two and declared that they had suffered from a serious miscarriage of justice.

On June 24, 1958, UP President Vicente Sinco issued Administrative Circular no. 1, which limited the representation of any student organization to one representative only in each of the student councils, to counter the dominance of the UPSCA. UPSCA said the circular was "illegal, discriminatory, unreasonable, undemocratic and arbitrary", and filed a case in court. The Supreme Court dismissed the petition on technical grounds, saying that UPSCA should have exhausted administrative remedies within the university. The decision came only in 1960. In effect, there was no USC from 1958-1960. In January 1961, the BOR approved Article 448, the Circular no. 1 of Pres. Sinco. It also approved Article 437, which provided for a Student Union which would take charge of cultural and social programs and activities of the student body.

On March 14, 1961, there was an investigation by the Committee Against Anti-Filipino Activities (CAFA) on 10 UP professors for their alleged involvement in communist activities. 1,000 UP students held a demonstration in Congress to denounce the investigation.

On January 6, 1962, the Student Union protested President Macapagal's offer to Carlos P. Romulo to become UP President, saying that "UP is not an auction bloc at Macapagal's personal disposal". On January 12, 1962, Union Chair Enrique Voltaire Garcia led the UP students to a rally in front of Quezon Hall affirming support and trust in BOR, the sole body tasked to choose the UP President. On January 18, 1962, the Student Union met for two hours to pass a resolution calling Macapagal to withdraw the offer to Romulo "in order that the independence and prestige of the state university may be restored". 38 Union members voted "yes" to the resolution, with three voting against. Romulo became President anyway in June of that year, and restored the USC, which presented former UP President Sinco with a plaque during his resignation for his "commitment to the preservation of the free and secular nature of the university".

In July 1963, President Romulo proclaimed the Academic Year 1963–1964 as the Year of the Student. In 1964-65, the USC initiated the jeepney campus boycott, until fares for campus rides were reduced to five centavos from 10 centavos. In December 1964, the Student Cultural Association in UP (SCAUP) made a float for the Lantern Parade with Jun Tera in the stance and uniform of a Vietnamese guerilla. Instead of Christmas Carols, the students sang The Internationale.

On September 11, 1966, USC Chair Voltaire Garcia led a large demonstration at the Palace to protest against the deployment of Filipino forces for a foreign war. On October 24, 1966, the USC led a march of students from Quezon City to the Manila Hotel, where the Manila Summit was held. 5,000 students protested the continuing American intervention in the Vietnam War. Police violently dispersed the protesters, with many injured. The USC called for an inter-university rally of indignation, and the October 24 Movement was formed. The USC called for a National Students' Congress for the advancement of nationalism to be held in Diliman, which was attended by 500 student leaders. In July 1968, the USC, Philippine Collegian, Katipunang Makabansa, Pagkakaisa, and the Partisans led 14 busloads of students to the Congress building to oppose the Second Philippine Civil Action Group bill on the involvement of the country in the Vietnam War. On August 16, 1968, Metrocom dispersed a rally led by UP students at the US Embassy and Malacañang to protest the "Special Relations" between the Philippines and USA. Five UP students suffered bruises. In September 1968, Senator Lorenzo Tañada, head of the Movement for the Advancement of Nationalism (MAN) protested the Americanization of UP. USC started leading demonstrations against the Vietnam War, Philippine participation in the war, oil monopolies, implementation of the retail trade nationalization laws, and US imperialism.

== University Student Council (USC) Chairpersons ==
Term	Name	Party	Remarks
1913	Manuel Mariano Tabora		Student Council was established under the auspices of UP President Barlett. Tabora of the College of Law was the first president. On October 6, 1913, the USC participated in the popular demonstration in honor of Governor-General Harrison.
1915	Andrés Ranola		
1925-26	Eduardo R. Alvarado		
1926-27	Juan Chuidian		
1927-28	Ramon Nolasco		
1928-29	Lorenzo Sumulong		
1929-30	Gregorio Lantin		
1930-31	Enrique J. Corpus		
1931-32	Manuel Sevilla		
1932-33	Wenceslao Vinzons		Vinzons also served as editor-in-chief of the Philippine Collegian.
1933-34	Ramon Enriquez, Alberto Leynes		
1934-35	Avelino Pascual		
1935-36	Potenciano Illusorio, Jose Laurel Jr.		
1936-37	Ciceron B. Angeles, Sr.		
1937-38	Roberto S. Benedicto		
1938-39	Sotero Laurel		
1939-40	Florante Roque		
1940-41	Hermogenes Concepción, Jr.		
1941-42	Antonio Azores		
1943	Quintin Gomez		
1944	Troadio T. Quiazon, Jr.		
1944-46			Interrupted by World War II
1946-47	Troadio T. Quiazon, Jr.		
1947-48	Delfín Villanueva		
1948-49	Emilio Espinosa, Jr.		
1949-50	Antonio M. Meer		
1950-51	Teodoro Padilla		
1951-52	Marcelo Fernan		
1952-53	Rafael Salas		
1953-54	Jose C. Palarca Jr.		
1954-55	Eliás B. Lopez		
1955-56	Fernando C. Campos		
1956-57	Fernando A. Lagua		
1957-58	Fernando A. Lagua		
1961-62	Enrique Voltaire García II		The 'Student Council' is renamed 'UP Student Union'
1962-63	Eric O. de Guia		
1963-64	Leonardo Quisumbing		The 'UP Student Union' is renamed 'UP Student Council'
1964-65	Benjamin Muego		
1965-66	Tristan Catindíg		Served as editor-in-chief of the Philippine Collegian
1966-67	Enrique Voltaire García II		
1967-68	Delfín Lazaro		
1968-69	Antonio Pastelero		
1969-70	Fernando Barican	Partisans for Nationalist Student Power	At its 787th meeting, the UP Board of Regents resolved to have a "student observer", on the recommendation of UP President Salvador Lopez. Barican was then allowed to observe the board proceedings.
1970-71	Ericson Baculinao	Sandigang Makabansa (SM)	Was the UP Student Council Chairperson during the Diliman Commune.
1971-72	Manuel Ortega	Katipunan ng Malayang Pagkakaisa (KMP)	A UP College of Law student and a member of President Ferdinand Marcos’s fraternity, Upsilon Sigma Phi.
1972	Jaime Galvez Tan	Sandigan Makabansa (SM)	A junior medical student previously serving as University Councilor in 1971, he is the first chairperson from the College of Medicine. Served for little over a month, from September 8 to October 13 due to Martial Law
1972-80			USC abolished during Martial Law
1980-81	Malou Mangahas	SAMASA	First Woman Chairperson. She also served as editor-in-chief of the Philippine Collegian. She co-founded the Philippine Center for Investigative Journalism.
1981-82	Jose "Pepe" Alcántara	SAMASA	Part of the founding group of the Sandigan para sa Mag-aaral at Sambayanan (SAMASA) alongside Leandro Alejandro.
1982-83	Jessie John Gimenez	SAMASA	Served as vice chairperson during the term of Malou Mangahas as chairperson.
1983-84	Leandro Alejandro	SAMASA	As UP Diliman Student Council chairperson, he was selected by KASAMA sa UP, the national alliance of student councils in the UP System, to be concurrent Student Regent. However, his appointment was rejected by the late dictator Marcos.
1984-85	Loudette Almazan	SAMASA	Was chairperson during the 1984 Diliman Barricades, the first barricade in Diliman after Martial Law and a successor to the 1971 Diliman Commune. 5000 students protest against the rising cost of education by padlocking many academic buildings and blocked the roads leading to UP Diliman. Conducted concurrently with the September 1984 Welcome Rotonda protest dispersal.
1985-86	Chito Gascon	TUGON	First chairperson from Nagkaisang Tugon (TUGON). He served as student/youth representative during the 1986 Constitutional Commission. He also served as Chairperson of the Commission on Human Rights (CHR).
1986-87	Francis Pangilinan	SAMASA	First chairperson to be appointed as Student Regent to the University's Board of Regents with voting powers. He served three terms as senator. He also served as Presidential Assistant on Food Security and Agricultural Modernization (PAFSAM) under the second Aquino administration. In 2022, he ran for the vice presidency of the Republic of the Philippines.
1987-88	David Celdran	ASA	SAMASA decides against participating in USC elections
1988-89	Gonzalo Bongolan	SAMASA	
1989-90	Amante Jimenez	SAMASA	
1990-91	Rex Varona	SAMASA	
1991-92	Angelo Jimenez	ISA	First student regent to be voted UP President to the Board of Regents
1992-93	Rhoneil Fajardo	ISA	
1993-94	Teddy Rigoroso	SAMASA	
1994-95	Paul Roderick Ysmael	ISA	
1995-96	Oliver San Antonio	ISA	SAMASA-TMMA splits from SAMASA
1996-97	Ibarra Gutierrez III	SAMASA	Served as editor-in-chief of the Philippine Collegian. SAMASA-TMMA becomes STAND UP, fields first slate.
1997-98	Percival Cendaña	SAMASA	First openly gay chairperson. Cendaña served as a Commissioner-at-Large at the Philippine National Youth Commission (NYC) from 2011 to 2016. Also served as former Akbayan Partylist Deputy Secretary-General and Chairperson. Became the first nominee of Akbayan Partylist for the 2022 elections.
1998-99	Giancarlo Sambalido	ISA	
1999-2000	María Cielo Magno	SAMASA	Appointed under the Marcos Jr. Administration as Fiscal Policy and Monitoring Group Undersecretary at the Department of Finance as temporary loan or “on secondment”. "Forced to resign" due to "clear lack of support for the administration and its programs for nation-building" after her post of a graph on her Facebook account illustrating the basic economic concept of supply and demand went viral. Currently an associate professor at the UP School of Economics. Prior to her appointment to the Department of Finance, she was elected to represent civil society in the Board of the Extractive Industries Transparency Initiative. While in the Board she championed the disclosure of social (including Free Prior and Informed Consent of indigenous peoples affected by extraction of natural resources) and environmental provisions in the global standards of EITI.
2000-01	Raymond Palatino	STAND UP	First chairperson from Student Alliance for the Advancement of Democratic Rights in UP (STAND UP). He was a member of the Philippine House of Representatives, representing the Kabataan party list.
2001-02	Nova Navo	STAND UP	ALYANSA & SAPi field their first slates, SAMASA no longer fields candidates
2002-03	Rommel Romato	STAND UP	First Muslim Chairperson. He also served as Chairperson of Katipunan ng mga Sangguniang Mag-aaral sa UP (KASAMA sa UP), and President of the UP Muslim Students' Association. SAPi changes name to Convergence, ALYANSA and SAMASA field candidates under AKMA.
2003-04	JPaul S. Manzanilla	STAND UP	First student regent to be USC Chairperson after tenure at Board of Regents
2004-05	Kristian Ablan	ALYANSA	First chairperson from Alyansa ng mga Mag-aaral para sa Panlipunang Katwiran at Kaunlaran (ALYANSA), Convergence joins ALYANSA to form a two-party fight against Atom Araullo of STAND UP.
2005-06	Marco de los Reyes	STAND UP	Year when faction of ALYANSA splits to form KAISA - Nagkakaisang Iskolar para sa Pamantasan at Sambayanan (KAISA-UP), fields candidates the year after.
2006-07	Paolo Alfonso	STAND UP	Opposed the 300% tuition increase that was proposed and approved by the UP Board of Regents. Called on AFP General Hermogenes Esperon to surface UP students Karen Empeño and Sherlyn Cadapan, both abducted by the military (Cadapan was a former USC member).
2007-08	Shahana Abdulwahid	STAND UP	First female Muslim USC Chairperson and was selected as Student Regent the year after. Called for the rollback of the 300% tuition increase.
2008-09	Herminio Bagro III	ALYANSA	System-wide referendum for the approval of the Codified Rules for Student Regent Selection (CRSRS) as required by the UP Charter RA 9500. Of 12,097 UP Diliman students who participated in the referendum, 66% voted to approve. A total of 26,118 students participated System-wide. Bagro came in eighth place in the Bar Examinations, a year after his term as chairperson. Served as Undersecretary for Operations of the Presidential Management Staff under the Aquino III Administration. Worked as Chief-of-Staff of Sen. Francis "Kiko" Pangilinan starting in 2016. Appointed as Legal and Legislative Affairs Undersecretary to DTI Secretary Alfredo E. Pascual in 2022. Currently serving as the Philippines' Country Representative to the US-ASEAN Business Council since June 2023.
2009-10	Titus Tan	KAISA-UP	First USC Chairperson from KAISA - Nagkakaisang Iskolar para sa Pamantasan at Sambayanan (KAISA-UP); The consultation phase of the Diliman Administration's draft 2009 Code of Student Conduct (CSC) was opposed by the USC for the lack of student representation in the drafting committee. The 20 student demands were formulated.
2010-11	Rainier Astin Sindayen	STAND UP	The post-consultation committee draft 2010 CSC only reflected partial sentiments from the students.
2011-12	Jemimah Grace García	STAND UP	Pushed for the review of the draft 2010 CSC, which was granted by Diliman Chancellor Caesar Saloma, forming the Student Review Committee (SRC).
2012-13	Gabriel "Heart" Diño	ALYANSA	First transgender USC Chairperson. She served as a member of the Philippine National Anti-Poverty Commission, representing the Youth and Students Sector.
2013-14	Ana Alexandra "Alex" Castro	KAISA-UP	First openly bisexual USC Chairperson and the second USC chairperson from KAISA-UP.
2014-15	Arjay Mercado	ALYANSA	Second openly gay USC Chairperson. USC begins the drafting process for the UP Diliman Students' Magna Carta.
2015-16	John Paulo "JP" delas Nieves	ALYANSA / Independent	He was elected with a voter's turnout of 51.21%, the highest turnout in recent history. He is also the only student leader who received more than 5000 votes twice, first as Vice Chairperson (5175) and then as Chairperson (5130) During his term, UP Diliman Student's Magna Carta obtained 94% approval in a referendum. Delas Nieves filed a disqualification case against then-Mayor Rodrigo Duterte during his bid for presidency, arguing that Duterte was mocking the election system because of alleged violations of election rules when he substituted for Martin Diño as PDP-LABAN's candidate.
2016-17	Bryle Leaño	STAND UP	Elected with 5,849 votes, the highest ever number of votes for a USC Chairperson candidate. Leaño was the first engineering student to become a USC Chairperson in the new millennium, and the first drag performer to stand for the chair.
2017-18	Benjie Allen Aquino	ALYANSA	First USC Chairperson from the College of Business Administration and the Centennial BAC Chairperson
2018	Jose Rafael Toribio	KAISA-UP	Got elected in a three-party race with a majority vote of 57 percent
2018-19	Kisha Beringuela	ALYANSA	Elected vice chairperson. Acted chairperson in the middle of her term due to the preventive suspension of the chairperson. Officially became chairperson following the resignation.
2019-20	Sean Angelo Thakur	KAISA-UP	First elected back-to-back Chairpersons from KAISA-UP
2020	Kenneth Eser Jose	STAND UP	Elected vice chairperson. Acted chairperson then took over as Chairperson following Thakur's inability to continue with the holdover term.
2020	Froilan Adrielle Cariaga	STAND UP	Elected by the USC 22nd General Assembly as Chairperson following the resignation of Eser Jose.
2021-22	Jonas Angelo Abadilla	STAND UP	First USC Chairperson remotely elected
2022-2023	Latrell Andrei Felix	STAND UP	Second USC Chairperson remotely elected. Is also the second transgender woman to hold the position of Chairperson, after Heart Diño.
October 2023 - August 2024	Mary Sunshine Reyes	Independent	Convened the UP Not For Sale Network in the midst of commercialization within the university through DiliMall.
October 2024 - May 2025	Sean Kirby Latorre	Independent	Previously served as Vice Chairperson for AY 2023-2024 after being elected in the October 2023 USC Special Elections. Was elected in another special election in October 2024 after abstain votes swept over all standard bearer and councilor positions in the May 2024 USC Elections.
May 2025 - Present	Joaquin "Waks" Buenaflor	Independent	Hailed from SALiGAN sa CSSP, a local political party in UP Diliman College of Social Science and Philosophy. Previously served as a USC councilor from 2024 until his election as the USC chairperson in 2025. Ran under the Laban Kabataan Coalition, a temporary coalition of some independent candidates that ran for the 2025 regular student council elections, mass organizations, and college political parties. Buenaflor garnered 6082 votes, the highest number of votes that a chairperson candidate received since 2000, at a time when the student population in UP Diliman was at its third highest since 2000 (25,722 students). The 2025 regular student council elections also marked the first time that the voter turnout in the council elections reached 40% since the 46.18% voter turnout in 2021.

== University Student Council (USC) Councilors ==
=== Proclaimed as of May 21, 2026 ===
1. Eimeevelle Basco (Independent; Sulong Tayo Coalition)
2. Gianna Geronimo (Independent; Sulong Tayo Coalition)
3. Gio Biglaen (Independent; Sulong Tayo Coalition)
4. Angel Lopez (Independent; Sulong Tayo Coalition)
5. Elaina Salvador (Independent; Sulong Tayo Coalition)
6. Gaia Mauricio (Independent; Sulong Tayo Coalition)
7. Rommer Publico (Independent; Sulong Tayo Coalition)
8. Lorenz Sy (Independent; Sulong Tayo Coalition)
9. Thirdy Tolentino (Independent; Sulong Tayo Coalition)
10. Wilbert Pillos (Independent; Sulong Tayo Coalition)
11. Jill Abian (UP ALYANSA)
12. No Proclaimed Councilor (ABSTAIN)

== See also ==
- University of the Philippines
- University of the Philippines Diliman
