= Embassy of the Philippines, Amman =

Diplomatic mission of the Philippines in Jordan

Embassy of the Philippines, Amman Pasuguan ng Pilipinas sa Amman سفارة الفلبين في عمان
- Location: Amman
- Address: 20 Salah Touqan Street, Sweifieh
- Coordinates: 31°57′4.9″N 35°52′5.1″E
- Ambassador: Wilfredo C. Santos
- Website: ammanpe.dfa.gov.ph

The Embassy of the Philippines in Amman is the diplomatic mission of the Republic of the Philippines to the Hashemite Kingdom of Jordan. It is located in the neighborhood of Sweifieh in the Wadi Al-Seer district of western Amman. Although the current embassy dates from 1998, the Philippines also maintained a previous resident embassy in Jordan between 1980 and 1993.

== History ==
Diplomatic relations between the Philippines and Jordan were established on March 1, 1976, although a resident mission in Jordan would not be immediately established by the Philippine government. An honorary consulate was first established in 1979, led by Costandi M. Muna.

A resident mission in Jordan was finally opened in 1980, when Rafael E. Seguis, who would later become Undersecretary of Foreign Affairs, was designated as the mission's chargé d'affaires. The following year, he was replaced by Cesar C. Pastores, who in 1983 would become the Philippines' first resident ambassador to Jordan. This first mission, however, was closed in 1993 due to financial constraints, and was subsequently replaced by another honorary consulate, led by retired major general Shafiq Jumean, which was placed under the jurisdiction of the Philippine Embassy in Baghdad.

The embassy was reopened in 1998 due to the increasing numbers of Overseas Filipino Workers (OFWs) working in Jordan, as well as in recognition of Jordan's critical role in the various peace processes in the Middle East.

In June 2013, an embassy staff member was accused by Representative Walden Bello of being complicit in a sexual exploitation ring involving female OFWs in their care, which also implicated other missions in the Middle East. Later identified to be the welfare officer for the mission's Philippine Overseas Labor Office, he denied any involvement in the scheme. Foreign Affairs Secretary Albert del Rosario nonetheless opened an investigation into the matter, and even temporarily recalled Ambassador Olivia V. Palala so she can assist him in the probe. A separate probe was also opened by the Department of Labor and Employment (DOLE) on the matter, and several members of the Senate sought to investigate the scandal as well. The welfare officer was subsequently suspended by the DOLE without pay for four months on unrelated charges of using indecent language with distressed OFWs and viewing pornographic materials on a government-issued laptop, and although he appealed the DOLE's decision, it was later upheld with a further suspension on future overseas deployments.

== Chancery ==
The chancery of the Philippine Embassy in Amman relocated to Sweifieh on June 1, 2022, moving from its previous location in the neighboring neighborhood of Abdoun. The new chancery was inaugurarated on Independence Day, June 12, 2022, by Ambassador Akmad A. Sakkam and Embassy personnel, with members of the Filipino community in Jordan also in attendance.

== Staff and activities ==
The Philippine Embassy in Amman is currently headed by Ambassador Wilfredo C. Santos, who was appointed to the position by President Bongbong Marcos on September 1, 2022. Prior to becoming Ambassador, Santos, a career diplomat, headed the Philippine Embassy in Tehran as ambassador to Iran, and before that headed the Philippine Embassy in Doha as ambassador to Qatar. His appointment was confirmed by the Commission on Appointments on September 28, 2022, and he presented his credentials to King Abdullah II on March 8, 2023.

Many of the embassy's activities center around the protection and welfare of OFWs deployed to Jordan, including controlling the flow of Filipino labor into the country, and ensuring that Filipinos already working in Jordan are able to regularize their status. Its record though is mixed; in 2013, around 30 stranded OFWs protested at the embassy, demanding their immediate repatriation to the Philippines. Beyond that function, the embassy has also been involved in a number of cultural initiatives to promote ties between the Philippines and Jordan, such as arranging showings of Filipino films in the country, and organizing a Filipino food bazaar.

The embassy is also responsible for the Philippines' relationship with the State of Palestine, and as such it exercises jurisdiction over Filipinos residing in the Gaza Strip and the West Bank. Since the outbreak of the Gaza war in October 2023 it has overseen efforts to evacuate Filipinos from both territories, but it has also engaged in consular outreach missions, as well as virtual consultations with the Filipino community in Palestine.

== See also ==
- List of diplomatic missions of the Philippines
- List of diplomatic missions in Jordan
