= Embassy of Palestine, Manila =

Diplomatic mission of the State of Palestine to the Philippines

- Location: Makati City, National Capital Region
- Address: Unit 22D, Chatham House Condominium, Valero cor. Rufino St., Salcedo Village
- Coordinates: 14.5594861°N 121.0193971°E
- Ambassador: H.E. Mounir Y.K. Anastas

The Embassy of the State of Palestine in Philippines (Arabic: سفارة دولة فلسطين لدى الفلبين) is the diplomatic mission of Palestine in Philippines, located in Makati City, Metro Manila.

The Philippines recognized Palestinian statehood and established diplomatic relations on 4 September 1989, during the presidency of Corazon Aquino, with the embassy opening in Manila in May of the following year. A resident ambassador was not posted to the mission until 2020, when President Rodrigo Duterte's government described the embassy's reopening as the start of a new period in relations between the two countries. Since February 2025, the mission has been led by Ambassador Mounir Y.K. Anastas, formerly the Palestinian representative to UNESCO.

== History ==
=== Background ===
The Philippines was the only Asian state among the 33 countries that voted for UN Resolution 181, the November 1947 plan to partition the British Mandate of Palestine. The Philippine delegate, Carlos P. Romulo, initially signaled to the General Assembly that his country would not support dividing Palestine, but President Manuel Roxas instructed the delegation to reverse its position shortly before the vote was taken, reportedly out of concern about the reaction of the United States Senate.

The Philippines later voted in favor of United Nations General Assembly Resolution 67/19, joining the majority of the UN member-states in recognizing Palestine as a non-member state. Following the vote, the Department of Foreign Affairs spokesperson Raul Hernandez stated that the Philippine government backs Palestinian self-determination and hopes an independent Palestine will eventually coexist peacefully with neighboring countries.

=== Recognition and upgrade to embassy ===
The Philippines recognized the State of Palestine and established diplomatic relations on September 4, 1989, during the administration of President Corazon Aquino. The Embassy of the State of Palestine opened in Manila in May 1990. The embassy was later closed in 1994 due to financial reasons.

In June 2020, President Rodrigo Duterte received the credentials of Saleh As'ad Saleh Fhied Mohammad. The Malacañan Palace described him as the first Palestinian ambassador to the Philippines and called the embassy's reopening the previous year the start of a new chapter in relations between the two countries. Mohammad completed his posting in September 2024, paying a farewell call to President Bongbong Marcos.

Ambassador Anastas presented his letter of credence to President Marcos on February 26, 2025, becoming ambassador extraordinary and plenipotentiary to the Philippines. He had previously served as the Permanent Representative of the State of Palestine to the United Nations Educational, Scientific and Cultural Organization (UNESCO) in Paris. He is accompanied by Zlad A.M. Bedaiwi has the First Secretary. In a brief remarks after the ceremony, Anastas thanked the Philippines for its support of the Palestinian cause and pointed to what he called shared values of resilience, justice, and human dignity between the two peoples, and President Marcos reaffirmed his government's support for Palestinian self-determination. He also described the Philippines as one of the first countries to recognize Palestinian statehood, and characterized Philippine support since then as more consistent than that of some Western governments that back a two-state settlement without extending recognition.

== Premises and diplomatic status ==
The embassy's offices are on the upper floors of Chatham House Condominium, at the corner of Valero and Rufino Streets in Salcedo Village, Makati, according to the Philippine Department of Foreign Affairs' diplomatic and consular list.

The Philippines, on the other hand, does not maintain a resident embassy in Palestine. The Philippine ambassador to Jordan, based in Amman, held concurrent, non-resident jurisdiction over the State of Palestine. In the Department of Foreign Affairs' order of diplomatic precedence, the Palestinian ambassador ranked 20th overall and seventh among ambassadors then resident in the Philippines, as of October 2023.

== List of heads of mission ==
| Name | Assumed office | Left office | President | Notes |
|---|---|---|---|---|
| Saleh As'ad Saleh Fhied Mohammad | June 20, 2020 | September 25, 2024 | Rodrigo Duterte | Described by the Philippine government as the first resident Palestinian ambassador to the Philippines |
| Mounir Y. K. Anastas | February 26, 2025 | Incumbent | Bongbong Marcos | Formerly Permanent Representative of the State of Palestine to UNESCO |

== See also ==
- List of diplomatic missions of Palestine
- Diplomatic missions in the Philippines
- Foreign relations of the State of Palestine
- List of diplomatic missions of Palestine
- List of diplomatic missions in the Philippines
- Embassy of Israel, Manila
- Embassy of the Philippines, Amman
