= Embassy of the Philippines, Riyadh =

Embassy of the Philippines, Riyadh Pasuguan ng Pilipinas sa Riyadh سفارة الفلبين في الرياض

- Location: Riyadh
- Address: 3479 Arradaef Street, As Safara, Riyadh 12512-7474
- Coordinates: 24°40′58″N 46°37′46.5″E
- Chargé d'affaires: Rommel A. Romato
- Website: riyadhpe.dfa.gov.ph

The Embassy of the Philippines in Riyadh is the diplomatic mission of the Republic of the Philippines to the Kingdom of Saudi Arabia. Established on December 23, 1973, in Jeddah, the embassy is now located in the Diplomatic Quarter district in Riyadh.

The embassy also covers Philippine interests in the Republic of Yemen. It maintains an Honorary Consulate in Sana'a, Republic of Yemen.

== History ==
The Philippines established diplomatic relations with the Kingdom of Saudi Arabia in October 1969, following its recognition of the Kingdom on November 15, 1946. The first Philippine mission opened in Jeddah on December 23, 1973.

A 1983 Royal Decree by King Fahd bin Abdulaziz Al-Saud mandated the relocation of all diplomatic missions to Riyadh, the new capital city. The Philippine government acquired land through a formal agreement in 1985. The embassy temporarily operated in the King Fahd Quarter beginning July 1985 while the new chancery was constructed in the Diplomatic Quarter.

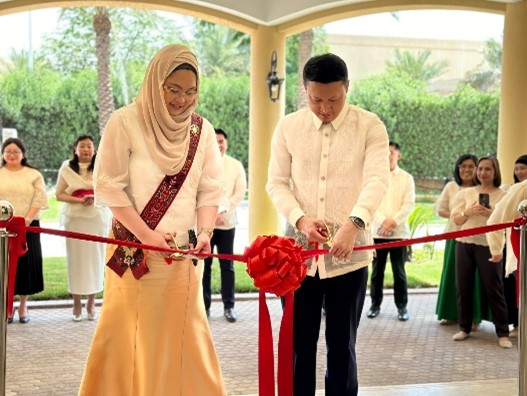
On June 5, 2024, the Philippine Embassy in Riyadh, led by Chargé d'Affaires Rommel Romato, proudly inaugurated the newly restored Ambassador's Residence within the Embassy's compound.

In 1994, President Fidel Ramos laid the cornerstone for the new embassy buildings. The new chancery was inaugurated in 1996 under Ambassador Romulo Espaldon.

== Ambassador's residence ==
The ambassador's residence was constructed concurrently with the embassy's chancery and has required renovations over the years. It serves as the official residence of the Head of Post and hosted numerous distinguished guests. On 5 June 2024, the Philippine Embassy in Riyadh, under the leadership of Chargé d'Affaires Rommel Romato, proudly inaugurated the newly restored Ambassador's Residence. This significant restoration project stands as a testament to the embassy's unwavering commitment to preserving the 28-year-old official residence designed by the esteemed Filipino national artist for Architecture, Francisco Mañosa.

== Construction of Multi-Purpose Hall in Riyadh ==
On 23 June 2021, the Philippine Embassy in Riyadh has communicated to the Department of Foreign Affairs (DFA) that it had entered into a contract with the First Gulf Company to construct the Philippine Embassy Multi-Purpose Hall (MPH) in Diplomatic Quarter, Riyadh.

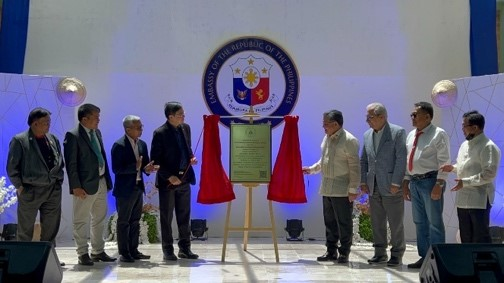
Ambassador Adnan Alonto led the inauguration of the Philippine Embassy’s Multipurpose Building last 10 June 2022.

The signing ceremony was hosted by H.E. Adnan V. Alonto, the Philippine Ambassador to the Kingdom of Saudi Arabia, and was attended by Hon. Robert Borje, the Special Envoy of the President and Presidential Assistant on Foreign Affairs (PAFA), along with Hon. Sarah Lou Arriola, DFA Undersecretary for Migrant Workers’ Affairs, Assistant Secretary Enrico Fos of the DFA Office of the Undersecretary for Migrant Workers’ Affairs (OUMWA), and Assistant Secretary JV Arcena of the Presidential Communications Operations Office (PCOO). These dignitaries were visiting Riyadh on an official mission.

The Multi-purpose Hall is envisioned to provide a venue for the expanding number of services offered to Filipinos living in the Kingdom. The project was funded by the Philippine Government under the 2020 General Appropriations Act (GAA) through the initiative of former Secretary of Foreign Affairs and then Speaker of the House of Representatives Alan Peter S. Cayetano. The construction commenced in July 2021 and completed in February 2022 with the inauguration of the MPH held in June 2022.

== Activities ==
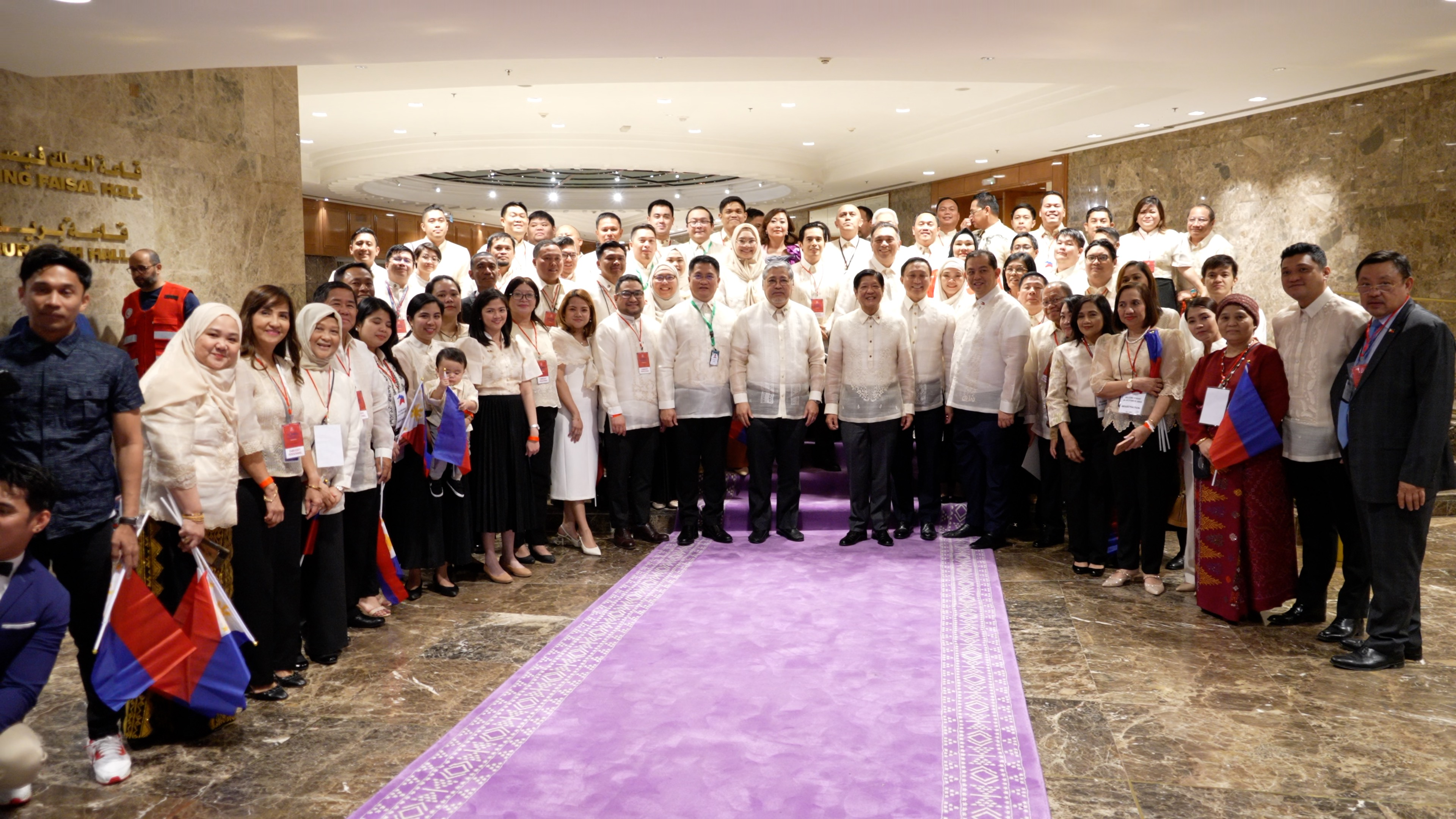
President Ferdinand Bongbong Marcos Jr. meets with Philippine Embassy officials and staff and the Filipino community on the sidelines of the inaugural ASEAN-GCC Summit in Riyadh on October 20, 2023.

The Philippine Embassy in Riyadh serves as a lifeline for Filipinos in Saudi Arabia. It protects the rights of Overseas Filipino Workers (OFWs) through labor assistance programs and promotes their well-being with cultural events and reintegration initiatives. The embassy also facilitates a smooth Hajj experience for Filipino Muslims and assists Filipino scholars pursuing educational opportunities in Saudi Arabia.

Looking beyond needs of overseas Filipinos in the Kingdom, the embassy fosters trade and business partnerships between the Philippines and Saudi Arabia and Yemen. It promotes the Philippines as a tourist destination and connects Filipino professionals with their Saudi and Yemeni counterparts. By offering targeted support for nurses and engineers, the embassy ensures a smooth transition for these in-demand professionals.

The Philippine Embassy serves as a bridge, fostering connections and safeguarding the interests of Filipinos in Saudi Arabia and Yemen.

== Embassy functions and services ==
The embassy offers various Consular Services, including the Issuance and Renewal of Philippine Passports, Issuance of Visas for foreigners, Notarial and Authentication Services for documents, Endorsement of Police and NBI clearances, and Civil Registry services such as Reports of Birth, Marriage, and Death.

== List of heads of mission ==
Ambassador / Head of mission	Tenure	Note(s)
Lininding Pangandaman	1973–1981	
Benjamin Romualdez	1981–1982	
Alejandro Yango	1982–1985	
Mauyag Tamano	1985–1989	
Abraham Rasul	1989–1993	
Romulo Espaldon	1993–1999	
Rafael Seguis	1999–2002	
Bahnarim Guinomla	2002–2006	
Antonio Villamor	2006–2010	
Ezzedin Tago	2010–2016	
Iric Arribas	2016–2017	Chargé d'Affaires, a.i.
Adnan Alonto	2017–2022	
Rommel Romato	2022 – 2025	Chargé d'Affaires, a.i.
Raymond Balatbat	2025 -	

== Honorary consul in Sana’a Yemen ==
Before the unification of the Republic of Yemen in 1990, the Philippines had diplomatic relations with both North and South Yemen. The Philippine Embassy in Riyadh, Saudi Arabia, exercises concurrent jurisdictionover the Republic of Yemen. Mr. Mohammed Saleh Al Jamal is the current Philippine Honorary Consul, a.h., in Sana’a, Yemen.

== Partner agencies ==
=== Migrant Workers Office (MWO) ===
The MWO is the overseas operating arm of the Department of Migrant Workers (DMW). It handles the labor and welfare concerns of Overseas Filipino Workers (OFWs). There are two MWO offices within the consular jurisdiction of the Embassy: one in Riyadh, which covers the central regions of Saudi Arabia, and one in Al Khobar, which serves OFWs in the Eastern Regions. On the other hand, in the western parts of Saudi Arabia, the MWO-Jeddah is based within the Philippine Consulate General's office in Jeddah.

=== Pag-IBIG Fund ===
Since the implementation of Republic Act No. 9679 (RA 9679) in January 2010, also known as the Home Development Mutual Fund Law of 2009 (HDMF Law of 2009), mandatory Fund Coverage has been expanded to include overseas Filipino workers (OFWs). Voluntary membership is also open to all Filipino immigrants, Filipinos naturalized in other countries, and permanent Filipino residents abroad. As a result, Pag-Ibig Fund provides representatives to accept membership applications and offer other Pag-IBIG Fund services to OFWs in the Kingdom.

=== Social Security System (SSS) ===
The SSS Riyadh Representative Office was established in 1998 in line with the mandate of the Social Security System to bring its services closer to its members, wherever they may be, and to implement the coverage program for Overseas Filipino Workers (OFWs). Services include registering new members, verifying existing SSS numbers, and summarizing contributions, along with other relevant SSS concerns.

=== The Office of Police Attaché ===
The Office of the Police Attaché (OPA) in the Kingdom of Saudi Arabia (KSA) was established on 24 February 2009. The office's purpose is to enhance the relationship between the Philippine National Police (PNP) and the law enforcement agencies of KSA, as well as other countries within its jurisdiction, such as the United Arab Emirates. The OPA-KSA represents the Secretary of the Interior and Local Government (SILG), the National Police Commission (NAPOLCOM), and the Chief of the Philippine National Police (PNP) in Saudi Arabia. It also serves as a connection to various international and regional police organizations, particularly concerning transnational crime, terrorism, human trafficking, and migrant worker protection.

The OPA-KSA was established due to the increasing number of Filipinos working in the Middle East and the growing significance of security cooperation between the Philippines and the Gulf States. The OPA's responsibilities include building intelligence networks, sharing security information, and coordinating law enforcement actions that align with the Philippines' national security policies. Its establishment was also driven by the need to provide consular support to Filipino nationals, especially Overseas Filipino Workers (OFWs), who often face legal, security, and other labor-related challenges in their host countries.

Since its establishment, OPA-KSA has played a vital role in intelligence fusion and diplomatic efforts aimed at addressing organized crime, ensuring the safety of Filipino workers, and maintaining strong bilateral relations. It has become a key channel for cooperation between law enforcement and their counterparts in the Middle East, ensuring a mutual exchange of information on security threats, criminal activities, and law enforcement strategies.

=== Philippine Trade and Investment Center (PTIC) ===
In order to further develop economic relations between the Philippines and Saudi Arabia and to pursue trade and economic opportunities, the Philippine Government has recognized the need to establish a Philippine Trade and Investment Center (PTIC) in Riyadh.

This is in line with the Philippine Embassy's mandate in Riyadh to implement the second pillar of Philippine Foreign Policy, which focuses on promoting and achieving economic security. It also aligns with the Department of Trade and Industry's goal to develop globally competitive and innovative industries and services that contribute to inclusive growth and employment generation.

PTIC-Riyadh serves as the primary point of contact for trade and economic activities in Riyadh and Saudi Arabia. This will facilitate more efficient and productive coordination between the Philippine public and private sectors and their Saudi counterparts.

The presence of a Commercial Attaché based in Riyadh helps ensure the Department of Trade and Industry's success in implementing its mandates, as outlined in the Philippine Development Plan 2023-2028, which includes increasing foreign direct investments, enhancing the competitiveness of Philippine industries and services, and improving access to production networks and markets.

Furthermore, the Riyadh-based Commercial Attaché will facilitate and expedite the negotiations and signing of proposed/pending economic agreements between the Philippines and the Kingdom of Saudi Arabia, as they can provide direct contact with relevant government agencies and private institutions involved in the agreements.

== See also ==
- Saudi Arabia–Philippines relations
- Filipinos in Saudi Arabia
- List of diplomatic missions of the Philippines
- List of diplomatic missions in Saudi Arabia
