= List of ambassadors of the Philippines to Saudi Arabia =

Ambassador of the Republic of the Philippines to the Kingdom of Saudi Arabia
- Sugo ng Republika ng Pilipinas sa Kaharian ng Saudi Arabia سفير جمهورية الفلبين لدى المملكة العربية السعودية
- Coat of arms of the Republic of the Philippines
- Incumbent; Raymond R. Balatbat since February 7, 2025
- Department of Foreign Affairs; Embassy of the Philippines, Riyadh
- Style: His/Her Excellency
- Reports to: Department of Foreign Affairs
- Seat: Riyadh, Saudi Arabia
- Nominator: Secretary for Foreign Affairs
- Appointer: President of the Philippines; with the consent of the Commission on Appointments
- Term length: No fixed term
- Inaugural holder: Lininding Pangandaman
- Formation: December 23, 1973
- Website: Philippine Embassy, Riyadh

The ambassador of the Republic of the Philippines to the Kingdom of Saudi Arabia (Filipino: Sugo ng Republika ng Pilipinas sa Kaharian ng Saudi Arabia; Arabic: سفير جمهورية الفلبين لدى المملكة العربية السعودية : safir jumhuriat alfilibiyn ladaa almamlakat alearabiat alsaeudia) is the Philippines' foremost diplomatic representative to the Kingdom of Saudi Arabia. As Head of Mission, the Philippine ambassador is the official representative of the President of the Philippines and the government of the Philippines to the Custodian of the Two Holy Mosques and the government of the Kingdom of Saudi Arabia.

The first Philippine ambassador to Saudi Arabia, H.E. Lininding Pangandaman, served in the former Saudi capital, Jeddah, following the establishment of the Philippine Embassy in the Kingdom in 1973. The embassy is now located in the Diplomatic Quarter district in Riyadh.

== List of Heads of Mission ==
Ambassador / Head of Mission	Tenure	Note(s)	References
Lininding Pangandaman	1973–1981		
Benjamin Romualdez	1981–1982		
Alejandro Yango	1982–1985		
Mauyag Tamano	1985–1989		
Abraham Rasul	1989–1993		
Romulo Espaldon	1993–1999		
Rafael Seguis	1999–2002		
Bahnarim Guinomla	2002–2006		
Antonio Villamor	2006–2010		
Ezzedin Tago	2010–2016		
Iric Arribas	2016–2017	Chargé d'Affaires, a.i.	
Adnan Alonto	2017–2022	Recalled following the circulation of the video showing his wife openly campaigning for a presidential candidate.	
Rommel Romato	2022–2025	Chargé d'Affaires, a.i.	
Raymond Balatbat	2025–		
