= Philippines–Saudi Arabia relations =

- Philippines: Saudi Arabia

Diplomatic mission
- Embassy of the Philippines, Riyadh: Embassy of the Kingdom of Saudi Arabia, Makati

Envoy
- Ambassador Raymond R. Balatbat: Ambassador Abdullah bin Nasser Al-Bussairy

Formal diplomatic relations between the Philippines and Saudi Arabia were established on October 24, 1969.

The Philippines has an embassy in Riyadh and a consulate-general in Jeddah. Saudi Arabia has an embassy in Makati.

Muslim pilgrims from the Philippines visit the cities of Mecca and Medina as part of the Hajj. In 2019, the Philippines was given a quota of 8,000 pilgrims. The Bureau of Pilgrimage and Endowment of the National Commission of Muslim Affairs is responsible for administering and processing the travel requirements of Philippine pilgrims.

== Economic relations ==
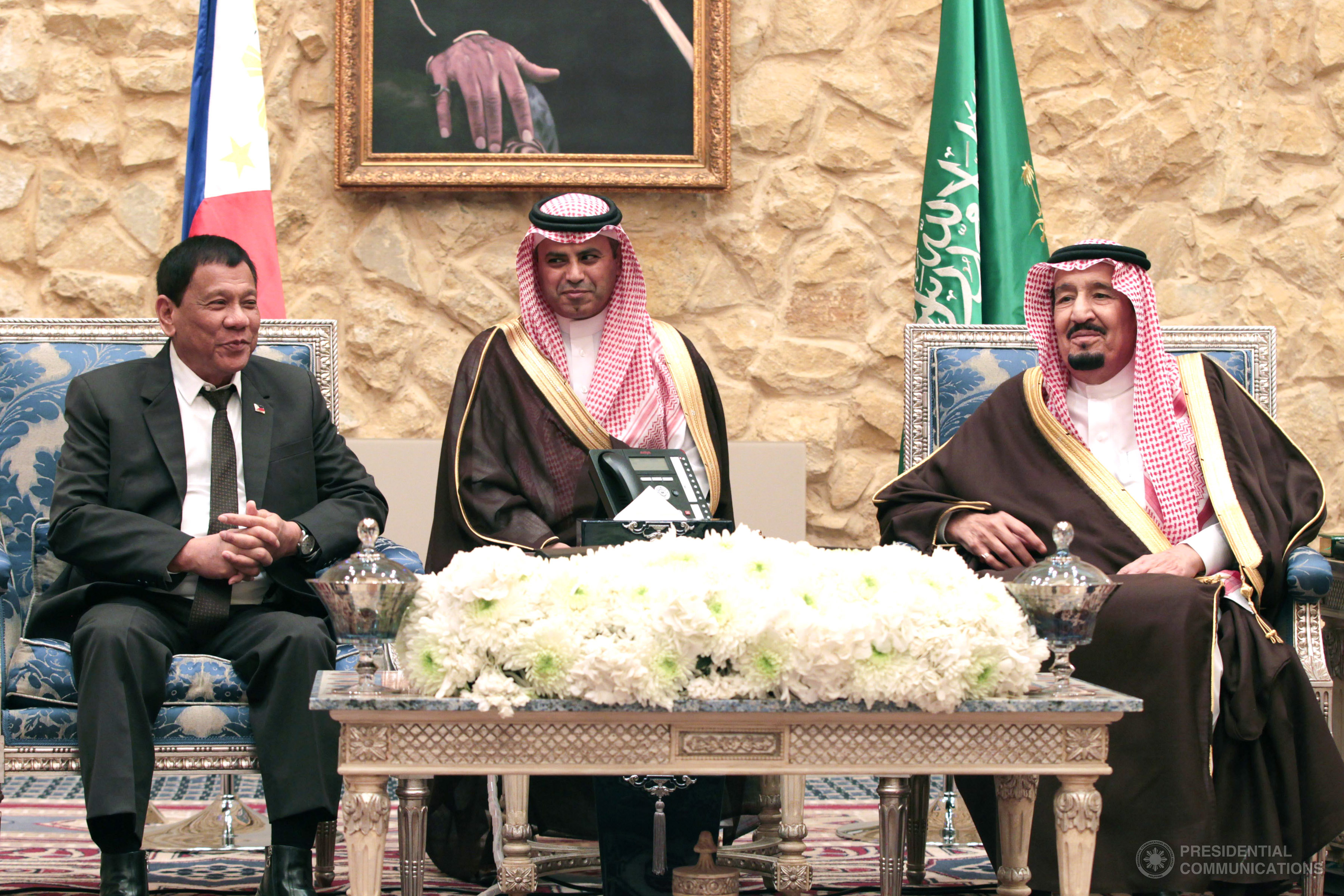
President Rodrigo Duterte (left) meets with King Salman (right) during the former's state visit to the country in 2017.

Before Spain colonized the Philippines, there were the existence of several Precolonial Sultanates in the Philippines such as Sulu, Maguindanao, Lanao, and the capital called Manila (Former colony of the Brunei Sultanate); which had Sultans that could trace their descent to the prophet Mohammad, through Hashemites, Arabs who migrated to the Philippines.

In 2012, Saudi Arabia was the 10th largest trading partner of the Philippines, 31st and 8th largest market in the export and import market respectively. Saudi Arabia was also the Philippines' largest trading partner and import supplier, and second largest export market in the Middle East. According to the Saudi government, trade between Saudi Arabia and the Philippines amounted to $3.6 billion in 2011, a bigger figure compared to the previous year's trade figure amounting to $2.7 billion.

In 2024, the Philippine Government sent its first business mission to Saudi Arabia since the pandemic and Philippine business executives met chambers of commerce in Riyadh, Jeddah, and Dammam. During the trade mission, the Philippine Embassy's Chargé d'affaires Rommel Romato announced the establishment of the Philippine Trade and Investment Center and appointment of a commercial attaché at the Philippine Embassy in Riyadh in July 2024.

== Labor relations ==
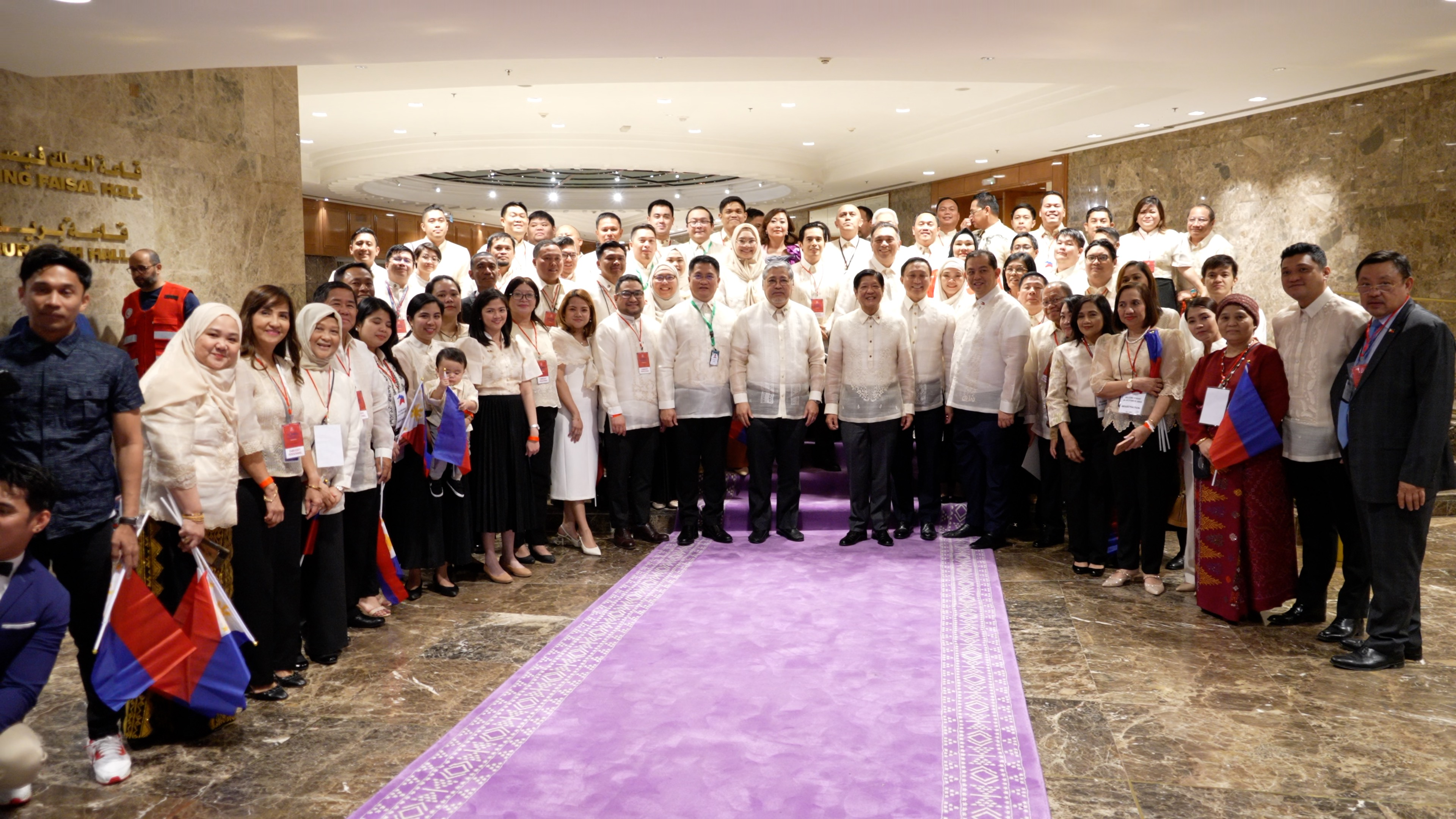
President Ferdinand Bongbong Marcos Jr. meets with Philippine Embassy officials and staff and the Filipino migrant community on the sidelines of the inaugural ASEAN-GCC Summit in Riyadh on October 20, 2023.

The Philippines maintains a Philippine Overseas Labor Office in Riyadh to protect the rights of Overseas Filipinos in Saudi Arabia.

As of June 2013, there were about 674,000 Filipinos working in Saudi Arabia according to the Saudi Ministry of Interior. A landmark agreement on Filipino household service workers was signed between Saudi Arabia and the Philippines. The agreement was the first for Saudi Arabia with a labor-supplying country.

In 2012, about 150,000 Philippine female nurses were working in Saudi Arabia. This accounted for 25 percent of the total number of Overseas Filipino Workers in the Kingdom.

In November 2021, the Philippines stopped processing the deployment of OFWs to Saudi Arabia amidst reports of unpaid salaries and allegations of abuse by a general. This ban was lifted on November 7, 2022.

== Resident diplomatic missions ==
- The Philippines has an embassy in Riyadh and a consulate-general in Jeddah.
- Saudi Arabia has an embassy in Manila.

== See also ==
- Foreign relations of the Philippines
- Foreign relations of Saudi Arabia
- Filipinos in Saudi Arabia
