= List of diplomatic missions in the Philippines =

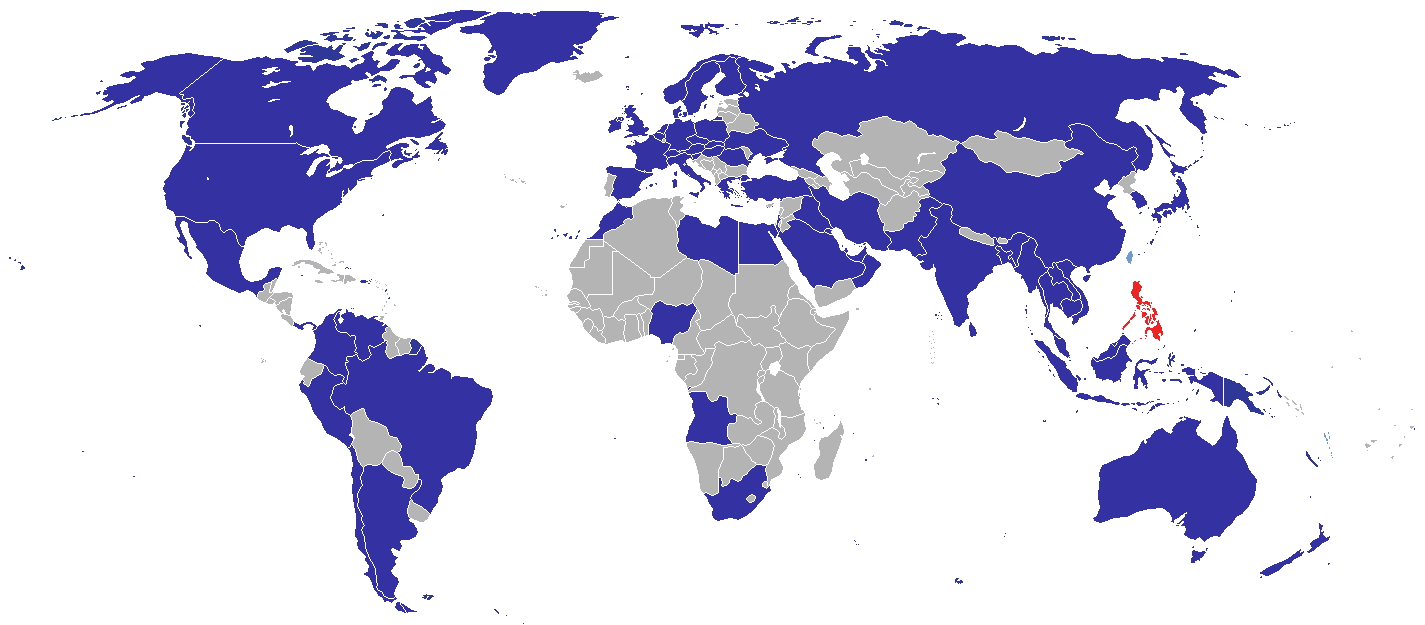
Map of states with diplomatic missions in the Philippines

This is a list of diplomatic missions in the Philippines. The National Capital Region, more commonly known as Metro Manila, is host to 73 embassies. Several other countries have diplomatic missions accredited from other capitals.

Other major cities, namely Cebu and Davao, are host to career consular missions of neighboring Asian countries.

Honorary consulates are excluded from this listing.

== Diplomatic missions in Manila ==
=== Embassies ===
While all of these missions are referred to as embassies in Manila, the majority of their chanceries are physically in the cities of Makati and Taguig rather than Manila proper which hosts only four embassies: the Holy See, the Sovereign Military Order of Malta, the United States, and Vietnam.

Manila (proper)
1. Holy See (article); 2. Sovereign Military Order of Malta; 3. United States (article); 4. Vietnam
Makati
1. Argentina; 2. Australia; 3. Bahrain; 4. Bangladesh; 5. Belgium; 6. Brazil; 7. Brunei; 8. Cambodia; 9. Canada; 10. Chile; 11. China; 12. Czechia; 13. Egypt; 14. France; 15. Germany; 16. Greece; 17. India; 18. Indonesia; 19. Iran; 20. Iraq; 21. Ireland; 22. Libya; 23. Malaysia; 24. Mexico; 25. Myanmar; 26. Netherlands; 27. New Zealand; 28. Nigeria; 29. Pakistan; 30. Palau; 31. Palestine (article); 32. Papua New Guinea; 33. Qatar; 34. Romania; 35. Russia; 36. Saudi Arabia; 37. Slovenia; 38. South Africa; 39. Spain; 40. Sri Lanka; 41. Switzerland; 42. Thailand; 43. Turkey; 44. Ukraine; 45. United Arab Emirates; 46. Venezuela
Taguig
1. Angola; 2. Austria; 3. Colombia; 4. Denmark; 5. Finland; 6. Hungary; 7. Israel (article); 8. Italy; 9. Kuwait; 10. Laos; 11. Morocco; 12. Norway; 13. Oman; 14. Panama; 15. Peru; 16. Poland (article); 17. Singapore (article); 18. Slovakia; 19. South Korea; 20. Sweden; 21. United Kingdom (article)
Pasay	Pasig
1. Japan	1. Timor-Leste

=== Other missions or delegations ===
Entity	Mission type
European Union	Delegation
International Committee of the Red Cross	Delegation
Republic of China (Taiwan)	Economic and Cultural Office
United Nations	Resident Coordinator's Office
World Health Organization	Country Office

=== Gallery ===
Building hosting the embassies of Angola and Laos

Building hosting the embassies of Australia, Canada, Germany, Ireland, Slovenia, South Africa, and Ukraine, and the delegation of the European Union

Building hosting the Czech Embassy

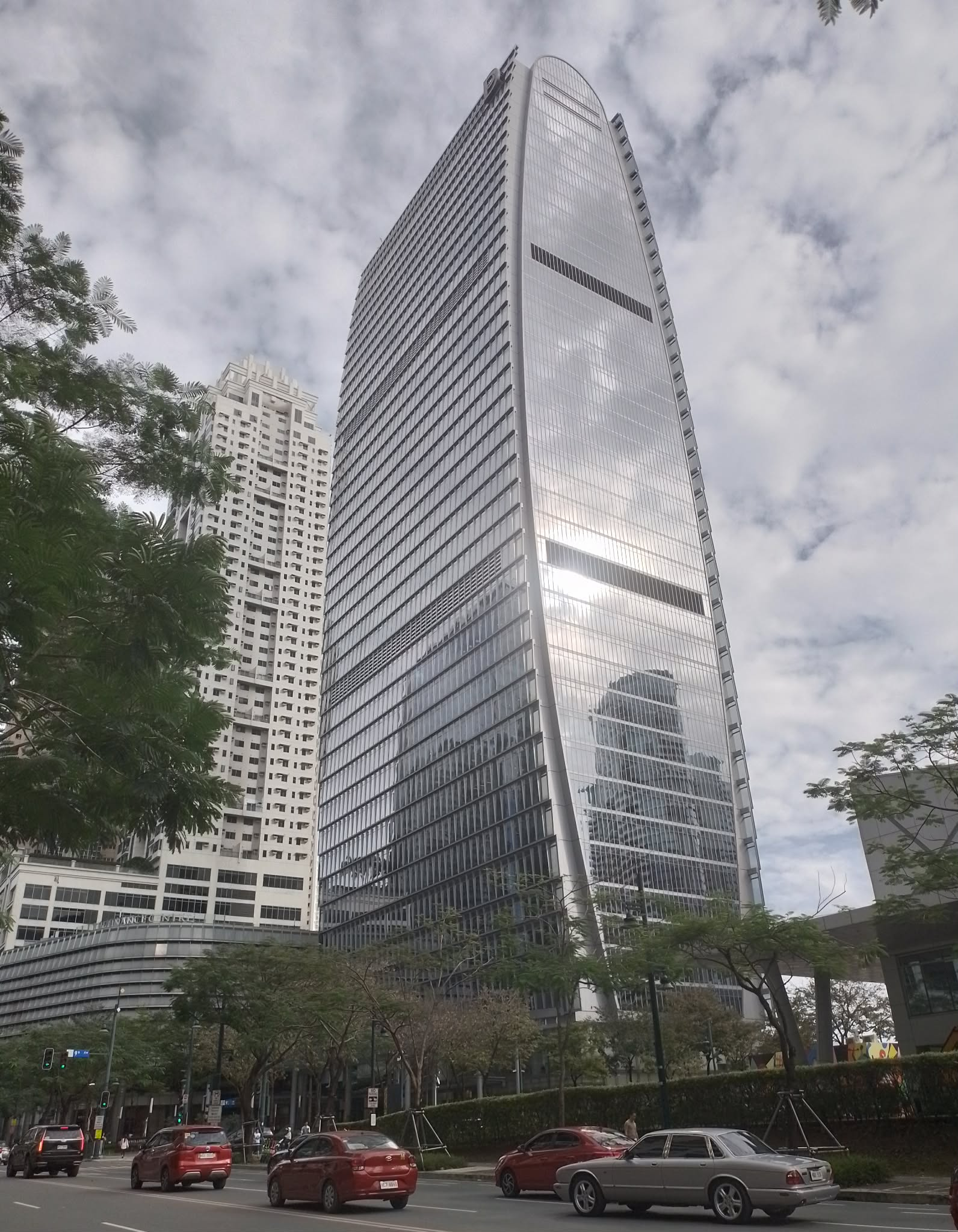
Building hosting the Embassy of Finland

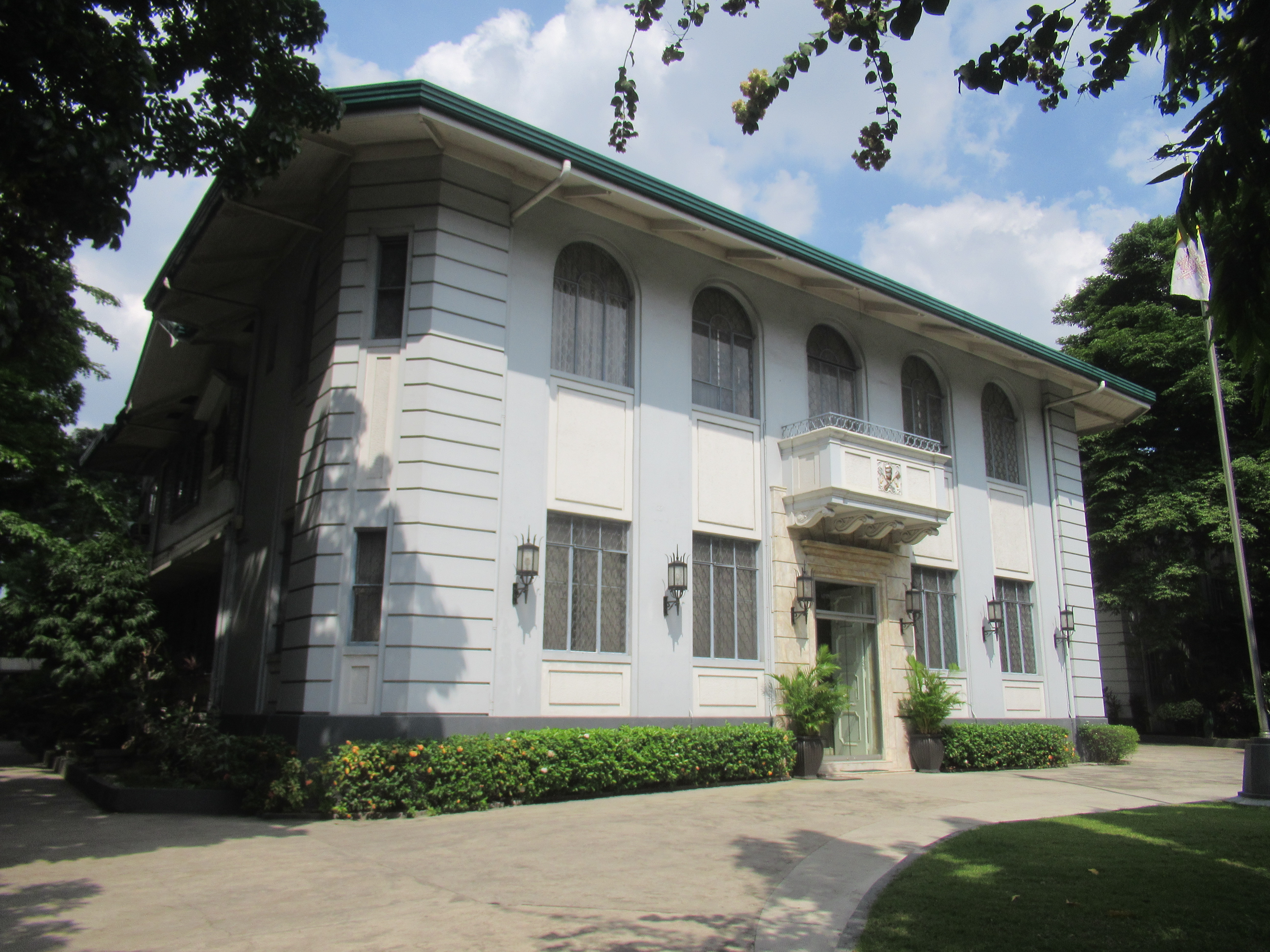
Apostolic Nunciature of the Holy See

Building hosting the embassies of Hungary, Norway, Poland, and Sweden

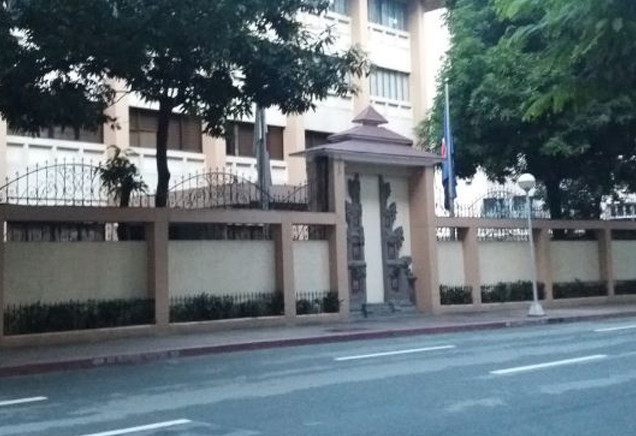
Embassy of Indonesia

Building hosting the Embassy of New Zealand

Embassy of South Korea

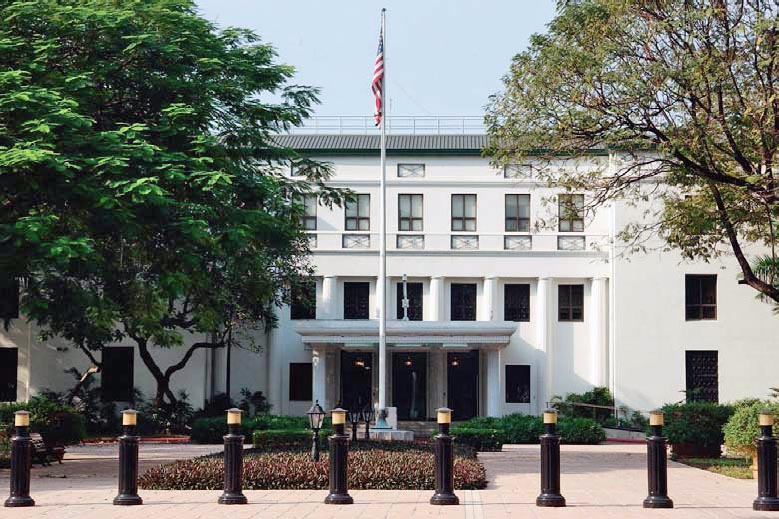
Embassy of the United States

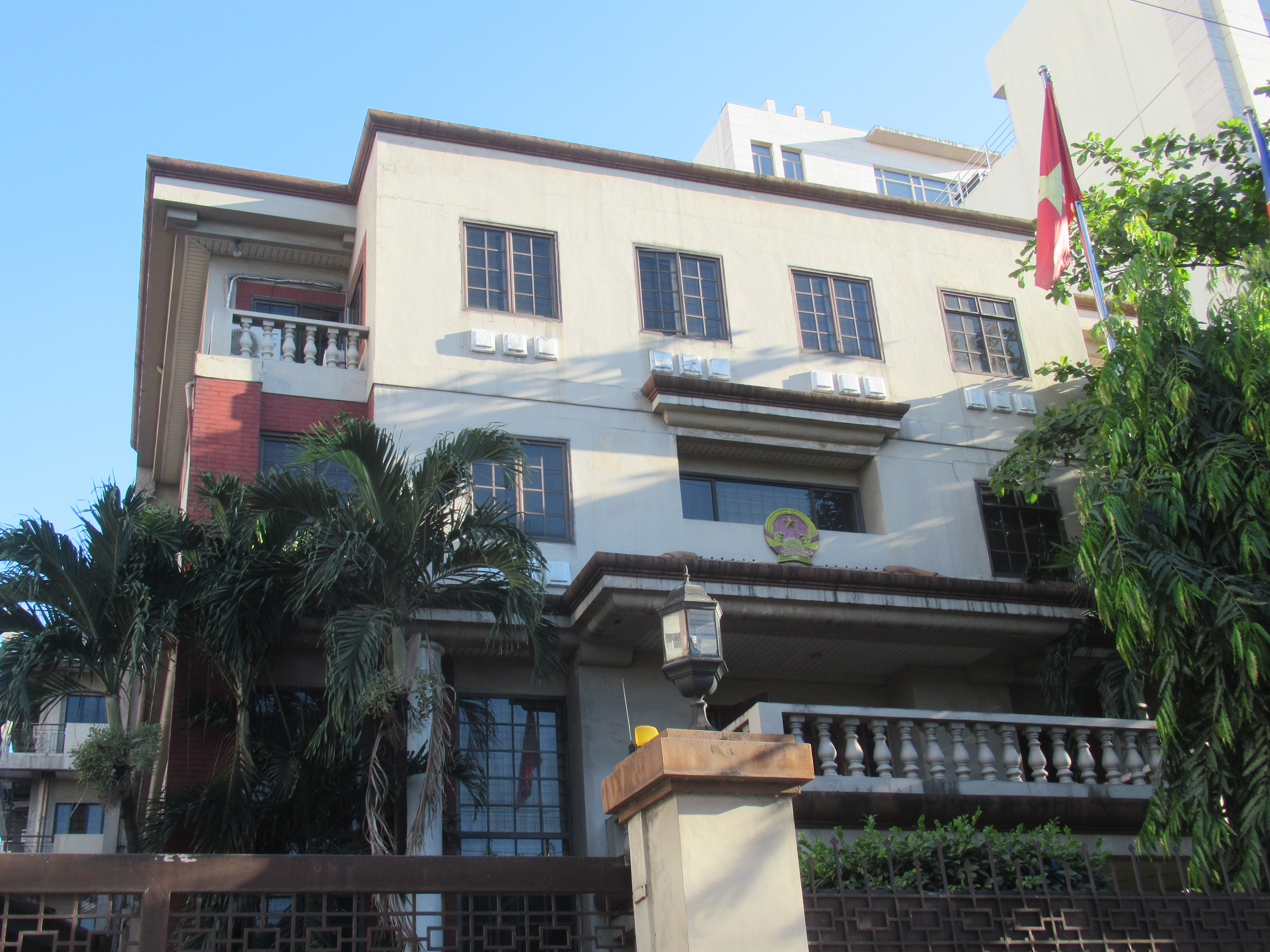
Embassy of Vietnam

== Consular missions ==
Below are the list of career consulates in the Philippines. All listed herein are consulates-general, unless labelled otherwise.

Manila	Cebu City	Davao City	Laoag, Ilocos Norte
1. Vanuatu	1. China; 2. Japan; 3. South Korea (Consulate); 4. United States (Consular agency)	1. China; 2. Indonesia; 3. Japan; 4. Malaysia	1. China (Consulate)

=== Gallery ===
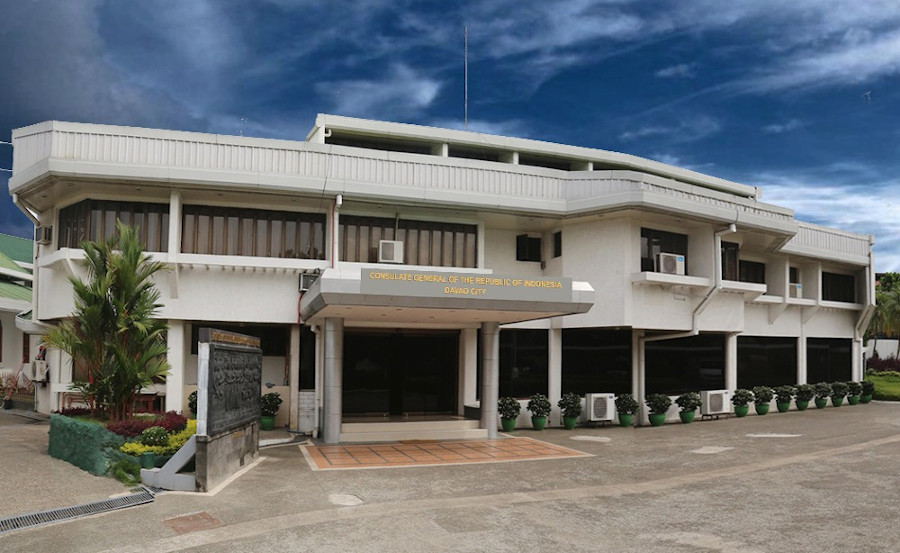
Consulate-General of Indonesia in Davao City

== Non-resident embassies accredited to the Philippines ==
Listed by city of residence.

Taipei, Taiwan	Singapore	Bangkok, Thailand
1. Marshall Islands	1. Costa Rica	1. North Korea
New Delhi, India	1. Costa Rica	1. North Korea
1. Seychelles	1. Costa Rica	1. North Korea
Beijing, China
1. Chad; 2. Burundi; 3. Congo-Brazzaville; 4. Congo-Kinshasa; 5. Equatorial Guinea; 6. Eritrea; 7. Gambia; 8. Guinea-Bissau; 9. Malta; 10. Trinidad and Tobago; 11. Uzbekistan
Hanoi, Vietnam
1. Armenia; 2. Bulgaria; 3. Dominican Republic; 4. Haiti; 5. Nicaragua
Seoul, South Korea
1. Ethiopia; 2. Gabon; 3. Lithuania; 4. Paraguay; 5. Sierra Leone
Jakarta, Indonesia
1. Azerbaijan; 2. Belarus; 3. Croatia; 4. Cyprus; 5. Ecuador; 6. Georgia; 7. Fiji; 8. Kazakhstan; 9. Kenya; 10. Mongolia; 11. Mozambique; 12. Portugal; 13. Serbia; 14. Suriname; 15. Tunisia; 16. Uruguay
Kuala Lumpur, Malaysia
1. Algeria; 2. Cuba; 3. Eswatini; 4. Ghana; 5. Maldives; 6. Mauritius; 7. Namibia; 8. Nepal; 9. Senegal; 10. Somalia; 11. Sudan; 12. Tanzania; 13. Uganda; 14. Yemen; 15. Zambia; 16. Zimbabwe
Tokyo, Japan
1. Albania; 2. Benin; 3. Botswana; 4. Burkina Faso; 5. Djibouti; 6. Estonia; 7. Guatemala; 8. Guinea; 9. Honduras; 10. Iceland; 11. Ivory Coast; 12. Jamaica; 13. Jordan; 14. Kyrgyzstan; 15. Lebanon; 16. Lesotho; 17. Liberia; 18. Luxembourg; 19. Madagascar; 20. Malawi; 21. Mali; 22. Mauritania; 23. Micronesia; 24. Rwanda; 25. Samoa; 26. Turkmenistan

=== Unverified locations ===
1. Afghanistan (Tokyo)
2. Bahamas (Beijing)
3. Barbados (Beijing)
4. Bolivia (Tokyo)
5. Cameroon (Beijing)
6. Cape Verde (Beijing)
7. Central African Republic (Beijing)
8. Comoros (Beijing)
9. El Salvador (Tokyo)
10. Guyana (Beijing)
11. Niger (Beijing)
12. San Marino (Jakarta)
13. South Sudan (Beijing)
14. Syria (Kuala Lumpur)
15. Togo (Tokyo)

== Closed missions ==
Host city	Sending country	Mission	Year closed	Ref.
Manila	Bulgaria	Embassy	1991	
Manila	Cuba	Embassy	2013	
Manila	Gabon	Embassy	1986	
Manila	Marshall Islands	Embassy	Unknown	
Manila	Portugal	Embassy	2011	
Manila	Republic of China (Taiwan)	Embassy (Note: Continues as the Taipei Economic and Cultural Office in the Philippines)	1975	
Manila	South Vietnam	Embassy (Note: The South Vietnamese embassy was closed upon the fall of Saigon in April 1975, thus marking the end of the Vietnam War and the start of a transition period to the formal reunification of Vietnam.)	1975	
Cebu City	United States	Consulate	Unknown	
Davao City	Republic of China (Taiwan)	Consulate-General	1975	
Davao City	United States	Consulate	Unknown	

== See also ==
- Foreign relations of the Philippines
- List of ambassadors to the Philippines
- List of diplomatic missions of the Philippines
- Visa requirements for Philippine citizens
- Visa policy of the Philippines
