= Rafael Seguis =

Filipino politician (born 1939)

- Born: Rafael Espuerta Seguis; October 24, 1939; Anao-aon, Surigao, Philippine Islands
- Education: University of the East; Ateneo de Manila University; American University of Cairo
- Occupation: Diplomat

Rafael Espuerta Seguis (born October 24, 1939) is a retired Filipino diplomat who served as Philippine ambassador to Indonesia (2002-2003), Saudi Arabia (1999-2002), and Iraq (1991-1996). He also served as Department of Foreign Affairs undersecretary for Special and Ocean Concerns (2003-2010) and for Administration (2010-2016).

== Early life and education ==
Seguis was born in Anao-aon, Surigao (now part of Surigao del Norte), Philippines. He obtained a bachelor's degree in accountancy from the University of the East and later pursued postgraduate studies at the Ateneo de Manila University and the American University of Cairo.

== Notable contributions ==
Seguis is known for his contributions to peace negotiations and crisis management.

He undertook sensitive missions for the Philippine government, notably in the areas of anti-terrorism, maritime and territorial delimitations, the country’s bid for observer status in the Organization of Islamic Cooperation (OIC), and the conduct of overseas absentee voting during national elections. In 2004, he was tasked to negotiate on two occasions for the safe release of Filipinos held hostage by Iraqi insurgents. After extended stays in battle-scarred Baghdad and the Iraqi countryside, he was able to bring them home to their loved ones. When peace talks with the Moro Islamic Liberation Front collapsed in 2008 and the Philippine negotiating panel had to be reconstituted, Seguis did not demur when asked by then-President Gloria Macapagal Arroyo to head the peace negotiating panel. His vast experience, an unrelenting capacity for sustained work, and a characteristic low-key approach have earned him a reputation as an indispensable troubleshooter within the Philippine government.
