= Chad–Germany relations =

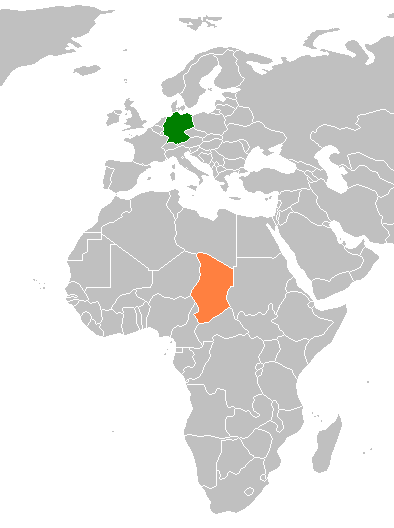

- Chad: Germany

Chad–Germany relations are the relations between Chad and Germany. Contacts between the two societies can be traced back to the expeditions of German adventurers in the 19th century. Later, some areas of present-day Chad were part of the German colonial empire for a short time. Diplomatic relations between the Federal Republic of Germany and Chad began in 1960

== History ==
In 1800, the German explorer Friedrich Konrad Hornemann reached present-day Chad and explored this region, which was then virtually unknown to Europeans, on behalf of the British African Association. Half a century later, Heinrich Barth and Adolf Overweg reached Lake Chad. Further expeditions followed, during which the German astronomer and Africa explorer Eduard Vogel died in 1856 at the hands of Wara, possibly on the orders of the Sultan of Wadai. The unexplained fate of Vogel attracted a great deal of attention in his homeland. The geographer August Petermann even set up a foundation to clarify his disappearance. Rescue expeditions by Richard Freiherr von Neimans, Charles Cuny, Karl Moritz von Beurmann and Theodor von Heuglin were sent, but ended without result. Von Beurmann also died in search of Vogel in Mao at Lake Chad; he was presumably also murdered on behalf of the Sultan of Wadai. It was only Gustav Nachtigal who finally clarified the tragic fate of Beurmann and Vogel when he traveled to eastern Chad in 1872.

In 1901, Curt von Pavel, the commander of the protection force in Cameroon, led a campaign in northern Cameroon that took him into French spheres of influence as far as the Lake Chad basin. In 1903, German Chad Sea countries became a residency of the German colony of Cameroon, which was under indirect German rule with local rulers as vassals. In 1911, France ceded New Cameroon (which included the area around the town of Léré) to German Cameroon and got some areas in German Chad in return. During World War I, all German territories in Chad fell to France, which was later confirmed by the Treaty of Versailles. During World War II, German forces in Africa considered an advance to Lake Chad in 1942 to cut off Allied supply routes through the Sahara, but this proved unfeasible. In the same year, German aircraft also bombed Fort-Lamy airport.

Chad established diplomatic relations with the Federal Republic of Germany in 1960, and a German Embassy was opened in N'Djamena two years later. Chad also established relations with the German Democratic Republic in 1971. In April 1974, a serious incident occurred when a German doctor, Christoph Staewen, was taken hostage by rebels under the command of Hissène Habré. As a condition for his release, the rebels were allowed to call for the overthrow of the Chadian government on the Deutsche Welle foreign language radio station. In response, Chad broke off diplomatic relations with the Federal Republic and had all Germans in the country expelled. Staewen was eventually released in exchange for a 2.2 million Deutschmark ransom, and Habré later came to power in Chad. Diplomatic relations between the FRG and Chad were finally resumed in November 1974, and the German Embassy in the country was reopened in 1976.

Chad's President Idriss Déby visited Germany for the first time in October 2016. Democratic elections promised under his successor and son Mahamat Déby were not held, prompting criticism from Germany's ambassador Gordon Kricke. In response, the Chadian government expelled Kricke in April 2023 for “rude behavior”. In response, the German Foreign Office called on Mariam Ali Moussa, the Chadian ambassador in Berlin, to leave the country within 48 hours. After the holding of elections (which Mahamat Déby won), a German ambassador was finally reinstated. In December 2024, the German Development Minister Svenja Schulze visited Chad to discuss the provision of supplies to displaced persons from the war in Sudan who had fled to the neighboring country. After coups in Mali, Burkina Faso and Niger, the Chadian regime had become the West's last ally in the region.

== Economic relations ==
Mutual trade in goods is low and only a few German companies are active in Chad. In 2024, German goods exports to Chad amounted to 23.9 million euros and imports from the country to 951 million euros, mostly raw materials. Chad thus ranked 91st in the list of Germany's trading partners.

== Development cooperation ==
The Deutsche Gesellschaft für Internationale Zusammenarbeit (GIZ) and its predecessor organizations have been active in Chad since 1970. In 2024, GIZ had a presence in Chad with almost 200 employees. In 2011/2012, Germany discontinued its bilateral development cooperation. However, projects in Chad continue to be financed. In doing so, Germany prefers to work with local authorities, civil society organizations and international organizations, bypassing the central government, which is considered corrupt and accused of human rights violations. One focus of German development aid in the country is on improving living conditions and providing for refugees.
