= Germany–Philippines relations =

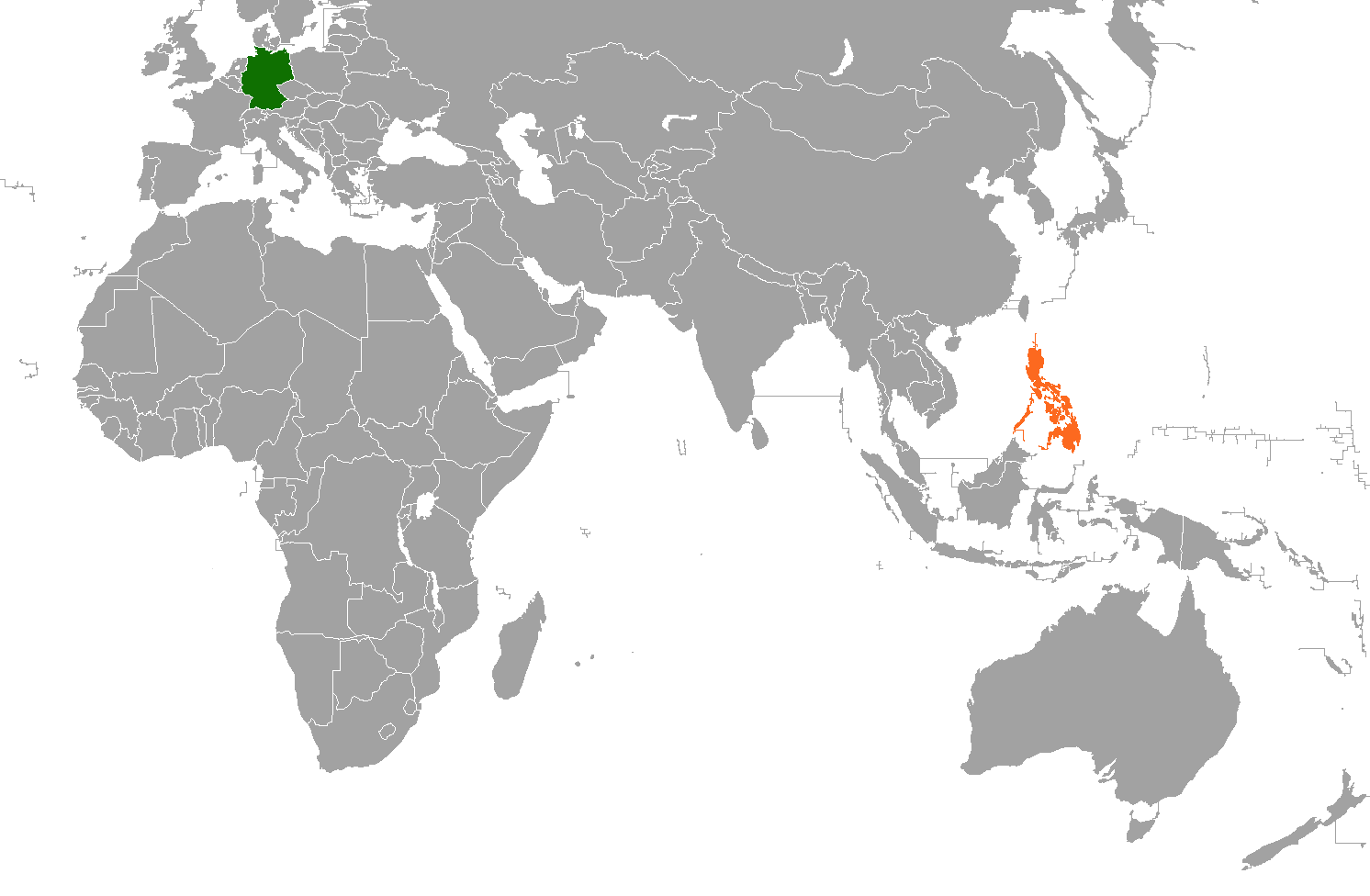

- Germany: Philippines

Diplomatic mission
- Embassy of Germany, Manila: Embassy of the Philippines, Berlin

Envoy
- Ambassador Andreas Michael Pfaffernoschke: Ambassador Maria Teresa T. Almojuela

Germany–Philippines relations are the bilateral relations of Germany and the Philippines. An agreement that was signed on April 25, 1955, led to a dynamic cooperation between the two countries. Germany has an embassy in Manila and an honorary consulate in Cebu, while the Philippines has an embassy in Berlin, a Consulate General in Frankfurt, and Honorary Consulates in Essen, Munich and Stuttgart. Germany is the top trading partner of the Philippines in the European Union after the Netherlands, France, and the United Kingdom.

== History ==
The German-Filipino relations start goes back to the 19th-century national hero José Rizal, who lived in Germany for some time and finished writing his famous novel Noli Me Tangere while living there, and published it with the assistance of professor Ferdinand Blumentritt; the house where Rizal lived in Berlin sports a commemorative plaque, and efforts are underway to purchase the building from its owner. A life-size statue of Jose Rizal stands in a fountain in a small park in Wilhelmsfeld, Heidelberg.

Before and during the revolution, Germany expressed interest in the Philippines and its acquisition. More specifically, in a communication to Paul von Hatzfeldt, the German ambassador to the United Kingdom, by then-Secretary of State of Foreign Affairs Bernhard von Bülow, a list was given in which it included areas that the German government was interested in acquiring, which included the Philippine island of Mindanao.

In January 1899, Teodoro Sandiko was contacted by German diplomat Gotthard Klocke, leading to shipment of Krupp guns to the Philippine Republic, for their Republican Army. It was soon revealed by Chicago Tribune on February 28, 1899, while the shipment was still on its way. The Philippine Republic only managed to get a few of the Krupp Guns during the Philippine-American War.

In 1951, the Federal Republic of Germany had tripled its import of Philippine goods in comparison to its exports to the Philippines. Although given the fact that there is still a concession that the two countries are still at war, there had been no attempts to exchange diplomatic representatives on both sides.

On February 19, 1954, former Senator Lorenzo Tañada Sr. introduced in the Philippine senate, a resolution which provided for a termination of war between the Republic of the Philippines and Germany. The senate, subsequently, ratified the bill which announced the acceptance of the official relations between the two countries.

Mass migration from the Philippines to Germany began in the late 1960s, with large numbers of Filipina nurses taking up employment in German hospitals; however, with the onset of the 1973 oil crisis, German recruitment of gastarbeiter largely came to a halt. Hiring of Filipina nurses restarted in 2013, as part of the Agreement between German Federal Employment Agency and Philippine Overseas Employment Administration. Immigration through marriage began in the 1980s, with roughly 1,000 women a year applying at the Philippine Embassy for a Certificate of Legal Capacity to Contract Marriage up until 1990.

== Bilateral relation ==
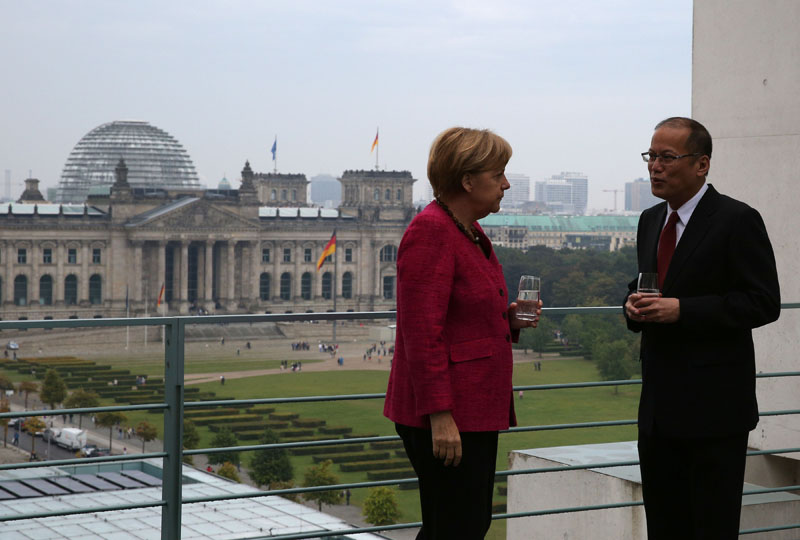
Philippine President Benigno Aquino III meets with German Chancellor Angela Merkel in Berlin, September 19, 2014

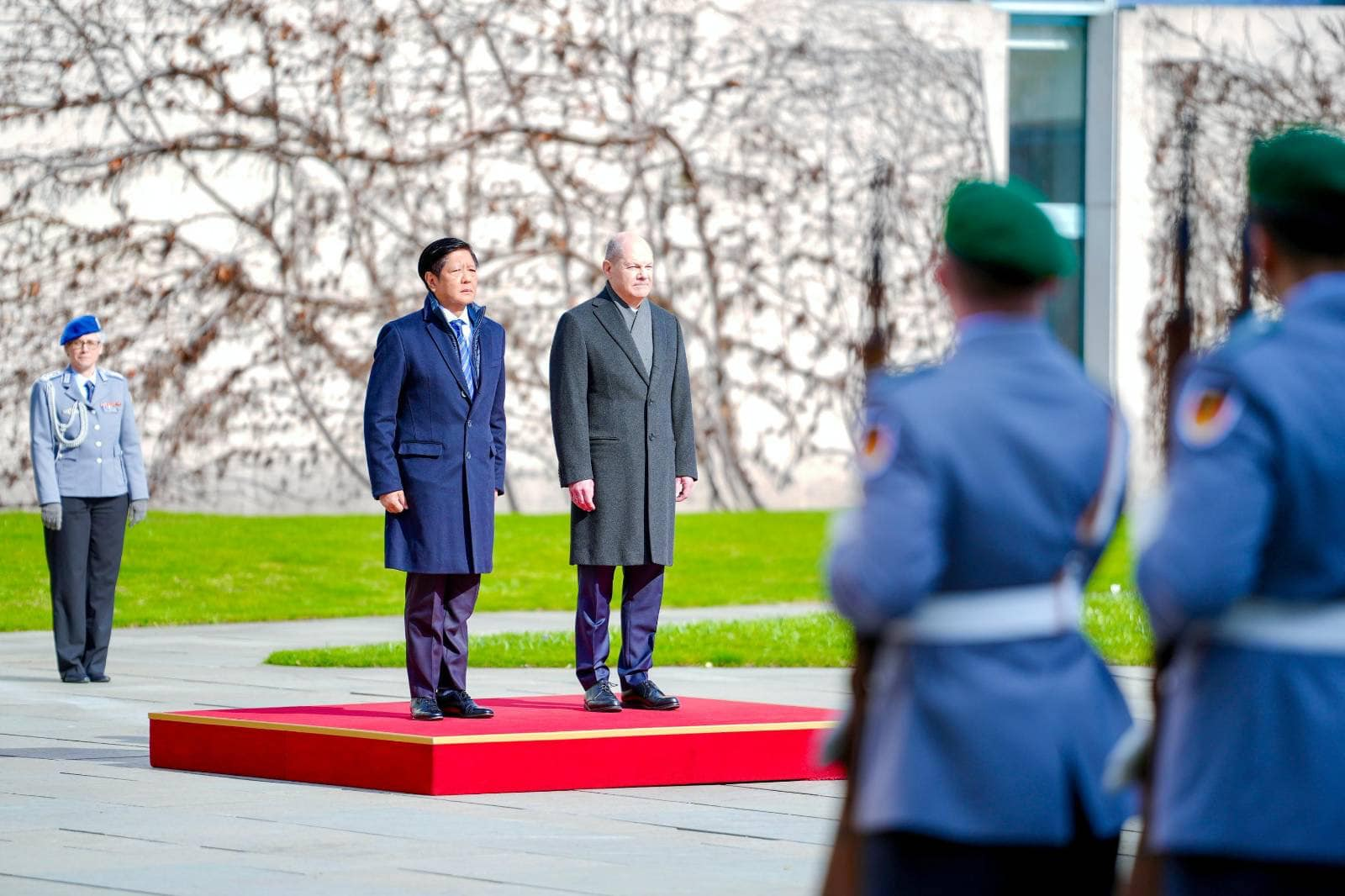
Philippine President Bongbong Marcos with German Chancellor Olaf Scholz in Berlin, March 12, 2024

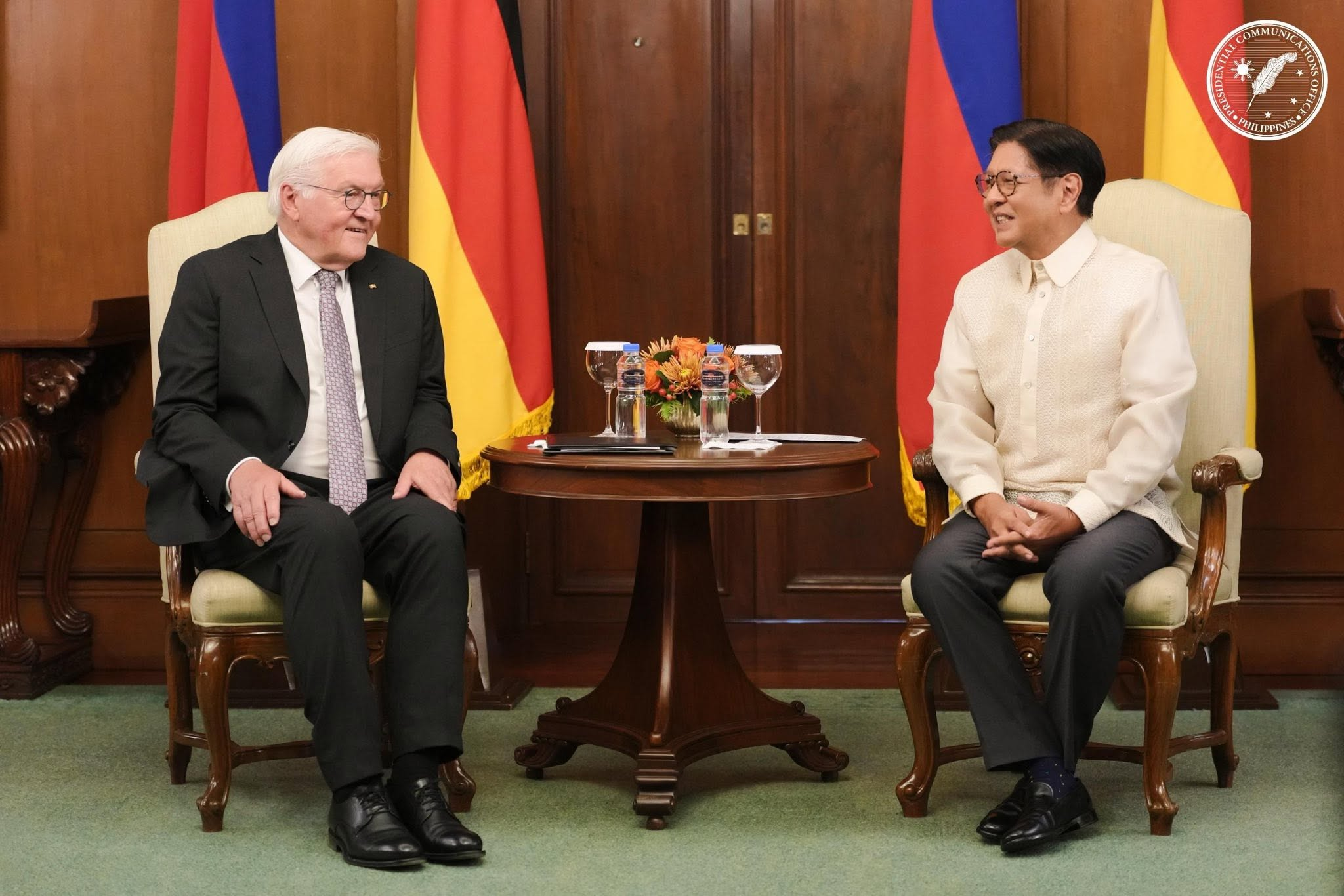
German President Frank-Walter Steinmeier with Philippine President Bongbong Marcos during a state visit to Manila, June 6, 2026

Philippine Secretary of Foreign Affairs Albert del Rosario visited Germany in December 2011. He met with his counterpart German Foreign Minister Guido Westerwelle. Also, German Foreign Minister Westerwelle visited the Philippines in February 2013 accompanied by a German business delegation. He held talks with President Benigno Aquino III and Foreign Affairs Secretary Albert del Rosario. Germany and the Philippines history have come to some peculiar intersections like the Battle of Manila Bay. As recounted by Former President Fidel V. Ramos during the inauguration of the Mabuhay Germany expo in 2008, German ships were closely watching during the siege, awaiting the outcome.

Two Presidents of Germany have undertaken state visits to the Philippines: Heinrich Lübke (as President of West Germany) in 1963 and Frank-Walter Steinmeier in 2026.

== Filipinos in Germany ==
There are more than 60,000 Filipinos in Germany consisting of people from various walks of life, including migrant workers in the medical sector and marine-based industries, as well as a number of women married to German men they met through international marriage agencies. Filipinos in Germany have established more than one hundred civic organizations. Karaoke contests are a particularly popular form of social gathering. Church-based volunteer work is also widespread and has been particularly successful in encouraging social engagement by female migrants, aimed at assisting the local Filipino community as well as raising money for charity projects in the Philippines. Filipinos are well-integrated into German society, viewed by their neighbors as hardworking, skillful and peaceful. According to a 1997 survey by the Netherlands' Universiteit van Tilburg, 75% feel they have no problems with cultural or linguistic adjustment. Reliable estimates on the number of Filipinos in Germany are difficult to obtain. The German embassy to the Philippines estimated that 35,000 Filipino citizens worked in Germany as of 2008, and that another 30,000 had naturalized as German citizens. Roughly 1,300 Filipinos acquire German citizenship each year. Official figures of the Federal Statistical Office of Germany showed 23,171 Filipinos residing in the country as of 2003; that number did not include Filipinos naturalized as German citizens, nor those who resided in the country illegally. A 2007 study by scholars of the Philippine Migration Research Network suggested that the number of illegal residents might be as high as 40,000. However, the Philippine consulate-general claims that the number of Filipinos illegally residing in Germany is very small. As a result of the early female-dominated migration of nurses, the Filipino community in Germany is heavily gender-imbalanced, with nearly 3.5 women for every man, according to the Federal Statistical Office of Germany. Only in Hamburg is this ratio reversed.

- North Rhine-Westphalia – 4,517
- Hesse – 3,682
- Bavaria – 3,503
- Baden-Wurttemberg – 3,282

== Germans in the Philippines ==
German settlement in the Philippines began during the Colonial era when the German Empire attempted to acquire the Philippines. This also refers to Filipino citizens of either pure or mixed German descent currently residing in the country. In recent years, several German businesses have set up shop in the Philippines, and a number of Germans have chosen the Philippines as their new residence. In the Philippines, since its formation in January 1906, the German Club has provided a place of respite and interaction for Germans and Filipinos alike. In the past century, it has stood witness to the country's unfolding history and today enjoys the regular patronage of members and guests at its current location in Legaspi Village in Makati City.

Around 4000–6000 Germans work, study or just live in the Philippines. 52 German companies were based in the Philippines in 2009.

== Resident diplomatic missions ==
- Germany has an embassy in Manila.
- the Philippines has an embassy in Berlin and a consulate–general in Frankfurt.
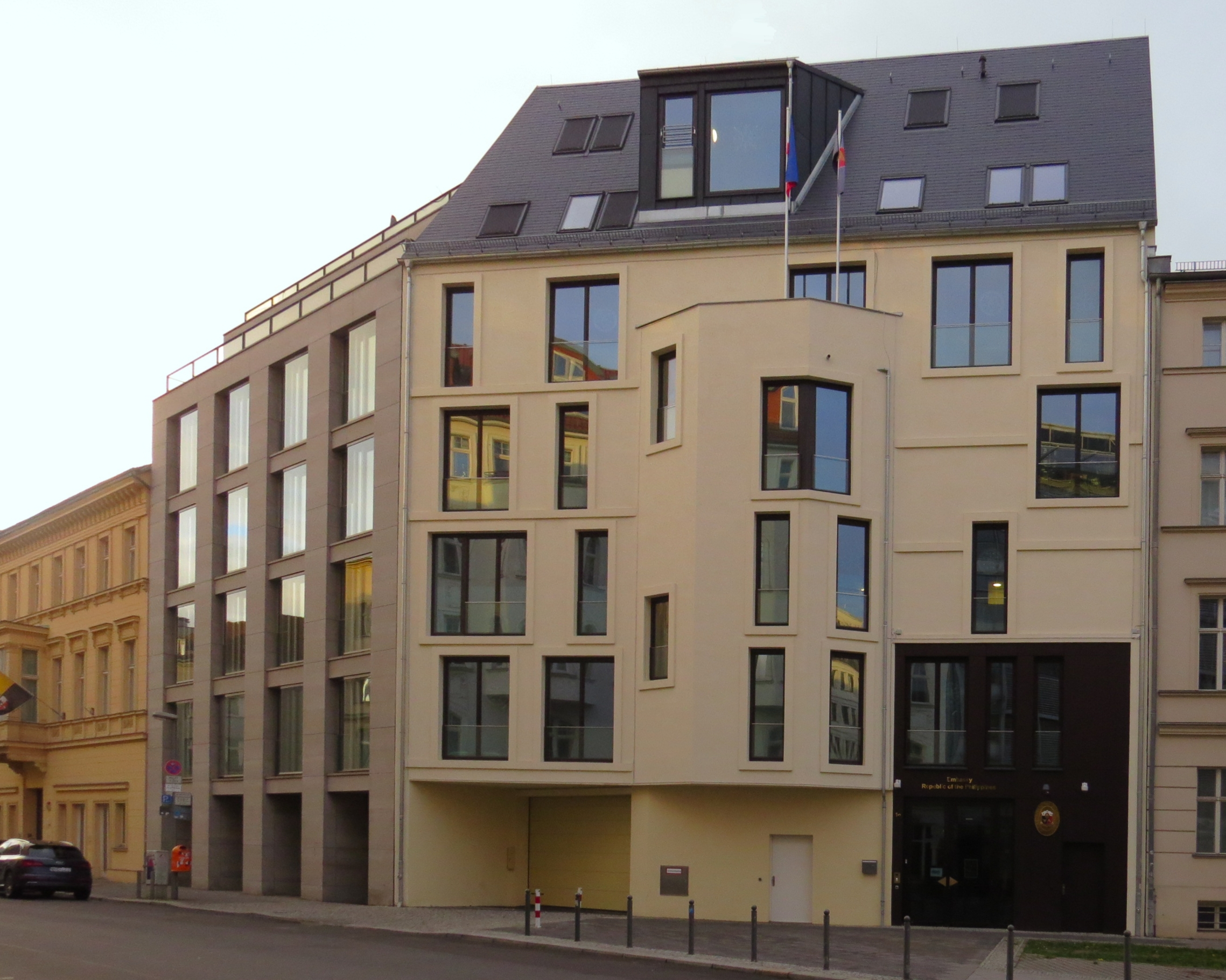
Embassy of the Philippines in Berlin

== See also ==
- Foreign relations of Germany
- Foreign relations of the Philippines
- Germans in the Philippines
- Filipinos in Germany
- Philippine Consulate General, Frankfurt
