= List of ambassadors of Germany to the Philippines =

Ambassador of the Federal Republic of Germany to the Republic of the Philippines
- Botschafter der Bundesrepublik Deutschland in der Republik der Philippinen; Sugo ng Republikang Pederal ng Alemanya sa Republika ng Pilipinas
- Incumbent; Andreas Pfaffernoschke since 7 September 2023
- Federal Foreign Office; Embassy of Germany, Manila
- Style: His Excellency
- Reports to: Federal Minister for Foreign Affairs
- Seat: Makati City, Metro Manila
- Inaugural holder: Friedrich Leopold Freiherr von Fürstenberg (FRG); Eberhard Feister (GDR)
- Formation: 9 February 1956 (FRG); 21 September 1973 (GDR)
- Final holder: Joachim Wittwer (GDR)
- Abolished: 3 October 1990 (GDR)
- Website: Official website of the German Embassy, Manila

The ambassador of the Federal Republic of Germany to the Republic of the Philippines (German: Botschafter der Bundesrepublik Deutschland in der Republik der Philippinen, Filipino: Sugo ng Republikang Pederal ng Alemanya sa Republika ng Pilipinas) is the Federal Republic of Germany's foremost diplomatic representative in the Philippines. As head of Germany's diplomatic mission there, the ambassador is the official representative of the president and the government of Germany to the president and the government of the Philippines. The position has the rank and status of an ambassador extraordinary and plenipotentiary and is based in Makati, Metro Manila.

The German ambassador to the Philippines is also accredited as non-resident ambassador to the Marshall Islands, the Federated States of Micronesia and Palau.

== List of heads of mission ==
=== Ambassadors to West Germany ===
Name	Image	Term Start	Term End	West German head of State	West German chancellor	Philippine president	Notes
Friedrich Leopold Freiherr von Fürstenberg		1956	1963	Theodor Heuss (as President of West Germany); Heinrich Lübke	Konrad Adenauer (as Chancellor of West Germany); Ludwig Erhard	Ramon Magsaysay; Carlos P. Garcia; Diosdado Macapagal	
Günther Schlegelberger		1963	1963	Heinrich Lübke; Gustav Heinemann	Ludwig Erhard; Kurt Georg Kiesinger; Willy Brandt	Ramon Magsaysay; Carlos P. Garcia; Diosdado Macapagal	
Franz Ferring		1963	1964	Heinrich Lübke; Gustav Heinemann	Ludwig Erhard; Kurt Georg Kiesinger; Willy Brandt	Ramon Magsaysay; Carlos P. Garcia; Diosdado Macapagal	
Johann Karl von Stechow		1964	1967	Heinrich Lübke; Gustav Heinemann	Ludwig Erhard; Kurt Georg Kiesinger; Willy Brandt	Diosdado Macapagal; Ferdinand Marcos	
Heinrich Röhreke		1967	1969	Heinrich Lübke; Gustav Heinemann	Ludwig Erhard; Kurt Georg Kiesinger; Willy Brandt	Ferdinand Marcos	
Jobst von Buddenbrock		1970	1974	Gustav Heinemann; Walter Scheel; Karl Carstens	Willy Brandt; Walter Scheel (acting); Helmut Schmidt	Ferdinand Marcos	
Wolfgang Eger	Wolfgang Eger	1974	1980	Gustav Heinemann; Walter Scheel; Karl Carstens	Willy Brandt; Walter Scheel (acting); Helmut Schmidt	Ferdinand Marcos	
Hildegunde Feilner		1980	1983	Karl Carstens; Richard von Weizsäcker	Helmut Schmidt; Helmut Kohl	Ferdinand Marcos	
Klaus Zeller		1983	1986	Karl Carstens; Richard von Weizsäcker	Helmut Kohl	Ferdinand Marcos; Corazon Aquino	
Peter Scholz		1986	1990	Karl Carstens; Richard von Weizsäcker	Helmut Kohl	Corazon Aquino	

=== Ambassadors of East Germany ===
Name	Image	Term Start	Term End	East German head of State	East German head of government	Philippine president	Notes
Eberhard Feister		1978	1980	Erich Honecker; Egon Krenz	Willi Stoph; Hans Modrow	Ferdinand Marcos; Corazon Aquino	First and only non-resident ambassador; served from the East German embassy in Jakarta, Indonesia.
Kurt Merkel		1981	1986	Erich Honecker; Egon Krenz	Willi Stoph; Hans Modrow	Ferdinand Marcos; Corazon Aquino	
Eberhard Kunz		1986	1989	Erich Honecker; Egon Krenz	Willi Stoph; Hans Modrow	Corazon Aquino	
Joachim Wittwer		1989	1990	Manfred Gerlach; Sabine Bergmann-Pohl	Hans Modrow; Lothar de Maizière	Corazon Aquino	
Diplomatic relations between East Germany and the Philippines were terminated after the reunification.

=== Ambassadors of Germany (since the reunification) ===
Name	Image	Term Start	Term End	German head of State	German chancellor	Philippine president	Notes
Peter Scholz		1990	1994	Richard von Weizsäcker (later as President of the reunified Federal Republic of Germany); Roman Herzog	Helmut Kohl (later as Chancellor of the reunified Federal Republic of Germany)	Corazon Aquino; Fidel V. Ramos	First ambassador of the newly reunified Germany to the Philippines.
Karl-Friedrich Gansäuer		1995	1997	Roman Herzog; Johannes Rau	Helmut Kohl; Gerhard Schröder	Fidel V. Ramos; Joseph Estrada	
Wolfgang Göttelmann		1998	2000	Roman Herzog; Johannes Rau	Helmut Kohl; Gerhard Schröder	Fidel V. Ramos; Joseph Estrada	
Herbert Jess		2000	2004	Roman Herzog; Johannes Rau	Gerhard Schröder; Angela Merkel	Joseph Estrada; Gloria Macapagal Arroyo	
Axel Weishaupt		2004	2007	Horst Köhler	Angela Merkel	Gloria Macapagal Arroyo; Benigno Aquino III	
Christian-Ludwig Weber-Lortsch		2007	2011	Horst Köhler; Jens Böhrnsen (acting); Christian Wulff	Angela Merkel	Gloria Macapagal Arroyo; Benigno Aquino III	
Joachim Heidorn		2011	2013	Christian Wulff; Horst Seehofer (acting); Joachim Gauck	Angela Merkel	Benigno Aquino III; Rodrigo Duterte	Credentials were presented to President Benigno Aquino III on 4 October 2011.
Thomas Ossowski		2014	2016	Christian Wulff; Horst Seehofer (acting); Joachim Gauck	Angela Merkel	Benigno Aquino III; Rodrigo Duterte	Credentials were presented to President Benigno Aquino III on 8 April 2014.
Gordon Kricke		2016	2019	Joachim Gauck; Frank-Walter Steinmeier	Angela Merkel	Rodrigo Duterte; Bongbong Marcos	
Anke Reiffenstuel	Anke Reiffenstuel	2019	2023	Frank-Walter Steinmeier	Angela Merkel; Olaf Scholz	Rodrigo Duterte; Bongbong Marcos	Credentials were presented to President Rodrigo Duterte on 20 August 2019.
Andreas Pfaffernoschke		2023	present	Frank-Walter Steinmeier	Olaf Scholz; Friedrich Merz	Bongbong Marcos	Credentials were presented to President Bongbong Marcos on 17 August 2023.

== See also ==
- Philippines–Germany relations
- List of ambassadors of the Philippines to Germany
