= List of ambassadors of the Philippines to Germany =

Ambassador of the Republic of the Philippines to the Federal Republic of Germany
- Sugo ng Republika ng Pilipinas sa Republikang Pederal ng Alemanya; Botschafter der Republik der Philippinen in der Bundesrepublik Deutschland
- Seal of the Department of Foreign Affairs of the Philippines
- Incumbent; Maria Teresa T. Almojuela since 6 March 2026
- Department of Foreign Affairs; Embassy of the Philippines, Berlin
- Style: Her Excellency
- Reports to: Department of Foreign Affairs
- Seat: Berlin, Germany
- Nominator: Secretary of Foreign Affairs
- Appointer: President of the Philippines; with the advice and consent of the Commission on Appointments
- Term length: No fixed term
- Inaugural holder: Jose D. Ingles
- Formation: 8 October 1954
- Website: Philippine Embassy, Berlin

The ambassador of the Republic of the Philippines to the Federal Republic of Germany (Filipino: Sugo ng Republika ng Pilipinas sa Republikang Pederal ng Alemanya; German: Botschafter der Republik der Philippinen in der Bundesrepublik Deutschland) is the Republic of the Philippines' foremost diplomatic representative in the Federal Republic of Germany. As head of the Philippines' diplomatic mission there, the ambassador is the official representative of the president and the government of the Philippines to the president and government of Germany. The position has the rank and status of an ambassador extraordinary and plenipotentiary and is based at the embassy located in Berlin.

== Heads of mission ==
Head of mission	Tenure	German head of State	German chancellor	Philippine president	Note(s)
Leon Maria Guerrero III	1952 – 1956	Theodor Heuss (as President of West Germany)	Konrad Adenauer (as Chancellor of West Germany)	Elpidio Quirino; Ramon Magsaysay	Non-resident envoy, accredited from the Philippine Embassy in London.
Jose D. Ingles	1956 – 1963	Theodor Heuss; Heinrich Lübke	Konrad Adenauer; Ludwig Erhard	Ramon Magsaysay; Carlos P. Garcia; Diosdado Macapagal	
Melchor Aquino	1963 – 1966	Theodor Heuss; Heinrich Lübke	Ludwig Erhard; Kurt Georg Kiesinger	Diosdado Macapagal; Ferdinand Marcos	
Emilio Bejasa	1966 – 1968	Theodor Heuss; Heinrich Lübke	Ludwig Erhard; Kurt Georg Kiesinger	Ferdinand Marcos	
Pedro Ramirez	1968 – 1970	Heinrich Lübke; Gustav Heinemann	Kurt Georg Kiesinger; Willy Brandt	Ferdinand Marcos	
Jose V. Cruz	1970 – 1972	Heinrich Lübke; Gustav Heinemann	Kurt Georg Kiesinger; Willy Brandt	Ferdinand Marcos	
Mauro Calingo	1972 – 1977	Gustav Heinemann; Walter Scheel	Willy Brandt; Walter Scheel (acting); Helmut Schmidt	Ferdinand Marcos	
Gregorio Abad	1977 – 1984	Walter Scheel; Karl Carstens	Helmut Schmidt; Helmut Kohl	Ferdinand Marcos	
Ramon V. Del Rosario	1984 – 1986	Karl Carstens; Richard von Weizsäcker	Helmut Kohl (later as Chancellor of the reunified Federal Republic of Germany)	Ferdinand Marcos	
Augusto Caesar Espiritu	1986 – 1989	Richard von Weizsäcker (later as President of the reunified Federal Republic of Germany)	Helmut Kohl (later as Chancellor of the reunified Federal Republic of Germany)	Ferdinand Marcos; Corazon Aquino	
Bienvenido Tan	1989 – 1994	Richard von Weizsäcker (later as President of the reunified Federal Republic of Germany)	Helmut Kohl (later as Chancellor of the reunified Federal Republic of Germany)	Corazon Aquino; Fidel V. Ramos	
Francisco V. Del Rosario	1994 – 1996	Richard von Weizsäcker; Roman Herzog	Helmut Kohl (later as Chancellor of the reunified Federal Republic of Germany)	Fidel V. Ramos; Joseph Estrada	
Romeo A. Arguelles	1996 – 1999	Roman Herzog; Johannes Rau	Helmut Kohl; Gerhard Schröder	Fidel V. Ramos; Joseph Estrada	
Jose Abeto Zaide	1999 – 2003	Roman Herzog; Johannes Rau	Gerhard Schröder	Joseph Estrada; Gloria Macapagal Arroyo	First resident ambassador to reside in Berlin, after the embassy was moved there from Bonn.
Minerva Jean A. Falcon	2004 – 2005	Johannes Rau; Horst Köhler	Gerhard Schröder; Angela Merkel	Gloria Macapagal Arroyo; Benigno Aquino III	
Delia D. Albert	2005 – 2010	Horst Köhler; Jens Böhrnsen (acting); Christian Wulff	Angela Merkel	Gloria Macapagal Arroyo; Benigno Aquino III	
Maria Cleofe Natividad	2011 – 2014	Christian Wulff; Horst Seehofer (acting); Joachim Gauck	Angela Merkel	Benigno Aquino III; Rodrigo Duterte	
Melita S. Sta. Maria-Thomeczek	2015 – 2018	Joachim Gauck; Frank-Walter Steinmeier	Angela Merkel	Benigno Aquino III; Rodrigo Duterte	Appointed to the position on 6 June 2014 by Pres. Benigno Aquino III, and then confirmed by the Commission on Appointments less than a month later. Credentials were presented on 4 March 2015.
Ma. Theresa Dizon-De Vega	2019 – 2021	Frank-Walter Steinmeier	Angela Merkel; Olaf Scholz	Rodrigo Duterte	Credentials were presented on 12 June 2019.
Irene Susan B. Natividad	2022 – 2025	Frank-Walter Steinmeier	Olaf Scholz; Friedrich Merz	Bongbong Marcos	Appointed to the position on 22 November 2022 by Pres. Bongbong Marcos, and then confirmed by the Commission on Appointments less than a month later. Credentials were presented on 16 May 2023.
Maria Teresa T. Almojuela	2026 – present	Frank-Walter Steinmeier	Friedrich Merz	Bongbong Marcos	Appointed to the position on 2 June 2025 by Pres. Bongbong Marcos, and then confirmed by the Commission on Appointments two days later. Credentials were presented on 6 March 2026.
Source: Embassy of the Republic of the Philippines, Berlin

== See also ==
- List of ambassadors of Germany to the Philippines
