= LGBTQ rights in Chad =

- Chad
- Legal status: Illegal since 2017
- Penalty: 3 months to 2 years imprisonment, with fines of 50,000 to 500,000 FCFA. (Penal Code, Chapter 2, Article 354)
- Gender identity: No
- Military: No
- Discrimination protections: No

Family rights
- Recognition of relationships: No
- Adoption: No

Lesbian, gay, bisexual, transgender, and queer (LGBTQ) people in Chad face legal challenges not experienced by non-LGBTQ residents. Both male and female forms of same-sex sexual activity are illegal in the country. Before the new penal code took effect in August 2017, homosexual activity between adults had never been criminalized. There is no legal protection against discrimination based on sexual orientation and gender identity.

== Law regarding same-sex sexual activity ==
Same-sex sexual activity is illegal in Chad since 2017. Previous to that there were no restrictions. A bill introduced in 2014 aimed to impose up to 20 years imprisonment for consensual same-sex acts (proposed Article 361bis). However, on 12 December 2016, the National Assembly passed an updated penal code criminalizing both male and female same-sex sexual activity by a vote of 111 to 1 (with 4 abstentions), but classing acts between consenting adults as a misdemeanor offence. On 8 May 2017, the new penal code was enacted by the President Idriss Deby.

In supporting the law, the former Prime Minister Delwa Kassiré Coumakoye argued a religious motivation: "Homosexuality is condemned by all religions. We do not have to forgive something that God himself rejects because Westerners have said this or that." His comment was criticized by some LGBTQ historians who controversially maintain that homophobia was brought to Chad by colonialism, despite the existence of Islamic law in the nation prior to imperial rule. These historians believe that homosexuality was quite commonplace and accepted before the arrival of the Europeans. The US-based Robert F. Kennedy Human Rights called on the President of Chad not to enact the changes to the law, which is linked to a rise in homophobia in Africa in response to the increased visibility and assertiveness of gay lifestyles and politics in Africa, and the engagement of fundamentalist Christians. This includes the financing of anti-gay campaigns by American evangelical churches.

It became law on 1 August 2017.

Chapter II on "Other offenses against decency" of Title VII (relating to sexual offences) of the Penal Code, provides as follows:

Article 354. Everyone who has sex with persons of the same sex is liable to imprisonment for three months to two years and a fine of between 50,000 and 500,000 [CFA] francs [equivalent to about 89 to 885 USD].

Chapter III on "Offenses of a sexual nature committed against minors" of Title VIII (relating to offenses against the person or the status of the child) of the Penal Code, provides as follows:

Article 360. Anyone who, without violence, maintains a sexual relationship or practices sexual touching on a person of the same sex aged less than eighteen (18) years will be punished with imprisonment of one (1) to three (3) years and a fine of 100,000 to 500,000 francs [equivalent to about 177 to 885 USD].

== Discrimination protections ==
Article 350(i) of the Penal Code provides imprisonment of ten to twenty years if rape is committed because of the sexual orientation of the victim.

== Recognition of LGBTQ+ relationships and families ==
There is no legal recognition of same-sex couples in Chad. Because of the lack of legal recognition, same-sex couples cannot adopt children together. Single people are allowed to adopt; however, this requires an investigation by social services, including an investigation into one's moral standing. This can be used as grounds to deny adoption. There is no legal gender recognition.

== Living conditions ==
Even before criminalization under the 2017 law, LGBTQ+ people in Chad did not feel safe to live openly. There were no LGBTQ+ organizations prior to criminalization. The U.S. State Department's 2010 report says, "there were few reports of violence or discrimination against LGBT persons, in large part because most such persons were discreet about sexual orientation due to social and cultural strictures against homosexuality."

In 2013, two gay men were arrested in Abéché for celebrating their wedding. Though this was before the Penal Code formally outlawed homosexuality, the bar was ordered to close for two years. Both men were fined and each was given a two-year prison sentence. There was community outcry when they received a suspended prison sentence upon appeal. This led to religious groups, women's groups, and youth associations petitioning the government to punish the men.

According to the U.S. State Department's 2023 report, LGBTQ+ Chadians continue to hide their sexual orientation or gender identity to protect their rights and safety. The report says, "those who did [live as openly LGBTQ+] faced verbal and physical aggression and abuse." Due to the criminalization of homosexuality, authorities refuse to investigate or prosecute crimes committed against LGBTQ+ people. While data is sparse, local civil society members say that dozens of LGBTQ+ people are imprisoned under the pretext of different charges. LGBTQ+ people are often denied voter registration from local authorities despite the country's constition granting universal suffrage. LGBTQ+ Chadians have difficulty obtaining housing, employment, and government services due to discrimination.

Many of LGBTQ+ people's rights and freedoms are de facto restricted. There are no laws restricting LGBTQ+ people's freedom of expression, association, or peaceful assembly; however, discrimination and marginalization effectively limit these rights. Although not formally restricted, men who have sex with men (MSM) are unlikely to be able to donate blood due to discrimination and hostility when accessing healthcare.

LGBTQ+ people are societally viewed as threats to family, procreation, and marriage in Chad. Homosexuality is perceived as an invention of Western culture. Chadian activists say that social and familial pressure have been used in attempts to coerce LGBTQ+ into changing their sexual orientation, gender identity, or gender expression. In a 2024 survey, 15 percent of Chadians felt their local area would be a good place for gay and lesbian people to live.

== Summary table ==
Same-sex sexual activity legal	No (Since 2017) Up to 3 years in prison with fines
Equal age of consent	No
Anti-discrimination laws in hate speech and violence	Yes / No (Law against raping someone because of their sexual orientation)
Anti-discrimination laws in employment	No
Anti-discrimination laws in the provision of goods and services	No
Same-sex marriage	No
Recognition of same-sex couples	No
Step-child adoption by same-sex couples	No
Joint adoption by same-sex couples	No
Gays and lesbians allowed to serve openly in the military	No
Right to change legal gender	No
Access to IVF for lesbians	No
Commercial surrogacy for gay male couples	No
MSMs allowed to donate blood	No

== See also ==
- Human rights in Chad
- LGBTQ rights in Africa
- LGBTQ rights by country or territory
