= Human rights in Chad =

Human rights in Chad have been described as "poor"; for example, since 1972, Freedom House has designated the country as "Not Free." Chad received a score of 7 for political rights and 6 for civil liberties (with 1 being the most free, 7 being the least free).

According to the U.S. State Department's country report on Chad in 2006, "The government's poor human rights record deteriorated further during the year; security forces committed numerous serious human rights abuses." Among the abuses listed were extrajudicial killings, beatings, torture, and rape by security forces; limits on freedom of speech and the press and freedom of assembly; arbitrary arrest and detention; and widespread corruption. Security forces commit these and other abuses with "near total" impunity.

In their annual report from 2007, Amnesty International noted sexual violence against women resulting from incursions by the Sudanese militia group Janjawid, stating that "the widespread insecurity in eastern Chad had particularly severe consequences for women, who suffered grave human rights abuses, including rape, during attacks on villages." Female genital mutilation, while technically illegal, is still widely practiced. Harassment of journalists and human rights activists has also been documented, as well as the use of child soldiers by Chadian security forces, by various human rights groups.

Transparency International has ranked Chad as one of the most corrupt nations in the world. In 2007, it scored 1.8 out of 10 on the Corruption Perceptions Index (with 10 being the least corrupt). Only Tonga, Uzbekistan, Haiti, Iraq, Myanmar, and Somalia scored lower. Critics of former President Idriss Déby accused him of cronyism and favoring his own tribe, the Zaghawa. Déby's re-election in May 2006—in which he won a third term—was boycotted by the opposition, who denounced the results as fraudulent. The previous election, in 2001, was similarly viewed as fraudulent by the opposition parties, although a team of foreign observers said that polling had taken place "without major problems or intimidation".

== Historical situation ==
The following chart shows Chad's ratings since 1972 in the Freedom in the World reports, published annually by Freedom House. A rating of 1 is "most free" and 7 is "least free".^{1}

Historical ratings

Year	Political Rights	Civil Liberties	Status	President^{2}
1972	6	7	Not Free	N’Garta Tombalbaye
1973	6	7	Not Free	N'Garta Tombalbaye
1974	6	7	Not Free	N'Garta Tombalbaye
1975	7	6	Not Free	N'Garta Tombalbaye
1976	7	6	Not Free	Félix Malloum N'Gakoutou
1977	7	6	Not Free	Félix Malloum N'Gakoutou
1978	6	6	Not Free	Félix Malloum N'Gakoutou
1979	6	6	Not Free	Félix Malloum N'Gakoutou
1980	7	6	Not Free	Goukouni Oueddei
1981	7	6	Not Free	Goukouni Oueddei
1982^{3}	7	6	Not Free	Goukouni Oueddei
1983	7	6	Not Free	Hissène Habré
1984	7	7	Not Free	Hissène Habré
1985	7	7	Not Free	Hissène Habré
1986	7	7	Not Free	Hissène Habré
1987	6	7	Not Free	Hissène Habré
1988	6	7	Not Free	Hissène Habré
1989	7	6	Not Free	Hissène Habré
1990	7	6	Not Free	Hissène Habré
1991	6	6	Not Free	Idriss Déby
1992	6	6	Not Free	Idriss Déby
1993	6	5	Not Free	Idriss Déby
1994	6	5	Not Free	Idriss Déby
1995	6	5	Not Free	Idriss Déby
1996	6	5	Not Free	Idriss Déby
1997	6	5	Not Free	Idriss Déby
1998	6	4	Not Free	Idriss Déby
1999	6	5	Not Free	Idriss Déby
2000	6	5	Not Free	Idriss Déby
2001	6	5	Not Free	Idriss Déby
2002	6	5	Not Free	Idriss Déby
2003	6	5	Not Free	Idriss Déby
2004	6	5	Not Free	Idriss Déby
2005	6	5	Not Free	Idriss Déby
2006	6	6	Not Free	Idriss Déby
2007	7	6	Not Free	Idriss Déby
2008	7	6	Not Free	Idriss Déby
2009	7	6	Not Free	Idriss Déby
2010	7	6	Not Free	Idriss Déby
2011	7	6	Not Free	Idriss Déby
2012	7	6	Not Free	Idriss Déby
2013	7	6	Not Free	Idriss Déby
2014	7	6	Not Free	Idriss Déby
2015	7	6	Not Free	Idriss Déby
2016	7	6	Not Free	Idriss Déby
2017	7	6	Not Free	Idriss Déby
2018	7	6	Not Free	Idriss Déby
2019	7	6	Not Free	Idriss Déby
2020	7	6	Not Free	Idriss Déby
2021	7	6	Not Free	Idriss Déby
2022	7	6	Not Free	Mahamat Déby
2023	7	6	Not Free	Mahamat Déby

== International treaties ==
Chad's stances on international human rights treaties are as follows:

International treaties
Treaty	Organization	Introduced	Signed	Ratified
Convention on the Prevention and Punishment of the Crime of Genocide	United Nations	1948	—	—
International Convention on the Elimination of All Forms of Racial Discrimination	United Nations	1966	—	1977
International Covenant on Economic, Social and Cultural Rights	United Nations	1966	—	1995
International Covenant on Civil and Political Rights	United Nations	1966	—	1995
First Optional Protocol to the International Covenant on Civil and Political Rights	United Nations	1966	—	1995
Convention on the Non-Applicability of Statutory Limitations to War Crimes and Crimes Against Humanity	United Nations	1968	—	—
International Convention on the Suppression and Punishment of the Crime of Apartheid	United Nations	1973	1974	1974
Convention on the Elimination of All Forms of Discrimination against Women	United Nations	1979		1995
Convention against Torture and Other Cruel, Inhuman or Degrading Treatment or Punishment	United Nations	1984	—	1995
Convention on the Rights of the Child	United Nations	1989	1990	1990
Second Optional Protocol to the International Covenant on Civil and Political Rights, aiming at the abolition of the death penalty	United Nations	1989	—	—
International Convention on the Protection of the Rights of All Migrant Workers and Members of Their Families	United Nations	1990	—	—
Optional Protocol to the Convention on the Elimination of All Forms of Discrimination against Women	United Nations	1999	—	—
Optional Protocol to the Convention on the Rights of the Child on the Involvement of Children in Armed Conflict	United Nations	2000	2002	2002
Optional Protocol to the Convention on the Rights of the Child on the Sale of Children, Child Prostitution and Child Pornography	United Nations	2000	2002	2002
Convention on the Rights of Persons with Disabilities	United Nations	2006	—	—
Optional Protocol to the Convention on the Rights of Persons with Disabilities	United Nations	2006	—	—
International Convention for the Protection of All Persons from Enforced Disappearance	United Nations	2006	2007	—
Optional Protocol to the International Covenant on Economic, Social and Cultural Rights	United Nations	2008	—	—
Optional Protocol to the Convention on the Rights of the Child on a Communications Procedure	United Nations	2011	—	—

== See also ==
- Freedom of religion in Chad
- Human trafficking in Chad
- Internet censorship and surveillance in Chad
- LGBT rights in Chad
- Politics of Chad

== Notes ==
1.Note that the "Year" signifies the "Year covered". Therefore, the information for the year marked 2008 is from the report published in 2009, and so on.
2.As of January 1.
3.The 1982 report covers the year 1981 and the first half of 1982, and the following 1984 report covers the second half of 1982 and the whole of 1983. In the interest of simplicity, these two aberrant "year and a half" reports have been split into three year-long reports through interpolation.
