= Mariam Ali Moussa =

Chadian diplomat

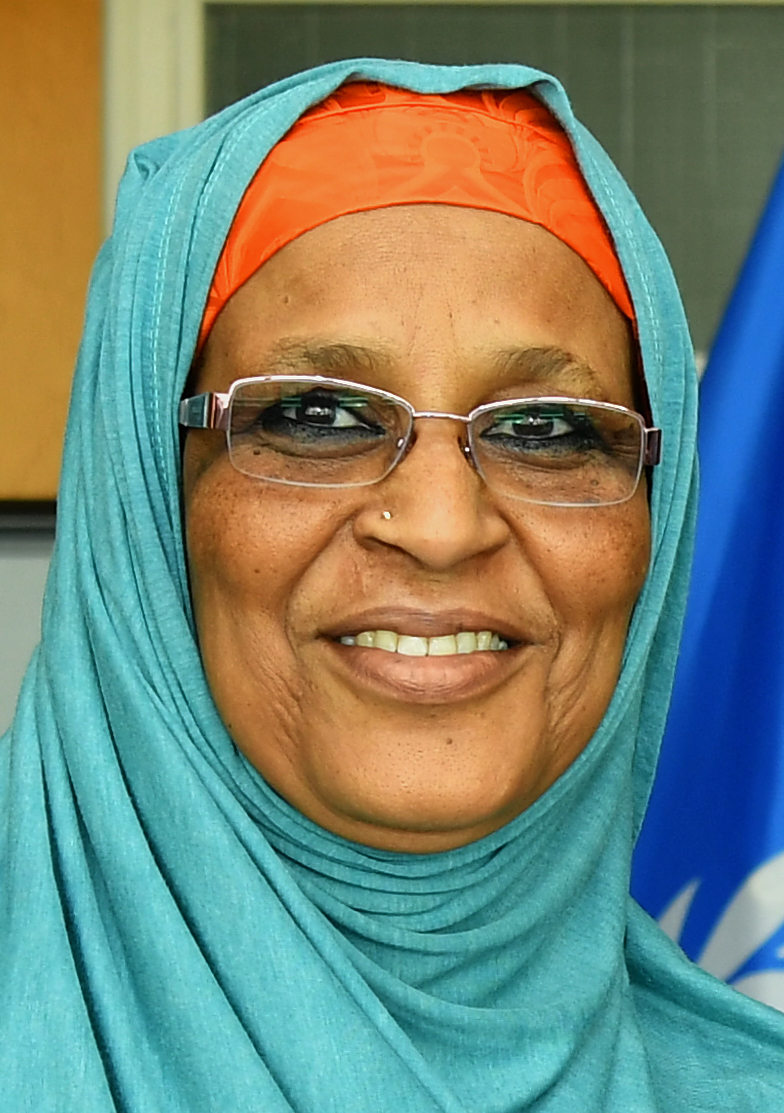
- Occupation: Diplomat
- Known for: Ambassador to Germany and Austria

Mariam Ali Moussa is a Chadian diplomat. She has been her country's ambassador to Germany. Previously she was an adviser to the President and a minister.

== Life ==
Moussa has studied Business Administration and she speaks Arabic, French and English in addition to Gourane, Kanembou and Gambaye.

One of Moussa's first jobs was as a customs inspector at N'Djamena International Airport in 1988. In 1989, she moved into teaching and in 1991, she was a research assistant at the Canadian University of Moncton and two years later an Economist Assistant for a USAID related project concerned with Agriculture Marketing and Technology Transfer. In 1997, Moussa became the finance lead for the Agence Tchadienne d’exécution des Travaux d’Intérêt Public when Youssouf Saleh Abbas was in charge.

In 1998, Moussa joined the office of the Prime Minister as an Advisor on Economic and Financial Affairs. In 2003, she was the President's Counsellor on Budget Affairs. The following year, she became Deputy General Secretary to the President. In 2005, Moussa became a minister whose portfolio was "General Control and Moralization". In 2005/6, she was Deputy General Secretary Minister of Government and again in 2006 she was Minister of National Solidarity and Micro credit.

Moussa was accredited as Chad's Ambassador to Germany in December 2018, with accreditation to Austria and Liechtenstein. This is an important link as France, Germany and latterly the European Union are the only European embassies in Chad.

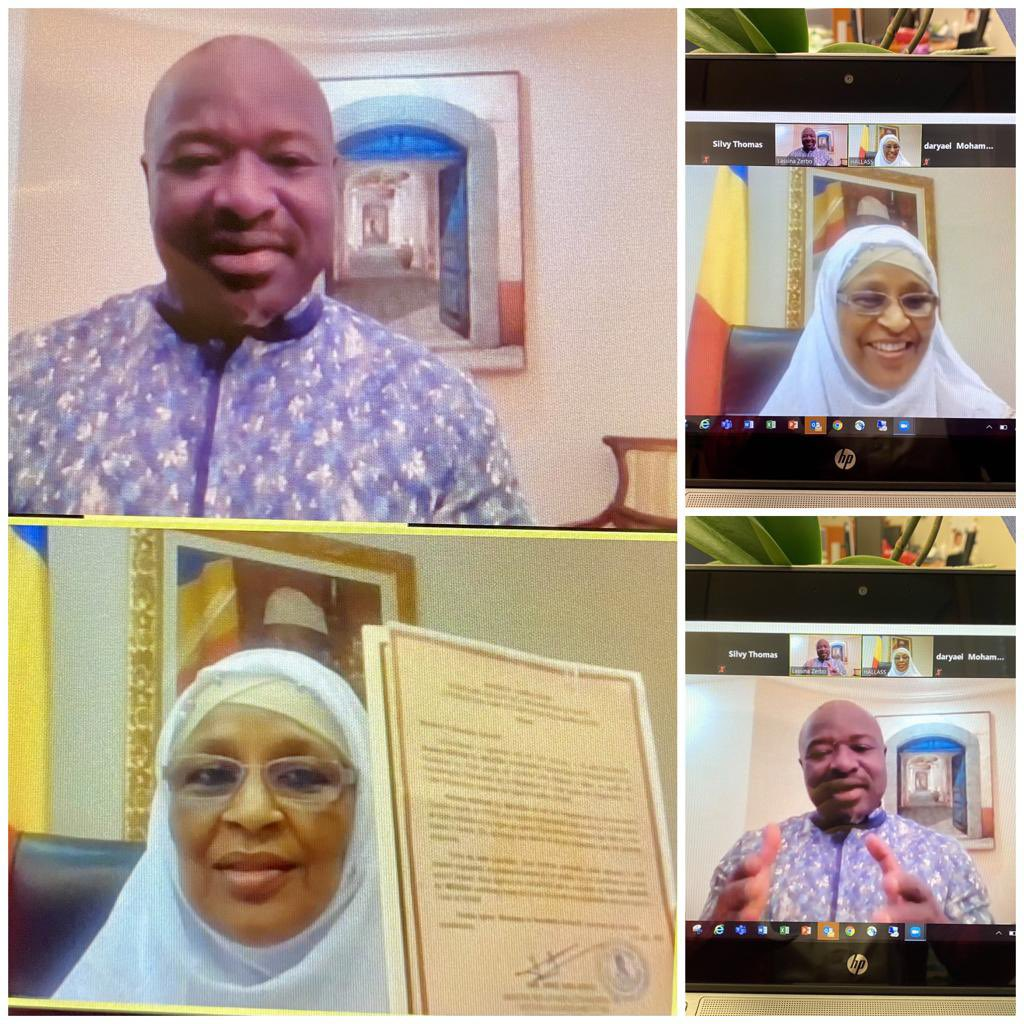
Virtual Presentation of Credentials by Chad in 2021 to Lassina Zerbo

In 2019, Moussa was accepted as Chad's representative by Juan Carlos Lentijo at the International Atomic Energy Agency in Vienna.

In February 2020, Moussa presented her credentials as the Ambassador to Austria to Austrian Federal President Alexander Van der Bellen in Hofburg. In 2021, Lassina Zerbo of the Comprehensive Nuclear-Test-Ban Treaty Organization recognised her as Chad's representative (this was done virtually because of the COVID-19 pandemic.)

Germany expelled Moussa on 11 April 2023 in retaliation for Chad expelling the German ambassador, Gordon Kricke, a few days earlier.
