= Freedom of religion in Chad =

The Transitional Charter of October 2022 established Chad as a secular state and affirmed the separation of religion and state; it also provided for freedom of religion.

In 2026, the country was scored 1 out of 4 for religious freedom.

== Religious demography ==
The country has an area of 496,000 square miles (1,280,000 km^{2}) and a population of 18,278,568 according to the UN estimate for 2023.

According to estimates in 2014–15, 52.1% of the population is Muslim (mainly Sufi Tijaniyah), 23.9% is Protestant, 20% is Roman Catholic, 0.3% is animist, 0.2% are 'other Christian', 2.8% have no religion, and 0.7% did not specify what their beliefs were.

The vast majority of Muslims are adherents of a moderate branch of Sufism known locally as Tijaniyah, which incorporates some local African religious elements. A small minority of Muslims (5 to 10 percent) hold more fundamentalist beliefs, which in some cases may be associated with Saudi-oriented belief systems such as Wahhabism or Salafism.

Roman Catholics represent the largest Christian denomination in the country. Most Protestants, including the Nigeria-based "Winners Chapel", are affiliated with various evangelical Christian groups. Members of the Baháʼí and Jehovah's Witnesses religious communities also are present. Both religious groups were introduced after independence in 1960 and therefore are considered "new" religious groups.

== Status of religious freedom ==
=== Legal and policy framework ===
Article 1 of the Chad Constitution declared that the country is a secular state and "affirm[s] the separation of the religions and of the State".

The Office of the Director of Religious and Traditional Affairs under the Ministry of the Interior and Public Security oversees religious matters. The office is responsible for mediating intercommunal conflict, reporting on religious practices, and ensuring religious freedom, as well as organizing the Haij.

All associations (religious and non-religious0, must register with the Ministry of Territorial Administration and Decentralized Territorial Collectivities. The Transitional Charter states that public education shall be secular; religious instruction can be given in public schools and many Muslim and Christian groups run their own schools.

The High Council for Islamic Affairs is an independent government body which oversees Islamic religious activities. The government approves membership of the council's board. The Grand Imam of N’Djamena is the de jure president of the HCIA and oversees the heads of the HCIA branches and grand imams from each of the country's 23 provinces. The HCIA has jurisdiction for some legal issues, including marriage, property dispositions between spouses, divorce, and parentage.

==== Status in the early 2000s ====
While the Government is legally obligated to treat all religious groups or denominations equally, non-Muslims allege that Muslims receive preferential status. In the past the Government reportedly accorded public lands to Muslim leaders for the purpose of building mosques but required representatives of other religious groups to purchase land at market rates to build places of worship.

In the past, religious leaders are also involved in managing the country's wealth. A representative of the religious community sits on the Revenue Management College, the body that oversees the allocation of oil revenues. The seat rotates between Muslim and Christian leaders every 4 years. In 2004 the Muslim representative handed responsibilities over to a Catholic priest designated by the Christian community. The mandate of the Christian representative at the college ended in June 2007.

The Government prohibits activity that "does not create conditions of cohabitation among the populations". This prohibition is understood to mean regulating groups who advocate sectarian tensions in the country. The Al Mountada al Islami and the World Association for Muslim Youth organizations were banned by the government for portraying violence as a legitimate precept of Islam.

Generally, foreign missionaries did not face restrictions; however, they must register and receive authorization from the Ministry of Interior to circulate within the country, as do other foreigners traveling and operating throughout the country. It is difficult to find a report that the Government withheld authorization from any group.

Public schools conduct instruction in French, and public bilingual schools conduct classes in French and Arabic. The Government prohibits religious instruction in public schools but permits all religious groups to operate private schools without restriction. The poor quality of Chad's educational system has prompted many Muslim families to look to Islamic schools as an opportunity for educating children who would otherwise have little or no access to formal schooling. Most large towns have at least one or two private religious schools. Although the Government does not publish official records on school funding, many Islamic schools were commonly understood to be financed by Arab donors (governments, nongovernmental organizations (NGOs), and individuals), particularly from Saudi Arabia, Egypt, and Libya.

In the past several human rights organizations have reported on the problem of the mahadjirin children, students of certain Islamic schools who are forced by their teachers to beg for food and money. There were no credible estimates as to the number of mahadjirin children. The High Council for Islamic Affairs appealed for an immediate end to such practices, and the Government called for the closure of such schools. Despite attempted reforms, the schools remained open.

Among the numerous private radio stations, religious organizations own several stations broadcasting throughout the country (six Christian and two Islamic). Officials closely monitored radio stations run by both nonprofit and commercial groups.

The Government celebrates both Christian and Islamic holy days as national holidays. Islamic national holidays include Eid al-Adha, the Birth of the Prophet Muhammad, and Eid al-Fitr. Christian holidays include Easter Monday, All Saints' Day, and Christmas Day. It is not uncommon for Muslims and Christians to attend each other's festivities during these holidays.

While most interfaith dialogue takes place on a voluntary basis and not through government intervention, the Government was generally supportive of these initiatives. On March 8, 2007, the Government initiated a campaign for peace, and Christian organizations organized a peaceful march to support the initiative. The Muslim religious establishment also attended, specifically the Imam of the grand mosque on behalf of the High Council of Islamic Affairs.

=== Restrictions on religious freedom ===
Burqas and niqabs are forbidden by ministerial decree.

The leading Wahhabi group, Ansar al-Sunna, is banned from participating in the HCIA, although they are able to worship.

Groups who do not register with the government are not allowed to set up bank accounts and may face being banned; group founders and board members can face up to one year in prison and a fine of 50,000 to 500,000 CFA francs.

== Societal abuses and discrimination ==
In April 2007 the Association of Evangelical Churches appealed to the Government for additional assistance in ending the conflict between nomadic herders (who are primarily Muslim) and local farmers (who are primarily Christian) in the southern part of the country; however, the Government did not respond to the appeal. In 2022, tensions continue over land use, as many people associate herders with Islam and farmers with Christianity.

In January 2007 the Catholic Church and Association of Evangelical Churches sent a second official protest to the Government for its failure to respond to a February 2006 rally against the Danish cartoons that resulted in damage to several Christian properties and injury to an evangelical missionary. The Government did not officially respond to the complaint.

There are rarely reports of tension between Christians and Muslims in reaction to proselytizing of traditional believers by evangelical Christians.

== See also ==
- Human rights in Chad
- Religion in Chad
