= Human trafficking in Chad =

Chad ratified the 2000 UN TIP (Trafficking in Person) Protocol in August 2009.

In 2010 Chad was a source and destination country for children subjected to trafficking in persons, specifically conditions of forced labor and forced prostitution. The country's trafficking problem was primarily internal and frequently involved parents entrusting children to relatives or intermediaries in return for promises of education, apprenticeship, goods, or money; selling or bartering children into involuntary domestic servitude or herding was used as a means of survival by families seeking to reduce the number of mouths to feed. Child trafficking victims were primarily subjected to forced labor as herders, domestic servants, agricultural laborers, or beggars. Child cattle herders followed traditional routes for grazing cattle and at times cross ill-defined international borders into Cameroon, the Central African Republic (CAR), and Nigeria. Underage Chadian girls travelled to larger towns in search of work, where some were subsequently subjected to prostitution. Some girls were compelled to marry against their will, only to be forced by their husbands into involuntary domestic servitude or agricultural labor. In past reporting periods, traffickers transported children from Cameroon and the CAR to Chad's oil producing regions for commercial sexual exploitation; it was unknown whether this practice persisted in 2009.

During 2010, the Government of Chad actively engaged in fighting with anti-government armed opposition groups. Each side unlawfully conscripted, including from refugee camps, and used children as combatants, guards, cooks, and look-outs. The government's conscription of children for military service, however, decreased by the end of the reporting period, and a government-led, UNICEF-coordinated process to identify and demobilize remaining child soldiers in military installations and rebel camps began in mid-2009. A significant, but unknown, number of children remain within the ranks of the Chadian National Army (ANT). Sudanese children in refugee camps in eastern Chad were forcibly recruited by Sudanese rebel groups, some of which were backed by the Chadian government during the reporting period.

In 2010 the government did not fully comply with the minimum standards for the elimination of trafficking; however, it made significant efforts to do so. During the reporting period, the government took steps to investigate and address the problem of forced child labor in animal herding. It also initiated efforts to raise awareness about the illegality of conscripting child soldiers, to identify and remove children from the ranks of its national army, and to demobilize children captured from rebel groups. The government failed, however, to enact legislation prohibiting trafficking in persons and undertook minimal anti-trafficking law enforcement efforts and victim protection activities. The country faces severe constraints including lack of a strong judicial system, destabilizing civil conflicts, and a heavy influx of refugees from neighboring states.

The U.S. State Department's Office to Monitor and Combat Trafficking in Persons placed the country in "Tier 2 Watchlist" in 2017. The country was placed at Tier 3 in 2023.

In 2023, the Organised Crime Index gave the country a score of 7 out of 10 for human trafficking, noting that this was most prevalent along the border.

== History ==
The practice of slavery in Chad, as in the Sahel states in general, is an entrenched phenomenon with a long history, going back to the trans-Saharan slave trade, in the Sahelian kingdoms, and it continues today. As elsewhere in West Africa, the situation reflects an ethnic, racial and religious rift between black, Christian farmers and lighter-skinned, Muslim herdsmen, occasionally flaring up in eruptions of violence or civil unrest.

In the early 1890s, French military expeditions sent to Chad encountered the forces of Rabih az-Zubayr, who had been conducting slave raids (razzias) in southern Chad throughout the 1890s and had sacked the settlements of Bornu, Baguirmi, and Ouaddai. After years of indecisive engagements, French forces finally defeated Rabih az-Zubayr at the battle of Kousséri in 1900.

The colonial authorities of French Chad officially suppressed slavery, but their de facto control over the region was limited. In the huge Borkou-Ennedi-Tibesti Region, the handful of French military administrators soon reached a tacit agreement with the inhabitants of the desert; as long as caravan trails remained relatively secure and minimal levels of law and order were met, the military administration (headquartered in Faya Largeau) usually left the people alone.

In central Chad, French rule was only slightly more substantive. Slave raids continued in the 1920s, and it was reported in 1923 that a group of Senegalese Muslims on their way to Mecca had been seized and sold into slavery. Unwilling to expend the resources required for effective administration, the French government responded with sporadic coercion and a growing reliance on indirect rule through the sultanates.

Today, in the Republic of Chad, slavery persists, but it does not have the same ubiquity as in the western Sahel, e.g. in Mauritania where up to 20% of total population are estimated as living in slavery. Instead, contemporary slavery in Chad is mostly limited to child labour, and not to hereditary servitude.

== Child slavery ==
Child slaves, sold by their impoverished parents, are mostly held by Arab-Berber herdsmen. These often impose a new identity on them,

"The Arab herdsman change their name, forbid them to speak in their native dialect, ban them from conversing with people from their own ethnic group and make them adopt Islam as their religion."

== Prosecution (2010) ==
Chad's weak judicial system impeded its progress in undertaking anti-trafficking law enforcement efforts. The government failed to prosecute trafficking offenses and convict and punish trafficking offenders during the year. Existing laws do not specifically address human trafficking, though forced prostitution and many types of labor exploitation are prohibited.

Title 5 of the Labor Code prohibits forced and bonded labor, prescribing fines of $100 to $1,000; these penalties, which are considered significant by Chadian standards, fail to prescribe a penalty of imprisonment and are not sufficiently stringent to deter trafficking crimes. Penal Code Articles 279 and 280 prohibit the prostitution of children, prescribing punishments of 5 to 10 years' imprisonment and fines up to $2,000 – penalties that are sufficiently stringent, but not commensurate with penalties prescribed for other serious crimes, such as rape. Pimping and owning brothels are also prohibited under Penal Code Articles 281 and 282. The 1991 Chadian National Army Law prohibits the Army's recruitment of individuals below the age of 18.

In 2009, the Ministry of Justice, with support from UNICEF, completed drafting revisions to the penal code; several new provisions will prohibit and prescribe punishments for child trafficking and provide protection for victims. The revisions are pending approval by the Supreme Court and the secretary general of the government. The government did not make anti-trafficking law enforcement statistics available, and there is no evidence to suggest the government prosecuted trafficking offenses during the reporting period. It did not provide information on the status of pending cases reported in the previous reporting period. In past reporting periods, the government prosecuted a small number of child trafficking cases using laws against kidnapping, the sale of children, and employing children under 14 years of age, though most magistrates lack understanding of how to apply existing laws to trafficking cases.

During the year, police detained an unknown number of Chadian adults suspected of using forced child labor for herding, as well as intermediaries arranging herding jobs for children, but released all suspects after they paid small fines. Some cases were dealt with by traditional forms of justice which varied depending on the religion, ethnicity, and clan affiliation of all parties involved in or affected by the exploitation. The government did not prosecute military officials for conscripting child soldiers, though it notified the ANT during the year that future infractions would be punished with the full weight of the law.

== Protection (2010) ==
The Government of Chad did not take adequate steps to ensure that all victims of trafficking received access to protective services during the reporting period. It did, however, make progress in providing protection for child soldiers, some of whom may have been forcibly conscripted, identified within the country. In a June 2009 ceremony, the ANT transferred to UNICEF for care 84 child combatants captured from Chadian rebel groups in early May. In July 2009, representatives of the Ministries of Social Affairs, Defense, and Foreign Affairs led an inter-ministerial mission to the military camp in Moussoro, accompanied by staff from UNICEF and an international NGO, to identify child soldiers captured from rebel units; of the 88 presumed child soldiers, the team identified 51 as children and succeeded in removing 16 of them to UNICEF's care.

By the end of 2009, the government and UNICEF identified and transferred to NGO-run rehabilitation and vocational training centers one child soldier from Chadian military ranks and 239 from Chadian rebel groups. The Ministry of Social Action operated a transit center located in Moussouro to screen and provide shelter to demobilized children after they are first released from armed groups. After spending between two days and two weeks at the center, the government transferred the children to rehabilitation centers operated by international NGOs. During the year, the Ministries of Social Affairs and Defense began maintaining files on rehabilitated child soldiers and other child victims of trafficking.

The government provided few services for trafficking victims other than unlawfully conscripted child soldiers during the reporting period. In 2009, the government continued its efforts to provide minimal assistance to child trafficking victims through its six technical regional committees charged with addressing the worst forms of child labor. These committees - located in N'Djamena, Abeche, and southern towns, with representatives from the Ministries of Justice, Social Affairs and Family, Education, Public Works, Human Rights, and the Judicial Police - encouraged victims to file charges against and assist in the investigation and prosecution of their traffickers. They also referred cases of children forced to herd animals to the judiciary for action.

The government sustained a formal system for officials to refer victims to NGOs or international organizations for care; judiciary police or other local authorities are to notify the Ministry of Justice's Child Protection Department, UNICEF, and local NGOs when there is a potential case of child trafficking. The government provided no information, however, on the number of victims it referred to such organizations during the year. Officials did not report encouraging victims to file charges or assist in the investigation and prosecution of their traffickers. The government did not arrest or detain trafficking victims, or prosecute or otherwise penalize identified child victims for unlawful acts committed as a direct result of being trafficked. Due to weak state entities and a lack of capacity, the government did not allocate any resources for training its officials regarding the identification and treatment of trafficking victims during the reporting period.

== Prevention ==
The Chadian government made modest efforts to prevent human trafficking during the year. The government continued to conduct its trafficking efforts according to two internal documents that are annually reviewed and revised - the "Guide for the Protection of Child Victims of Trafficking", and the "Integrated Action Plan to Fight the Worst Forms of Child Labor, Exploitation, and Trafficking (2008-1010)" - developed by the National Committee to Fight Trafficking and the Directorate of Children in the Ministry of Justice, respectively. While neither plan was formally adopted or launched as originally intended, all relevant government entities follow the work plans outlined in each. The government focused its prevention activities principally on addressing child labor trafficking, as children are the largest group of trafficking victims in Chad.

Throughout 2009, an inter-ministerial team visited southern towns to investigate suspected cases of children forced to herd animals and provided a report with recommendations for future action to the Human Rights Ministry. During the year, the government, in partnership with UNICEF and UNFPA, launched several nationwide human rights campaigns that included sensitization for the population on the dangers of giving, renting, or selling one's children into animal herding; these campaigns involved public events, billboards, posters, and the distribution of informational materials. The government also drafted a plan to educate parents on the risks of selling their children; the plan awaits final approval from the Prime Minister and funding. In January 2010, the National School of Administration and Magistracy graduated its first class of 28 labor inspectors; they have not yet been deployed due to lack of funding.

The country's 25 existing inspectors and 59 assistance inspectors lacked the resources to fulfill their mandate and the Ministry of Labor provided no information on the number of child labor inspections carried out or the number of children, if any, removed or assisted as the result of such inspections. Beginning in August 2009, the Ministry of Foreign Affair's Military Coordinator led an awareness raising delegation composed of officers from the ANT, the Nomadic Guard, Directorate General of Security Services for National Institutions, and the Gendarmerie, along with civilian government officials and representatives of UNICEF, UNDP, the UN peacekeeping operation, and diplomatic missions, to the four headquarters locations of the government's armed forces in Abeche, N'Djamena, Moussoro, and Mongo. The Military Coordinator, a brigadier general, delivered a consistent message denouncing the use of child soldiers, outlining the government's intolerance of the practice, and stating that the government would investigate and prosecute anyone implicated in the use of child soldiers. The government made no effort to reduce the demand for commercial sex acts or forced labor during the reporting period. In July 2009, the government ratified the 2000 UN TIP Protocol.

The Chad government has increased its efforts to eradicate trafficking in human beings through various efforts. However, according to the US report, government officials are not adequately trained to combat trafficking. According to the report, children also often suffer from forced labour and are sold in markets.

== See also ==
- Human rights in Chad
- Slavery in Africa
- Slavery in modern Africa
