= Consulate General of the Philippines, Frankfurt =

Diplomatic mission of the Philippines in Frankfurt, Germany

Consulate General of the Philippines in Frankfurt Konsuladong Panlahat ng Pilipinas sa Frankfurt Generalkonsulat der Philippinen in Frankfurt

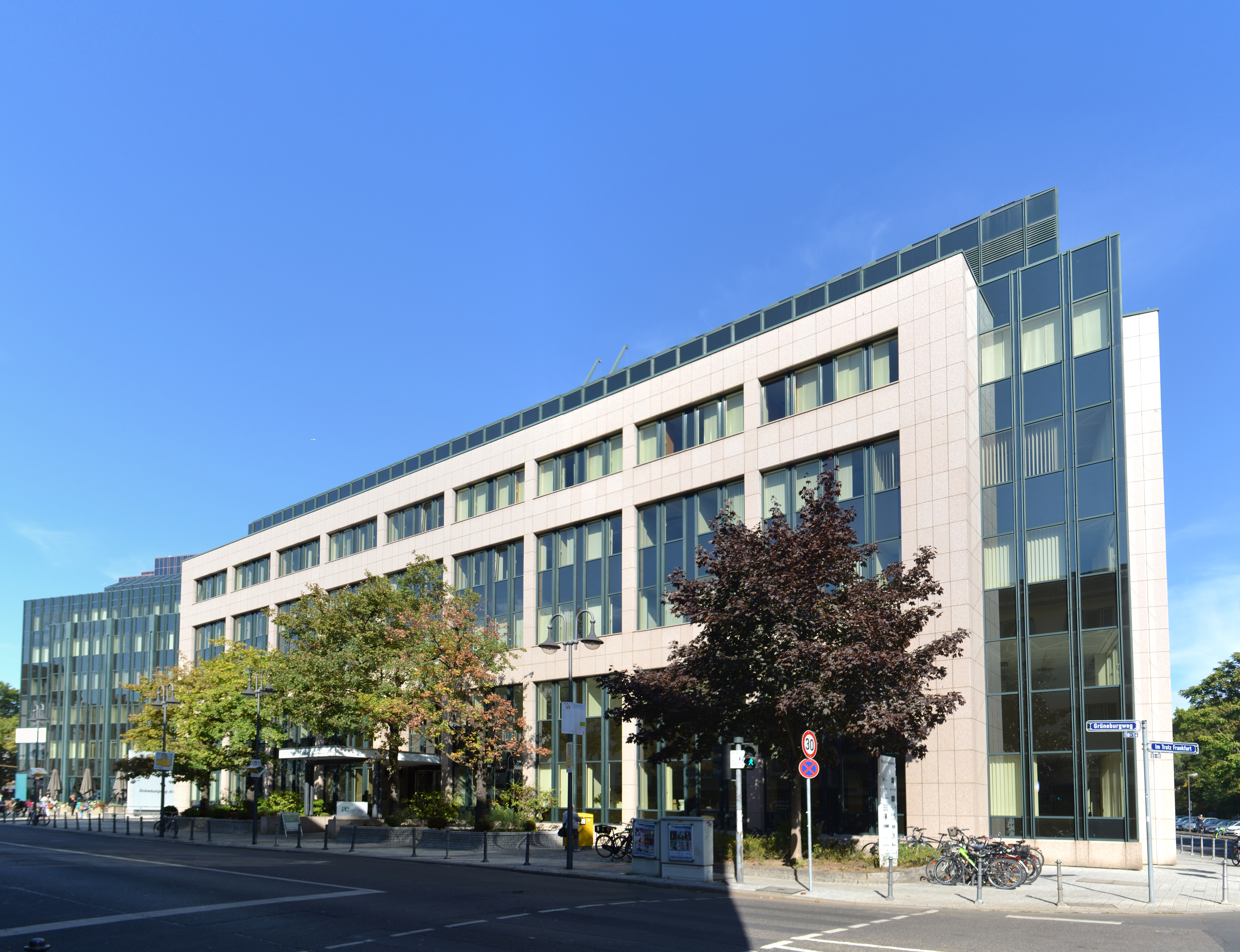
- Location: Frankfurt
- Address: Grüneburgweg 16-18
- Coordinates: 50°7′16.81″N 8°40′19.44″E
- Consul General: Marie Yvette L. Banzon-Abalos
- Website: frankfurtpcg.de

The Consulate General of the Philippines in Frankfurt is a diplomatic mission of the Republic of the Philippines in Germany, representing the country's interests in Hesse. It is located on the first floor of the Westend Carree complex along Grüneburgweg in the Westend-Nord district of Frankfurt, near the main campus of the Goethe University Frankfurt. Although the current consulate dates from 2019, the Philippines also maintained a previous consulate in Frankfurt between 2009 and 2012.

== History ==
The Philippine Consulate General in Frankfurt was first opened on March 4, 2009, taking over from a previous honorary consulate. Initially operating from offices along Friedrichstraße up the street from the present-day Consulate, and with career diplomat Romeo Manalo serving as its first Consul General, the mission replaced the Bonn extension office of the Philippine Embassy in Berlin. Manalo was subsequently succeeded by Raul M. Santiago Jr. as Consul General.

After a massive expansion of the Philippines' diplomatic presence abroad during the presidency of Gloria Macapagal Arroyo, in 2010 Senator Franklin Drilon questioned the need for embassies in countries with small Filipino communities, including a number of countries in Europe, and called for a review of the Philippines' diplomatic presence worldwide. This would lead to the closure of ten posts under Arroyo's successor, Benigno Aquino III, and ultimately to the closure of the Consulate on July 31, 2012. The closure was not without controversy: in March 2012, some 100 people held a 1-kilometer (0.62 mi) long march in cold weather to protest the Consulate's closure. Led by local resident Victoria "Vickie" Villar, protesters called on President Aquino to reconsider his position and downsize rather than close the mission entirely, especially as it would be too inconvenient for the Filipinos living in the Consulate's service area to go to Berlin, some 800 kilometers (500 mi) away, and with Villar herself instead demanding the closure of the Philippine Embassy in Lisbon. Villar also wrote to the Philippine Daily Inquirer to ask for the Consulate to remain open, and a petition was also organized alongside similar movements in other affected countries, with more than 2,000 signatures being collected from both Filipinos and Germans.

While the Consulate remained closed, relations were conducted through a service office of the honorary consulate in Stuttgart, headed by Gerhard Ziedler, honorary president of Dekra's board of directors, with Loredanna Hess serving as consul in Frankfurt. However, both were closed indefinitely on December 19, 2016 owing to Ziedler's retirement, with those needing consular services being advised to proceed directly to the Embassy. Both posts reopened the following year with the appointment of new honorary consuls.

By 2018 the Philippine government had begun considering reopening the Consulate, with Foreign Affairs Secretary Alan Peter Cayetano announcing that it would reopen as part of an expansion of the country's diplomatic presence under Aquino's successor, Rodrigo Duterte. The Consulate provisionally reopened in October 2018, and it fully reopened for consular services on January 15, 2019. Initially operating from another building within the Westend Carree complex on Gervinusstraße, it moved to its permanent location – an 800-square-meter (8,600 sq ft) space – on May 16, 2019.

== Staff and activities ==
The Philippine Consulate General in Frankfurt is headed by Consul General Marie Yvette L. Banzon-Abalos, who assumed the position in December 2021. Prior to becoming Consul General, Banzon-Abalos, a career diplomat, most recently served as the DFA's executive director for strategic communications, and prior to that served as Consul General at the Philippine Embassy in Oslo.

Currently, the Consulate's jurisdiction covers seven states in southern Germany, with some 15,000 Filipinos living within its service area. Since it reopened, it has participated in a number of activities to promote ties between the Philippines and Germany. Its efforts in promoting economic ties between the two countries include supporting the participation of Filipino businesses at local trade fairs, while promoting cultural ties by facilitating the creation of a Philippine studies program at the Ruhr University Bochum, showcasing Filipino art, and encouraging Filipinos living within its jurisdiction to be active in patronizing and supporting Filipino culture, especially in light of the COVID-19 pandemic and its impact on the arts.

== See also ==
- List of diplomatic missions of the Philippines
- List of diplomatic missions in Germany
