= Embassy of the Philippines, Berlin =

Diplomatic mission of the Philippines in Germany

Embassy of the Philippines, Berlin Pasuguan ng Pilipinas sa Berlin Botschaft der Philippinen in Berlin

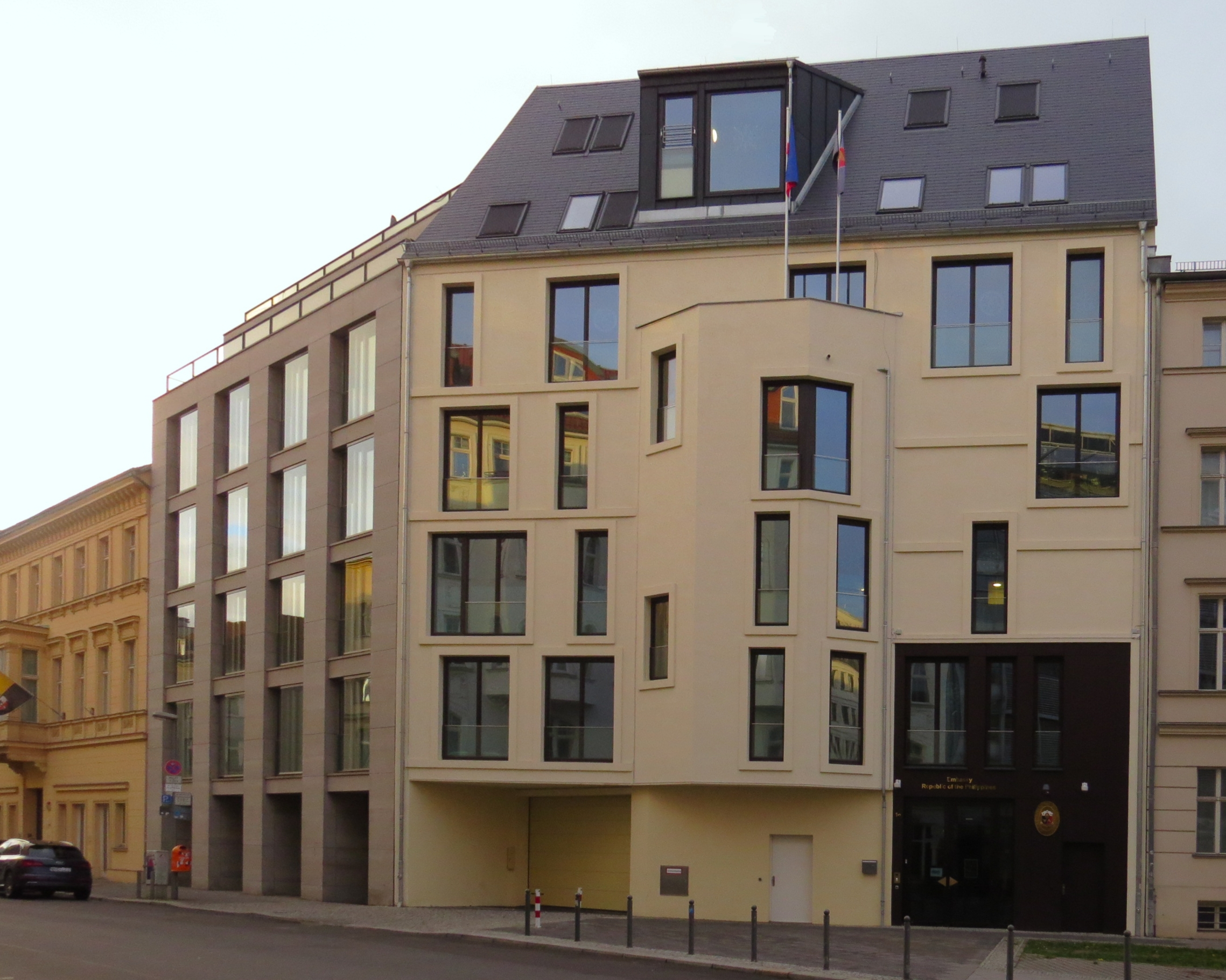
- Location: Berlin
- Address: Luisenstraße 16
- Coordinates: 52°31′20″N 13°22′46″E
- Ambassador: Maria Teresa T. Almojuela
- Website: philippine-embassy.de

The Embassy of the Philippines in Berlin is the diplomatic mission of the Republic of the Philippines to the Federal Republic of Germany. First opened in 1955 as the mission to West Germany, it is currently located in the Mitte locality of central Berlin, just beyond the periphery of the Reichstag complex and near the Charité.

In addition to the current embassy, the Philippines also maintained an embassy in East Germany, which opened in 1979 in East Berlin and closed after German reunification.

== History ==
Diplomatic relations between the Philippines and Germany were made possible with President Elpidio Quirino signing Proclamation No. 264 on July 9, 1951, which formally terminated the state of war that existed between the two countries as a result of World War II. Relations were initially conducted through the Philippine Embassy in London, with León María Guerrero III, at the time serving as Philippine Ambassador to the United Kingdom, being accredited as the first non-resident envoy to West Germany in 1952.

Formal diplomatic relations between the Philippines and West Germany were established on October 8, 1954, and after the two countries signed a trade agreement on April 25, 1955, a legation in Bonn was opened that year, with Jose D. Ingles becoming the mission's first resident envoy. Ingles was appointed by President Carlos P. Garcia as the legation's chief of mission on June 24, 1957, and on January 5, 1962, Garcia's successor, Diosdado Macapagal, elevated the legation to an embassy with his promotion to ambassador.

Relations between the Philippines and East Germany, on the other hand, were established on September 22, 1973, the first time the Philippines had established diplomatic relations with a member of the Eastern Bloc. An embassy was subsequently opened in East Berlin in 1979, located along a stretch of Otto-Grotewohl-Straße (now Wilhelmstraße) near the Brandenburg Gate and down the street from the present-day embassy, in a building shared with the embassies of several other countries. Meanwhile, in the run-up to the People Power Revolution in 1986, staff members of the embassy in Bonn voted to recognize the election of Corazon Aquino as President following the results of that year's presidential election.

After German reunification, which led to the closure of the embassy in East Berlin, the embassy remained in Bonn until 1999, when it was moved to Berlin during the ambassadorship of Jose A. Zaide, who became the first ambassador to reside in the city. The former embassy continued to serve as an extension office until it was closed in 2008 as part of a rationalization program and replaced the following year with the opening of the Philippine Consulate General in Frankfurt.

== Chancery ==
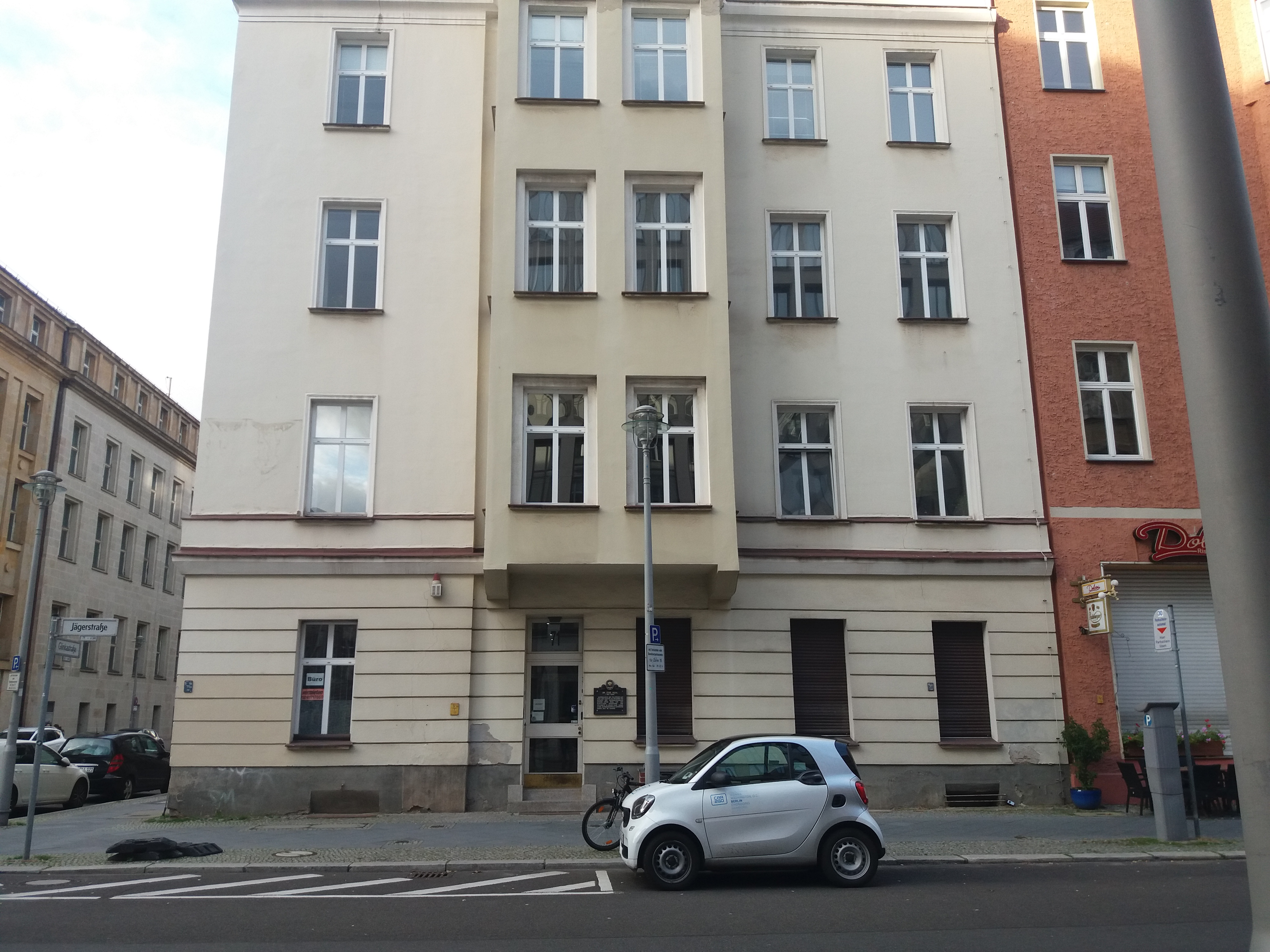
Jägerstraße 71, the building where José Rizal completed Noli Me Tángere, was the first building the Philippine government considered for the embassy's permanent chancery

The chancery of the Philippine Embassy in Berlin was first located along Uhlandstraße in Wilmersdorf, renting space in a building built over an 11-unit Gründerzeit-era residential building. That chancery, located on the building's sixth floor, had a 300 m^{2} (3,200 sq ft) reception area and a grand piano that was used for improvised concerts. In 2012, Philippine Senator Franklin Drilon, recounting a previous visit to Berlin, had criticized the chancery's location, claiming that it was an "embarrassment" for it to be above a supermarket where frankfurters could be seen hanging outside near the chancery windows; Zaide, who was ambassador at the time Drilon visited, denied his version of events, claiming that he didn't recall that specific visit. The Uhlandstraße location was abandoned in favor of a new office along the Kurfürstendamm on November 23, 2015.

Planning for a new, permanent chancery began in the 2000s, with the government first looking at purchasing the property on Jägerstraße 71 in Friedrichstadt, across from the first headquarters of Deutsche Bank. At the time, the Philippines was the only Southeast Asian country whose embassy in Germany did not own its chancery nor its ambassadorial residence outright, and housing the embassy in that building would have been fitting as it was where José Rizal completed his first novel, Noli Me Tángere. With all Philippine government offices in Germany being hosted in the building, plus the ambassadorial residence being located on the top floor, the building was proposed to become the Philippine Center for Europe.

Unable to proceed with the Jägerstraße location as the property was not available for purchase, the embassy, led by Ambassador Ma. Cleofe Natividad, then began searching for a new property, with the process formally kicking off on May 11, 2012 alongside procurement for the construction of a new chancery for the Philippine Embassy in Islamabad. Negotiations opened in late 2013 for the construction of a chancery on Von-der-Heydt-Straße in Berlin's diplomatic quarter, south of the Tiergarten, with Düsseldorf-based HPP Architekten serving as consultant to the project. Construction of the building, a five-story structure combining both the chancery and the ambassadorial residence on the top floor, was awarded to Groth Gruppe, which was also responsible for building several other buildings in the area where the embassy was set to be constructed, and an agreement was signed on September 20, 2014 to facilitate construction, witnessed by President Benigno Aquino III.

Despite those agreements being signed, the project was likewise not able to proceed due to several factors, including a lack of funds, the hot Berlin real estate market and the slow pace of bureaucracy, which ultimately led to the construction of the present-day chancery.

=== Luisenstraße site ===
Construction of the present-day chancery on Luisenstraße was largely facilitated by Ambassador Melita Santa Maria-Thomeczek, who succeeded Natividad. Soon after assuming the ambassadorship in 2015, Thomeczek began searching for a suitable site for the chancery, settling on a 400 m^{2} (4,300 sq ft) site on Charitéstraße 7 – one of the last available vacant lots in the area. In the 19th century, the site was once home to Robert Leyser, a Jewish tailor and an ancestor of noted trade unionist Ludwig Rosenberg. The lot was secured at the end of 2015, and on April 19, 2016, the embassy signed an agreement with Zielconcept Real Estate to build a turnkey chancery with 1,400 m^{2} (15,000 sq ft) of usable space, with Aspera Technics, a Zielconcept subsidiary, overseeing construction.

Costing the Philippine government €11 million for both land acquisition and building construction, preparatory work began in November 2016, and construction officially commenced in early 2017. The building was topped off on January 17, 2018, near the end of Thomeczek's term, and it was inaugurated on February 19, 2019 with Foreign Affairs Secretary Teodoro Locsin Jr., Senator Loren Legarda and DFA officials, including former ambassadors Natividad and Thomeczek, in attendance. At its inauguration, Locsin remarked that he hopes all future Philippine embassies will look like the Berlin mission, and the official statement released by the embassy noted that the new chancery is a testament to the "continued relevance of good old brick-and-mortar diplomacy".

The seven-floor chancery, designed by Berlin architect Florian Hoyer, was built in the modernist style. Construction of the building was complicated by the street corner's slope, and also had to factor in urban design and historical preservation considerations due to its proximity to the Charité and the aesthetics of the surrounding neighborhood. Its interiors, deliberately built with few right angles save for the elevator shafts, and noted for its use of Filipiniana design elements, were designed by local design company Welcome Berlin, while the furniture used throughout the building was supplied by Spanish furniture maker Angel Cerdá, employing Italian designs with neutral color tones. Built with a gross floor area of 2,020 m^{2} (21,700 sq ft), a conference room occupies the building's top floor, while the ambassador's office is on the floor below. One floor houses the Berlin center of the Sentro Rizal, while the ground floor opens up to a small back garden with a staircase connecting it to the basement, which houses a large reception and function hall. Persons entering the chancery are greeted by a Buddy Bear named "Malakas", painted in the colors of the Philippine flag.

Although the lot which the chancery occupies is on Charitéstraße, it was originally planned to give the chancery an address using the nearby Karlplatz (Karlplatz 1), as it would've been more instantly recognizable. However, city authorities gave final approval to construction of the building with a Luisenstraße address (Luisenstraße 16).

== Staff and activities ==
The Philippine Embassy in Berlin is currently headed by Ambassador Maria Teresa T. Almojuela, who was appointed to the position by President Bongbong Marcos on June 2, 2025. Prior to her appointment as ambassador, Almojuela, a career diplomat, served as the DFA's Assistant Secretary for the United Nations and International Organizations, and before that served as deputy permanent representative of the Permanent Mission of the Philippines to the United Nations in Geneva. Her appointment was confirmed by the Commission on Appointments on June 4, 2025, and she presented her credentials to German President Frank-Walter Steinmeier on March 6, 2026.

Notable diplomats who have been deployed to the embassy include Foreign Affairs Secretary Delia Albert, who first served as the mission's second-in-command in the 1980s while it was still headquartered in Bonn, and Domingo Lucenario Jr., who worked at the embassy as a consul in the early 1990s. Planning for a permanent chancery in Berlin also began during Albert's ambassadorship from 2005 to 2010.

Many of the embassy's activities center around fostering and deepening economic and cultural relations between the Philippines and Germany. These include encouraging German businesses to invest in the Philippines, supporting Philippine produce exports to Germany, fostering cultural exchanges and encouraging the study of Filipino language and culture in German universities, launching a "living library" for exchanging stories and perspectives between Germans and Filipinos, and hosting seminars and lectures on Filipino culture, including a seminar on halo-halo and Filipino cuisine more generally, and a virtual baybayin class. In addition to these initiatives, the embassy is also responsible for ensuring the welfare of the large community of Filipinos in Germany, which it facilitates through the consulate in Frankfurt and honorary consulates in Munich, Stuttgart and Essen, as well as through conducting consular outreach activities in various parts of the country.

In 2008, the embassy's website was recognized as one of the best German-language websites by search engine erfolgreich-suchen.de, an honor which it also received the previous year.

== See also ==
- Germany–Philippines relations
- List of diplomatic missions of the Philippines
- Filipinos in Germany
