= Corruption in Chad =

Corruption in Chad is characterized by nepotism and cronyism. Chad received a score of 24 in the 2025 Transparency International Corruption Perceptions Index on a scale from 0 ("highly corrupt") to 100 ("very clean"). When ranked by score, Chad ranked 150th among the 182 countries in the Index, where the country ranked first is perceived to have the most honest public sector. For comparison with regional scores, the best score among sub-Saharan African countries (Note: Angola, Benin, Botswana, Burkina Faso, Burundi, Cameroon, Cape Verde, Central African Republic, Chad, Comoros, Côte d'Ivoire, Democratic Republic of the Congo, Djibouti, Equatorial Guinea, Eritrea, Eswatini, Ethiopia, Gabon, Gambia, Ghana, Guinea, Guinea-Bissau, Kenya, Lesotho, Liberia, Madagascar, Malawi, Mali, Mauritania, Mauritius, Mozambique, Namibia, Niger, Nigeria, Republic of the Congo, Rwanda, Sao Tome and Principe, Senegal, Seychelles, Sierra Leone, Somalia, South Africa, South Sudan, Sudan, Tanzania, Togo, Uganda, Zambia, and Zimbabwe.) was 68, the average was 32 and the worst was 9. For comparison with worldwide scores, the best score was 89 (ranked 1), the average was 42, and the worst was 9 (ranked 181, in a two-way tie).

== History of corruption in Chad ==
=== During the Tombalbaye government ===
François Tombalbaye was the first President of Chad. His regime has been described as marked by authoritarianism, extreme corruption, and favoritism. Corruption in the form of tax collection abuse was one of the main causes of the Mubi Uprising, a series of riots that started the Chadian Civil War.

=== During the Déby era ===
Idriss Déby, President from 1990 until he died in 2021, was accused of cronyism and tribalism. Chadian opposition leaders and Human Rights Watch accused Déby of electoral fraud in multiple elections where he and his party won by landslides. In 2005, Chad was ranked the most corrupt country in the world (tied with Bangladesh).

== Corruption in government institutions ==
=== In the judicial system ===
According to the Human Rights Report by the US Department of State, Chad's judicial system is heavily influenced by the government, causing government officials to enjoy impunity. Judges who try to uphold judicial independence face harassment and, in some cases, dismissal. Businesses have reported that they often pay bribes to influence judicial decisions. Ordinary civilians have low trust in their country's judicial system and they try avoid it.

=== In the security forces ===
According to the Human Rights Report by the US Department of State, corruption is largely present in both the military and the police of Chad. The security forces often engage in petty corruption, violence, and extortion, which usually goes unpunished. Multiple cases of the Judiciary Police not enforcing court orders against military personnel and members of their own ethnic group have been reported. There are also reports of policemen committing street crimes and unlawfully arresting people, usually foreign tourists.

In 2013, an anti-corruption crackdown was conducted in the police force. The crackdown uncovered illegal promotion and recruitment practices, lack of adequate training, favoritism and other corrupt activities. Two ministers were dismissed after the crackdown.

=== In the public services ===
Corruption in the Chad's public services of Chad is characterized by nepotism and bribery. Bribery is common in the public services due to the low salaries of civil servants. Public works conducted by the government have been criticized by international organizations for lacking transparency and involving high levels of corruption.

=== In the oil sector ===
Chad became an oil producer in 2003. In order to avoid resource curse and corruption, elaborate plans sponsored by the World Bank were made. This plan ensured transparency in payments, as well as that 80% of money from oil exports would be spent on five priority development sectors, the two most important of which are: education and healthcare. However, money started getting diverted towards the military even before the civil war broke out. In 2006, when the civil war escalated, Chad abandoned previous economic plans sponsored by the World Bank and added "national security" as a priority development sector. Money from this sector was used to improve the military. During the civil war, more than 600 million dollars were used to buy fighter jets, attack helicopters, and armored personnel carriers. In 2005, an investigation uncovered money waste, such as computers and printers being bought at inflated prices and various construction projects being paid for but never getting completed. According to the Extractive Industries Transparency Initiative, the lack of transparency in infrastructure projects funded by money from the oil sector and the fact that there is no record-keeping system to monitor the flow of money from the oil sector represent a significant risk of corruption.

== Anti-corruption efforts ==
Chad has a ministry for combating corruption, called the Ministry of Morality and Good Governance. In 2009, the ministry made a strategic plan to combat corruption, in the same year as an investigation against 10 government officials, including the then-mayor of N'Djamena and several cabinet ministers. The charges against them were dropped in 2010 because of the lack of evidence.

In 2012, the Chadian government launched Operation Cobra, which aimed to increase transparency and dismiss corrupt officials. It resulted in 400 officials being dismissed and according to the Ministry of Morality and Good Governance, XAF 25 billion (about €38 million) was to be recovered.

The Bertelsmann Transformation Index and the US Department of State have described the government's anti-corruption efforts as politically motivated and used as a way to eliminate political opposition.

=== Protests ===
Starting in 2014, protests against the corruption and authoritarianism of President Déby were held in N'Djamena. As of 2020, the protests had no success.
