= Gordon Kricke =

German diplomat

Jan-Christian Gordon Kricke (born 18 December 1962) is a German diplomat. He was head of the Sahel team at the Federal Foreign Office from 2019 to 2021 and German Ambassador to the Republic of Chad from 2021 until his expulsion in 2023.

== Biography ==
Kricke was born in Kiel. He entered the Foreign Service and, after passing the career examination in 1994, initially worked at the Foreign Office, followed by a posting to the Embassy in Buenos Aires, Argentina, from 1995 to 1998, and then as Deputy Head of Mission in Mozambique until 2000. After a subsequent assignment at the Foreign Office, he served as ambassador to Haiti from 2003 to 2005, during which time the embassy in Port-au-Prince was a so-called "small mission" consisting only of him and a few local staff. He was succeeded in this position by Hubertus Thoma.

In December 2016, he succeeded Thomas Ossowski as Ambassador to the Philippines and held this position until August 2019. During his time in Manila, he regularly contributed to general topics on the website philstar.com.

From 2019, he was head of the Sahel Task Force at the Foreign Office and also served as special envoy for the Sahel.

On 1 July 2021, Kricke was appointed Ambassador to Chad, succeeding Jakob Haselhuber. On 8 April 2023, he was asked by the government in N'Djamena to leave the country within 48 hours. The reason for his expulsion was "discourteous attitude", after having criticised the government for election delays.
